= List of cabinets of Turkey =

The following is a list of cabinets of Turkey since 1920. Numbered I to V are leaders predating the declaration of the Republic of Turkey on October 29, 1923.

The list includes the one-party period of the Republic of Turkey (1925–1945) and the subsequent multi-party period of the Republic of Turkey (1945–present).

== List ==
No.	Head of Government	Period in office	In office as a result of	Party
Pre-republic period
I	Mustafa Kemal Atatürk	May 3, 1920 – January 24, 1921	1920 Turkish Grand National Assembly election	Association for Defence of National Rights
II	Fevzi Çakmak	January 24, 1921 – May 19, 1921		Association for Defence of National Rights
III	Fevzi Çakmak	May 19, 1921 – July 9, 1922		Association for Defence of National Rights
IV	Rauf Orbay	July 12, 1922 – August 4, 1923		Association for Defence of National Rights
V	Ali Fethi Okyar	August 14, 1923 – October 27, 1923	1923 general election	Association for Defence of National Rights
One-party period
1	İsmet İnönü	November 1, 1923 – March 6, 1924	Republican system proclaimed	Republican People's Party
2	İsmet İnönü	March 6, 1924 – November 22, 1924	Government restructure after two ministries abolished	Republican People's Party
3	Ali Fethi Okyar	November 22, 1924 – March 3, 1925	Requested by President	Republican People's Party
4	İsmet İnönü	March 3, 1925 – November 1, 1927	Okyar resigned after Sheikh Said rebellion	Republican People's Party
5	İsmet İnönü	November 1, 1927 – September 27, 1930	1927 general election	Republican People's Party
6	İsmet İnönü	September 27, 1930 – May 4, 1931	İnönü renewed cabinet after Liberal Republican Party founded	Republican People's Party
7	İsmet İnönü	May 4, 1931 – March 1, 1935	1931 general election	Republican People's Party
8	İsmet İnönü	March 1, 1935 – October 25, 1937	1935 general election	Republican People's Party
9	Celâl Bayar	October 25, 1937 – November 11, 1938	Resignation of İnönü due to conflicts with President Atatürk.	Republican People's Party
10	Celâl Bayar	November 11, 1938 – January 25, 1939	Previous government was dismissed after President’s death.	Republican People's Party
11	Refik Saydam	January 25, 1939 – April 3, 1939	Resignation of Bayar due to conflicts with President İnönü	Republican People's Party
12	Refik Saydam	April 3, 1939 – July 9, 1942	1939 general election	Republican People's Party
13	Şükrü Saraçoğlu	July 9, 1942 – March 9, 1943	Death of Saydam	Republican People's Party
14	Şükrü Saraçoğlu	March 9, 1943 – August 7, 1946	1943 general election	Republican People's Party
Parliamentary system
15	Recep Peker	August 7, 1946 – September 10, 1947	1946 general election	Republican People's Party
16	Hasan Saka	September 10, 1947 – June 10, 1948	Peker resigned after disagreement with İsmet İnönü.	Republican People's Party
17	Hasan Saka	June 10, 1948 – January 16, 1949	Saka resigned after being criticized against opposition Democrat Party.	Republican People's Party
18	Şemsettin Günaltay	January 16, 1949 – May 22, 1950	Saka resigned after CHP believed to be losing voters.	Republican People's Party
19	Adnan Menderes	May 22, 1950 – March 9, 1951	1950 general election	Democrat Party
20	Adnan Menderes	March 9, 1951 – May 17, 1954	Menderes resigned to be able to renew his cabinet.	Democrat Party
21	Adnan Menderes	May 17, 1954 – December 9, 1955	1954 general election	Democrat Party
22	Adnan Menderes	December 9, 1955 – November 25, 1957	Menderes resigned after a political crisis about press freedom.	Democrat Party
23	Adnan Menderes	November 25, 1957 – May 27, 1960	1957 general election	Democrat Party
24	Cemal Gürsel	May 30, 1960 – January 5, 1961	1960 Turkish coup d'état	None
25	Cemal Gürsel	January 5, 1961 – November 20, 1961	Gürsel resigned to form a new cabinet that would cooperate with the constituent assembly.	None
26	İsmet İnönü	November 20, 1961 – June 25, 1962	1961 general election	CHP-Justice Party
27	İsmet İnönü	June 25, 1962 – December 25, 1963	İnönü resigned after disagreement on an amnesty act for the former DP members.	CHP-YTP-CKMP
28	İsmet İnönü	December 25, 1963 – February 20, 1965	Coalition ended after YTP and CKMP lost votes in 1963 local elections.	CHP-Independents
29	Suad Hayri Ürgüplü	February 20, 1965 – October 27, 1965	Caretaker government until elections	Indep.-AP-YTP-CKMP-MP
30	Süleyman Demirel	October 27, 1965 – November 3, 1969	1965 general election	Justice Party
31	Süleyman Demirel	November 3, 1969 – March 6, 1970	1969 general election	Justice Party
32	Süleyman Demirel	March 6, 1970 – March 26, 1971	Demirel lost vote of no confidence in TBMM.	Justice Party
33	Nihat Erim	March 26, 1971 – December 11, 1971	1971 Turkish coup d'état	Indep.-AP-CHP-MGP
34	Nihat Erim	December 11, 1971 – May 22, 1972	Military re-appointment after government collapsed	Indep.-AP-CHP-MGP
35	Ferit Melen	May 22, 1972 – April 15, 1973	Resignation of Nihat Erim	MGP-AP-CHP
36	Mehmet Naim Talu	April 15, 1973 – January 26, 1974	Fahri Korutürk elected as President	Indep.-AP-CGP
37	Bülent Ecevit	January 26, 1974 – November 17, 1974	1973 general election	CHP-MSP
38	Sadi Irmak	November 17, 1974 – March 31, 1975	CHP and MSP drifted away	Indep.-CGP
39	Süleyman Demirel	March 31, 1975 – June 21, 1977	Previous government formed without a vote of confidence	AP-MSP-CGP-MHP
40	Bülent Ecevit	June 21, 1977 – July 21, 1977	1977 general election	CHP minority government
41	Süleyman Demirel	July 21, 1977 – January 5, 1978	Previous cabinet lost a vote of confidence	AP-MSP-MHP
42	Bülent Ecevit	January 5, 1978 – November 12, 1979	Government overthrown by interpellation	CHP-Indep.
43	Süleyman Demirel	November 12, 1979 – September 12, 1980	Ecevit resigned after his party lost 1979 Senate elections	AP
44	Bülent Ulusu	September 21, 1980 – December 13, 1983	1980 Turkish coup d'état, September	None
45	Turgut Özal	December 13, 1983 – December 21, 1987	1983 general election	Motherland Party
46	Turgut Özal	December 21, 1987 – November 9, 1989	1987 general election	Motherland Party
47	Yıldırım Akbulut	November 9, 1989 – June 23, 1991	1989 presidential election, won by Turgut Özal	Motherland Party
48	Mesut Yılmaz	June 23, 1991 – November 20, 1991	Gaining ANAP leadership at 1991 party congress	Motherland Party
49	Süleyman Demirel	November 20, 1991 – June 25, 1993	1991 general election	DYP-SHP
50	Tansu Çiller	June 25, 1993 – October 5, 1995	1993 presidential election, won by Süleyman Demirel	DYP-CHP/SHP
51	Tansu Çiller	October 5, 1995 – October 30, 1995	CHP withdrawal from coalition	DYP minority government
52	Tansu Çiller	October 30, 1995 – March 6, 1996	Caretaker government (Note: Caretaking during prolonged coalition negotiations after 1995 general election, December)	DYP-CHP
53	Mesut Yılmaz	March 6, 1996 – June 28, 1996	1995 general election	ANAP-DYP
54	Necmettin Erbakan	June 28, 1996 – June 30, 1997	Presidential intervention (Note: Censure motion of Welfare Party (largest party), leading to President Süleyman Demirel asking Welfare Party to form a government)	Welfare Party-DYP
55	Mesut Yılmaz	June 30, 1997 – January 11, 1999	Presidential intervention (Note: The Welfare Party resigned from government following the February 1997 military memorandum. DYP and others expected to form a government under Tansu Çiller, but President Süleyman Demirel asked ANAP leader Mesut Yılmaz to form the new government.)	ANAP-DSP-DTP
56	Bülent Ecevit	January 11, 1999 – May 28, 1999	Caretaker government until scheduled elections	DSP minority government
57	Bülent Ecevit	May 28, 1999 – November 18, 2002	1999 general election	DSP, ANAP, MHP
58	Abdullah Gül	November 18, 2002 – March 11, 2003	2002 general election	Justice and Development Party
59	Recep Tayyip Erdoğan	March 14, 2003 – August 29, 2007	Abdullah Gül's resignation as Prime Minister	Justice and Development Party
60	Recep Tayyip Erdoğan	August 29, 2007 – July 14, 2011	2007 general election	Justice and Development Party
61	Recep Tayyip Erdoğan	July 14, 2011 – August 28, 2014	2011 general election	Justice and Development Party
62	Ahmet Davutoğlu	August 29, 2014 – August 29, 2015	2014 presidential election, won by Recep Tayyip Erdoğan	Justice and Development Party
63	Ahmet Davutoğlu	August 29, 2015 – November 24, 2015	June 2015 general election	AKP, MHP, (Note: Upon his decision to take part in interim government, MHP member Tuğrul Türkeş suspended from MHP 4 days after his ministry begun.) HDP, (Note: HDP ministers resigned from Cabinet 25 days later.) Indep. interim election government
64	Ahmet Davutoğlu	November 24, 2015 – May 24, 2016	November 2015 general election	Justice and Development Party
65	Binali Yıldırım	May 24, 2016 – July 9, 2018	Ahmet Davutoğlu's resignation as Prime Minister	Justice and Development Party
Presidential system
66	Recep Tayyip Erdoğan	July 9, 2018 – June 3, 2023	2018 presidential election	Justice and Development Party
67	Recep Tayyip Erdoğan	June 3, 2023 – present	2023 presidential election	Justice and Development Party

== Statistics ==
Including the one-party period, shortest government in Turkey's history was DYP minority government led by Tansu Çiller, which only lasted 25 days. Longest government in duty was fourth cabinet of Recep Tayyip Erdoğan, which lasted 1,789 days. Longest coalition was DSP, ANAP and MHP coalition led by Bülent Ecevit, which lasted 1270 days.

Including one-party period, only 4 out of 67 governments span into full-extend of their time (came with an election, ended with regular time): first Demirel government, first Özal government, second and fourth Erdoğan government.

== See also ==
- List of presidents of Turkey
- List of prime ministers of Turkey
- Coalition governments in Turkey
- List of the Main Opposition Leaders of Turkey
