= List of ministers of finance of Turkey =

Minister of Treasury and Finance
- Hazine ve Maliye Bakanı
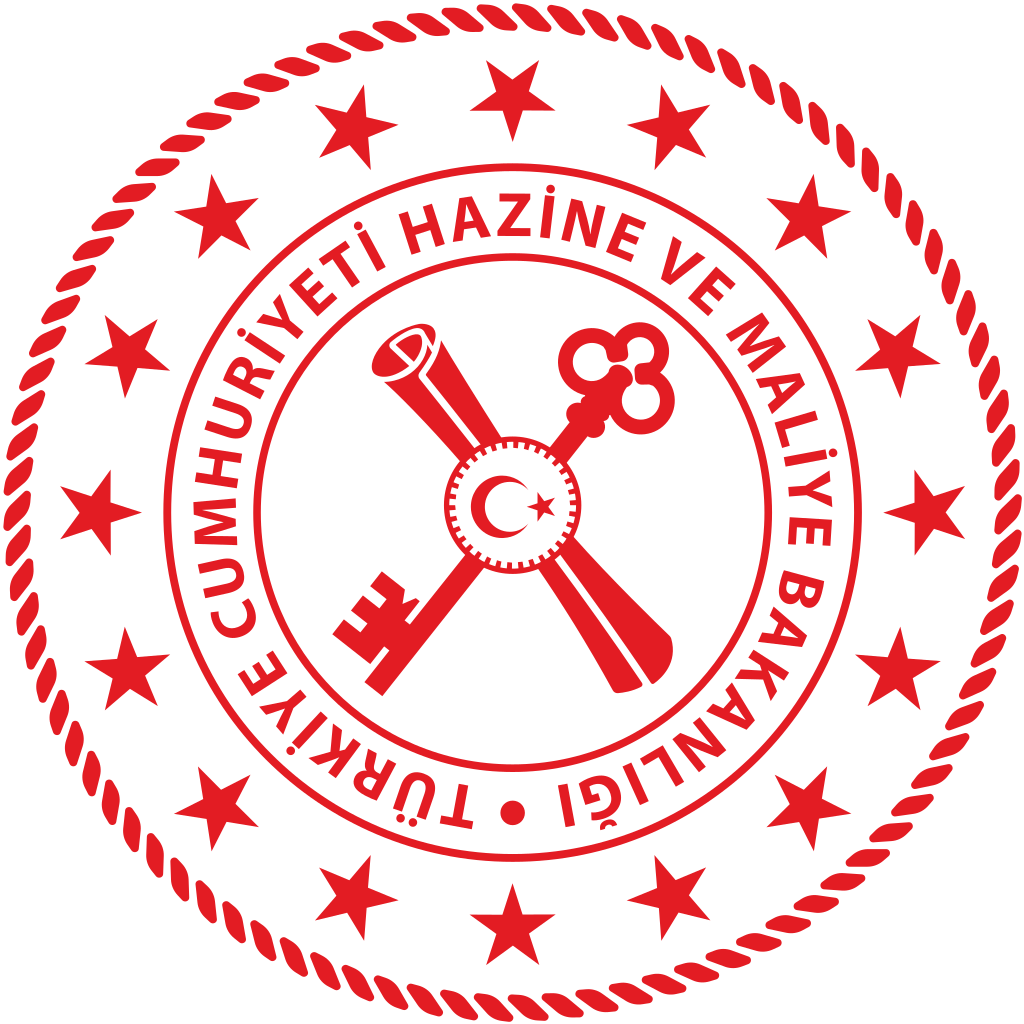
- Logo of the ministry

- Flag of Turkey

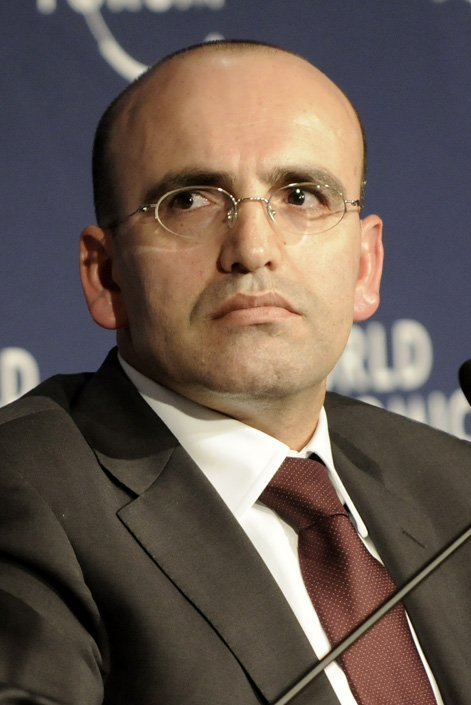
- Incumbent; Mehmet Şimşek since 3 June 2023
- Ministry of Treasury and Finance
- Abbreviation: HMB (in Turkish)
- Member of: Cabinet; Supreme Military Council; Economic Coordination Council
- Reports to: President
- Nominator: President
- Appointer: President
- Formation: 2 May 1920
- First holder: Hasan Fehmi Ataç
- Deputy: Deputy Minister
- Website: www.hmb.gov.tr

The minister of treasury and finance of Turkey (Turkish: Hazine ve Maliye Bakanı) is the head of the Ministry of Treasury and Finance and a member of the Cabinet of Turkey.

== Ministers of finance ==
=== Grand National Assembly (1920–1923) ===
#	Name	Took office	Left office	Chairman (Cabinet)
1	Hakkı Behiç Bayiç	3 May 1920	17 July 1920	Atatürk (I)
2	Ahmet Ferit Tek	17 July 1920	19 May 1921	Atatürk (I); Çakmak (II)
3	Hasan Saka	19 May 1921	22 April 1922	Çakmak (III)
4	Hasan Fehmi Ataç	22 April 1922	27 October 1923	Çakmak (III); Orbay (IV); Okyar (V)

=== Republic of Turkey (1923–present) ===
#	Portrait	Name	Took office	Left office
1		Hasan Fehmi Ataç	30 October 1923	2 January 1924
2		Abdülhalik Renda	2 January 1924	21 May 1924
3		Recep Peker	21 May 1924	22 November 1924
4		Abdülhalik Renda	22 November 1924	3 March 1925
5		Hasan Saka	3 March 1925	13 July 1926
6		Abdülhalik Renda	13 July 1926	1 November 1927
7		Şükrü Saracoğlu	1 November 1927	25 December 1930
8		Abdülhalik Renda	25 December 1930	3 February 1934
9		Fuat Ağralı	3 February 1934	13 September 1944
10		Nurullah Esat Sumer	13 September 1944	7 August 1946
11		Halit Nazmi Keşmir	7 August 1946	23 March 1948
12		Hasan Şevket Adalan	27 March 1948	16 January 1949
13		İsmail Rüştü Aksal	16 January 1949	22 May 1950
14		Halil Ayan	22 May 1950	14 December 1950
15		Hasan Polatkan	14 December 1950	9 December 1955
16		Nedim Ökmen	9 December 1955	24 August 1956
17		Hasan Polatkan	3 December 1956	27 May 1960
18		Ekrem Alican	30 May 1960	26 December 1960
19		Mustafa Kemal Kurdaş	26 December 1960	20 November 1961
20		Osman Şefik İnan	20 November 1961	25 June 1962
21		Ferit Melen	25 June 1962	20 February 1965
22		Ihsan Gürsan	20 February 1965	2 November 1966
23		Nevzat Cihat Bilgehan	14 November 1966	3 November 1969
24		Ali Mesut Erez	3 November 1969	26 March 1971
25		Sait Naci Ergin	26 March 1971	22 May 1972
26		Ziya Müezzinoğlu	22 May 1972	15 April 1973
27		Sadık Tekin Müftüoğlu	15 April 1973	26 January 1974
28		Deniz Baykal	26 January 1974	17 November 1974
29		Bedri Gursoy	17 November 1974	31 March 1975
30		Yilmaz Ergenekon	31 March 1975	21 June 1977
31		Besim Üstünel	21 June 1977	21 July 1977
32		Nevzat Cihat Bilgehan	21 July 1977	5 January 1978
33		Ziya Müezzinoğlu	5 January 1978	12 November 1979
34		İsmet Sezgin	12 November 1979	12 September 1980
35		Kaya Erdem	20 September 1980	14 July 1982
36		Adnan Başer Kafaoğlu	14 July 1982	13 December 1983
37		Vural Arıkan	13 December 1983	26 October 1984
38		Ahmet Kurtcebe Alptemoçin	26 October 1984	30 March 1989
39		Ekrem Pakdemirli	30 March 1989	29 March 1990
40		Adnan Kahveci	29 March 1990	20 November 1991
41		Sümer Oral	20 November 1991	25 June 1993
42		İsmet Atilla	25 June 1993	6 March 1996
43		Lütfullah Kayalar	6 March 1996	28 June 1996
44		Abdüllatif Şener	28 June 1996	30 June 1997
45		Zekeriya Temizel	30 June 1997	28 May 1999
46		Sümer Oral	28 May 1999	19 November 2002
47		Kemal Unakıtan	19 November 2002	1 May 2009
48		Mehmet Şimşek	1 May 2009	24 November 2015
49		Naci Ağbal	24 November 2015	10 July 2018
50		Berat Albayrak	10 July 2018	9 November 2020
51		Lütfi Elvan	9 November 2020	2 December 2021
52		Nureddin Nebati	2 December 2021	3 June 2023
(48)		Mehmet Şimşek	3 June 2023	Incumbent

== See also ==
- Cabinet of Turkey

== Sources ==
- Finance Ministers of Turkey
