= 2nd Parliament of Turkey =

Grand National Assembly from 1923 to 1927

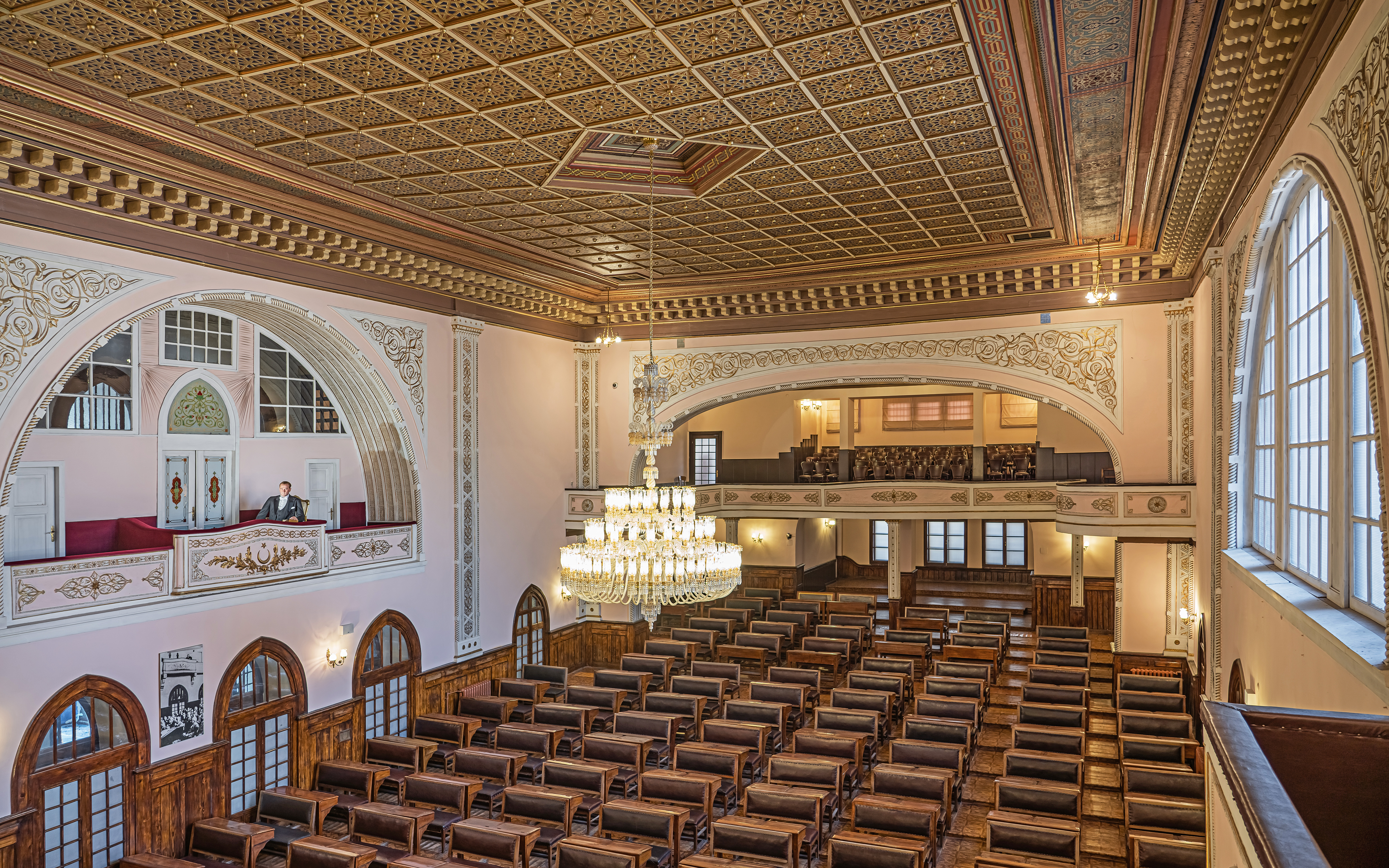
Plenary chamber of the 2nd Parliament, today the Republic Museum

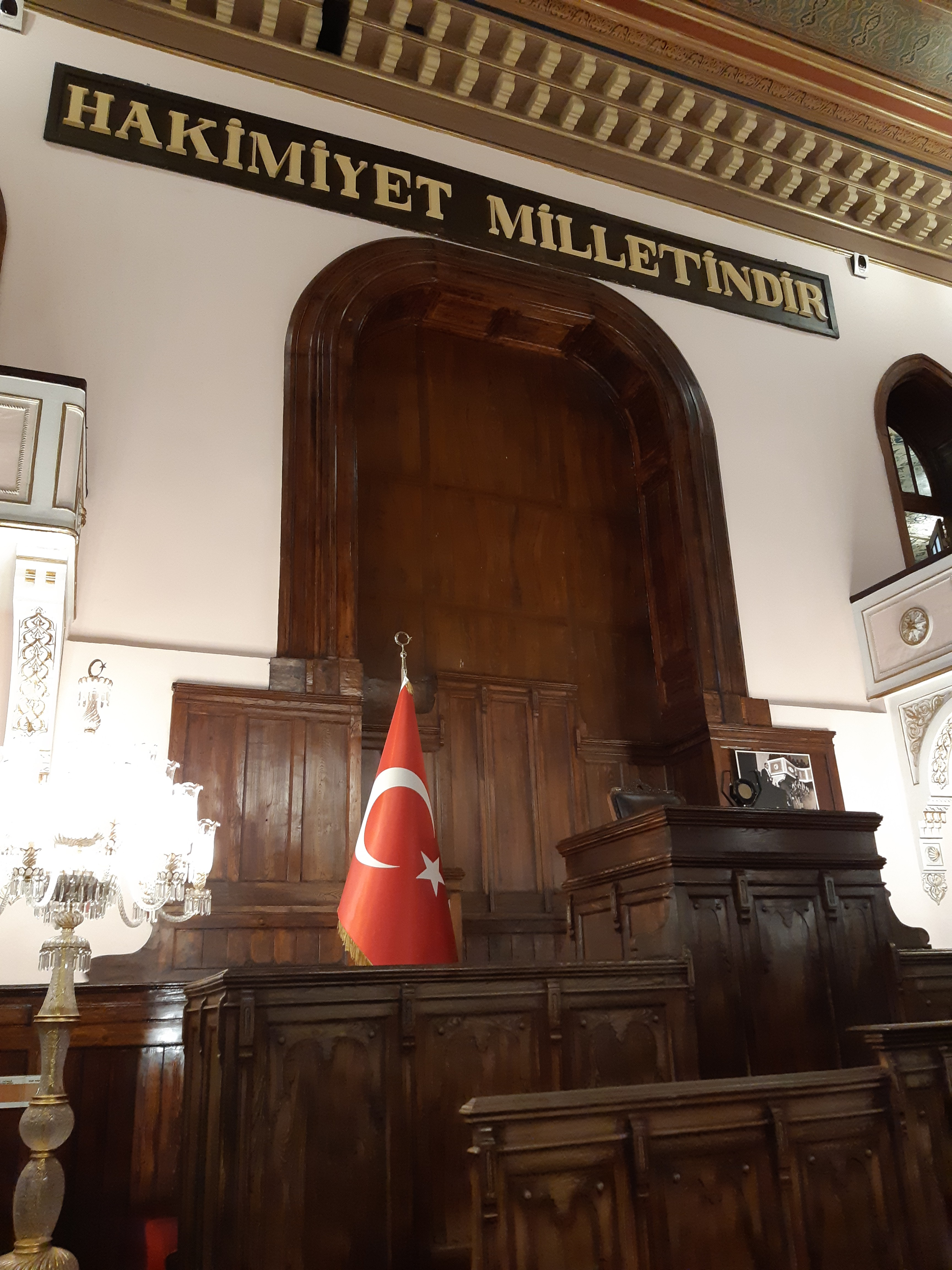
Parliament rostrum with the text Sovereignty unconditionally belongs to the Nation

The 2nd Grand National Assembly of Turkey existed from 29 October 1923 to 1 September 1927. Actually the parliament members were elected on 11 August 1923, before the Republic was proclaimed on 29 October.

There were 333 MPs in the parliament all of which were the members of the People's Party (later renamed Republican People's Party) (CHP). But later 30 of them issued from CHP to serve in Progressive Republican Party (TCP).

== Main parliamentary milestones ==
Some of the important events in the history of the parliament are the following:

- 29 October 1923 - Republic was proclaimed and Mustafa Kemal (Atatürk) was elected as the first president of Turkey.
- 30 October 1923- İsmet İnönü of CHP formed the 1st government of Turkey .
- 1 November 1923 - Fethi Okyar of CHP was elected as the parliament speaker
- 26 December 1923- Law 391: Amnesty law
- 3 March 1924- Three important laws; Law 429: Ministry of Sharia and the Foundations and the Ministry of General Staff (which was created during Turkish War of Independence); Law 430: Unification of education (i.e., abolition of religious primary schools); Law 431: Abolition of caliphate (with this law members of the Ottoman family were expelled from Turkey),
- 5 March 1924 –İsmet İnönü formed the 2nd government of Turkey
- 20 April 1924 - Law 491 :New constitution
- 26 October 1924 - The military commanders who were the members of the parliament were asked to choose between the military service or politics.
- 9 November 1924- Progressive Republican Party (TCP) was founded as the main opposition to CHP by Kazım Karabekir and Rauf Orbay.
- 21 November 1924 – Fethi Okyar formed the 3rd government of Turkey
- 17 February 1925 - Law 552: Abolition of Aşar, a heavy tax on the farmers
- 26 November 1924- Kazım Özalp was elected as the speaker of the parliament.
- 2 March 1925- İsmet İnönü formed the 4th government of Turkey
- 3 June 1925 - Abolition of the TCP
- 17 February 1926- Law 743: Civil code
- 1 March - Law 765: Criminal Code
- 20 July 1927 - General Elections (first stage)
- 1 September 1927 -Elections (second stage)

Preceded by 1st Parliament of Turkey	2nd Parliament of Turkey; Fethi Okyar-Kazım Özalp; 29 October 1923 – 1 September 1927	Succeeded by 3rd Parliament of Turkey
