= 3rd cabinet of the Executive Ministers of Turkey =

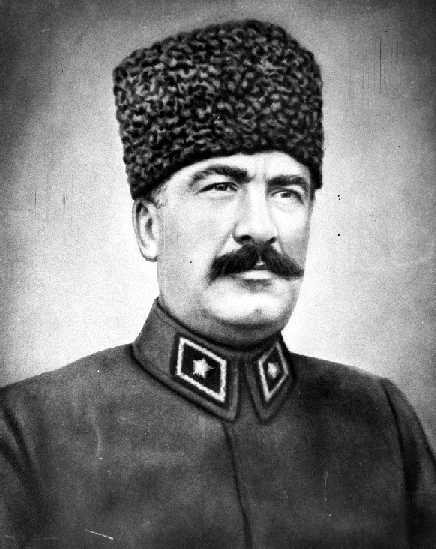
Fevzi Çakmak

The 3rd cabinet of executive ministers of Turkey (19 May 1921 – 9 July 1922 ) was the third government formed by the nationalists during the Turkish War of Independence. The Republic was not yet proclaimed and the government was called İcra vekilleri heyeti ("cabinet of executive ministers")

== Background ==
The chairman of the cabinet (equivalent to prime minister) was Fevzi Pasha (later named Çakmak) who also acted as the Minister of Defense and later as the Minister of The Chief of staff after 3 August 1921. Both Fevzi Pasha and the other members of the cabinet were elected by the parliament one by one. Since Fevzi Pasha was also the chairman of the previous cabinet, this cabinet was a revision of the former cabinet.

== The government ==
In the list below, the name in parathesis is the surname the cabinet members assumed later.(see Surname Law of 1934)

Title	Name	Dates
Chairman	Fevzi (Çakmak)	
Ministry of Sharia and the Foundations	Mustafa Fehmi (Gerçeker); Abdullah Azmi (Torun)	19 May 1921 – 27 April 1922; 27 April 1922 – 9 July 1922
Minister of Justice	Refik Şevket (İnce)	
Minister of General Staff	İsmet (İnönü); Fevzi (Çakmak)	19 May 1921 – 3 August 1921; 3 August 1921 – 9 July 1922
Minister of Defense	Fevzi (Çakmak); Refet (Bele); Kazım (Özalp)	19 May 1921 - 5 August 1921; 5 August 1921 -14 January 1922; 14 January 1922 -9 July 1922
Minister of Interior	Ata (Atalay); Refet (Bele); Ali Fethi (Okyar)	19 May 1921 January 1921 -30 June 1921; 30 June 1921 - 10 October 1921; 10 October 1921- 9 July 1922
Minister of Foreign Affairs	Yusuf Kemal Bey ( Tengirşenk)	
Minister of Economy	Celal (Bayar); Sırrı (Day); Hasan (Saka)	19 May 1921 - 1 January 1922; 14 January 1922 - 11 May 1922; 11 May 1922 - 9 July 1922
Minister of Finance	Hasan (Saka); Hasan Fehmi (Ataç)	19 May 1921 - 22 April 1922; 22 April 1922- 9 July 1922
Minister of Education	Hamdullah Suphi (Tanrıöver); Mehmet Vehbi (Bolak)	19 May 1921 – 20 November 1921; 20 November 1921 – 9 July 1922
Minister of Public Works	Ömer Lütfi (Argeşo); Rauf (Orbay); Fevzi (Pirinççioğlu)	19 May 1921- 21 November 1921; 21 November 1921- 14 January 1922; 14 January 1922 – 9 July 1922
Minister of Health and Social Solidarity	Refik (Saydam); Rıza Nur	19 May 1921- 24 December 1921; 24 January 1921 – 9 July 1922

Preceded by 2nd cabinet of the Executive Ministers of Turkey (Fevzi Pasha)	3rd cabinet of the Executive Ministers of Turkey (Fevzi Pasha); 19 May 1921 - 9 July 1922	Succeeded by 4th cabinet of the Executive Ministers of Turkey (Rauf Bey)
