= Hamdullah Suphi Tanrıöver =

Turkish politician and diplomat

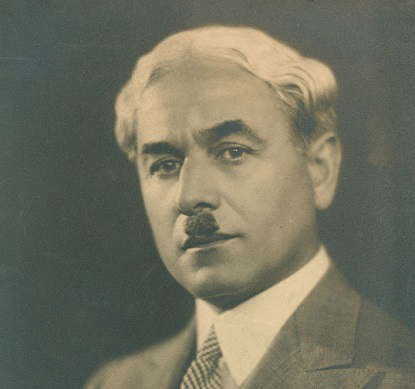

Minister of National Education
- In office 3 March 1925 – 21 December 1925
- Prime Minister: İsmet İnönü
- Preceded by: Şükrü Saraçoğlu
- Succeeded by: Mustafa Necati Uğural

Minister of Education
- In office 13 December 1920 – 20 November 1921
- Prime Minister: Mustafa Kemal Atatürk, Fevzi Çakmak
- Preceded by: Rıza Nur
- Succeeded by: Mehmet Vehbi Bolak

Personal details
- Born: Hamdullah Suphi; 1885 Constantinople, Ottoman Empire
- Died: 10 June 1966 (aged 80–81) Istanbul, Turkey
- Resting place: Merkezefendi Cemetery, Istanbul
- Party: Republican People's Party (CHP), Democrat Party (DP), Liberty Party (HP)
- Education: Galatasaray High School
- Occupation: Poet, politician, diplomat
- Cabinet: 1st cabinet of the Executive Ministers, 2nd cabinet of the Executive Ministers, 3rd cabinet of the Executive Ministers, 4th government

Hamdullah Suphi Tanrıöver (1885 – 10 June 1966) was a highly influential Turkish poet, intellectual, diplomat and politician. He adopted his surname Tanrıöver after the Turkish Surname Law was enacted in 1934.

== Life ==
He was born to Abdüllatif Suphi Pasha, an Ottoman statesman in Constantinople in 1885. He studied at Galatasaray High School graduating in 1904. He later served as a translator, and a teacher for Turkish after earning a certificate.

In Darülfünün, later renamed to Istanbul University, he was appointed professor of Islamic art. During the Turkish Republic era, he was elected to the parliament, and also served as a government minister.

He married Ayşe Saide, who, according to some sources, was a descendant of two former Anatolian beys (Isfendiyarids and Ramazanids).

Tanrıöver died on 10 June 1966. He was interred at Merkezefendi Cemetery in Istanbul.

== Poet and orator ==
During his childhood, his father's mansion was a meeting point of famous poets, and he was influenced by the poet community during his early years. He published his first poems in a literary newspaper published by his uncle in Paris, France. He began writing in Genç Kalemler (literally: "The Young Pens"), a literary periodical. He also distinguished himself as an orator.

== Politics ==
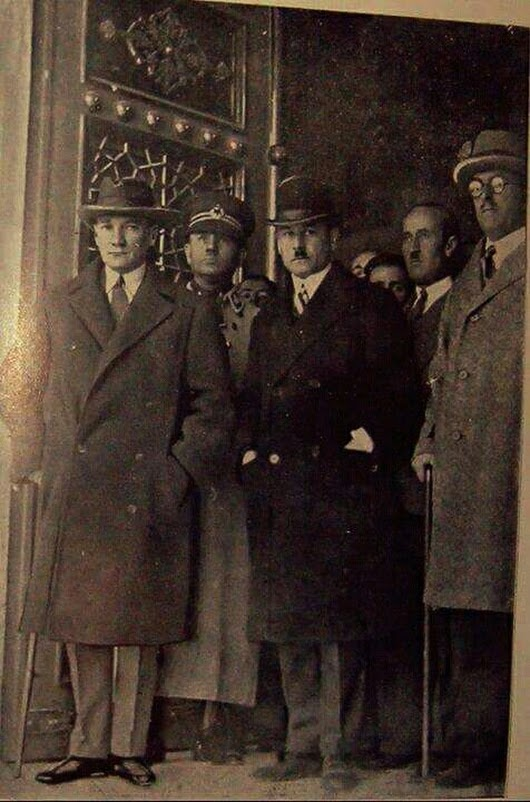
Atatürk and Hamdullah Suphi Tanrıöver, 1935

He took part in a committee, which was tasked to reflect the ordeal of the Turkish population in the Balkans after the Balkan Wars (1912–1913). During the Turkish War of Independence (1919–1923), he took side with Mustafa Kemal Pasha (Atatürk), and became a member of the 1st Parliament of Turkey. He was appointed Director of the Press and Information. Then, he served as the Minister of Education from 13 December 1920 to 20 November 1921 in the 1st, 2nd and the 3rd cabinet of the Executive Ministers of Turkey.

After the proclamation of the Republic, he served again as the Minister of National Education in 4th government of Turkey between 3 March 1925 and 21 December 1925. In 1931, he was appointed ambassador of Turkey to Romania in Bucharest. In 1943, he entered in the parliament from the Republican People's Party. In 1950, he joined the newly founded Democrat Party. Several years later, however, following the struggle for the "Right to Prove" in press, he co-founded the Liberty Party. He lost his seat when his political party was defeated in the 1957 general election.

== Books ==
His books are:

- 1909 Namık Kemal Bey Magosa'da (Documentary about "Namık Kemal in Famagusta")
- 1928 Günebakan (essays)
- 1931 Dağyolu (orations)
- 1946 Anadolu Milli Mücadelesi (Anatolian National struggle)

Political offices
Preceded by Rıza Nur	Minister of Education; 13 December 1920 – 20 November 1921	Succeeded by Mehmet Vehbi Bolak
Preceded by Şükrü Saracoğlu	Minister of National Education; 3 March 1925 – 21 December 1925	Succeeded by Mustafa Necati Uğural
