= 1st Parliament of Turkey =

Grand National Assembly from 1920 to 1923

The first parliament of Turkey existed from 23 April 1920 to 11 August 1923. This parliament existed before the Republic of Turkey was proclaimed.

== Background ==
The parliament of the Ottoman Empire was in Constantinople (now Istanbul). But after the First World War, İstanbul was occupied by the Allies of World War I (United Kingdom, France and Italy). The Ottoman sultan was still living in his palace; but on 16 March 1920, the parliament was abolished by the Allies. Some MPs were arrested and later expelled to Malta.

== Ankara parliament ==
The nationalists in Anatolia called for another parliament in Angora (now Ankara), which was not under Allied occupation. All former Ottoman MPs were invited to this parliament. Most MPs who were had not been arrested accepted the invitation and came to Angora. There were also new MPs which were elected in the 66 provinces. But due to time limitations and the fact that most of the country was under Allied control, they were elected by the Turkish National Movement members instead of the general vote. (see Sivas Congress) Ankara then was a small city without the amenities of a comfortable life. The MPs began living in Ankara citizen's houses or even in dormitories. Even the parliament building was an inconvenient building, built shortly before 1920 as a branch office building of the Committee of Union and Progress. Mustafa Kemal Pasha, the leader of the nationalists was serving in the train station building. (But he transferred to a house in Çankaya district, which later on became the mansion of the Turkish presidents)

== The parliamentary term ==
The parliament was opened on 23 April 1920. The total number of representatives were 422 . (Later in 1922, with the addition of the former Ottoman MPs released in Malta the number of representatives increased to 436.) 88 of these were former Ottoman MPs.

The parliament was an all-powerful parliament. The government members were elected by the parliament one by one and the government was named İcra vekilleri heyeti ("Committee of Executive ministers"). Thus parliament had both the legislative and the executive powers. Professor Tarık Zafer Tunaya compares this parliament with the National Convention parliament of France. Mustafa Kemal Pasha was the chairman of the Parliament.

On 21 January 1921 the parliament ratified the constitution which would be valid during the Turkish War of Independence.

During the Greek offensive in the war, parliament asked Mustafa Kemal to be the commander of the army. Mustafa Kemal was planning a large scale mobilization and accepted the offer on the condition that he would be authorized to exercise the power of the parliament for three months. On 5 August 1921, Mustafa Kemal Pasha became the commander of the army.

After the victory, this authorization caused an opposition in the parliament (see Second Group).

== End of the term ==
The first parliamentary term of Turkey was ended by the general elections held on 28 June 1923 which immediately followed the signing of the Treaty of Lausanne.

== List of the prime ministers served before the Republic ==
The governments (Prime ministers of executive council) following several-days temporary government were the following,

Government	Prime minister	Dates
1. government	Mustafa Kemal Pasha (Later Kemal Atatürk)	3 May 1920 – 24 January 1921
2. government	Fevzi Pasha (later Fevzi Çakmak)	24 January 1921 – 19 May 1921
3. government	Fevzi Pasha (later Fevzi Çakmak)	19 May 1921 - 9 July 1922
4. government	Rauf Bey (later Rauf Orbay)	12 July 1922 – 4 August 1923
5. government	Fethi Bey (later Fethi Okyar)	4 August 1923 – 27 October 1923

(After the proclamation of the Republic the governments were renumbered beginning from 1st government of Turkey)

First three governments of Turkey were during this term.

Preceded by (new establishment)	1st Parliament of Turkey; Mustafa Kemal; 23 April 1920 - 28 June 1923	Succeeded by 2nd Parliament of Turkey
