= 1st cabinet of the Executive Ministers of Turkey =

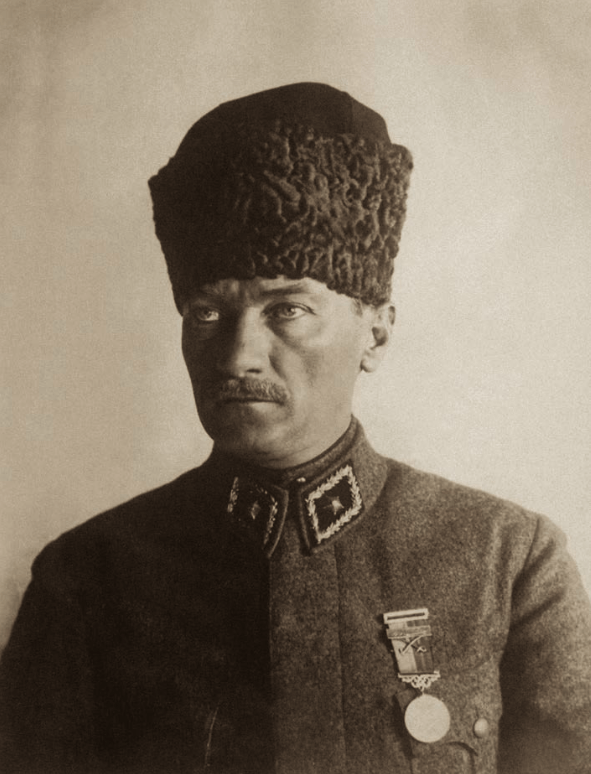
Mustafa Kemal Pasha

The 1st cabinet of executive ministers of Turkey (3 May 1920 – 24 January 1921) was the first government formed by the nationalists during the Turkish War of Independence. The Republic was not yet proclaimed and the government was called Meclis-i Vükelâ or Heyet-i Vükelâ in Ottoman Turkish and İcra Vekilleri Heyeti in Turkish, it means "cabinet of executive ministers".

== Background ==
The chairman of the cabinet (equivalent to prime minister) was Mustafa Kemal Pasha (later named Atatürk.) The other members of the cabinet were elected by the parliament one by one.

== The government ==
In the list below, the name in parentheses is the surname the cabinet members assumed later (see Surname Law of 1934).

Title	Name	Dates
Chairman	Mustafa Kemal (Atatürk)	
Ministry of Sharia and the Foundations	Mustafa Fehmi (Gerçeker)	
Minister of Justice	Celalettin Arif	
Minister of General Staff	İsmet (İnönü)	
Minister of Defence	Fevzi (Çakmak)	
Minister of Interior	Cami (Baykurt); Hakkı Behiç (Bayiç); Nazım (Resmor); Refet (Bele)	3 May 1920 - 13 July 1920; 17 July 1920 - 4 September 1920; 4 September 1920 - 6 September 1920; 16 September 1920 - 24 January 1921
Minister of Foreign Affairs	Bekir Sami (Kunduh)	
Minister of Economy	Yusuf Kemal (Tengirşek)	
Minister of Finance	Hakkı Behiç (Bayiç); Ahmet Ferit (Tek)	3 May 1920 - 17 July 1920; 17 July 1920 - 24 January 1921
Minister of Education	Rıza Nur; Hamdullah Suphi (Tanrıöver)	3 May 1920 - 13 December 1920; 13 December 1920 - 24 January 1921
Minister of Public Works	İsmail Fazıl; Ömer Lütfi (Argeşo)	26 May 1920 - 27 December 1920; 27 December 1920 - 24 January 1921
Minister of Health and Social Solidarity	Adnan (Adıvar)	

== Aftermath ==
The chairman of the next cabinet was Fevzi Pasha who was the Minister of Defence in the first cabinet. After the proclamation of the Republic the Republican governments were renumbered beginning by 1st government of Turkey

Preceded by Committee of Representation	1st cabinet of the Executive Ministers of Turkey (Mustafa Kemal Pasha); 3 May 1920 – 24 January 1921	Succeeded by 2nd cabinet of the Executive Ministers of Turkey (Favzi Pasha)
