= Directorate General of Foundations =

Turkish governmental institution

The Directorate General of Foundations (Turkish: Vakıflar Genel Müdürlüğü), founded 3 March 1924, is a Turkish governmental body responsible for managing and auditing waqfs (Turkish: vakıf), which are inalienable charitable endowments established under Islamic law. These waqfs date back to the Ottoman Empire and continue to function today.

== History ==
The establishment of the Vakıflar Genel Müdürlüğü was part of Atatürk's Reforms. It was established under the authority of Prime Minister of Turkey, İsmet İnönü on 3 March 1924, alongside the Directorate of Religious Affairs (Turkish: Diyanet İşleri Başkanlığı).

These two departments replaced the Ottoman era ministry with the responsibility of governing Islamic affairs, the Ministry of Sharia and the Foundations (Turkish: Şerriye ve Evkaf Vekaleti). This ministry had survived the Turkish War of Independence into the Republican era and the 1st government of Turkey.

Aside from its stated responsibilities, a secondary aim was to enable the confiscation by the state of properties belonging to traditionally non-Muslim minorities, including Jews, Greeks, and Armenians, by transferring such properties into foundations so that they could be placed under the administration of the Vakıflar Genel Müdürlüğü. However, starting in the 1950s and 1960s, the VGM would frequently seize and dispose of real-estate assets belonging to religious minorities on the basis of dubious court decisions. A notable example of this was the confiscation of the Tuzla Armenian Children's Camp in 1984.

== Responsibilities ==
The directorate manages the estates and restorations of around 18,500 historical buildings and 67,000 estates. The directorate employs about 38,000 people. It also handles charity organisations, such as food or monetary support, based on the charters of the managed foundations. Currently, actions of 4,500 foundations are audited by the directorate.

As of March 2017 the Directorate General of Foundations has a 58.5% share stake in VakıfBank In May 2017, reports emerged that the Turkish government was considering a draft law to transfer that 58.5 percent stake, worth around $2.5 billion, to Vakıf Katılım Bankası because it is sharia-compliant.
