= Yusuf Kemal Bey =

Turkish civil servant, politician and academic

Yusuf Kemal (later surnamed Tengirşenk) Bey
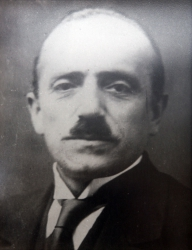

Minister of Foreign Affairs
- In office 30 March 1921 – 26 October 1922
- Prime Minister: Fevzi Pasha–Rauf Bey
- Preceded by: Bekir Sami Bey
- Succeeded by: İsmet Pasha

Personal details
- Born: 17 July 1878 Boyabat, Sinop
- Died: 15 April 1969 (aged 90)
- Party: Republican People's Party (CHP); Democrat Party; Republican Villagers Nation Party (CKMP)
- Education: Imperial School of Medicine; Istanbul University; University of Paris

Yusuf Kemal Bey (17 July 1878 – 15 April 1969) was a Turkish civil servant, politician and academic. His birth name was Yusuf Kemal. After the Turkish Surname Law in 1934, he assumed the surname Tengirşenk.

== Early life ==
He was born in Boyabat (now in Sinop Province), Ottoman Empire in 1878. While studying in the Military school of Medicine in Istanbul he was arrested by the Ottoman police for disobeying Abdülhamid II. Although he was sentenced to be exiled to Fezzan (a part of current Libya) he was pardoned due to his poor health. He studied law and graduated from the Faculty of law in Istanbul in 1904. He later took doctorate in political sciences in the University of Paris.

After the Young Turk Revolution in 1908, following a brief term in parliament he served in high civil posts.

== Political life ==
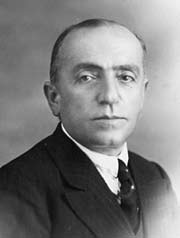
Yusuf Kemal Tengirşenk in the 1930s

After the First World War he was elected as the MP in General Assembly of the Ottoman Empire as a representative of Kastamonu Province. But the Ottoman parliament was closed by the Allies of World War I and he traveled to Ankara to join the Turkish nationalists. In the 1st and the 2nd cabinet of the Executive Ministers of Turkey he was elected as the Minister of Economy (3 May 1920 – 30 March 1921). In the second half of the 3rd cabinet of the Executive Ministers of Turkey and in the 4th cabinet of the Executive Ministers of Turkey he was elected as the Minister of Foreign Affairs (30 March 1921 – 26 October 1922). These cabinets were before the proclamation of the Turkish Republic. During the 6th government of Turkey, he was the Minister of Justice (27 October 1930 – 5 May-1931). He was candidate in the 1946 Turkish presidential election for the Democrat Party.

== Later years and death ==
After resignation from the parliament he served as the professor of Economy in the law school of Ankara University. Although he participated in the Constituent Assembly of Turkey as the representative of the Republican Villagers Nation Party he didn't return to political life. He died on 15 April 1969 at the age of 90.

Political offices
Preceded by Bekir Sami Kunduh	Minister of Foreign Affairs of Turkey; 30 March 1921–26 October 1922	Succeeded by İsmet Pasha
