= List of Lezgins in Turkey =

Notable Lezgins (people of full or partial Lezgin descent) living in the Turkey include:

- Mehmet Recep Peker, Turkish military officer and politician. A heavy-handed modernist, he served in various ministerial posts and finally as the Prime Minister of Turkey between 1946 and 1947
- Ali Nihad Tarlan, Turkish historian
- Emre Belözoğlu, former professional footballer
- Hüseyin Nail Kubalı, Turkish lawyer
