= 2nd cabinet of the Executive Ministers of Turkey =

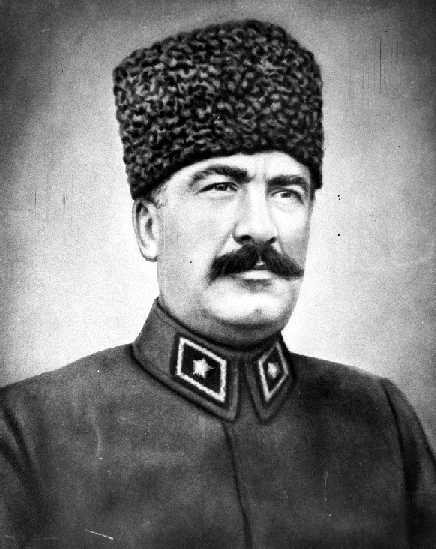
Fevzi Çakmak

The 2nd cabinet of executive ministers of Turkey (24 January 1921 – 19 May 1921 ) was the second government formed by the nationalists during the Turkish War of Independence. The Republic was not yet proclaimed and the government was called İcra vekilleri heyeti ("cabinet of executive ministers").

== Background ==
The chairman of the cabinet (equivalent to prime minister) was Fevzi Pasha (later named Çakmak) who also acted as the Minister of Defense. Both Fevzi Pasha and the other members of the cabinet were elected by the parliament one by one.

== The government ==
In the list below, the name in parathesis is the surname the cabinet members assumed later.(see Surname Law of 1934).

Title	Name	Dates
Chairman; Minister of Defence	Fevzi (Çakmak)	
Ministry of Sharia and the Foundations	Mustafa Fehmi (Gerçeker)	
Minister Justice	Celalettin Arif; Yusuf Kemal (Tengirşenk)	24 January 1921 -30 March 1921; 30 March 1921- 19 May 1921
Minister of Chief of Staff	İsmet (İnönü)	
Minister of Interior	Refet (Bele); Ata (Atalay)	24 January 1921 -21 April 1912; 21 April 1921 - 19 May 1921
Minister of Foreign Affairs	Bekir Sami (Kunduh)	
Minister of Economy	Yusuf Kemal (Tengirşenk); Celal (Bayar)	24 January 1921 - 30 March 1921; 30 March 1921 – 19 May 1921
Minister of Finance	Ahmet Ferit (Tek)	
Minister of Education	Hamdullah Suphi (Tanrıöver)	
Minister of Public Works	Ömer Lütfi (Argeşo)	
Minister of Health and Social Solidarity	Adnan (Adıvar); Refik (Saydam)	14 January 1921- 10 March 1921; 10 March 1921 - 19 May 1921

Preceded by 1st cabinet of the Executive Ministers of Turkey (Mustafa Kemal Pasha)	2nd cabinet of the Executive Ministers of Turkey (Fevzi Pasha); 24 January 1921 - 19 May 1921	Succeeded by 3rd cabinet of the Executive Ministers of Turkey (Favzi Pasha)
