= 2nd government of Turkey =

Government of the Republic of Turkey (1924)

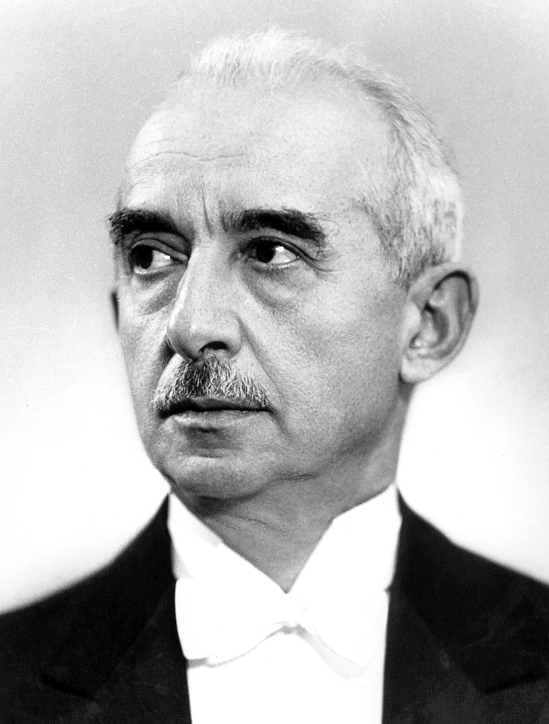
İsmet İnönü, the Prime Minister of the second government

The 2nd government of Turkey (6 March 1924 – 22 November 1924) was the second government in the history of the Republic of Turkey.

== Background ==
The prime minister was İsmet İnönü of the Republican People's Party (CHP, than known as People’s Party). İnönü was also the prime minister of the first government, but following a radical change in the structure of the government (the abolition of two critical ministries), İnönü formed his second government.

== The government ==
In the list below, the cabinet members who served only a part of the cabinet's lifespan are shown in the column "Notes".

Title	Name	Notes
Prime Minister and Ministry of Foreign Affairs	İsmet İnönü	
Ministry of Justice	Mustafa Necati Uğural	
Ministry of National Defense	Kazım Özalp	
Ministry of the Interior	Ahmet Ferit Tek	
Ministry of Finance	Abdülhalik Renda; Recep Peker	6 March 1924 – 21 May 1924; 21 May 1924 – 22 November 1924
Ministry of National Education	Vasıf Çınar	
Ministry of Public Works	Süleyman Sırrı	
Ministry of Health	Refik Saydam	
Ministry of Exchange Construction and Settlement	Celal Bayar; Refet Canıtez	6 March 1924 – 7 July 1924; 7 July 1924 – 5 November 1924
Ministry of Commerce	Hasan Saka	
Ministry of Agriculture	Zekai Apaydın; Şükrü Kaya	6 March 1924 – 20 August 1924; 20 August 1924 – 22 November 1924

In 1924, surnames were not in use in Turkey, which would remain true until the Surname Law. The surnames given in the list are the surnames the members of the cabinet assumed later.

== Aftermath ==
After the formation of a strong opposition, i.e., Progressive Republican Party (TCP), the president Mustafa Kemal Atatürk assigned Fethi Okyar, a moderate politician, as the prime minister, in his first effort to jump-start a multi-party democracy in Turkey.

== Trivia ==
Four members of this government were future prime ministers: Recep Peker, Refik Saydam, Celal Bayar, and Hasan Saka.

Preceded by 1st government of Turkey (İsmet İnönü)	2nd Government of Turkey; 6 March 1924 – 22 November 1924	Succeeded by 3rd government of Turkey (Fethi Okyar)
