= Turkish Communist Party (official) =

Historical political party in Turkey

Turkish Communist Party Türkiye Komünist Fırkası
- Abbreviation: TKF
- President: Hakkı Behiç Bayiç
- Founder: Mustafa Kemal Atatürk
- Founded: October 18, 1920
- Dissolved: March 1921
- Headquarters: Ankara
- Ideology: Communism (nominal)

The Turkish Communist Party (Turkish: Türkiye Komünist Fırkası, TKF), often referred to as the "official" (resmî) communist party, was a political party in Turkey.

== History ==
=== Foundation ===
The TKF was set up by Mustafa Kemal Atatürk in October 1920 in order to counter the influence of the Communist Party of Turkey (TKP). The party organ was Anadoluda Yeni Gün. Yunus Nadi Abalıoğlu was the editor of the party organ.

=== TKF and Comintern ===
At the end of 1920, the party applied for Comintern membership. On 22 November 1920, with the approval of the Grand National Assembly of Turkey, Turkish government sent a four-member delegation led by Tevfik Rüştü Aras on a mission to establish links with the Soviet government. On 8 June 1921, Tevfik Rüştü Aras published an article in support of the Turkish War of Independence in the French-language Comintern newspaper named Moscou. Following pressure by the Communist Party of Turkey, TKF was not accepted to the 3rd World Congress of the Communist International as a member.

=== Ban ===
After the Çerkes Ethem uprising, all left wing parties including TKF were banned. Atatürk disbanded the party after a short existence of 3 months.
