= Emel Esin =

Turkish art historian (1912 or 1914 - 1987)

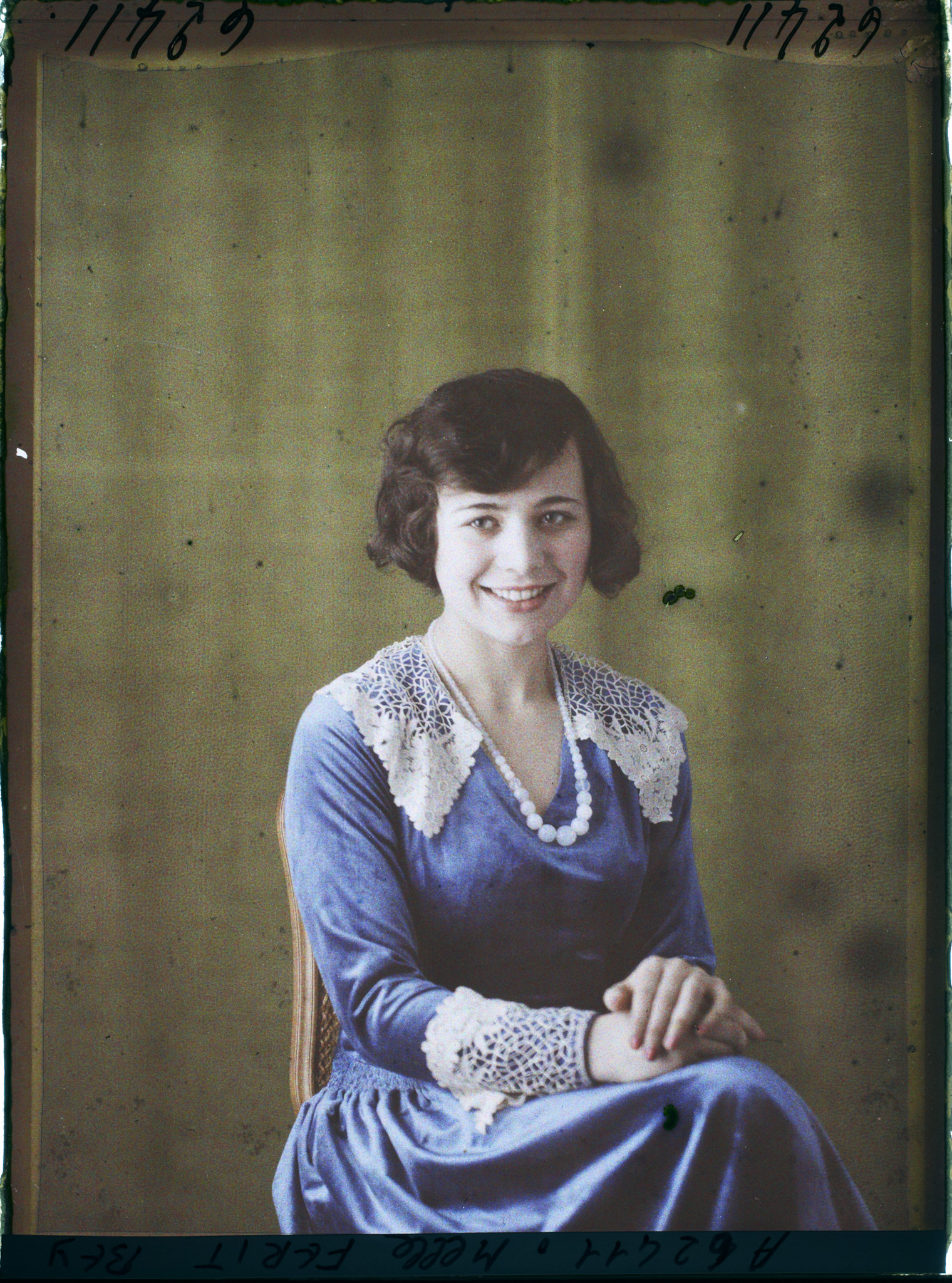
Emel Esin in 1930

Emel Esin (1912 or 1914 – 26 February 1987) was a Turkish art historian.

== Early life and education ==
Esin was born in 1912 or 1914 in Istanbul. Her father was Ahmet Ferit Tek, a soldier, diplomat and politician; her mother was Müfide Ferit Tek, a writer.

She studied at the École libre des sciences politiques in Paris, graduating in 1933. In 1969 she gained a doctorate from the University of Paris Faculty of Humanities, her thesis title being Le Dragon dans l’iconographie turque (The Dragon in Turkish iconography).

== Career ==
Her publications include Mecca the blessed, Madinah the radiant (1963: Elek Books) with photographs by Haluk Doganbey.

In 1963 her account of a Hajj pilgrimage to Mecca as published in this book was banned in Pakistan because it contained reproductions of fourteenth- and fifteenth-century Turkish miniatures showing prophet Muhammad unveiled.

== Death and legacy ==
Esin died on 26 February 1987 in Istanbul. In her will she established the TEK‐ESİN Foundation, which operates a library and archive to further research into Turkish history of art, in the restored 18th-century Ottoman Sadullah Pasha Mansion.

The National Portrait Gallery in London holds a photographic portrait of Esin, taken in 1930 by the Lafayette studio.

== Selected publications ==
- Mecca the blessed, Madinah the radiant. Text, Emel Esin; photographs by Haluk Doganbey (1963, London: Elek Books)
- Turkish Miniature Paintings (1965, Rutland, Vermont: Charles Tuttle)
- Oriental miniatures : Persian, Indian, Turkish (1965, London: Souvenir Press), co-edited with William Lillys and Robert Reiff
- Aspects of Turkish civilisation in Cyprus (1965, Ankara: Türk Kültürünü Araştırma Enstitüsü)
- Antecedents and development of Buddhist and Manichean Turkish art in eastern Turkestan and Kansu: The handbook of Turkish culture, supplement to volume II, section of the history of art (1967, Istanbul : Mıllî Eğıtıim Basimevı)
- Turkish Art in Cyprus (1969, Ankara : Ayyildiz Matbaasi)
- Türk kosmolojisi (ilk devir üzerine araştırmaler) : Early Turkish cosmology (essays in Turkish with English abstracts) (1979, Istanbul : Edebiyat Fakültesi Matbaası)
- A history of pre-Islamic and early-Islamic Turkish culture: supplement to the handbook of Turkish culture (1980, Istanbul: Unal Matbaasi)
- The culture of the Turks : the initial inner Asian phase (1986, Ankara : Atatürk Culture Centre)
