= Ministry of Construction and Settlement (Turkey) =

Former government ministry of Turkey

Ministry of Construction and Settlement (Turkish: İmar ve İskan Bakanlığı) was a government ministry office in Turkey.

== 1923–1925 ==
According to Population exchange agreement between Greece and Turkey, the Greek Orthodox population in Turkey and the Moslem population in Greece were exchanged in the 1920s. The refugees would be provided with new possessions totaling the ones they had left behind. Listing the possessions of the Orthodox people who left Turkey and assigning them to the Moslem people from Greece was a formidable task for the bureaucracy of the newly established Turkey and a separate ministry was formed to solve the problems of the exchange and settlement on 30 October 1923. During the 1st and the 2nd government of Turkey the name of the ministry was Ministry of Exchange, Construction and Settlement. During the 3rd government of Turkey the Minister of Interior was also the Minister of Exchange, Construction and Settlement between 22 November 1924 – 3 March 1925. After the 3rd government the ministry was abolished.

== 1957–1983 ==
However, in the 1950s during the large-scale migration from the villages to cities the ministry was reestablished with the name the Ministry of Construction and Settlement. The ministry was established in the 23rd government of Turkey and was merged to the Ministry of Public Works in the 45th government i.e., it was effective between 25 November 1957 – 13 December 1983.
