= Bekir Sami Kunduh =

Turkish politician and first Minister of Foreign Affairs

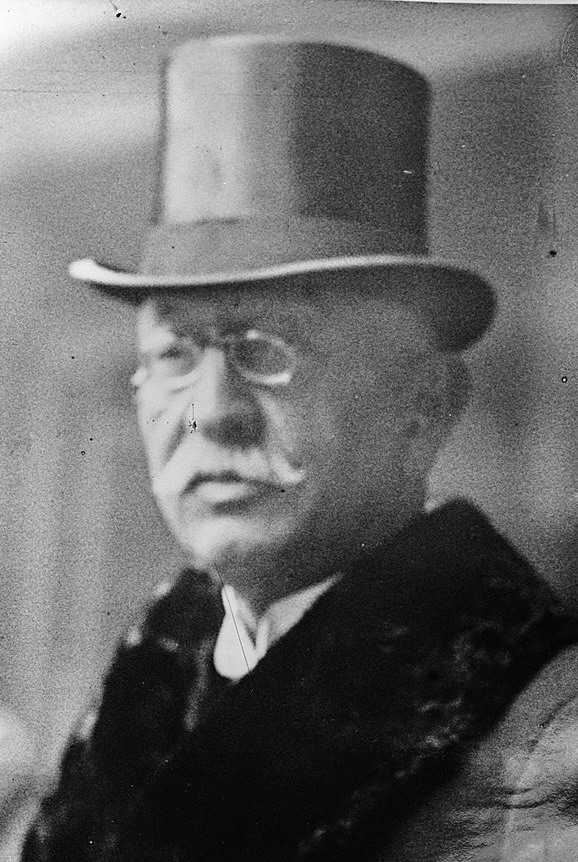

Deputy of the Turkish Grand National Assembly
- In office 3 May 1920 – 8 May 1921
- Succeeded by: Ahmet Muhtar Mollaoğlu

Minister of Foreign Affairs
- In office 3 May 1920 – 8 May 1921
- Preceded by: Office established
- Succeeded by: Yusuf Kemal Bey

Personal details
- Born: 1867 Saniba, Russian Empire
- Died: 16 January 1933 (aged 66) Istanbul, Turkey
- Education: Galatasaray High School
- Alma mater: Sciences Po Paris

Bekir Sami Bey (known as Bekir Sami Kunduh in modern Turkish sources; Iron Ossetic: Къуындыхаты Муссæйы фырт Бечыр; 1867 – 16 January 1933) was a Turkish politician of Ossetian origin. He served as the first Minister of Foreign Affairs of Turkey during 1920–1921.

== Biography ==
=== Early career ===
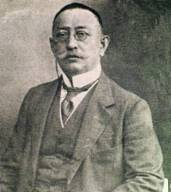
Bekir Sami Kunduh, unknown date

Bekir Sami was born in Saniba, Ossetia. He was a son of Musa Kunduh Pasha (Musa Kundukhov; (1818–1889)), a Tagaur Ossetian chieftain and major-general in the Russian Imperial Army, who later defected to the Ottoman Empire. He earned his Baccalaureate from Galatasaray High School and went to Paris to study political science.

He worked at the Turkish embassy at St. Petersburg and then was appointed as Mutasarrıf of Amasya. Later in his career, he served successively as governor of Van, Trabzon, Bursa, Beirut and Aleppo. His last appointment before the 30 October 1918 Armistice of Mudros that ended World War I between the Ottoman Empire and the Allies was as governor of Beirut.

=== Post-World War I ===
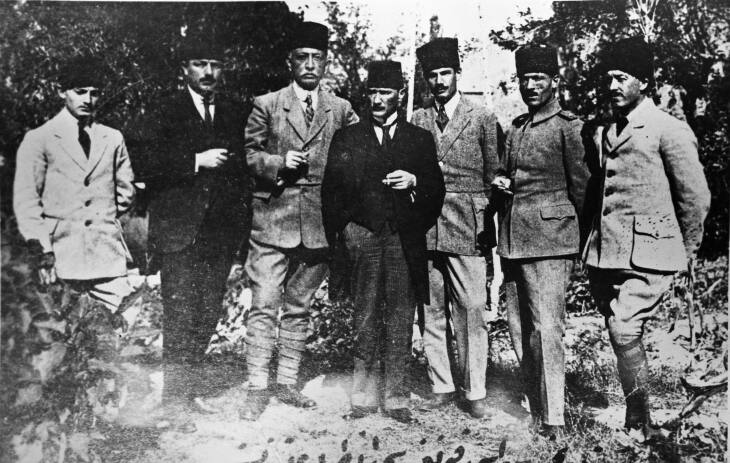
Prominent nationalists at the Sivas Congress. Left to right: Muzaffer Kılıç, Rauf (Orbay), Bekir Sami (Kunduh), Mustafa Kemal (Atatürk), Ruşen Eşref (Ünaydın), Cemil Cahit (Toydemir), Cevat Abbas (Gürer)

Shortly after the armistice, Bekir Sami became a leading member of the Karakol society, alongside other former influential members of the Committee of Union and Progress. Karakol was a secret Turkish nationalist organization formed in October or November 1918 to continue various aspects of the CUP's covert work, such as resistance to the Allied occupation, resistance to partition of Anatolia, and concealment of former CUP members accused of participation in the Armenian genocide.

Summoned to Anatolia by Mustafa Kemal, Bekir Sami attended the Erzurum and Sivas congresses (July – September 1919), after which he joined the ranks of Turkish revolutionaries negotiating a united position with the Ottoman imperial government. Bekir Sami's name therefore appears as one of the signatories to the 22 October 1919 Amasya Protocol. One provision of the protocol was to hold fresh parliamentary elections, and in these Bekir Sami was elected to represent Amasya in the final Ottoman Chamber of Deputies which was seated in Istanbul on 12 January 1920. The new chamber barely lasted two months. Allied forces occupied Istanbul on 16 March and the chamber went into recess. Three days later, Mustafa Kemal announced the establishment of the Ankara-based Grand National Assembly of Turkey. Bekir Sami was one of 70 nationalist deputies who moved to Ankara and took a seat as a deputy at the new assembly's first meeting on 23 April 1920.

When Mustafa Kemal formed his first cabinet on 3 May 1920, Bekir Sami was named as the minister of foreign affairs. (After the 1923 founding of the Republic of Turkey, this cabinet was retrospectively designated as the republic's first, and Bekir Sami thereby became its first foreign minister). Representing Turkey, he led the nationalist government's delegation to the Soviet Union.

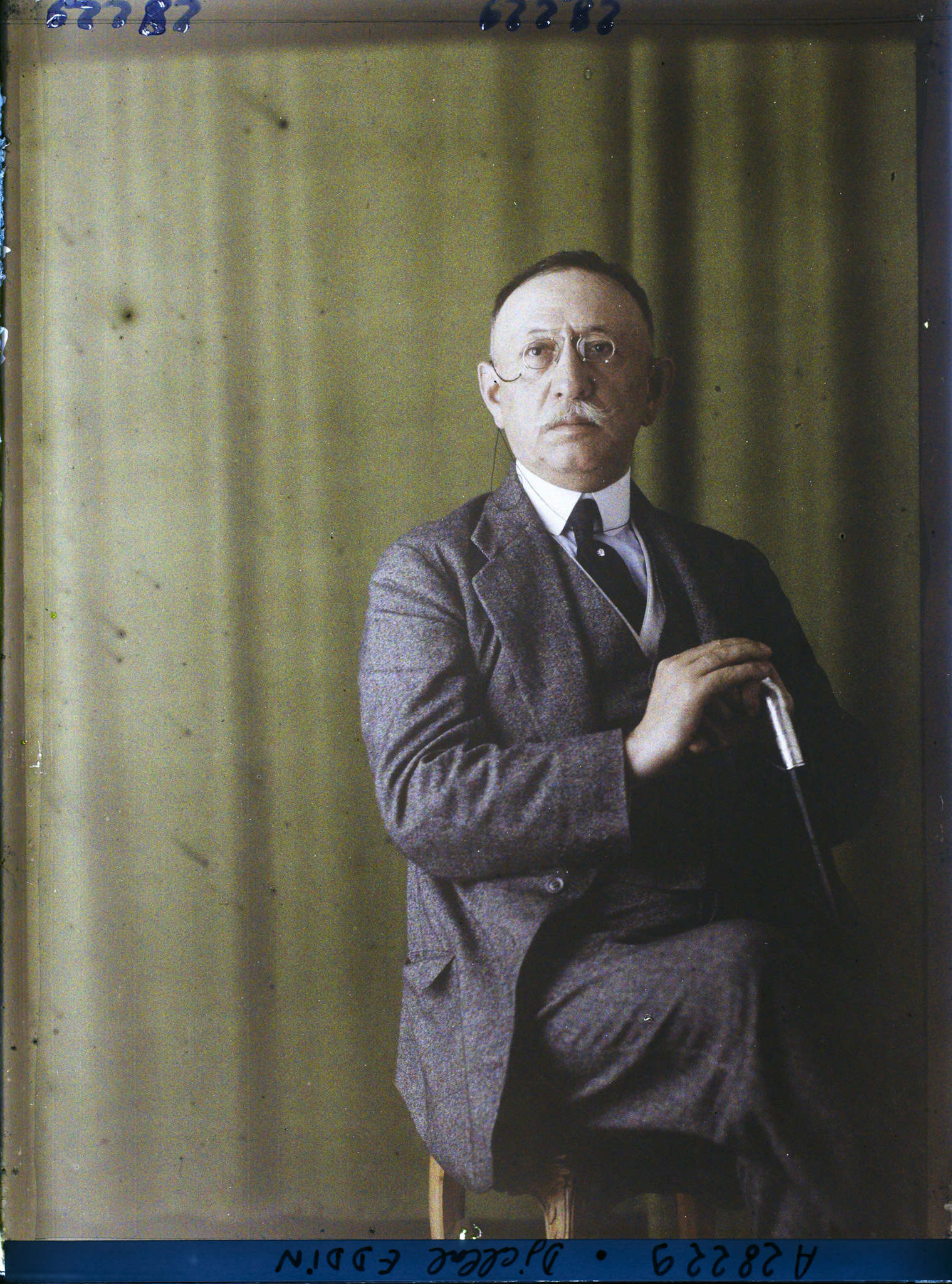
Autochrome portrait by Auguste Léon, 1921

Between 21 February and 12 March 1921 he led the Turkish delegation to the Conference of London. By this point in the post-war negotiations, a major sticking point was the trial and punishment of Turkish prisoners held by the British on the island of Malta. Previous post-war Ottoman governments, aiming to stave off aggressive territorial ambitions by the victorious allies, had felt a need to acquiesce to the Allies' pressure for an international court or foreign power to try Turks accused of wartime crimes. Nationalist opinion in Turkey rejected this trade-off and Bekir Sami communicated to the Allies that Turkey would not accept foreign trials for the prisoners in Malta. As reported by the British Foreign Secretary Lord Curzon, Bekir Sami:

contrasted the situation of the German war crimes suspects with that of the Turkish suspects. ... He tried to reassure me that they are ready to punish those [responsible for the] crimes ... then he said this task must be left to his government.

Despite Bekir Sami's advocacy, the version of the London Agreement drafted by the British required Turkey to release all British prisoners, while Britain retained the right to detain and try anyone involved in massacres of Armenians or who had attacked British soldiers. The nationalist assembly viewed the London Agreement as a violation of Turkish sovereignty and Bekir Sami as having acted beyond the authority that the government had given him. After his return to Ankara, he resigned his office as foreign minister on 8 May 1921.

On 17 September 1924 he was one of the founders of the Progressive Republican Party of Turkey, at the request of Mustafa Kemal. The party only lasted nine months until it was ordered dissolved on 5 June 1925 following the Sheikh Said rebellion. When there was an attempt on Mustafa Kemal's life in İzmir in 1926, Bekir Sami was among many who were arrested. He was acquitted at trial.

Bekir Sami died in Istanbul on 16 January 1933. Although he did not have a surname during his lifetime, the Surname Law was adopted the year after his death, and his family adopted the surname Kunduh.

== Sources ==
- Akçam, Taner (2006). A Shameful Act: The Armenian Genocide and the Question of Turkish Responsibility. Translated by Bessemer, Paul. Metropolitan Books.
