= Ahmet Ferit Tek =

Turkish politician and diplomat

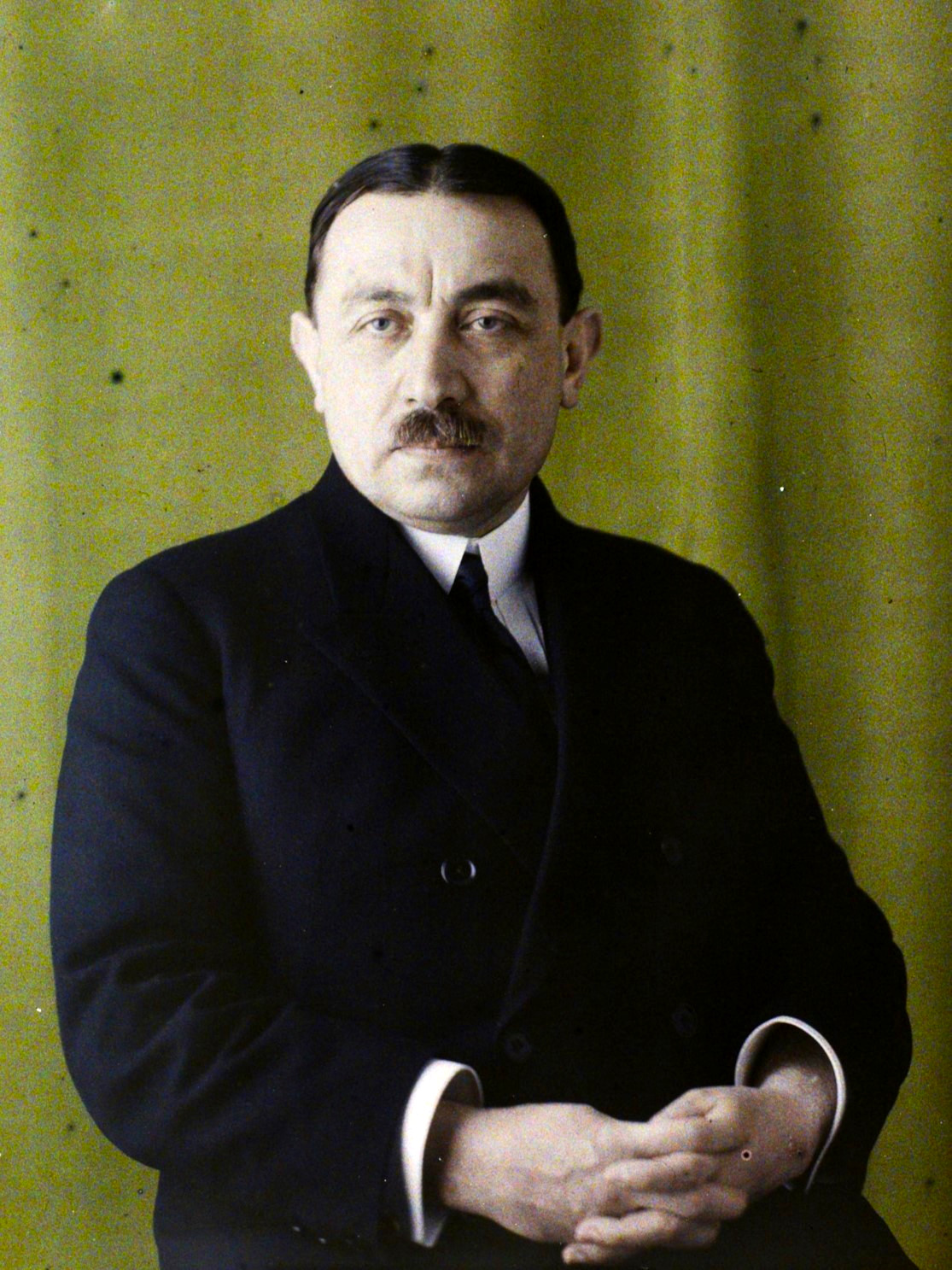
- 1923 autochrome

Minister of Finance
- In office 17 July 1920 – 19 May 1921
- Preceded by: Hakkı Behiç Bayiç
- Succeeded by: Hasan Saka

Minister of the Interior
- In office 30 October 1923 – 21 May 1924
- President: Mustafa Kemal Atatürk
- Prime Minister: İsmet İnönü
- Preceded by: Ali Fethi Okyar
- Succeeded by: Recep Peker

Ambassador to Great Britain
- In office 1925–1932

Ambassador to Poland
- In office 1932–1939

Ambassador to Japan
- In office 1939–1943

Personal details
- Born: Ahmet Ferit; 1877 Bursa, Ottoman Empire
- Died: November 25, 1971 (aged 93–94) Istanbul, Turkey

Ahmet Ferit Tek (1877 – 25 November 1971) was an Ottoman-born Turkish military officer, academic, politician, government minister and diplomat.

== Early life ==
Ahmet Ferit Tek was born to Mustafa Reşit, an accountant at the Ottoman Ministry of Finance, and his wife Hanife Leyla in Bursa in 1877. According to another source, he was born on 7 March 1878.

He studied at Kuleli Military High School, and graduated from the Turkish Military Academy in the rank of a Loeutnant.

== In exile ==
He joined the Young Turks movement, which aimed the restoration of the suspended Ottoman constitution of 1876. He was arrested and exiled to Ottoman Tripolitania, what is today part of Libya. However, he managed to escape to Paris, France, via Tunis. In Paris, he studied political science, and graduated. During this time, he also wrote for Şura-yı Ümmet ("People's Council", 1902–1929), an Ottoman periodical published by the Committee of Union and Progress of the Young Turks movement. After living in Kazan, Russian Empire between 1903 and 1908, he settled in Egypt. In Cairo, he wrote for the magazine Türk.

== Return to home ==
In 1908, Ahmet Ferit returned to Istanbul, and was appointed history professor at Istanbul University's School of Political Science. He co-founded "Milli Meşrutiyet Fırkası" ("National Constitutional Monarchy Party"). The ideas in the party programme of the nationalistic movement were "The Turks had fought on the frontiers of the Empire for centuries. They had to neglect their own land. Anatolia, the heart of Turkish territories, is uncared. The time has come for Turks to think over their own national destiny." On 25 March 1912, he co-founded Türk Ocakları (Turkish Hearths), a nationalistic organization, with Mehmet Emin Yurdakul (1869–1944), Ahmet Ağaoğlu (1869–1939), Yusuf Akçura (1876–1935) and some others. He was elected chairman of the organization in the first board meeting succeeding Yurdakul, the founding president. He published the newspaper İlham ("Inspiration"), where he wrote hot.

== Turkish War of Independence and Republican era ==
During the Turkish War of Independence, he supported the Kemalists. He entered the newly established parliament in Ankara as a deputy of Istanbul. He was appointed Minister of Finance in the 1st cabinet of the Executive Ministers in the Government of the Grand National Assembly on 17 July 1920. He served at this post until the end of the 2nd cabinet of the Executive Ministers on 19 May 1921. He took part in the Turkish delegation sent to the Conference of Lausanne (1922–1923). After the proclamation of the Turkish Republic, he remained in the parliament as a deputy of Kütahya, and was appointed the Minister of the Interior in the 1st and the 2nd cabinet of İsmet İnönü between 30 October 1923 and 22 November 1924.

After 1925, he chose a diplomatic career. He was appointed ambassador to London (1925–1932), Warsaw (1932–1939), and Tokyo (1939–1943).

== Private life ==
Ahmet Ferit married Müfide Meryem Fevziyye in Paris in 1907. Ahmet Ferit and she met each other in Tripoli of Ottoman Libya, where he was in exile and she was because of her father's service. They escaped from Tripoli to Paris, where she got married at the age of 15. From this marriage, a daughter Emel Esin, who became an art historian, was born. Müfide Tek became later a renowned novelist.

Ahmet Ferit Tek died in Istanbul on 25 November 1971, eight months after his wife's death.

Political offices
Preceded by Hakkı Behiç Bayiç	Minister of Finance; 17 July 1920 – 19 May 1921	Succeeded by Hasan Saka
Preceded by Ali Fethi Okyar	Minister of the Interior; 30 October 1923 – 21 May 1924	Succeeded by Recep Peker
