= 1st government of Turkey =

Government of the Republic of Turkey (1923-1924)

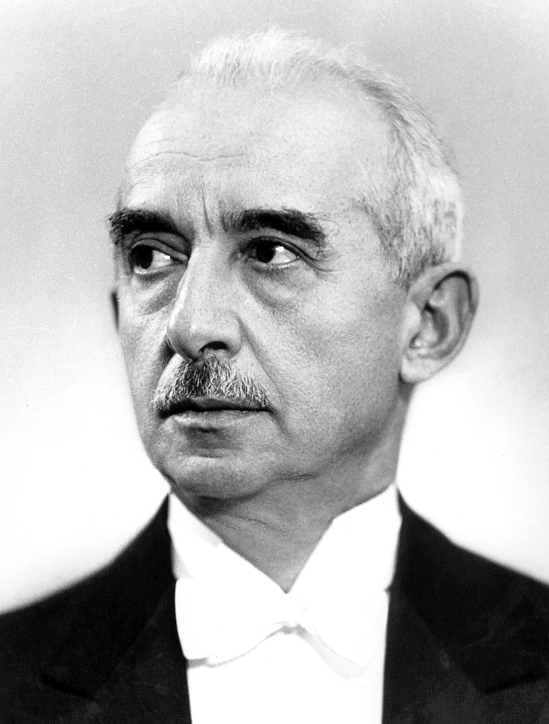
İsmet İnönü

The 1st government of Turkey (30 October 1923 – 6 March 1924) was the first government formed in the Republic of Turkey. In reality, there were other governments between 23 April 1920 and 29 October 1923, but the republic was proclaimed on 29 October 1923, and the governments were numbered only after this date.

== Background ==
The first prime minister was İsmet İnönü of the Republican People's Party (CHP, than known as People's Party). Although İnönü was a successful general during the Turkish War of Independence, he had also proved himself an able politician during the talks of Armistice of Mudanya and the Treaty of Lausanne.

== The government ==
In the list below, the cabinet members who served only a part of the cabinet's lifespan are shown in the column "Notes".

Title	Name	Notes
Prime Minister and Ministry of Foreign Affairs	İsmet İnönü	
Ministry of Sharia and the Foundations	Fevzi Sarhan	
Minister of General Staff	Fevzi Çakmak	
Ministry of Justice	Seyit	
Ministry of National Defense	Kazım Özalp	
Ministry of the Interior	Ahmet Ferit Tek	
Ministry of Finance	Hasan Fehmi Ataç; Abdülhalik Renda	30 October 1923 – 2 January 1924; 2 January 1924 – 6 March 1924
Ministry of National Education	Sefa Özler	
Ministry of Public Works	Ahmet Muhtar Cilli; Süleyman Sırrı	30 October 1923 – 19 January 1924; 19 January 1924 – 6 March 1924
Ministry of Health	Refik Saydam	
Ministry of Exchange Construction and Settlement	Mustafa Necati Uğural	
Ministry of Economy	Hasan Saka	

In 1923–1924, surnames were not in use in Turkey, which would remain true until the Surname Law. The surnames given in the list are the surnames the members of the cabinet assumed later.

== Aftermath ==
Ministry of Shariah was taken over from the Ottoman Empire, and the Ministry of General Staff was a temporary ministry which was active during the war of independence. Both ministries were abolished on 3 March 1924, and İsmet İnönü resigned to form a new government.

Preceded by 5th cabinet of the Executive Ministers in Turkey (Fethi Okyar)	1st Government of Turkey; 30 October 1923 – 6 March 1924	Succeeded by 2nd government of Turkey (İsmet İnönü)
