= Rıza Nur =

Turkish surgeon, politician and writer

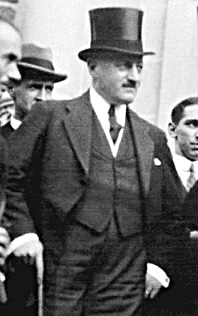
- Born: 30 August 1879; Sinop, Ottoman Empire
- Died: 8 September 1942 (aged 63); Istanbul, Turkey
- Resting place: Merkezefendi Cemetery, Istanbul
- Education: Medicine
- Alma mater: Military Medical School
- Occupations: Surgeon, politician, writer

Rıza Nur (30 August 1879 – 8 September 1942) was a Turkish surgeon, politician and writer. He was prominent in the years immediately after the First World War, where he served as a cabinet minister but was subsequently marginalised, and became a critic of Atatürk. His acclaimed autobiography Hayat ve Hatıratım was written from exile in France and Egypt as an alternative narrative to Atatürk's famous speech Nutuk that has dominated the historiography of Turkey. Like Halide Edib and Rauf Orbay, Rıza Nur's work is part of a body of early Republican literature that sought plurality in the increasingly authoritarian Turkish Republic.

== Early years ==
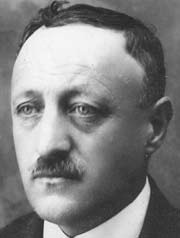
Rıza Nur in the 1920s

Nur was born on 30 August 1879 in Sinop. After graduating from the Military Medical School in 1901 Rıza Nur went on to work as a surgeon at Gülhane Military Hospital before returning to the Military Medical School as an academic in 1907. Before this, an early posting had seen him serve on the border with Bulgaria where his job was to check if imported flour was contaminated with killer germs, after the Sultan had claimed this to be the case. The somewhat foolish nature of the work, as well as the refusal of his superiors to supply Rıza with a microscope and other basic scientific tools, helped to convince him that Abdul Hamid II's rule was backward, corrupt and leading Turkey into severe decline.

He had also engaged in what he called in his memoir a period of "philandering," during which he contracted gonorrhea twice, experiences that, along with his medical training, informed his 1907 book Protection from Venereal Diseases.

He entered politics following the adoption of a constitutional monarchy but was imprisoned and later exiled for coming into conflict with the Committee of Union and Progress (CUP) administration, remaining a dissenting voice from abroad. Feeling that Turkey was too reliant on Germany but accepting that the country needed a close relationship with a bigger power to prosper he toyed with the idea of a United States mandate in Turkey in the immediate aftermath of World War I.

== In government ==
Returning to Turkey in 1919 he was a founder member of the Grand National Assembly of Turkey and was appointed Minister of National Education in 1920 and Minister of Health and Public Assistance in 1921, as well as serving as the envoy at the 1921 Treaty of Moscow and the Conference of Lausanne. For Kemal Atatürk, Rıza was an important appointment as his presence in government, along with that of Ahmet Ferit, lent weight to Atatürk's claims to being a uniting force, as both men had been opponents of the CUP which provided most government ministers.

During the negotiations of the Treaty of Lausanne Rıza was sent as assistant to the head of the Turkish delegation İsmet İnönü. He was in the subcommittee responsible for minority issues and he defended the view that a Muslim minority would not be acceptable for Turkey. He drew a comparison between the Kizilbash and the Muslims, which he claimed are both ethnic Turks. He opposed the inclusion of Kurds, Bosniaks or Circassians as minorities in any agreement reached at Lausanne. It was he who proposed the motions recognizing the Grand National Assembly as the legitimate government of Turkey, the end of the monarchy but the continuing control of the Caliphate by the Turkish government. However whilst at Lausanne he also came to blows with the former Prime Minister of Greece Eleftherios Venizelos over the issue of the Pontic Greeks. Indeed what the Allies saw as Rıza's intransigence over both this issue and that of the Armenians led to a Yugoslavian delegate claiming that Rıza was "beginning to show the cloven hoof".

Rıza Nur had negative views of Albanians as being inclined to banditry which formed his view to press for their exclusion from the population exchange Between Greece and Turkey (1923) to which Greece agreed. Nur expressed displeasure that Albanians had arrived as Turks from Greece contravening the exchange agreement and that they were resettled in areas such as Kartal, Pendik and Erenköy, west of İzmit considered to be high quality lands and in Ankara. Nur also accused Abdülhalik Renda, the Governor of İzmir, of encouraging his Albanian compatriots (refugees and immigrants) to resettle from other Anatolian regions to İzmir, claims which Renda denied. Nur also had negative views of Circassians in Turkey and along with the Albanians viewed them as a threat to the Turkish state due to developing rival nationalisms.

== Later years ==
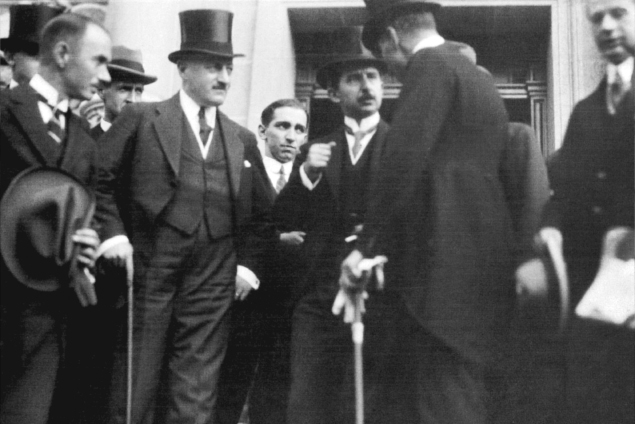
Turkish delegation after having signed the Treaty of Lausanne. The delegation was led by İsmet İnönü (in the middle) and Rıza Nur (on the left wearing the top hat)

Following the formation of the Turkish Republic, Rıza Nur fell out of favour and left Turkey in 1926 after the attempt on the life of Atatürk at İzmir. Rıza condemned the executions of Mehmet Cavit Bey and the other alleged assassination conspirators arguing that, whilst he personally disliked the men who had been his own political opponents, he felt that they had not been involved in the plot and so were unjustly killed. Embittered at the fall-out with his former ally, Rıza also wrote widely about Atatürk's alleged alcoholism. Between 1931 and 1937 published the Revue de Turcologie in French and Turkish language, which founded in Paris, was issued in Alexandria. Returning from exile in Paris and Alexandria after Atatürk's death, in 1942 he published the journal Tanrıdağı, which supported Turanism and pan-Turkism. The journal's name refers to the Central Asian mountain range Tien Shan, a region inhabited by ancient Turkic tribes.

Rıza Nur was also a noted writer on a number of topics, with his most well-known work being a history of Turkey in 14 volumes.

He died at the age of 63.

== Works ==
- Emrâz-ı Zühreviyeden Tahaffuz Belsoğukluğuna ve Frengiye Yakalanmamak Çaresi (Protection from Venereal Diseases: Prevention Methods for Syphilis and Gonorrhea) (1907)
- Servet-i Şahane ve Hakk-ı Millet (Royal Wealth and the Right of the People) (1909)
- Meclis-i Mebusan'dan Fırkalar (Parties of the Chamber of Deputies) (1910)
- Tıbbiye Hayatından (Of Medical Life) (1911)
- Cemiyet-i Hafiye (The Secret Organization) (1914)
- Gurbet Dağarcığı (The Vocabulary of the Exile) (1919)
- Hürriyet ve İtilaf Nasıl Doğdu, Nasıl Öldü (The Freedom and Accord Party: How Was it Born and How Did it Die?) (1919)
- Türk Tarihi (Turkic History, 14 vols) (1924–26)
- Arab Şiir Biligi (The Arab Poetry) (1926)
- Hilalin Tarihi (History of the Crescent) (1933)
- Ali Şir Nevai (1935)
- Namık Kemal (1936)
- Hücumlara Cevaplar (Replies to the Attacks Made) (1941)
- Hayat ve Hatıratım (My Life and Memoirs) (1968)

== Sources ==
- Gingeras, Ryan (2009). Sorrowful Shores: Violence, Ethnicity, and the End of the Ottoman Empire 1912–1923. Oxford: Oxford University Press. ISBN 9780199561520.
