= Şükrü Saracoğlu =

5th Prime Minister of the Republic of Turkey from 1942 to 1946

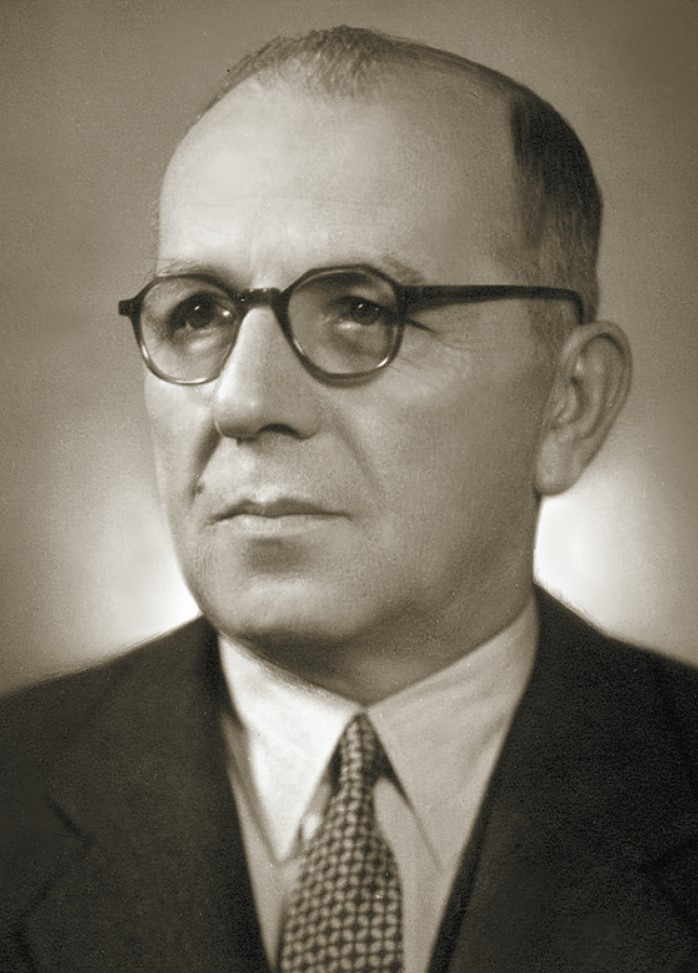
- Saracoğlu in 1931

5th Prime Minister of Turkey
- In office 9 July 1942 – 7 August 1946
- President: İsmet İnönü
- Preceded by: Ahmet Fikri Tüzer
- Succeeded by: Recep Peker

7th Speaker of the Grand National Assembly
- In office 1 November 1948 – 22 May 1950
- President: İsmet İnönü
- Prime Minister: Hasan Saka; Şemsettin Günaltay
- Preceded by: Ali Fuat Cebesoy
- Succeeded by: Refik Koraltan

Member of the Grand National Assembly
- In office 28 June 1923 – 14 May 1950
- Constituency: Izmir (1923, 1927, 1931, 1935, 1939, 1943, 1946)

Personal details
- Born: Mehmet Şükrü; 17 June 1887 Ödemiş, Ottoman Empire
- Died: 27 December 1953 (aged 66) Istanbul, Turkey
- Party: Republican People's Party (CHP)
- Spouse: Saadet Saracoğlu
- Relations: Rüşdü Saracoğlu (grandson)
- Education: İzmir İdadisi (İzmir High School); Mekteb-i Mülkiye; University of Geneva

Mehmet Şükrü Saracoğlu (Turkish pronunciation: [ˈʃycɾy saɾaˈdʒoːɫu]; 17 June 1887 – 27 December 1953) was a Turkish politician, the fifth prime minister of Turkey and the Turkish Minister of Foreign Affairs during the early stages of World War II. He signed the German–Turkish Treaty of Friendship in 1941, which would prevent Turkish involvement in the war. He was also the chairman of the Turkish sports club Fenerbahçe S.K. for 16 years between 1934 and 1950, including holding that post concurrently with his time as prime minister from 1942 to 1946.

== Early life ==
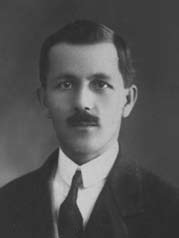
Şükrü Saracoğlu in his early days

Born in Ödemiş in the Ottoman Empire in 1887, Mehmet Şükrü was the son of Saraç Mehmet Tevfik Usta. He completed primary and middle school in Ödemiş and high school in the prestigious İzmir İdadi in İzmir and graduated from the Istanbul School of Civil Service (Mekteb-i Mülkiye) halla in 1909.

For a while, he worked as officer of attendance and performed as mathematics teacher in İzmir High School in Sultaniye. In 1915, he studied in the Academy of Political Sciences in Geneva, Switzerland, for the account of İzmir.

During the Greco-Turkish War (1919–22) (the Western Front of the larger Turkish War of Independence), he returned to Turkey and fought in the region of Kuşadası, Aydın, and Nazilli.

== Political career ==
He was elected to the Grand National Assembly of Turkey from İzmir in 1923. He was appointed as Minister of National Education in the cabinet of Prime Minister Fethi Okyar. He then presided over the Commission for Composite Population Exchange, which would conduct the negotiations with the Greek government later on. He was appointed as the Minister of Finance in the cabinet formed by Prime Minister İsmet Pasha (İnönü). After resigning, he was sent to the United States to complete some contacts about economic issues in 1931 and presided over the board going to the Paris Treaty of 1933 to solve the Ottoman public debt issue. In 1933, he reentered Cabinet as the Minister of Justice and performed as the Minister of Foreign Affairs in the second cabinet of Prime Minister Celal Bayar.

After the 1934 Surname Law, which required all Turkish citizens to adopt a surname, Mehmet Şükrü took on the surname "Saracoğlu", meaning "son of Saraç", Saraç being the epithet of his father.

In the closing days of World War II, he took part in the negotiations with the Soviet Union in Moscow for months.

Upon the death of Refik Saydam in 1942, he was assigned as the prime minister and resigned because of illness. He was elected as the president of the Grand National Assembly in 1948 and remained until 1950.

== Later life ==
Saracoğlu, who retired from political life in 1950, was fluent in French and English. He was married and had three children.

He died on 27 December 1953.

The home of the Turkish football club Fenerbahçe, Şükrü Saracoğlu Stadium, is named after him. His grandchild Rüşdü Saracoğlu was an economist and politician.

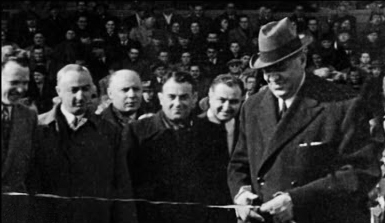
Şükrü Saracoğlu during the opening ceremony of the Fenerbahçe Stadium in 1934

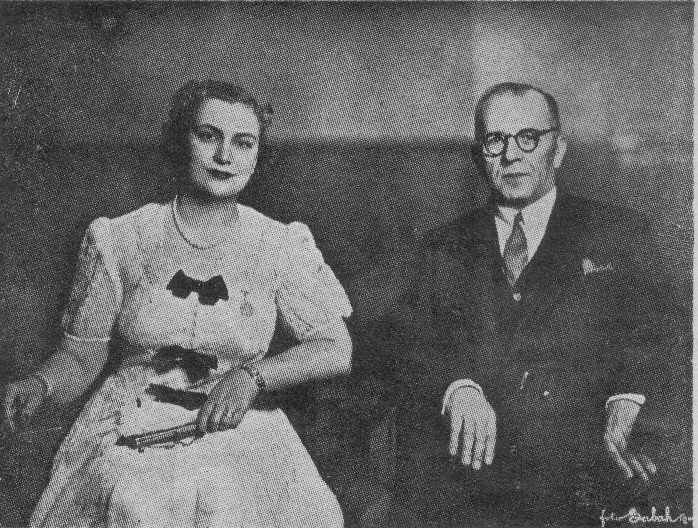
Şükrü Saracoğlu with his wife

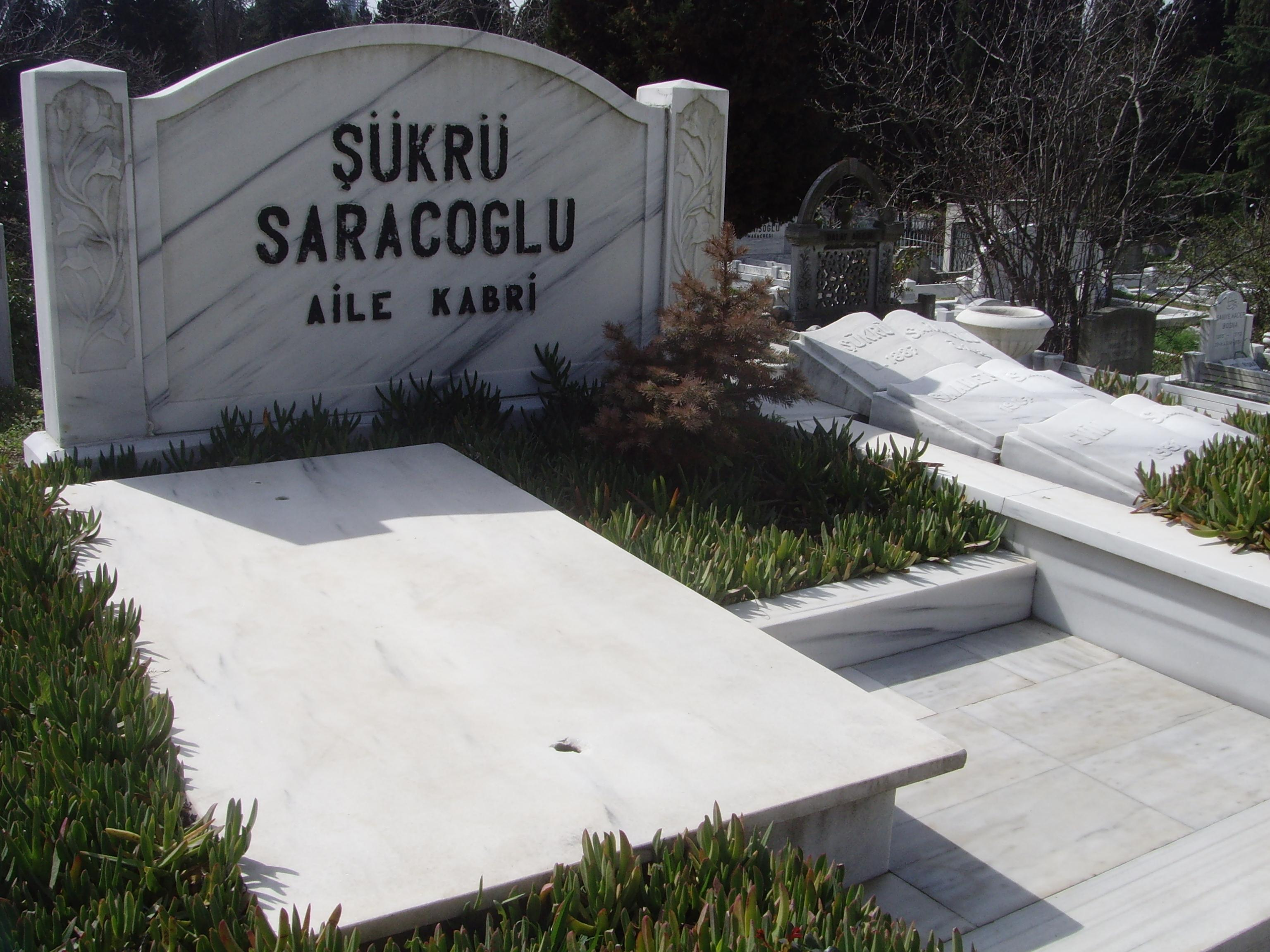
The grave of Şükrü Saracoğlu in Istanbul

== See also ==
- 13th government of Turkey

Political offices
Preceded by Abdülhalik Renda	Minister of Finance of Turkey; 11 November 1927 – 25 December 1930	Succeeded by Abdülhalik Renda
Preceded by Tevfik Rüştü Aras	Minister of Foreign Affairs of Turkey; 11 November 1938 – 13 August 1942	Succeeded by Numan Menemencioğlu
Preceded by Refik Saydam	Prime Minister of Turkey; 9 July 1942 – 7 August 1946	Succeeded by Mehmet Recep Peker
Preceded by Ali Fuat Cebesoy	Speaker of the Parliament of Turkey; 1 November 1948 – 22 May 1950	Succeeded by Refik Koraltan
Honorary titles
Preceded by Hayri Celal Atamer	President of Fenerbahçe S.K. 1934–1950	Succeeded by Ali Muhittin Hacıbekir
