= Ministry of General Staff =

Former Ministry of Turkey

The Ministry of General Staff (Turkish: Erkan'ı Harbiye'i Umumiye Vekaleti) was a former government ministry in Turkey

The first government of pre-Republic Turkey which was called the 1st cabinet of the Executive Ministers of Turkey was founded on 3 May 1920 during when Turkey was in the Turkish War of Independence. The war ended by the Armistice of Mudanya on 11 October 1922. During this period the chief of general staff was a member of the government. Even after the war, during the peace negotiations at the Lausanne Conference and the proclamation of the Republic, the chief of general staff kept his seat in the cabinet. But on 3 March 1924 according to law no 429 the ministry was abolished (along with the Ministry of Sharia and the Foundations) and prime minister İsmet Pasha formed the 2nd government of Turkey without this ministry. The ministry existed during the five pre Republic governments and one Republican government.

== Ministers of General Staff ==
Name	Duration
İsmet Pasha	3 May 1920 – 3 August 1921
Fevzi Pasha	3 August 1921 – 6 March 1924
