= Second Group (Turkey) =

Parliamentary opposition in 1922–1923

Second Group (Turkish: İkinci Grup) was a short-term opposition in Turkish parliament in the 1922–23 term.

== Background ==
During the Turkish War of Independence, Mustafa Kemal Pasha (Atatürk) had the support of Turkish nationalists, though they were not a politically coherent group. Among them there were soldiers, civilian intellectuals, local land owners, and religious leaders. Towards the end of the war, the difference in political views became apparent. In particular, the future of post-war Turkey was a big question. One important issue was the political status of Atatürk, who was just promoted to the commander in chief of the military forces just before the Battle of Sakarya on 5 August 1921. Atatürk was authorised to exercise the power of the parliament.

== The group ==
The group was founded on 22 July 1922 during the discussion about the renewal of Atatürk's authorisation. They published their manifesto in the newspaper Tan which was owned by Ali Şükrü, an MP. They formed an opposition group of 63 MPs, and though did not have a leader, Hüseyin Avni (Ulaş), Ali Şükrü and Selahattin were among the notable speakers of the group. During the Congress of Lausanne they heavily criticized İsmet İnönü and the Turkish delegation. Although not a member of the group, they supported Rauf (later adopted the surname Orbay) during the election of the prime minister. (Before 1923 the government members were elected by the parliament one by one). The most important act of the group was a law proposal which aimed to end Atatürk's membership in the parliament on 25 November 1922. According to the proposal, in order to be an MP one had to live in the 1922s Turkey for the last 5 years. Atatürk being a soldier had spent most of his time in the battle fronts out of 1922s Turkey. In 1922 December, the proposal was rejected, but it showed the strength of the opposition.

== End of the group ==
Most of the group members lost their seats in the elections held on 3 July 1923, but Rauf Orbay kept his seat and in 1924 he was one of the founders of the Progressive Republican Party.
