= Ömer Lütfi Argeşo =

Turkish soldier

Ömer Lütfi Argeşo 1316-P. 25
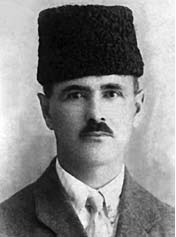
- Born: 1879; Constantinople (Istanbul), Ottoman Empire
- Died: 16 December 1942 (aged 62–63); Istanbul, Turkey
- Military career
- Allegiance: Ottoman Empire; Turkey
- Service years: Ottoman I: 2 February 1901 – May 18, 1914; Ottoman II: October 16, 1914–1919; Turkey: 1919–August 10, 1923
- Rank: Kaymakam
- Commands: 78th Regiment; 23rd Division, 18th Division
- Conflicts: First World War; Turkish War of Independence
- Other work: Member of the GNAT (Kara Hisar-i Sâhib)

Ömer Lütfi Argeşo or Ömer Lütfü Argeşo (1879; (Istanbul) - December 16, 1942; Istanbul) was an officer of the Ottoman Army and of the Turkish Army. He served in the 1st cabinet of the Executive Ministers of Turkey in 1920–21.

== Medals and decorations ==
- Gallipoli Star (Ottoman Empire)
- Silver Medal of Liyakat
- Prussia Iron Cross 2nd class
- Medal of Independence with Red Ribbon and Citation

== See also ==
- List of high-ranking commanders of the Turkish War of Independence
