= Abdülhalik Renda =

Turkish politician

Mustafa Abdülhalik Renda
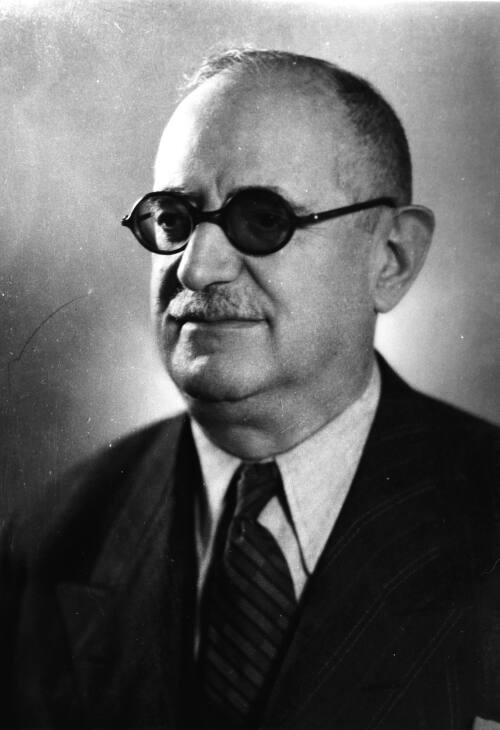

President of Turkey Acting
- In office 10 November 1938 – 11 November 1938
- Prime Minister: Celâl Bayar
- Preceded by: Mustafa Kemal Atatürk
- Succeeded by: İsmet İnönü

Speaker of the Grand National Assembly
- In office 1 March 1935 – 5 August 1946
- Preceded by: Kazım Özalp
- Succeeded by: Kazım Karabekir

Minister of Finance
- In office 25 December 1930 – 3 February 1934
- Prime Minister: İsmet İnönü
- Preceded by: Şükrü Saraçoğlu
- Succeeded by: Fuat Ağralı
- In office 3 July 1926 – 1 November 1927
- Prime Minister: İsmet İnönü
- Preceded by: Hasan Saka
- Succeeded by: Şükrü Saracoğlu
- In office 22 November 1924 – 3 March 1925
- Prime Minister: Fethi Okyar
- Preceded by: Recep Peker
- Succeeded by: Hasan Saka
- In office 2 January 1924 – 21 May 1924
- Prime Minister: İsmet İnönü
- Preceded by: Hasan Fehmi Ataç
- Succeeded by: Recep Peker

Minister of National Defense
- In office 1 November 1927 – 25 December 1930
- Preceded by: Recep Peker
- Succeeded by: Zekai Apaydın

Personal details
- Born: 29 November 1881 Yanya, Janina Vilayet, Ottoman Empire (modern Greece)
- Died: 1 October 1957 (aged 75) Erenköy, Istanbul, Turkey
- Cause of death: Heart attack
- Resting place: Cebeci Asri Cemetery, Ankara
- Education: Mekteb-i Mülkiye
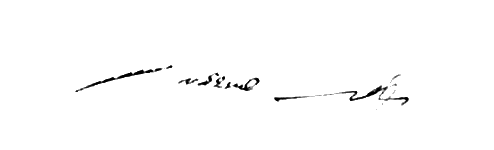
- Signature

Mustafa Abdülhalik Renda (29 November 1881 – 1 October 1957) was a Turkish civil servant and politician of Albanian descent who was acting President of Turkey for one day after Atatürk's death in November 1938.

== Biography ==
Renda was born in Yanya, in the Janina Vilayet of the Ottoman Empire (modern Greece). Renda was of Albanian origin. From 1902 to 1918, he served in several towns and cities of the Ottoman Empire as district governor and province governor. In 1918, he was exiled for six months to Malta. Following his return, he was appointed undersecretary in the Ministry of Economy and then in the Ministry of Interior. He became Governor of Konya, before he was appointed the first Governor of İzmir after the Turkish forces re-captured the city from withdrawing Greek troops. During Renda's tenure as İzmir governor, politician Rıza Nur accused him on grounds of compatriot solidarity of encouraging Albanians (refugees and immigrants) to resettle from other Anatolian regions to İzmir, claims that Renda denied.

From 1923 on, he was Deputy of Sivas for five consecutive terms. Mustafa Abdülhalik served as Minister of Finance and Minister of Defence in several cabinets from 1923 to 1935, and later from 1946 to 1948. After the Surname Law of 1934, which required all Turkish citizens to adopt a surname, he took on the surname "Renda". He was elected Speaker of the Grand National Assembly of Turkey on 1 March 1935, and served until 5 August 1946. During the early one-party period he emphasized on the need to Turkify the Kurds in the eastern provinces of Turkey.

Abdülhalik Renda died of a heart attack on 1 October 1957 in Erenköy, Istanbul. He was laid to rest at the Cebeci Asri Cemetery in Ankara.

== Armenian genocide ==
During the Armenian genocide Abdülhalik Renda was responsible for the deportations and murder of the Armenians of Bitlis Vilayet. He also organized the defense in the western mountain range against the Russian offensive in 1914, but to no avail, the Russians captured Saray as well as Başkale. In 1916, Renda became governor of Aleppo where he was instrumental in the deportations of Armenians to their deaths in Der Zor. Rossler, the German consul on Aleppo, was quoted as saying that Renda was "working with great energy for the destruction of Armenians". General Vehip Pasha, commander of the Third Army, mentioned that Renda in his testimony to the Mazhar Commission, claimed that he burned thousands of people alive in the province of Mush.

Political offices
Preceded by Hasan Fehmi (Ataç)	Minister of Finance; 1924	Succeeded by Recep Peker
Preceded by Recep Peker	Minister of Finance; 1924–1925	Succeeded by Hasan Saka
Preceded by Hasan Saka	Minister of Finance; 1926–1927	Succeeded by Şükrü Saraçoğlu
Preceded by Recep Peker	Minister of National Defense; 1927–1930	Succeeded by Zekai Apaydın
Preceded by Şükrü Saraçoğlu	Minister of Finance; 1930–1934	Succeeded by Fuat Ağralı
Preceded by Kazım Özalp	Speaker of the Parliament; 1935–1946	Succeeded by Kazım Karabekir
Preceded by Mustafa Kemal Atatürk	President of Turkey; Acting; 1938	Succeeded by İsmet İnönü
