= Hakkı Behiç Bayiç =

Turkish politician

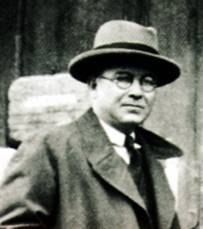

Member of the Grand National Assembly

Personal details
- Born: 1886 Constantinople, Ottoman Empire
- Died: October 12, 1943 (aged 56–57) Ankara, Turkey

Hakkı Behiç Bayiç (1886 – 12 October 1943) was a Turkish politician, who served as a secretary in the Turkish Communist Party founded by Atatürk.
