= Progressive Republican Party (Turkey) =

Political party in Turkey (1924–1925)

Progressive Republican Party Terakkiperver Cumhuriyet Fırkası
- President: Kâzım Karabekir
- Founder: Kâzım Karabekir
- Founded: 17 November 1924
- Banned: 5 June 1925
- Preceded by: Committee of Union and Progress (de facto)
- Headquarters: Ankara
- Ideology: Liberal conservatism Decentralization
- Political position: Right-wing
- Colours: Red

The Progressive Republican Party (Ottoman Turkish: ترقیپرور جمهوریت فرقه‌‌سی, romanized: Teraḳḳîperver Cumhûriyet Fırḳası) was a political party in Turkey between 1924 and 1925. It was established by Ali Fuat (Cebesoy) Pasha, Kâzım Karabekir, Refet (Bele) Pasha, Rauf (Orbay) Bey and Adnan (Adıvar) Bey on 17 November 1924. The party was banned on 5 June 1925 after the Sheikh Said rebellion.

== Background ==
Nearly one year before Greece and Turkey signed the Treaty of Lausanne in the summer of 1924, the Ottoman sultanate was abolished and the Turkish state was formally declared a republic, marking the end of six centuries of imperial rule. After the peace treaty was signed, Istanbul was relinquished to the ruling Turkish nationalists as the occupying armies withdrew at the close of the Turkish War of Independence. However, the domestic political conflict was not yet resolved and some established members of the Turkish National Movement including Ali Fuat Cebesoy, Kâzım Karabekir, Adnan Adıvar and Rauf Orbay were increasingly anxious that they would be targeted by Mustafa Kemal Atatürk, who had already forbidden the re-establishment of the Committee of Union and Progress (CUP) and abolished the Caliphate. In November 1924, a few months after the abolition of the Caliphate, members of the former CUP and National Movement joined to form the Progressive Republican Party in opposition to what they considered the authoritarian rule of Mustafa Kemal and the ruling Republican People's Party (CHP).

== Party leaders ==
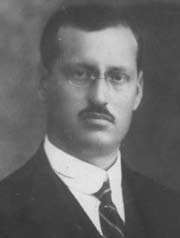
İsmail Canbulat (1880–1926)

The parties leaders consisted of the retired General Kâzım Karabekir who became its president, Adıvar and Orbay as his deputy presidents and several former members of the Committee for Union and Progress (CUP) such as Rüştü Pasha, Bekir Sami Kunduh, Ahmet Şükrü and İsmail Canbulat as members of the Central Administrative Committee.

== Policies ==
On domestic policy, the party supported liberalism generally, but was blamed by the government for being the vehicle of radicals in attempting subvert the newly established government. After Mustafa Kemal blamed Karabekir for the Sheikh Said Rebellion and the assassination attempt made on himself in İzmir, the party was closed on 5 June by the government. As a consequence, Karabekir and many members of the party were court-martialed by the Independence Tribunal and imprisoned, although they were later released. However, he was kept under house arrest along with 82 members of the opposition for two decades. During the presidency of İsmet İnönü, he was rehabilitated and chosen as a member of Parliament and was elected as the Speaker of the National Assembly after the end of World War II.

== See also ==
- Second Group (Turkey)
