= Recep Peker =

6th Prime Minister of the Republic of Turkey from 1946 to 1947

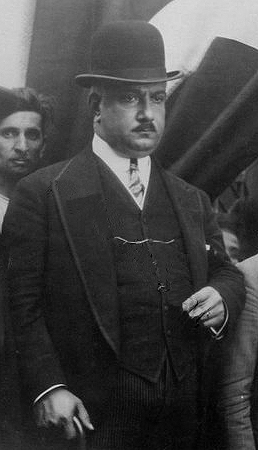

6th Prime Minister of Turkey
- In office 7 August 1946 – 10 September 1947
- President: İsmet İnönü
- Preceded by: Şükrü Saracoğlu
- Succeeded by: Hasan Saka

Minister of the Interior
- In office 17 August 1942 – 20 May 1943
- Prime Minister: Şükrü Saracoğlu
- Preceded by: Ahmet Fikri Tüzer
- Succeeded by: Hilmi Uran
- In office 21 May 1924 – 5 January 1925
- Prime Minister: Fethi Okyar
- Preceded by: Ahmet Ferit Tek
- Succeeded by: Mehmet Cemil Uybadın

Minister of National Education
- In office 7 April 1929 – 10 April 1929
- Prime Minister: İsmet İnönü
- Preceded by: Hüseyin Vasıf Çınar
- Succeeded by: Cemal Hüsnü Taray

Minister of Public Works
- In office 15 October 1928 – 27 September 1930
- Prime Minister: İsmet İnönü
- Preceded by: Behiç Erkin
- Succeeded by: Zekai Apaydın

Minister of National Defense
- In office 4 March 1925 – 1 November 1927
- Prime Minister: İsmet İnönü
- Preceded by: Fethi Okyar
- Succeeded by: Abdülhalik Renda

Minister of Finance
- In office 21 May 1924 – 22 November 1924
- Prime Minister: İsmet İnönü
- Preceded by: Abdülhalik Renda
- Succeeded by: Abdülhalik Renda

Member of the Grand National Assembly
- In office 28 June 1923 – 1 April 1950
- Constituency: Kütahya (1923, 1927, 1931, 1935, 1939, 1943, 1946)

Personal details
- Born: Mehmet Recep; 5 February 1889 Istanbul, Ottoman Empire
- Died: 1 April 1950 (aged 61) Istanbul, Turkey
- Resting place: Edirnekapı Martyr's Cemetery, Istanbul
- Party: Republican People's Party (CHP)
- Education: Ottoman Military Academy; Ottoman Military College
- Occupation: Army officer, politician

Mehmet Recep Peker (Turkish pronunciation: [mehˈmet ɾeˈdʒep peˈcæɾ]; 5 February 1889 – 1 April 1950) was a Turkish military officer and politician. A heavy-handed modernist, he served in various ministerial posts and finally as the Prime Minister of Turkey between 1946 and 1947.

== Early life ==
Born in Istanbul on 5 February 1889, his father was named Mustafa and was of Lezgi descent, migrated to Anatolia from the Dagestan region of the Caucasus.

He studied at the Military College following his graduation from the Kuleli Military High School, where he enrolled after completing his primary and secondary education at Koca Mustafa Pasha Primary School and Military Middle School. After finishing the academy in the rank of a lieutenant in 1907, he was assigned to the staff officer class.

Recep Peker took part at the battles of Yemen and Libya, Balkan Wars, Thrace and Caucasus campaigns of the World War I. He graduated in 1919, as the first of his class, from the Staff College to which he entered in 1911.

At the second half of 1919, he served as assistant teacher of history of war at the Military Academy. He joined the Turkish War of Independence in Anatolia as a squadron leader on the 4th of February 1920.

== Politics ==
He was appointed secretary general of the Grand National Assembly of Turkey on 23 April 1920, the day the parliament was opened. He served in this position more than three years.

In the time between his appointment as the parliament's secretary general until the Battle of Sakarya, he served in addition as the chief of Second Branch Office at the General Staff. On 12 July 1923, he was re-elected into the parliament as the deputy from Kütahya.

He was the Minister of Finance between 6 March and 22 November 1924, and Minister of Interior and on commission the Minister of Barter and Minister of Development and Housing. Peker was appointed as the Minister of National Defence on 4 March 1925 when İsmet İnönü formed a new government, and the Minister of Public Works in 1927. He was elected the parliamentary group spokesman and secretary general of the Republican People's Party (CHP) in 1928.

Recep Peker initiated the introduction of the "History of the Revolution" in the school curricula. He taught Republican Ideology at universities in Ankara and Istanbul in the academic year 1933-1934. His classes were known as revolution lessons (İnkılap Dersleri). He wrote a book about it. He supported the idea that women should be liberated from the sack (the veil) and that the Arabic alphabet should be replaced by a Latin based alphabet.

In 1936, he was sent to Italy to study fascist institutions. When he returned, Peker wrote a report suggesting that there should be a "Fascist Council" within the Grand National Assembly of Turkey, similar to the Italian Grand Council of Fascism. While this suggestion was initially accepted by Prime Minister İsmet İnönü, it was refused by Mustafa Kemal Atatürk, who subsequently dismissed Peker as the general secretary of CHP.

On 17 August 1942, he was appointed Minister of Interior in the cabinet of Şükrü Saracoğlu serving nine months. Recep Peker became the first prime minister of the multi-party period on 7 August 1946, however Peker was a strong advocate of statism and the authoritarian one-party state. As prime minister, he opposed democratization and the introduction of the multi-party system. He served in this position until 7 September 1947. In 1948, he retired from political life.

Recep Peker died on 2 April 1950, and was laid to rest at the Edirnekapı Martyr's Cemetery in Istanbul.

Political offices
Preceded by Şükrü Saraçoğlu	Prime Minister of Turkey; 7 August 1946 – 10 September 1947	Succeeded by Hasan Saka
Preceded by Ahmet Fikri Tüzer	Minister of the Interior; 17 August 1942 – 20 May 1943	Succeeded by Hilmi Uran
Preceded by Hüseyin Vasıf Çınar	Minister of National Education; 7 April 1929 – 10 April 1929	Succeeded by Cemal Hüsnü Taray
Preceded by Behiç Erkin	Minister of Public Works; 15 October 1928 – 27 September 1930	Succeeded by Zekai Apaydın
Preceded by Fethi Okyar	Minister of National Defense; 4 March 1925 – 1 November 1927	Succeeded by Abdülhalik Renda
Preceded by Ahmet Ferit Tek	Minister of the Interior; 21 May 1924 – 5 January 1925	Succeeded by Cemil Uybadın
Preceded by Abdülhalik Renda	Minister of Finance; 21 May 1924 – 22 November 1924	Succeeded by Abdülhalik Renda
