= Ministry of Sharia and the Foundations =

Former ministry of Turkey

Ministry of Sharia and the Foundations (Turkish: Şerriye ve Evkaf Vekaleti) was a former government ministry in the Ottoman Empire and the early history of the Republic of Turkey. The ministry was the highest religious authority and was responsible for the waqfs (inalienable charitable endowments under Islamic law).

== History ==
The ministry was established during the Ottoman era. During the early days of the Turkish Republic, it was also a ministry of Turkey. In all five governments before the Republic and the 1st government of Turkey after the proclamation of the Republic there was always a seat of the Ministry of Sharia and the Foundations in the government.

However, on 3 March 1924, by the law no. 429, it was abolished. Instead, two general directorates were established under the Prime Minister of Turkey: the "Directorate of Religious Affairs" (Turkish: Diyanet İşleri Başkanlığı) and the "General Directorate of the Foundations" (Turkish: Vakıflar Genel Müdürlüğü) to take on the responsibilities of the former ministry.

Up to the enactment of this law, the responsibility of education system, which was partially managed by this ministry and partially by the Ministry of National Education was totally put under the responsibility of the Ministry of National Education. This disestablishment marked the end of the 1st government of Turkey. On 6 March 1924, Prime Minister İsmet Pasha formed the 2nd government of Turkey, this time without the Ministry of Sharia and the Foundations.

== Ministers ==
Name	Duration
Mustafa Fehmi	3 May 1920 – 27 April 1922
Abdullah Azmi	27 April 1922 – 26 October 1922
Mehmet Vehbi	26 October 1922 – 14 August 1923
Musa Kazım	14 August 1923 – 24 September 1923
Mustafa Fevzi	24 September 1923 – 6 March 1924
