= Hasan Saka =

7th Prime Minister of the Republic of Turkey from 1947 to 1949

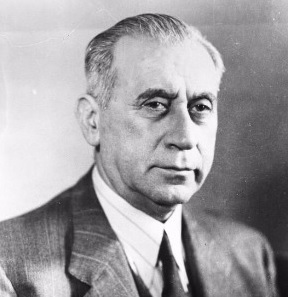

7th Prime Minister of Turkey
- In office 10 September 1947 – 16 January 1949
- President: İsmet İnönü
- Preceded by: Recep Peker
- Succeeded by: Şemsettin Günaltay

Member of the Grand National Assembly
- In office 28 June 1923 – 2 May 1954
- Constituency: Trabzon (1923, 1927, 1931, 1935, 1939, 1943, 1946, 1950)

Personal details
- Born: 1885 Trabzon, Ottoman Empire
- Died: 29 July 1960 (aged 74–75) Istanbul, Turkey
- Party: Republican People's Party
- Education: Mekteb-i Mülkiye; Sciences Po Paris

Hasan Hüsnü Saka (1885 – 29 July 1960) was a Turkish politician, minister of foreign affairs, and prime minister of Turkey.

== Political career ==
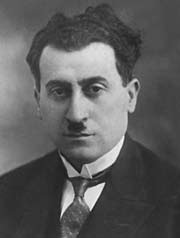
Hasan Saka in the 1920s

He graduated from Mekteb-i Mülkiye (English: School of Civil Service) in 1908. Hasan Saka started working for government in "Divan-ı Muhasebat" (Council of Accounts). He was sent to France for further education by the Ottoman government in 1909. After graduating from the School of Political Science with a diplomacy major, he returned home to continue his prior job.

He was elected as a member of the Ottoman Parliament in Istanbul at its last term and kept his position until the parliament was closed. He was elected as a member of Grand National Assembly of Turkey from Trabzon at its first term on 28 January 1921. He was a member of the Turkish delegation at the Lausanne Conference.

Saka was appointed minister of foreign affairs on 13 September 1944. He quit this position on 9 September 1947 when the entire cabinet resigned.

He was appointed prime minister on 10 September 1947. He formed his second cabinet on 10 June 1948. He resigned from office on 9 September 1949 but continued to be a member of parliament. His political life ended in 1954 when he decided not to run for the parliament again.

He died on 29 July 1960 in Istanbul, and was laid to rest at the Zincirlikuyu Cemetery.

Political offices
Preceded by Abdülhalik Renda	Minister of Finance; 3 March 1925 – 13 July 1926	Succeeded by Abdülhalik Renda
Preceded by Numan Menemencioğlu	Minister of Foreign Affairs; 13 September 1944 – 10 September 1947	Succeeded by Necmettin Sadak
Preceded by Münir Birsel	Minister of National Defense (acting); 5 June 1948 – 10 June 1948	Succeeded by Hüseyin Hüsnü Çakır
Preceded by Mehmet Recep Peker	Prime Minister of Turkey; 10 September 1947 – 16 January 1949	Succeeded by Şemsettin Günaltay
