= Rauf Orbay =

Turkish naval officer and diplomat (1881–1964)

Hüseyin Rauf Orbay Pasha
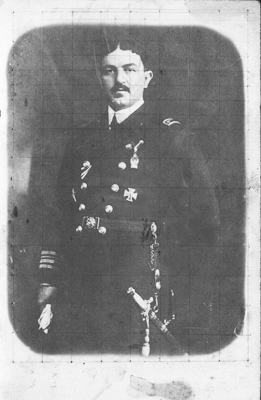

3rd Prime Minister of the Government of the Grand National Assembly
- In office 12 July 1922 – 4 August 1923
- Preceded by: Fevzi Çakmak
- Succeeded by: Fethi Okyar

Personal details
- Born: Mehmed Muzzafer oğlu Hüseyin Rauf; 27 July 1881 Istanbul, Ottoman Empire
- Died: 16 July 1964 (aged 82) Istanbul, Turkey
- Party: Progressive Republican Party (1923–1924)
- Education: Turkish Naval Academy
- Awards: Medal of Independence
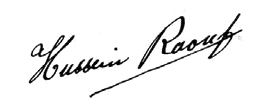
- Signature
- Nickname: Hero of Hamidiye

Military service
- Allegiance: Ottoman Empire
- Branch/service: Ottoman Navy
- Years of service: 1895–1918
- Rank: Colonel
- Commands: Ottoman cruiser Hamidiye
- Battles/wars: Balkan Wars; World War I

Hüseyin Rauf Orbay (27 July 1881 – 16 July 1964) was a Turkish naval officer, statesman and diplomat of Abkhaz origin. During the Italo–Turkish and Balkan Wars he was known as the Hero of Hamidiye for his exploits as captain of the eponymous cruiser. Orbay briefly served as Minister of Navy in October 1918, and signed the Armistice of Mudros on behalf of the Ottoman Empire.

He played an important role in the Turkish War of Independence, during which he served as the prime minister of the Ankara government between 12 July 1922 and 4 August 1923.

During the Republican period he was one of the founders of the Progressive Republican Party. He was put on trial for his involvement in an alleged assassination attempt against Mustafa Kemal Atatürk and sentenced to ten years in prison. Orbay was rehabilitated in 1939 and served as an MP for Kastamonu and then ambassador to London.

== Early life ==
Hüseyin Rauf (Orbay after 1934) was born in the Cibali district of Fatih, Constantinople, in 1881 to an Abkhazian family. His father was Mehmet Muzaffer Pasha, a high ranking admiral and later member of the Ottoman Senate. His mother was Hayriye Rüveyde Hanım, daughter of Emin Efendi, the Director of the Tahrirat. They had five children from this marriage, two sons and three daughters, one of whom was Rauf.

Due to his father's duty, he completed his secondary education at the Tripoli Military Rüştiye and then returned to Istanbul. He graduated from the Heybeliada Naval School in 1899 and joined the navy.

== Military career ==
Rauf Orbay began his military career with the rank of deck engineer [Güverte mühendisi]. He was promoted to first lieutenant in 1901 and then captain in 1904. He was assigned to the Mesudiye in 1904. Between 1905 and 1911, he visited the United States, the United Kingdom, and Germany, with duties such ordering ships and inspecting shipbuilding yards. He was promoted to kolağası (senior captain) in 1907. He participated in the Action Army that came to Istanbul due to the March 31 Uprising as the sağkolağası. There he met Mustafa Kemal (Atatürk) and İsmet (İnönü).

On May 25, 1909, he was appointed commanding officer of the cruiser Hamidiye and played a role in the suppression of the Albanian Uprising. In the 1911–1912 Italo–Turkish War, he took part in a supply mission to Tripoli in Libya.

As an officer in the Ottoman Navy, he achieved fame for his exploits as captain of the Hamidiye during the First Balkan War. The ship broke through the Greek blockade of the Dardanelles and sailed into the Mediterranean, whereupon it became the first cruiser to carry out commerce raiding operations in history. For almost 8 months, the Hamidiye harassed and sank merchant ships of the Balkan League throughout the Mediterranean and Red Sea. These operations captured the media's attention, providing a propaganda coup and moral for the Ottoman Empire. Rauf Bey came to be known as the "Hero of Hamidiye" [Hamidiye Kahramanı]. The state created a new medal just for the cruiser's crew.

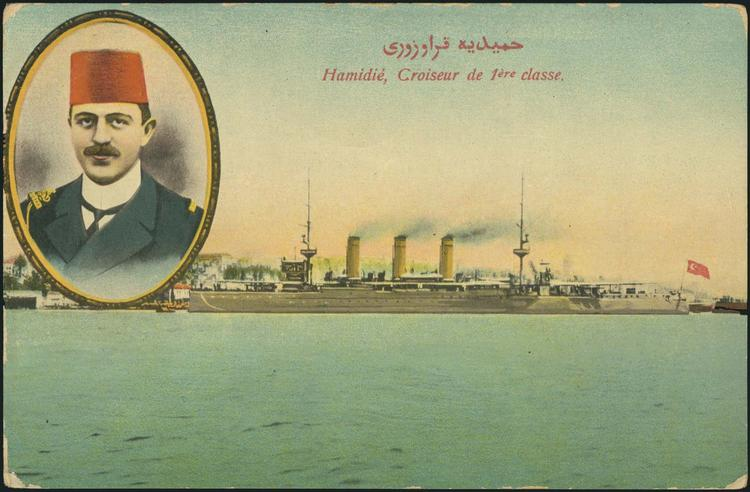
Rauf Orbay as the captain of the cruiser Hamidiye

== World War I ==
During World War I, he was an officer of the Special Organization, undertaking operations in Iran and Mesopotamia. Returning to Istanbul from Kirkuk he was appointed Chief of the Naval Staff, where he led Ottoman marine forces during the Gallipoli campaign. In 1917, he visited German Emperor Wilhelm II together with Naval Minister Cemal Pasha. He represented the Ottoman Empire as the Naval Forces delegate at the Brest-Litovsk Peace Conference. Rauf Orbay also played a role in saving Mustafa Kemal (Atatürk) from a near court-martial during a feud with Cemal and Enver Pasha.

With the fall of the Talat Pasha government Orbay was made Minister of the Navy in Ahmet Izzet Pasha's cabinet. He led delegation that signed the Armistice of Mudros which ended the Ottoman Empire's participation in World War I. After a correspondence with his counterpart: Admiral Somerset Arthur Gough-Calthorpe, he claimed he had assurances that no Allied soldiers would be entering Istanbul or Adana, and that there would be no occupation of Ottoman territory.

The independence of our state, the rights of our sultanate have been preserved in their entirety. This is not an armistice concluded between victor and vanquished; rather it is more a situation in which two equal powers, both desiring to end a state of war, cease hostilities.

On November 13 Allied soldiers landed in Constantinople to begin a partial occupation of the city, as well as take advantage of Article VII to occupy more parts of the Ottoman Empire.

== War of Independence ==
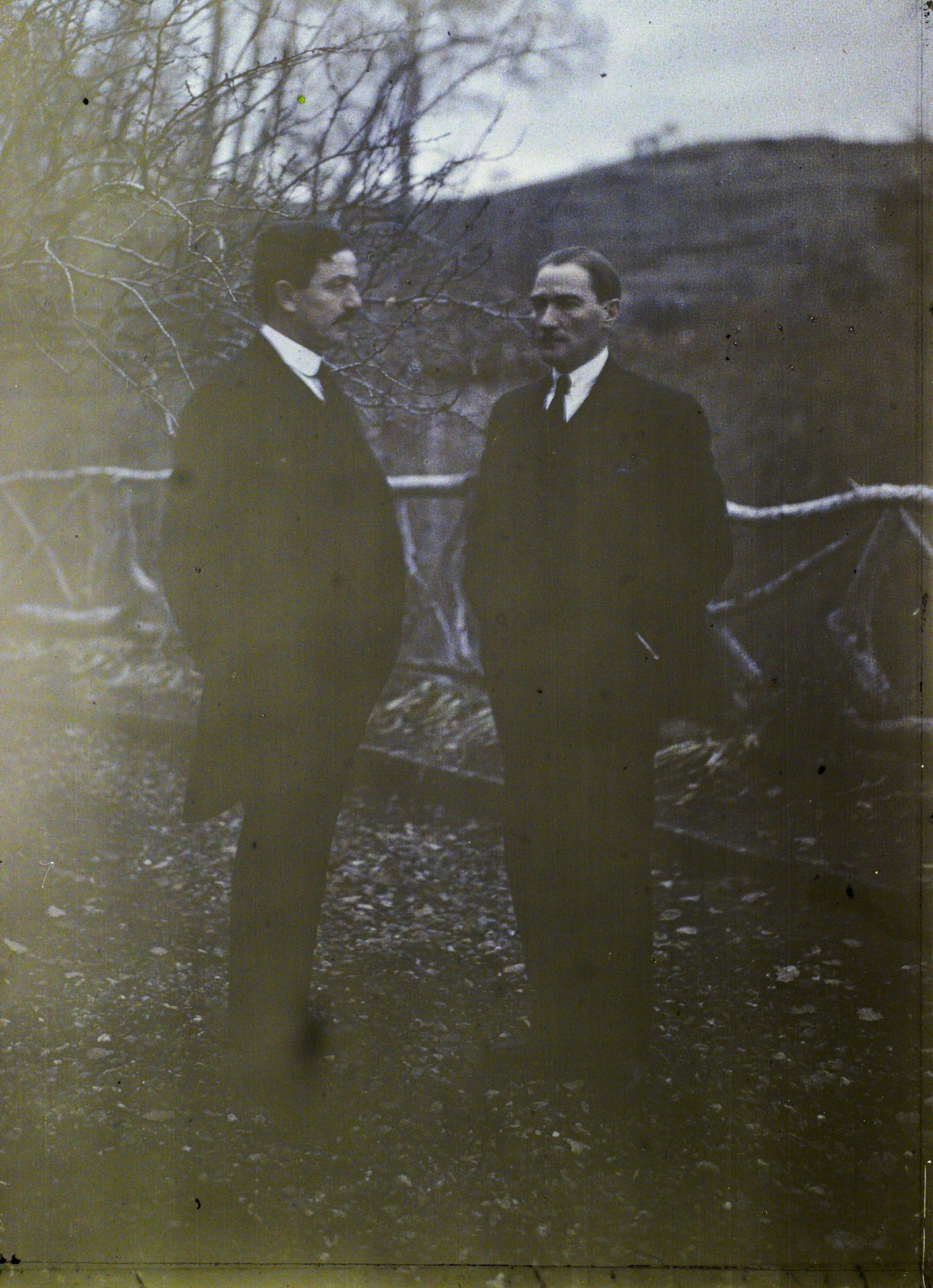
Hüseyin Rauf Orbay and Mustafa Kemal Atatürk in Ankara, 1922 autochrome by Frédéric Gadmer

Rauf Bey quickly left Istanbul for Anatolia to organize nationalist resistance to the Allied powers. One of the first things he did leaving the capital was to organize Circassian militias on the Anatolian Marmara coast, his ethnicity being a helpful asset. On 8 June 1919 he arrived in Ankara. From there he met Ali Fuat Pasha (Cebesoy) and Mustafa Kemal Pasha (Atatürk) in Amasya. There they issued the Amasya Circular on 22 June 1919.

He was elected as a member of the Representative Committee in the Congress of Erzurum on 23 July 1919. He joined the Congress of Sivas as a delegate for Sivas on 4 September 1919 and was elected deputy chairman. He was then elected as a deputy for the Chamber of Deputies in the 1919 Ottoman general election, on behalf of the Representative Committee. During this time, tension flared between him and Atatürk. Himself and many nationalists went to Istanbul to take their seats in the new parliament, while Atatürk stayed behind, suspicious of the allied presence in the capital. Rauf formed the National Salvation Group [Felah-ı Vatan] in the Assembly. However The Allies decided to formally occupy the Istanbul. Rauf Bey was arrested by British forces when they raided the Ottoman parliament on 16 March 1920, and was exiled to Malta soon after. After being held captive in Malta for 20 months, Rauf Bey was let go after a prisoner swap in İnebolu, his equivalent being Major Rawlinson. Rauf finally arrived to Ankara on 15 November 1921, joining the Grand National Assembly representing Sivas.

He was appointed Minister of Public Works and the Vice President of the Assembly, and he remained in these positions until 14 January 1922. He soon associated himself with the Second Group, which opposed Mustafa Kemal's leadership of the nationalist movement. As a result of the lobbying of Fevzi Pasha (Çakmak), before the Battle of Dumlupınar he became the Prime Minister of the Ankara Government. During the Lausanne Peace Conference which was inaugurated after the Turkish victory in the war of independence, he was acting Minister of National Defense and Foreign Affairs from İsmet Pasha (İnönü). He refusal to authorize İsmet to sign the treaty caused a rift between the two statesmen. Kemal gave İsmet the necessary authority to sign anyways, and Rauf resigned from the premiership on 14 August 1923.

== Career in the Republic ==
By 1924 he was aligned with the new opposition to Mustafa Kemal: the Progressive Republican Party. The party was closed in 1925, and its leadership were tried in connection with the Izmir Plot in 1926. Orbay's property was seized, his civil rights suspended, and sentenced ten years in prison, however he was in Vienna for medical treatment at the time, so he never followed through this sentence. He denied the allegations of his involvement in the plot and the verdict against him, but without ways to appeal the decision, he was a political refugee. While abroad, he visited the United Kingdom, India, China and Egypt. He refused to return following an amnesty law in 1933, saying "...since I have never committed even the slightest crime, it is not possible for me to consider benefiting from the declared amnesty like murderers and bandits." After his brother-in-law died in 1935, he returned to the country at the insistence of his family, and eventually settled his conviction with a lawsuit against the Ministry of Defence in 1941. He entered politics again and was elected as an independent deputy from Kastamonu in 1939.

During World War II, Rauf Orbay was the Turkish ambassador in London, resigning in 1944. He ran as an independent candidate for Istanbul in the 1949 by-elections but was unsuccessful. He spent the rest of his life giving lectures and conferences at universities and traveling. He died of a heart attack in Istanbul in 1964. His grave is in the Sahrayıcedit Cemetery in Erenköy. His memoirs were posthumously published under the title Cehennem Değirmeni ("Windmill of Hell").

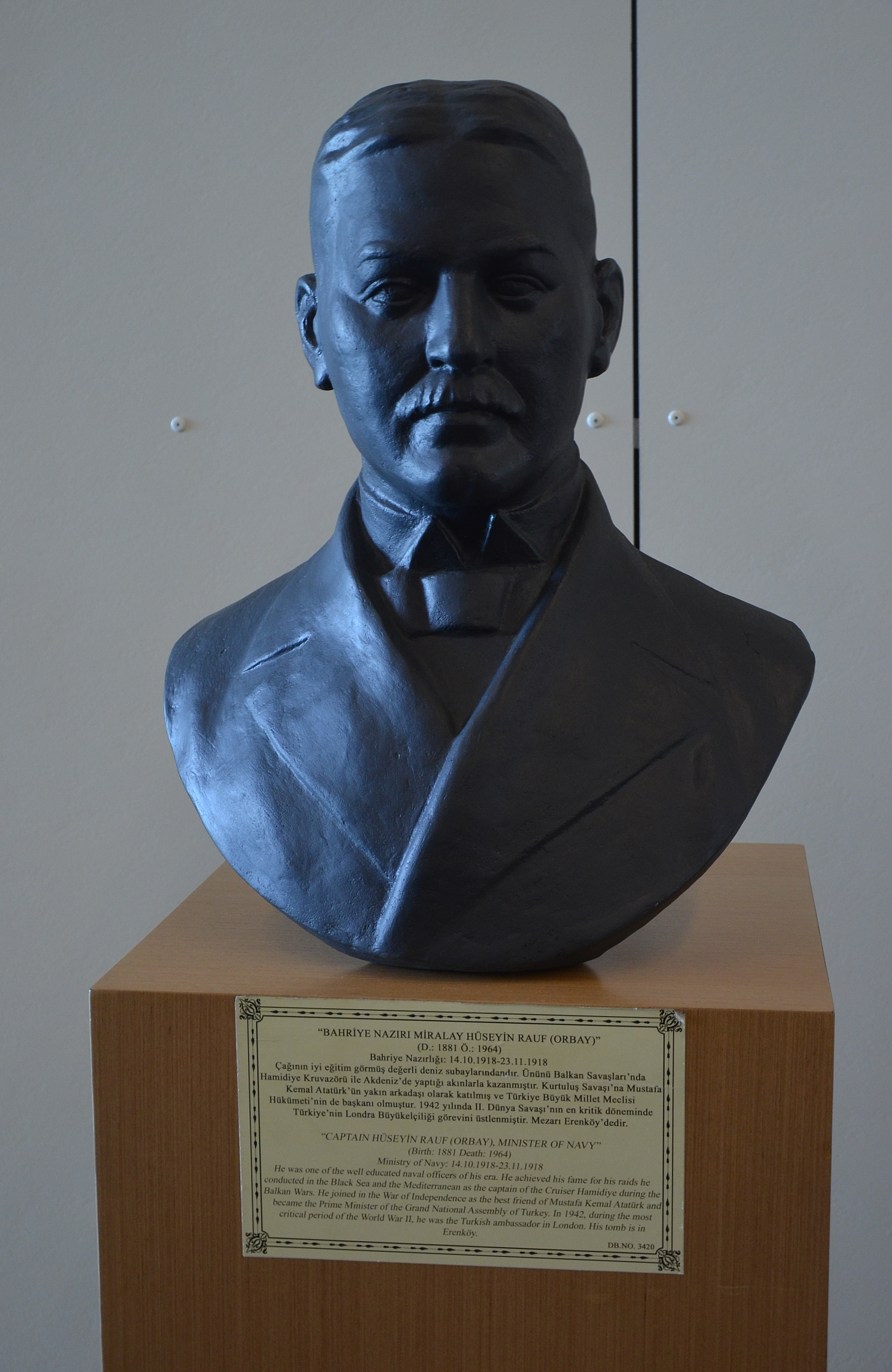
Bust of Rauf Orbay in the Istanbul Naval Museum

Political offices
Preceded by Fevzi Çakmak	Prime Minister of Turkey; 12 July 1922 – 4 August 1923	Succeeded by Fethi Okyar
