= List of ministers of transport and infrastructure of Turkey =

The following is a list of ministers of transport and infrastructure of Turkey. The post was established in 1939, with Ali Çetinkaya as the first office holder. As of 2017, the office holder is Ahmet Arslan and the office has been held by 64 people.

== List of ministers ==
No.	Name (birth–death)	Term of office		Political party	No of. government
Ministers of Transport (3 April 1939 – 1 November 2011)
1	Ali Çetinkaya (1878–1949)	3 April 1939	20 November 1940	Republican People's Party	12
2	Cevdet Kerim İncedayı (1893–1951)	20 November 1940	12 November 1941	Republican People's Party	12
3	Mehmet Fahri Engin (1888–1970)	12 November 1941	9 March 1943	Republican People's Party	12- 13
4	Ali Fuat Cebesoy (1882-1962)	9 March 1943	7 August 1946	Republican People's Party	14
5	Şükrü Koçak (1886-1961)	7 August 1946	10 June 1948	Republican People's Party	15- 16
6	Kasım Gülek (1905-1996)	10 June 1948	16 January 1949	Republican People's Party	17
7	Kemal Satır (1911-1991)	16 January 1949	22 May 1950	Republican People's Party	18
8	Ahmet Tevfik İleri (1911-1961)	22 May 1950	11 August 1950	Democrat Party	19
9	Seyfi Kurtbek (1905-1995)	11 August 1950	10 November 1952	Democrat Party	19- 20
10	Yümnü Üresin (1898-1961)	10 November 1952	17 May 1954	Democrat Party	20
11	Muammer Çavuşoğlu (1903-1972)	17 May 1954	9 December 1955	Democrat Party	21
12	Arif Demirer (1909-1997)	9 December 1955	25 November 1957	Democrat Party	22
13	Fevzi Uçaner (1900-1963)	25 November 1957	18 September 1958	Democrat Party	23
14	Muzaffer Kurbanoğlu (1913-2006)	1 November 1958	9 December 1959	Democrat Party	23
15	Şemi Ergin (1913-1996)	9 December 1959	27 May 1960	Democrat Party	23
16	Sıtkı Ulay (1907-1997)	30 May 1960	5 January 1961	Military	24
17	Mehmet Orhan Mersinli (1912-1975)	5 January 1961	20 November 1961	Military	25
18	Mustafa Cahit Akyar (1910-1988)	20 November 1961	25 June 1962	Justice Party	26
19	Rıfat Öçten (1913-1970)	25 June 1962	10 June 1963	New Turkey Party	27
20	İhsan Şeref Dura (1901-1984)	13 June 1963	25 December 1963	New Turkey Party	27
21	Abdurrahman Ferit Alpiskender (1908-1989)	25 December 1963	15 December 1964	Justice Party	28
22	Mahmut Vural (1926-2002)	15 December 1964	20 February 1965	Republican People's Party	28
23	Mithat San (1926-1994)	20 February 1965	31 July 1965	Justice Party	29
24	Kazım Yurdakul (1916-1983)	31 July 1965	27 October 1965	Justice Party	29
25	Seyfi Öztürk (1927-2002)	27 October 1965	3 April 1967	Justice Party	30
26	Mehmet Saadettin Bilgiç (1920-2012)	3 April 1967	1 August 1969	Justice Party	30
27	Mehmet İzmen (1909-1986)	1 August 1969	3 November 1969	Justice Party	30
28	Nahit Menteşe (1932- )	3 November 1969	14 December 1970	Justice Party	31- 32
29	Mehmet Orhan Tuğrul (1916-2006)	14 December 1970	26 March 1971	Justice Party	32
30	Haluk Arık (1917-2022)	26 March 1971	29 September 1971	Independent	33
31	Selahattin Babüroğlu (1923-2021)	29 September 1971	27 October 1971	Independent	33
32	Cahit Karakaş (1928- )	27 October 1971	11 December 1971	Justice Party	33
33	Rıfkı Danışman (1924-2018)	11 December 1971	15 April 1973	Justice Party	34- 35
34	Ahmet Sabahattin Özbek (1915-2001)	15 April 1973	26 January 1974	Justice Party	36
35	Hasan Ferda Güley (1916-2008)	26 January 1974	17 November 1974	Republican People's Party	37
(34)	Ahmet Sabahattin Özbek (1915-2001)	17 November 1974	31 March 1975	Justice Party	38
(28)	Nahit Menteşe (1932- )	31 March 1975	11 April 1977	Justice Party	39
36	İbrahim Aysoy (1931-2024)	17 April 1977	21 June 1977	Justice Party	39
37	Erol Çevikçe (1937- )	21 June 1977	21 July 1977	Republican People's Party	40
38	Yılmaz Ergenekon (1929-1983)	21 July 1977	5 January 1978	Justice Party	41
39	Güneş Öngüt (1933-1992)	5 January 1978	12 November 1979	Republican People's Party	42
40	Hüseyin Özalp (1923-2014)	12 November 1979	12 September 1980	Justice Party	43
41	Necmi Özgür (1917-1989)	12 September 1980	2 March 1983	Military	44
42	Mustafa Aydın Aysan (1933-2024)	2 March 1983	13 December 1983	Military	44
43	Veysel Atasoy (1947-2004 )	13 December 1983	16 September 1987	Motherland Party	45
44	İhsan Pekel (1930-2019)	16 September 1987	21 December 1987	Motherland Party	45
45	Ekrem Pakdemirli (1939-2015 )	21 December 1987	30 March 1989	Motherland Party	46
46	Cengiz Tuncer (1942-1992 )	30 March 1989	23 June 1991	Motherland Party	46- 47
47	İbrahim Özdemir (1949- )	21 June 1991	21 August 1991	Motherland Party	48
48	Sabahattin Yalınpala (1926-2012)	21 August 1991	20 November 1991	Motherland Party	48
49	Yaşar Topçu (1941- )	20 November 1991	25 June 1993	True Path Party	49
50	Mehmet Köstepen (1947-2004)	25 June 1993	12 April 1995	True Path Party	50
51	Ali Şevki Erek (1935- )	29 May 1995	31 October 1995	True Path Party	51 -52
51	Oğuz Tezmen (1948- )	31 October 1995	6 March 1996	Independent	52
52	Ömer Barutçu (1942-2024)	6 March 1996	30 July 1997	True Path Party	53- 54
53	Necdet Menzir (1945-2013)	30 July 1997	4 August 1998	True Path Party	55
54	Arif Ahmet Denizolgun (1955-2016)	4 August 1998	11 January 1999	Welfare Party	55
55	Hasan Basri Aktan (1952- )	11 January 1999	28 May 1999	Independent	56
56	Enis Öksüz (1946- )	28 May 1999	17 July 2001	Nationalist Movement Party	57
57	Oktay Vural (1956- )	30 July 2001	5 August 2002	Nationalist Movement Party	57
58	Naci Kınacıoğlu (1929-2009)	5 August 2002	18 November 2002	Independent	57
59	Binali Yıldırım (1955- )	18 November 2002	8 May 2007	Justice and Development Party	58 -59
60	İsmet Yılmaz (1961- )	8 May 2007	29 August 2007	Independent	59
(59)	Binali Yıldırım (1955- )	29 August 2007	8 March 2011	Justice and Development Party	60
61	Habip Soluk (1950- )	8 March 2011	6 July 2011	Independent	60
(59)	Binali Yıldırım (1955- )	6 July 2011	1 November 2011	Justice and Development Party	61
Ministers of Transport, Maritime Affairs and Communication (1 November 2011 – 10 July 2018)
1	Binali Yıldırım (1955- )	1 November 2011	25 December 2013	Justice and Development Party	61
2	Lütfi Elvan (1962- )	25 December 2013	6 March 2015	Justice and Development Party	61- 62
3	Feridun Bilgin (1964- )	6 March 2015	24 November 2015	Independent	62- 63
(1)	Binali Yıldırım (1955- )	24 November 2015	24 May 2016	Justice and Development Party	64
4	Ahmet Arslan (1962- )	24 May 2016	10 July 2018	Justice and Development Party	65
Ministers of Transport and Infrastructure (10 July 2018 – Present)
5	Mehmet Cahit Turan (1960- )	10 July 2018	28 March 2020	Independent	66
6	Adil Karaismailoğlu (1969- )	28 March 2020	4 June 2023	Justice and Development Party	66
7	Abdulkadir Uraloğlu (1966- )	4 June 2023	Incumbent	Justice and Development Party	67
