= List of prime ministers of Turkey =

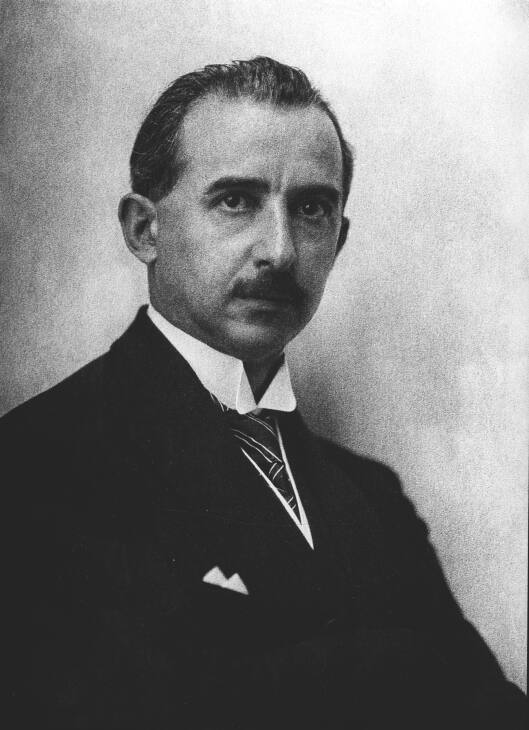
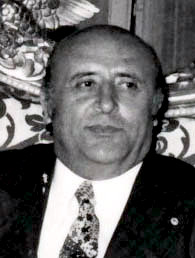
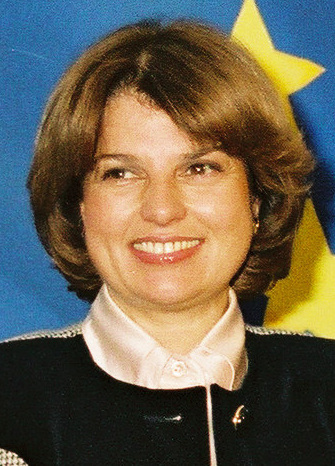
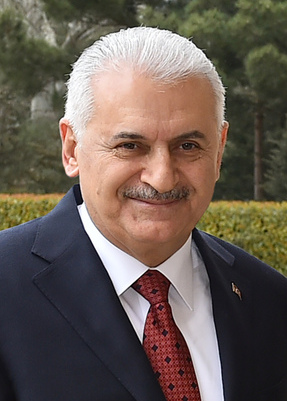
- Top left: İsmet İnönü was Turkey's first prime minister and the longest serving prime minister.
- Top right: Süleyman Demirel was the prime minister who formed the most governments in Turkey.
- Bottom left: Tansu Çiller was Turkey's first and only female Prime Minister.
- Bottom right: Binali Yıldırım was Turkey's last prime minister.

The position of Prime Minister of Turkey was established in 1920, during the Turkish War of Independence. The prime minister was the head of the executive branch of the government along with the Cabinet. Following the 2017 constitutional referendum, the office of prime minister was abolished and the President became the head of the executive branch after the 2018 general election.

For a list of grand viziers of the predecessor Ottoman Empire, see List of Ottoman grand viziers.

== List of prime ministers (1920–2018) ==
=== Heads of the Government of the Grand National Assembly (1920–1923) ===
No.	Portrait	Name (Birth–Death)	Election (Parliament)	Term of office			Political party	Cabinet	Speaker (Term)
No.	Portrait	Name (Birth–Death)	Election (Parliament)	Took office	Left office	Time in office	Political party	Cabinet	Speaker (Term)
1		Mustafa Kemal Atatürk (1881–1938)	1920 (1st)	3 May 1920	24 January 1921	266 days	Association for Defence of National Rights	Atatürk	Mustafa Kemal Atatürk (1920–1923)
2		Fevzi Çakmak (1876–1950)	1920 (1st)	24 January 1921	9 July 1922	1 year, 166 days	Association for Defence of National Rights	Çakmak I	Mustafa Kemal Atatürk (1920–1923)
2		Fevzi Çakmak (1876–1950)	1920 (1st)	24 January 1921	9 July 1922	1 year, 166 days	Association for Defence of National Rights	Çakmak II	Mustafa Kemal Atatürk (1920–1923)
3		Rauf Orbay (1881–1964)	1920 (1st)	12 July 1922	4 August 1923	1 year, 23 days	Association for Defence of National Rights	Orbay	Mustafa Kemal Atatürk (1920–1923)
4		Fethi Okyar (1880–1943)	1920 (1st)	14 August 1923	27 October 1923	74 days	Association for Defence of National Rights	Okyar	Mustafa Kemal Atatürk (1920–1923)

=== Prime Ministers of the Republic of Turkey (1923–2018) ===
Status

Denotes acting prime minister

No.	Portrait	Name (Birth–Death)	Election (Parliament)	Term of office			Political party	Cabinet	President (Term)
No.	Portrait	Name (Birth–Death)	Election (Parliament)	Took office	Left office	Time in office	Political party	Cabinet	President (Term)
1		İsmet İnönü (1884–1973)	1923 (2nd)	30 October 1923	22 November 1924	1 year, 23 days	Republican People's Party	İnönü I	Mustafa Kemal Atatürk (1923–1938)
1		İsmet İnönü (1884–1973)	1923 (2nd)	30 October 1923	22 November 1924	1 year, 23 days	Republican People's Party	İnönü II	Mustafa Kemal Atatürk (1923–1938)
2		Fethi Okyar (1880–1943)	1923 (2nd)	22 November 1924	6 March 1925	104 days	Republican People's Party	Okyar	Mustafa Kemal Atatürk (1923–1938)
(1)		İsmet İnönü (1884–1973)	1923 (2nd)	6 March 1925	1 November 1937	12 years, 240 days	Republican People's Party	İnönü III	Mustafa Kemal Atatürk (1923–1938)
(1)		İsmet İnönü (1884–1973)	1927 (3rd)	6 March 1925	1 November 1937	12 years, 240 days	Republican People's Party	İnönü IV	Mustafa Kemal Atatürk (1923–1938)
(1)		İsmet İnönü (1884–1973)	1927 (3rd)	6 March 1925	1 November 1937	12 years, 240 days	Republican People's Party	İnönü V	Mustafa Kemal Atatürk (1923–1938)
(1)		İsmet İnönü (1884–1973)	1931 (4th)	6 March 1925	1 November 1937	12 years, 240 days	Republican People's Party	İnönü VI	Mustafa Kemal Atatürk (1923–1938)
(1)		İsmet İnönü (1884–1973)	1935 (5th)	6 March 1925	1 November 1937	12 years, 240 days	Republican People's Party	İnönü VII	Mustafa Kemal Atatürk (1923–1938)
3		Celâl Bayar (1883–1986)	1935 (5th)	1 November 1937	25 January 1939	1 year, 85 days	Republican People's Party	Bayar I	Mustafa Kemal Atatürk (1923–1938)
3		Celâl Bayar (1883–1986)	1935 (5th)	1 November 1937	25 January 1939	1 year, 85 days	Republican People's Party	Bayar II	İsmet İnönü (1938–1950)
4		Refik Saydam (1881–1942)	1935 (5th)	25 January 1939	8 July 1942 (Died in office)	3 years, 164 days	Republican People's Party	Saydam I	İsmet İnönü (1938–1950)
4		Refik Saydam (1881–1942)	1939 (6th)	25 January 1939	8 July 1942 (Died in office)	3 years, 164 days	Republican People's Party	Saydam II	İsmet İnönü (1938–1950)
5		Şükrü Saracoğlu (1887–1953)	1939 (6th)	8 July 1942	7 August 1946	4 years, 30 days	Republican People's Party	Saracoğlu I	İsmet İnönü (1938–1950)
5		Şükrü Saracoğlu (1887–1953)	1943 (7th)	8 July 1942	7 August 1946	4 years, 30 days	Republican People's Party	Saracoğlu II	İsmet İnönü (1938–1950)
6		Recep Peker (1889–1950)	1946 (8th)	7 August 1946	9 September 1947	1 year, 33 days	Republican People's Party	Peker	İsmet İnönü (1938–1950)
7		Hasan Saka (1885–1960)	1946 (8th)	9 September 1947	16 January 1949	1 year, 129 days	Republican People's Party	Saka I	İsmet İnönü (1938–1950)
7		Hasan Saka (1885–1960)	1946 (8th)	9 September 1947	16 January 1949	1 year, 129 days	Republican People's Party	Saka II	İsmet İnönü (1938–1950)
8		Şemsettin Günaltay (1883–1961)	1946 (8th)	16 January 1949	22 May 1950	1 year, 126 days	Republican People's Party	Günaltay	İsmet İnönü (1938–1950)
9		Adnan Menderes (1899–1961)	1950 (9th)	22 May 1950	27 May 1960 (Deposed)	10 years, 5 days	Democrat Party	Menderes I	Celâl Bayar (1950–1960)
9		Adnan Menderes (1899–1961)	1950 (9th)	22 May 1950	27 May 1960 (Deposed)	10 years, 5 days	Democrat Party	Menderes II	Celâl Bayar (1950–1960)
9		Adnan Menderes (1899–1961)	1954 (10th)	22 May 1950	27 May 1960 (Deposed)	10 years, 5 days	Democrat Party	Menderes III	Celâl Bayar (1950–1960)
9		Adnan Menderes (1899–1961)	1954 (10th)	22 May 1950	27 May 1960 (Deposed)	10 years, 5 days	Democrat Party	Menderes IV	Celâl Bayar (1950–1960)
9		Adnan Menderes (1899–1961)	1957 (11th)	22 May 1950	27 May 1960 (Deposed)	10 years, 5 days	Democrat Party	Menderes V	Celâl Bayar (1950–1960)
10		Cemal Gürsel (1895–1966)	—	27 May 1960	27 October 1961	1 year, 153 days	Military	Gürsel I	National Unity Committee (1960–1961)
10		Cemal Gürsel (1895–1966)	—	27 May 1960	27 October 1961	1 year, 153 days	Military	Gürsel II	National Unity Committee (1960–1961)
(1)		İsmet İnönü (1884–1973)	1961 (12th)	27 October 1961	20 February 1965	3 years, 116 days	Republican People's Party	İnönü VIII	Cemal Gürsel (1961–1966)
(1)		İsmet İnönü (1884–1973)	1961 (12th)	27 October 1961	20 February 1965	3 years, 116 days	Republican People's Party	İnönü IX	Cemal Gürsel (1961–1966)
(1)		İsmet İnönü (1884–1973)	1961 (12th)	27 October 1961	20 February 1965	3 years, 116 days	Republican People's Party	İnönü X	Cemal Gürsel (1961–1966)
11		Suat Hayri Ürgüplü (1903–1981)	1961 (12th)	20 February 1965	27 October 1965	249 days	Justice Party	Ürgüplü	Cemal Gürsel (1961–1966)
12		Süleyman Demirel (1924–2015)	1965 (13th)	27 October 1965	26 March 1971 (Note: Resigned after the 1971 military memorandum.)	5 years, 150 days	Justice Party	Demirel I	Cemal Gürsel (1961–1966)
12		Süleyman Demirel (1924–2015)	1969 (14th)	27 October 1965	26 March 1971	5 years, 150 days	Justice Party	Demirel II	Cevdet Sunay (1966–1973)
12		Süleyman Demirel (1924–2015)	1969 (14th)	27 October 1965	26 March 1971	5 years, 150 days	Justice Party	Demirel III	Cevdet Sunay (1966–1973)
13		Nihat Erim (1912–1980)	1969 (14th)	26 March 1971	17 April 1972	1 year, 22 days	Independent	Erim I	Cevdet Sunay (1966–1973)
13		Nihat Erim (1912–1980)	1969 (14th)	26 March 1971	17 April 1972	1 year, 22 days	Independent	Erim II	Cevdet Sunay (1966–1973)
14		Ferit Melen (1906–1988)	1969 (14th)	17 April 1972	15 April 1973	363 days	Republican Reliance Party	Melen	Cevdet Sunay (1966–1973)
15		Naim Talu (1919–1998)	1973 (15th)	15 April 1973	25 January 1974	285 days	Independent	Talu	Fahri Korutürk (1973–1980)
16		Bülent Ecevit (1925–2006)	1973 (15th)	25 January 1974	17 November 1974	296 days	Republican People's Party	Ecevit I	Fahri Korutürk (1973–1980)
17		Sadi Irmak (1906–1990)	1973 (15th)	17 November 1974	31 March 1975	134 days	Independent	Irmak	Fahri Korutürk (1973–1980)
(12)		Süleyman Demirel (1924–2015)	1973 (15th)	31 March 1975	21 June 1977	2 years, 82 days	Justice Party	Demirel IV	Fahri Korutürk (1973–1980)
(16)		Bülent Ecevit (1925–2006)	1977 (16th)	21 June 1977	21 July 1977	30 days	Republican People's Party	Ecevit II	Fahri Korutürk (1973–1980)
(12)		Süleyman Demirel (1924–2015)	1977 (16th)	21 July 1977	5 January 1978	168 days	Justice Party	Demirel V	Fahri Korutürk (1973–1980)
(16)		Bülent Ecevit (1925–2006)	1977 (16th)	5 January 1978	12 November 1979	1 year, 311 days	Republican People's Party	Ecevit III	Fahri Korutürk (1973–1980)
(12)		Süleyman Demirel (1924–2015)	1977 (16th)	12 November 1979	12 September 1980 (Deposed)	305 days	Justice Party	Demirel VI	Fahri Korutürk (1973–1980)
18		Bülend Ulusu (1922–2015)	—	21 September 1980	13 December 1983	3 years, 83 days	Military	Ulusu	National Security Council (1980–1982)
18		Bülend Ulusu (1922–2015)	—	21 September 1980	13 December 1983	3 years, 83 days	Military	Ulusu	Kenan Evren (1982–1989)
19		Turgut Özal (1927–1993)	1983 (17th)	13 December 1983	9 November 1989	5 years, 331 days	Motherland Party	Özal I	Kenan Evren (1982–1989)
19		Turgut Özal (1927–1993)	1987 (18th)	13 December 1983	9 November 1989	5 years, 331 days	Motherland Party	Özal II	Kenan Evren (1982–1989)
20		Yıldırım Akbulut (1935–2021)	1987 (18th)	9 November 1989	23 June 1991	1 year, 226 days	Motherland Party	Akbulut	Turgut Özal (1989–1993)
21		Mesut Yılmaz (1947–2020)	1987 (18th)	23 June 1991	20 November 1991	150 days	Motherland Party	Yılmaz I	Turgut Özal (1989–1993)
(12)		Süleyman Demirel (1924–2015)	1991 (19th)	20 November 1991	16 May 1993	1 year, 177 days	True Path Party	Demirel VII	Turgut Özal (1989–1993)
22		Tansu Çiller (born 1946)	1991 (19th)	25 June 1993	6 March 1996	2 years, 255 days	True Path Party	Çiller I	Süleyman Demirel (1993–2000)
22		Tansu Çiller (born 1946)	1991 (19th)	25 June 1993	6 March 1996	2 years, 255 days	True Path Party	Çiller II	Süleyman Demirel (1993–2000)
22		Tansu Çiller (born 1946)	1991 (19th)	25 June 1993	6 March 1996	2 years, 255 days	True Path Party	Çiller III	Süleyman Demirel (1993–2000)
(21)		Mesut Yılmaz (1947–2020)	1995 (20th)	6 March 1996	28 June 1996	114 days	Motherland Party	Yılmaz II	Süleyman Demirel (1993–2000)
23		Necmettin Erbakan (1926–2011)	1995 (20th)	28 June 1996	30 June 1997 (Note: Resigned after the 1997 military memorandum.)	1 year, 2 days	Welfare Party	Erbakan	Süleyman Demirel (1993–2000)
(21)		Mesut Yılmaz (1947–2020)	1995 (20th)	30 June 1997	11 January 1999	1 year, 195 days	Motherland Party	Yılmaz III	Süleyman Demirel (1993–2000)
(16)		Bülent Ecevit (1925–2006)	1995 (20th)	11 January 1999	18 November 2002	3 years, 311 days	Democratic Left Party	Ecevit IV	Süleyman Demirel (1993–2000)
(16)		Bülent Ecevit (1925–2006)	1999 (21st)	11 January 1999	18 November 2002	3 years, 311 days	Democratic Left Party	Ecevit V	Ahmet Necdet Sezer (2000–2007)
24		Abdullah Gül (born 1949)	2002 (22nd)	18 November 2002	14 March 2003	116 days	Justice and Development Party	Gül	Ahmet Necdet Sezer (2000–2007)
25		Recep Tayyip Erdoğan (born 1954)	2002 (22nd)	14 March 2003	29 August 2014	11 years, 168 days	Justice and Development Party	Erdoğan I	Ahmet Necdet Sezer (2000–2007)
25		Recep Tayyip Erdoğan (born 1954)	2007 (23nd)	14 March 2003	29 August 2014	11 years, 168 days	Justice and Development Party	Erdoğan II	Abdullah Gül (2007–2014)
25		Recep Tayyip Erdoğan (born 1954)	2011 (24th)	14 March 2003	29 August 2014	11 years, 168 days	Justice and Development Party	Erdoğan III	Abdullah Gül (2007–2014)
26		Ahmet Davutoğlu (born 1959)	2011 (24th)	29 August 2014	24 May 2016	1 year, 269 days	Justice and Development Party	Davutoğlu I	Recep Tayyip Erdoğan (2014–2018)
26		Ahmet Davutoğlu (born 1959)	Jun. 2015 (25th)	29 August 2014	24 May 2016	1 year, 269 days	Justice and Development Party	Davutoğlu II	Recep Tayyip Erdoğan (2014–2018)
26		Ahmet Davutoğlu (born 1959)	Nov. 2015 (26th)	29 August 2014	24 May 2016	1 year, 269 days	Justice and Development Party	Davutoğlu III	Recep Tayyip Erdoğan (2014–2018)
27		Binali Yıldırım (born 1955)	Nov. 2015 (26th)	24 May 2016	9 July 2018	2 years, 46 days	Justice and Development Party	Yıldırım	Recep Tayyip Erdoğan (2014–2018)

== See also ==
- Prime Minister of Turkey
  - List of prime ministers of Turkey by time in office
- President of Turkey
  - List of presidents of Turkey
- Vice President of Turkey
- Coalition governments in Turkey
- List of cabinets of Turkey
- List of female ministers of Turkey
- List of Grand Viziers of the Ottoman Empire
