= Cihat Bilgehan =

Turkish lawyer and politician (1923–1981)

Minister of Finance
- In office 21 July 1977 – 5 January 1978
- Prime Minister: Süleyman Demirel
- In office 14 November 1966 – 3 November 1969
- Prime Minister: Süleyman Demirel

Minister of State
- In office 27 October 1965 – 14 November 1966
- Prime Minister: Süleyman Demirel

Minister of National Education
- In office 20 February 1965 – October 1965
- Prime Minister: Suat Hayri Ürgüplü

Personal details
- Born: 1927 Keskin, Kırıkkale, Turkey
- Died: 15 June 1981 (aged 57–58) Burhaniye, Balıkesir, Turkey
- Party: Democrat Party; Justice Party
- Children: 4
- Education: Ankara University
- Occupation: Jurist; Lawyer

Cihat Bilgehan (1923–1981) was a Turkish jurist and politician. He was a member of the Turkish Parliament from 1961 to 1980 and served in various cabinet posts in the 1960s and 1970s.

== Early life and education ==
He was born in Keskin, Kırıkkale, in 1923. He graduated from the Faculty of Law at Ankara University in 1944.

== Career ==
Following his graduation Bilgehan worked as a judge in different places until 1955 when he resigned from the post. Then he worked as a lawyer in Balıkesir and was involved in politics being a member of the Democrat Party. He became a cofounder of the Justice Party in 1961 and was elected to the Parliament from Balıkesir. His tenure at the Parliament continued until the military coup on 12 September 1980. He was elected to the general executive board of the Justice Party in the second and third congresses held in December 1964 and in 1966, respectively. During this period Bilgehan was part of Sadettin Bilgiç's circle within the Justice Party which formed the party's right-conservative wing.

Bilgehan was appointed minister of national education to the coalition cabinet headed by Suat Hayri Ürgüplü on 20 February 1965. He was named as the minister of state to the first cabinet of Süleyman Demirel on 27 October 1965. His tenure ended on 14 November 1966 when he was appointed minister of finance.

Bilgehan was the deputy chairman of the Justice Party's parliamentary group in 1977. Then he served as the minister of finance for a second time in the fifth cabinet of Süleyman Demirel between 21 July 1977 and 5 January 1978. In the same cabinet Bilgehan also assumed the post of acting minister of defense from 14 October to 28 October 1977.

== Personal life and death ==
Bilgehan was married and had four children.

Bilgehan died in Burhaniye, Balıkesir, on 15 June 1981.
