= Minister of State (Turkey) =

Minister of State (Turkish: Devlet Bakanlığı) in the former Turkish governments was a post in the cabinet between 7 August 1946 and 14 June 2011. It was legalized by the Act No. 4951 of 1946. Minister-of-State practice began by the 15th government led by Recep Peker and ended after the 60th government led Recep Tayyip Erdoğan in July 2011. The number of the state ministers was not constant. In the 1940s, there was only one minister of state, namely Abdülhalik Renda, who served in three consecutive governments. Later, the number was increased, and especially during the coalition cabinets, many ministers of state were appointed in the cabinet. The list below shows the number of state ministers in each government.

Government no.	No. of seats for the Minister of State	No. of ministers served in these posts (with replacements)	Reference
15	1	1	
16	1	1	
17	1	1	
18	1	2	
19	1	1	
20	2	5	
21	3	4	
22	4	5	
23	3	6	
24	2	4	
25	2	4	
26	4	5	
27	3	5	
28	3	4	
29	3	3	
30	5	7	
31	4	4	
32	4	5	
33	2	3	
34	4	4	
35	4	4	
36	4	4	
37	3	3	
38	3	3	
39	4	5	
40	3	3	
41	4	5	
42	4	4	
43	6	6	
44	4	4	
45	7	12	
46	10	14	
47	13	14	
48	13	14	
49	14	15	
50	15	32	
51	11	11	
52	15	15	
53	14	14	
54	19	19	
55	19	20	
56	5	5	
57	17	31	
58	4	4	
59	5	5	
60	10	13	
