= Faruk Sükan =

Turkish physician and politician (1921–2005)

Deputy Prime Minister
- In office 5 January 1978 – 20 September 1979
- Prime Minister: Bülent Ecevit
- Serving with: Orhan Eyüpoğlu; Hikmet Çetin; Turhan Feyzioğlu
- Preceded by: Necmettin Erbakan; Alparslan Türkeş
- Succeeded by: Turgut Özal; Zeyyat Baykara

Minister of Interior
- In office 27 October 1965 – 1 August 1969
- Prime Minister: Süleyman Demirel
- Preceded by: Izzet Gener
- Succeeded by: Salih Ragip Üner

Minister of Health
- In office 20 February 1965 – 27 October 1965
- Prime Minister: Suat Hayri Ürgüplü
- Preceded by: Kemal Demir
- Succeeded by: Edip Somunoğlu

Personal details
- Born: Mehmet Faruk Sükan; 1921 Karaman, Turkey
- Died: January 3, 2005 (aged 83–84) Ankara, Turkey
- Resting place: Cebeci Asri Cemetery, Ankara
- Party: Democrat Party; Justice Party; Democratic Party
- Children: 4
- Education: Istanbul University
- Occupation: Physician

Faruk Sükan (1921 – 3 January 2005) was a Turkish physician, politician and government minister.

== Biography ==
Sükan was born in Karaman. In 1946, he graduated from the School of Medicine at Istanbul University. After practicing as a Doctor of Medicine, he got interested in politics, and joined Democrat Party (DP). In 1957, he was elected as the mayor of Ereğli in Konya Province. The government of the Democrat Party was overthrown during the 1960 coup d'état. After the DP was banned, Sükan joined the succeeding Justice Party (AP). He entered the parliament as a deputy of Konya Province after the 1961 general elections. In the 29th government of Turkey, he was appointed the Minister of Health (20 February 1965 – 27 October 1965). In the 30th government of Turkey, he served as the Minister of Interior (27 October 1965 – 1 August 1969). On 18 December 1970, he took part in establishing the Democratic Party along with a number of the Justice Party politicians. In the 42nd government of Turkey, Sükan became the deputy prime minister (5 January 1978 – 20 September 1979). On 18 December 1978, he was elected as the chairman of the Democratic Party. Following the 1980 coup d'état, he left politics.

Sükan died on 3 January 2005 in Ankara. He was buried at Cebeci Asri Cemetery following a memorial ceremony in front of the parliament building and the religious funeral at Kocatepe Mosque. He was married with four children.

Political offices
Preceded by Kemal Demir	Minister of Health; 20 February 1965 – 27 October 1965	Succeeded by Edip Somunoğlu
Preceded by Izzet Gener	Minister of Interior; 27 October 1965 – 1 August 1969	Succeeded by Salih Ragip Üner
Preceded by Necmettin Erbakan; Alparslan Türkeş	Deputy Prime Minister of Turkey; 5 January 1978 – 20 September 1979; With: Orhan Eyüpoğlu; Hikmet Çetin; Turhan Feyzioğlu	Succeeded by Turgut Özal; Zeyyat Baykara
