= Etem Erdinç =

Turkish politician

İbrahim Etem Erdinç

Ministry of Public Works
- In office 27 October 1965 – 3 April 1967
- Prime Minister: Süleyman Demirel
- Preceded by: Orhan Alp
- Succeeded by: Orhan Alp

Personal details
- Born: 1913 Kütahya, Ottoman Empire
- Died: 1998 (aged 84–85) Ankara, Turkey
- Party: Justice Party (AP)
- Education: Civil engineering
- Alma mater: Istanbul Technical University
- Occupation: Civil servant, politician
- Profession: Civil engineering

İbrahim Etem Erdinç (1913–1998) was a Turkish civil engineer, politician and a former government minister.

Etem Erdinç was born in Kütahya in 1913. In 1937 he graduated from the Istanbul Engineers' School (later named Istanbul Technical University) . He served for Turkish State Railways (TCDD). He was the regional director of TCDD in Sivas. He joined the Democrat Party (DP) and was elected deputy from Sivas Province in the 10th Parliament of Turkey between 1954 and 1957. He returned to politics after 1964 as a member of Justice Party (AP). In the elections for the 1/3 of the Turkish Senate held on 7 June 1964 he was elected senator from Kütahya Province. He kept this seat up to 14 October 1973. In the 30th government of Turkey he was appointed as the Ministry of Public Works serving between 27 October 1965 and 3 April 1967.

He was married and father of three. He died in 1998.
