= Sadettin Bilgiç =

Turkish politician (1920–2012)

30th Ministry of National Defense
- In office 21 July 1977 – 18 October 1977
- President: Fahri Korutürk
- Prime Minister: Bülent Ecevit
- Preceded by: Hasan Esat Işık
- Succeeded by: Turhan Kapanlı

26th Ministry of Transport and Infrastructure
- In office 3 April 1967 – 1 August 1969
- President: Cevdet Sunay
- Prime Minister: Süleyman Demirel
- Preceded by: Seyfi Öztürk
- Succeeded by: Mehmet İzmen

Personal details
- Born: 23 December 1920 Şarkikaraağaç, Turkey
- Died: 20 September 2012 (aged 91)
- Party: Justice Party
- Other political affiliations: Democratic Party
- Education: Istanbul University

Mehmet Sadettin Bilgiç (23 December 1920 – 20 September 2012), also known by his nickname as Koca Reis, was a Turkish politician and surgeon who served as the 26th minister of Transport and Infrastructure from 3 April 1967 to 1 August 1969, and the 30th minister of National Defense from 21 July 1977 to 18 October 1977.

== Early life ==
Bilgiç was born in Şarkikaraağaç, Turkey. He received his primary schooling in Isparta. He obtained his graduation from Kayseri's high school in 1939. He graduated in medicine from the Istanbul University in 1947 and subsequently worked as a general medical practitioner at various locations until 1957.

Bilgiç became general assistant surgeon at Ankara Numune Hospital in 1957 and surgeon in April 1961.

== Political career ==
He entered in the political race in 1962 when he became deputy and represented Isparta Province as Justice Party's candidate in the 1961 Turkish general election. He was later appointed deputy chairman of the party in April 1964 until November 1964. He was elected as a deputy of Istanbul in the 1965 general election and subsequently was elected as minister of Transport on 3 April 1967.

Bilgiç was re-elected as deputy of Istanbul in the 1969 general election, however, he was removed from the Justice Party along with his colleagues in June 1970. Following his removal from the party, he founded Democratic Party in 1970 and was elected deputy of Istanbul in the 1973 general election as a candidate of his own party. He left the party in 1975 and rejoined the Justice Party in 1976. He became deputy chairman of the Justice Party following his return.

In the 1977 general election, he was re-elected as deputy of Istanbul. He was elected as the minister of National Defense in the 4th government of Turkey, however he resigned from the post on 18 October 1977.

He became was banned from politics for 10 years under the 1982 Constitution. He was forced to live in the Çanakkale Front, Zincirbozan where he spent 4 months from June 1983 to September.

Bilgiç returned to politics in 1988 and was appointed to the general administrative board of the True Path Party general and served at this position until 1990. He left his de facto political life after the failure of the Justice Party in the Grand National Assembly of Turkey.
