= 31st government of Turkey =

Government of the Republic of Turkey (1969-1970)

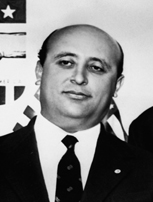
Süleyman Demirel, 1962

The 31st government of Turkey (November 3, 1969 – March 6, 1970) was a government in the history of Turkey. It is known as second Demirel government.

== Background ==
Justice Party (AP) won the elections held on October 12, 1969. Süleyman Demirel, the leader of the Justice Party, founded the government.

== The government ==
In the list below, the serving period of cabinet members who served only a part of the cabinet's lifespan are shown in the column "Notes".

Title	Name	Party	Notes
Prime Minister	Süleyman Demirel	AP	
Minister of State
Minister of State	Refet Sezgin	AP	
Minister of State	Hüsamettin Atabeyli	AP	
Minister of State	Gürhan Titrek	AP	November 3, 1969 – January 21, 1970
Minister of State	Turhan Biilgin	AP	
Ministry of Justice	Yusuf Ziya Önder	AP	
Ministry of National Defense	Ahmet Topaloğlu	AP	
Ministry of the Interior	Haldun Menteşoğlu	AP	
Ministry of Foreign Affairs	İhsan Sabri Çağlayangil	AP	
Ministry of Finance and Customs	Ali Mesut Erez	AP	
Ministry of National Education	Orhan Oğuz	AP	
Ministry of Public Works	Yaşar Gülez	AP	
Ministry of Construction and Settlement	Hayrettin Nakiboğlu	AP	
Ministry of Health and Social Security	Vedat Ali Özkan	AP	
Ministry of Agriculture	İlhami Ertem	AP	
Ministry of Village Affairs	Turhan Kapanlı	AP	
Ministry of Forestry	Hüseyin Özalp	AP	
Ministry of Transport	Nahit Menteşe	AP	
Ministry of Labour	Seyfi Öztürk	AP	
Ministry of Commerce	Ahmet Dallı; Gürhan Titrek	AP	November 3, 1969 – January 7, 1970; January 21, 1970 – March 6, 1970
Ministry of Industry	Selahattin Kılıç	AP	
Ministry of Customs and Monopolies	Ahmet İhsan Birincioğlu	AP	
Ministry Tourism	Necmettin Cevheri	AP	
Ministry of Energy and Natural Resources	Sabit Osman Avcı	AP	
Ministry of Youth and Sports	İsmet Sezgin	AP	

== Aftermath ==
Justice Party had a majority in the parliament. Soon, however, two opposition groups appeared in the party; those supporting the former Democratic Party politicians and those trying to form a rightist party. Thus, the government ended because of a vote of no confidence in the interpellation voting on February 11, 1970. The next government, however, was again founded by Demirel.

Preceded by 30th government of Turkey (Süleyman Demirel)	31st Government of Turkey; November 3, 1969 – March 6, 1970	Succeeded by 32nd government of Turkey (Süleyman Demirel)
