= List of prime ministers of Turkey by time in office =

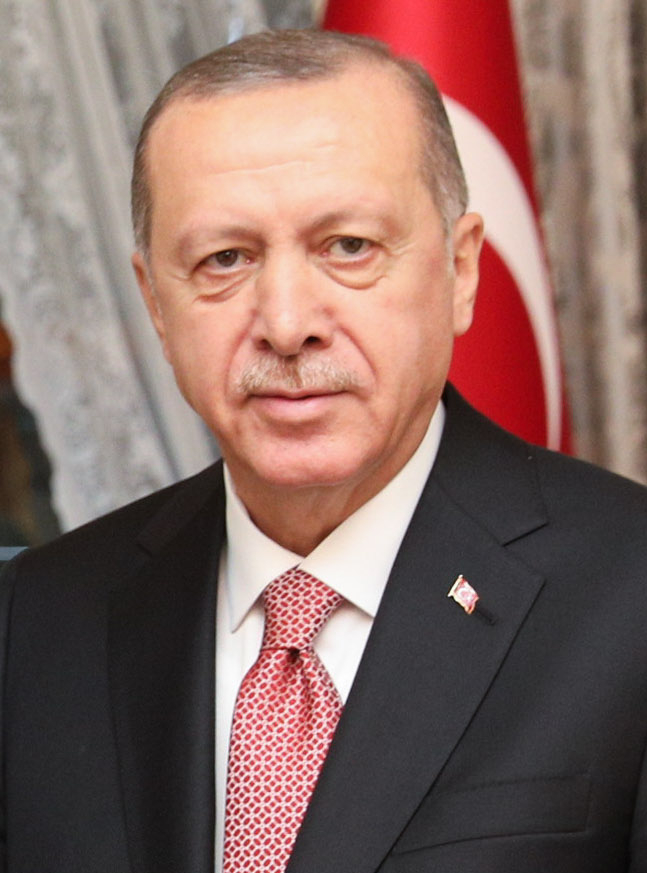
11 years and 167 days:
Recep Tayyip Erdoğan
(2003–2014)

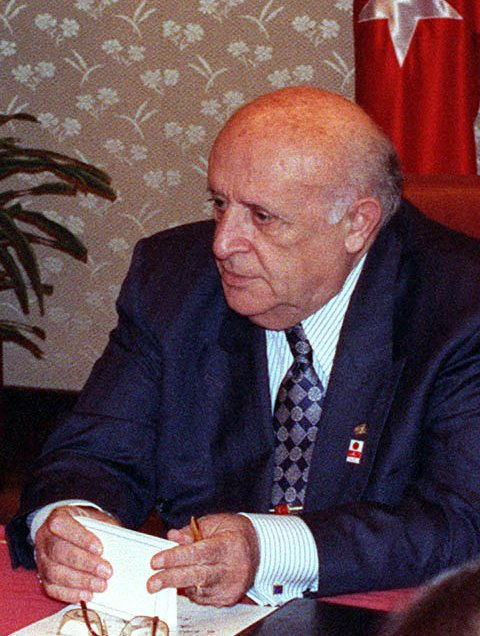
10 years and 152 days:
Süleyman Demirel (1965-1971, 1975-1977, 1977-1978, 1979-1980 and 1991-1993)

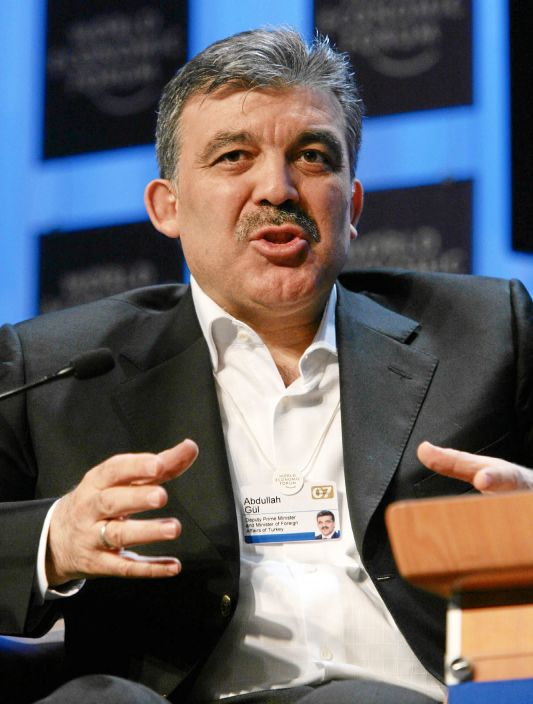
116 days:
Abdullah Gül (2002-2003)

This article lists each prime minister of Turkey in order of term length. The list starts with heads of the Government of the Grand National Assembly on May 3, 1920, and the first prime minister, Mustafa Kemal Atatürk. It includes all prime ministers since then, up to the last prime minister. The list is based on the difference between dates; if counted by number of calendar days, figures would be one day greater for each term served.

Of the 30 prime ministers, 4 served more than 10 years while seven served less than a year. İsmet İnönü is the longest-serving Turkish Prime Ministers with 16 years accumulated in total. The prime minister with the longest single term was Recep Tayyip Erdoğan, lasting 11 years from 2003 until 2014.

== Ordered by tenure ==
In this table, "Term of office" is the number of separate, discontiguous periods served as Prime Minister.

Rank	Prime Minister	Length served	Terms in office	Cabinets	Party	Start
1	İsmet İnönü	16 years, 318 days	3	10	Republican People's Party	1923
2	Recep Tayyip Erdoğan	11 years, 167 days	1	3	Justice and Development Party	2003
3	Süleyman Demirel	10 years, 152 days	5	7	Justice Party	1965
4	Adnan Menderes	10 years, 5 days	1	5	Democrat Party	1950
5	Turgut Özal	5 years, 322 days	1	2	Motherland Party	1983
6	Bülent Ecevit	5 years, 208 days	4	5	Republican People's Party	1974
7	Şükrü Saracoğlu	4 years, 29 days	1	2	Republican People's Party	1942
8	Refik Saydam	3 years, 164 days	1	2	Republican People's Party	1939
9	Bülend Ulusu	3 years, 84 days	1	1	Martial law	1980
10	Tansu Çiller	2 years, 255 days	1	3	True Path Party	1993
11	Mesut Yılmaz	2 years, 94 days	3	3	Motherland Party	1991
12	Binali Yıldırım	2 years, 46 days	1	1	Justice and Development Party	2016
13	Ahmet Davutoğlu	1 year, 269 days	1	3	Justice and Development Party	2014
14	Yıldırım Akbulut	1 year, 226 days	1	1	Motherland Party	1989
15	Fevzi Çakmak	1 year, 166 days	1	2	Republican People's Party	1921
16	Cemal Gürsel	1 year, 152 days	1	2	Martial law	1960
17	Hasan Saka	1 year, 128 days	1	2	Republican People's Party	1947
18	Şemsettin Günaltay	1 year, 126 days	1	1	Republican People's Party	1949
19	Celâl Bayar	1 year, 85 days	1	2	Republican People's Party	1937
20	Recep Peker	1 year, 33 days	1	1	Republican People's Party	1946
21	Rauf Orbay	1 year, 23 days	1	1	Republican People's Party	1922
22	Nihat Erim	1 year, 22 days	1	2	Independent	1971
23	Necmettin Erbakan	1 year, 2 days	1	1	Welfare Party	1996
24	Ferit Melen	363 days	1	1	Republican Reliance Party	1973
25	Naim Talu	285 days	1	1	Independent	1974
26	Mustafa Kemal Atatürk	266 days	1	1	Republican People's Party	1920
27	Suat Hayri Ürgüplü	249 days	1	1	Independent	1965
28	Fethi Okyar	178 days	2	2	Republican People's Party	1923
29	Sadi Irmak	134 days	1	1	Independent	1975
30	Abdullah Gül	116 days	1	1	Justice and Development Party	2002

=== By party ===
Rank	Party	Length by time served	Prime ministers
1	Republican People's Party	34 years, 318 days	13
2	Justice and Development Party	15 years, 233 days	4
3	Democrat Party	10 years, 5 days	1
4	Motherland Party	9 years, 277 days	3
5	Justice Party	8 years, 340 days	1
6	Martial law	4 years, 236 days	2
7	True Path Party	4 years, 67 days	2
8	Democratic Left Party	3 years, 311 days	1
9	Independent	2 years, 325 days	4
10	Welfare Party	1 year, 2 days	1
11	Republican Reliance Party	363 days	1

== See also ==
- List of prime ministers of Turkey
- List of prime ministers of Canada by time in office
- List of prime ministers of the United Kingdom by length of tenure
