= Necmettin Cevheri =

Turkish lawyer and politician (1930–2023)

Minister of State; Deputy Prime Minister
- In office October 1995 – October 1995
- Prime Minister: Tansu Çiller

Minister of Agriculture and Rural Affairs
- In office 20 November 1991 – 25 June 1993
- Prime Minister: Süleyman Demirel

Minister of Justice
- In office 21 July 1977 – 5 January 1978
- Prime Minister: Süleyman Demirel
- Preceded by: Selçuk Erverdi
- Succeeded by: Mehmet Can

Minister of Tourism
- In office 3 November 1969 – 1971
- Prime Minister: Süleyman Demirel

Personal details
- Born: 1930 Şanlıurfa, Turkey
- Died: 5 September 2023 (aged 93) Ankara, Turkey
- Resting place: Cebeci Asri Cemetery, Ankara
- Party: Democrat; Justice; True Path
- Spouse: Yüksel Cevheri (died 2021)
- Children: 2
- Education: Ankara University
- Occupation: Farmer; lawyer; politician

Necmettin Cevheri (1930 – 5 September 2023) was a Turkish farmer, lawyer, and politician who held various cabinet posts. He was a member of the Democrat Party, Justice Party, and True Path Party.

== Early life and education ==
Cevheri was born in Şanlıurfa in 1930. He was a member of the Kurdish origin Şeyhanlı tribe. His father, Hacı Ömer, was among those who defended Urfa during the War of Independence and was awarded with the Medal of Independence for his contributions to the battles against the occupying British and French forces in 1920. He was elected as a member of the Parliament for the Democrat Party from Şanlıurfa in 1950 and died in 1952 while serving in the post. Cevheri's mother was Fatma Hanım who died during his childhood. The family had to leave Şanlıurfa in the mid-1930s when the resettlement law was put into force, and they settled in Amasya and then in Adana.

Cevheri received his primary education in three different cities. He graduated from Galatasaray High School and obtained a law degree from Ankara University.

== Career ==
Cevheri joined the Democrat Party in January 1951 and was part of the party's Şanlıurfa branch. After his graduation, he was involved in agricultural activities in Şanlıurfa where he also worked as a lawyer from 1957. The same year he became the provincial head of the party.

Following the closure of the Democrat Party in 1960, Cevheri became a member of the Justice Party and was elected as its provincial head in Şanlıurfa in 1963. He was elected to the Turkish Parliament representing Şanlıurfa in 1965. He was also elected as a deputy in the 1969 general elections. He was appointed minister of tourism on 3 November 1969. He served in the post in the second and third cabinets of Prime Minister Süleyman Demirel until 1971. Cevheri was named as the minister of justice on 21 July 1977 succeeding Selçuk Erverdi in the post. The cabinet was led by again Süleyman Demirel. Cevheri's tenure ended on 5 January 1978, and he was replaced by Mehmet Can as the minister of justice.

Cevheri cofounded the True Path Party after the closure of the Justice Party on 12 September 1980 when the Turkish army seized power. He was one of the politicians who were banned by the military government from political activity, and his political ban was lifted in 1987. He was elected to the Parliament in the general elections held in 1990 and 1995 representing Şanlıurfa. He was the minister of agriculture and rural affairs in the cabinet led by Süleyman Demirel between 20 November 1991 and 25 June 1993. When Demirel, leader of the True Path Party, was elected as the President of Turkey, Cevheri was one of the candidates for the party chairmanship in 1993. However, he left the race, and Tansu Çiller became the leader of the party defeating Köksal Toptan and Mehmet Dülger.

Cevheri was deputy prime minister in the cabinet of Tansu Çiller in October 1995. He was appointed minister of state in the following cabinet of Çiller and was in charge of the various state institutions, including the Presidency of Religious Affairs. As of 1997 he was deputy chairman of the True Path Party. In the late May 1997 he and other deputies of the party resigned which would lead to the collapse of the coalition cabinet formed by the True Path Party and the Islamist Welfare Party. The cabinet was headed by the Welfare Party leader Necmettin Erbakan.

Before the 1999 general election Cevheri won the preliminary election in Şanlıurfa becoming the first candidate in the list, but Çiller decided to identify the candidate list herself. However, Cevheri managed to be elected as a deputy. After this incident Cevheri together with Esat Kıratlıoğlu and Nahit Menteşe began to act as opposition leaders against Çiller. Following the elections Cevheri was a member of the General Administrative Council of the party. He retired from politics in 2002.

== Personal life and death ==
Cevheri's wife, Yüksel, died on 2 August 2021 and was buried in Ankara. He had two children, a son and a daughter His son, İbrahim Cevher, is also a politician and served as a member of the Parliament for the True Path Party representing Adana at the 20th term. Cevheri himself was also serving at the Parliament during the same term. Cevheri's nephew, Mehmet Ali Cevheri, is a member of the Parliament for the Justice and Development Party from Şanlıurfa.

Cevheri died at Güven Hospital, Ankara, on 5 September 2023, at the age of 93. A funeral ceremony was organized for him the next day at the Parliament, and he was buried in Cebeci Asri cemetery, Ankara. Various leading politicians attended the ceremony, including Kemal Kılıçdaroğlu, Devlet Bahçeli, Meral Akşener, Bülent Arınç, Köksal Toptan and Mehmet Ali Şahin. Galatasaray S.K. published a condolence message for Cevheri on the same day.
