= 32nd government of Turkey =

Government of the Republic of Turkey (1970-1971)

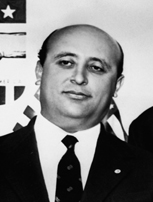
Süleyman Demirel, 1962

The 32nd government of Turkey (6 March 1970 – 26 March 1971) was a significant administration in Turkish history. It is also referred as the third Demirel government.

== Background ==
Justice Party (AP) had the majority in the parliament, but largely because of a split in the party, the prime minister Süleyman Demirel failed to receive the confidence vote in the interpellation voting on 11 February 1970. However, AP still had the majority, and Demirel founded the next government as well. The cabinet was almost the same as that of the previous government.

== The government ==
In the list below, the serving period of cabinet members who served only a part of the cabinet's lifespan are shown in the column "Notes".

Title	Name	Party	Notes
Prime Minister	Süleyman Demirel	AP	
Minister of State
Minister of State	Refet Sezgin; Hasan Dincer	AP	6 March 1970 – 16 July 1970; 29 July 1970 – 26 March 1971
Minister of State	Hüsamettin Atabeyli	AP	
Minister of State	Gürhan Titrek	AP	3 November 1969 – 21 January 1970
Minister of State	Turhan Biilgin	AP	
Ministry of Justice	Yusuf Ziya Önder	AP	
Ministry of National Defense	Ahmet Topaloğlu	AP	
Ministry of the Interior	Haldun Menteşoğlu	AP	
Ministry of Foreign Affairs	İhsan Sabri Çağlayangil	AP	
Ministry of Finance and Customs	Ali Mesut Erez	AP	
Ministry of National Education	Orhan Oğuz	AP	
Ministry of Public Works	Yaşar Gülez	AP	
Ministry of Construction and Settlement	Hayrettin Nakiboğlu	AP	
Ministry of Health and Social Security	Vedat Ali Özkan	AP	
Ministry of Agriculture	İlhami Ertem	AP	
Ministry of Village Affairs	Turhan Kapanlı	AP	
Ministry of Forestry	Hüseyin Özalp	AP	
Ministry of Transport	Nahit Menteşe; Orhan Tuğrul	AP	14 December 1970; 4 January 1971 – 26 March 1971
Ministry of Labour	Seyfi Öztürk	AP	
Ministry of Commerce	Gürkan Titrek	AP	
Ministry of Industry	Selahattin Kılıç	AP	
Ministry of Customs and Monopolies	Ahmet İhsan Birincioğlu	AP	
Ministry Tourism	Necmettin Cevheri	AP	
Ministry of Energy and Natural Resources	Sabit Osman Avcı; Nahit Menteşe	AP	6 March 1970 – 14 December 1970; 14 December 1970 – 26 March 1971
Ministry of Youth and Sports	İsmet Sezgin	AP	

== Aftermath ==
In the early 1970s, Turkey was faced with extensive urban guerrilla activities. On 12 March 1971, the army forced Demirel to resign, claiming that the government was unable to halt the terrorism. However, parliament was still functioning, so Demirel and his colleagues in the cabinet were still active as MPs.

Preceded by 31st government of Turkey (Süleyman Demirel)	32nd Government of Turkey; 06 March 1970 – 26 March 1971)	Succeeded by 33rd government of Turkey (Nihat Erim)
