= 30th government of Turkey =

Government of the Republic of Turkey (1965-1969)

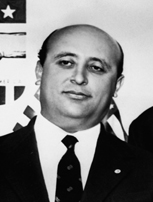
Süleyman Demirel, 1962

The 30th government of Turkey (27 October 1965 – 3 November 1969) was a government in the history of Turkey. It is also called the first Demirel government.

== Background ==
Justice Party (AP) won the elections held on 10 October 1965 by a landslide. Süleyman Demirel, the leader of AP, founded the government.

== The government ==
In the list below, the serving period of cabinet members who served only a part of the cabinet's lifespan are shown in the column "Notes". As according to the Turkish constitution of 1961, some members of the government were replaced by independent members before the elections. The members of the cabinet were as follows:

Title	Name	Party	Notes
Prime Minister	Süleyman Demirel	AP	
Minister of State
Minister of State	Cihat Bilgehan; Hüsamettin Atabeyli	AP	27 October 1965 – 3 April 1967; 3 April 1967 – 3 November 1969
Minister of State	Refet Sezgin	AP	
Minister of State	Kamil Ocak	AP	
Minister of State	Fuat Alişan; Sadık Tekin Müftüoğlu	AP	27 October 1965 – 3 April 1967; 3 April 1967 – 3 November 1969
Minister of State	Seyfi Öztürk	AP	
Ministry of Justice	Hasan Dinçer; Hidayet Aydıner	AP; Indep	27 October 1965 – 1 August 1969; 1 August 1969 – 3 November 1969
Ministry of National Defense	Ahmet Topaloğlu	AP	
Ministry of the Interior	Faruk Sükan; Ragıp Üner	AP; Indep	27 October 1965 – 1 August 1969; 1 August 1969 – 3 November 1969
Ministry of Foreign Affairs	İhsan Sabri Çağlayangil	AP	
Ministry of Finance	İhsan Gürsan; Cihat Bilgehan	AP	27 October 1965 – 2 November 1966; 14 November 1966 – 3 November 1969
Ministry of National Education	Orhan Dengiz; İlhami Ertem	AP	27 October 1965 – 3 April 1967; 3 April 1967 – 3 November 1969
Ministry of Public Works	Etem Erdinç; Orhan Alp	AP	27 October 1965 – 3 April 1967; 3 April 1967 – 3 November 1969
Ministry of Construction and Settlement	Haldun Menteşoğlu	AP	
Ministry of Health and Social Security	Sadi Somuncuoğlu; Vedat Ali Özkan	AP	27 October 1965 – 3 April 1967; 3 April 1967 – 3 November 1969
Ministry of Agriculture	Bahri Dağdaş; Ali Mesut Erez	AP	27 October 1965 – 12 August 1969; 12 August 1969 – 3 November 1969
Ministry of Village Affairs	Sabit Osman AVCI; Turgut Toker; Selahattin Kılıç	AP	27 October 1965 – 3 April 1967; 3 April 1967 – 16 December 1968; 16 December 1968 – 3 November 1969
Ministry of Forestry	Sabit Osman Avcı	AP	11 August 1969 – 3 November 1969
Ministry of Transport	Seyfi Öztürk; Sadettin Bilgiç; Mehmet İzmen	AP; AP; Indep	27 October 1965 – 3 April 1967; 3 April 1967 – 1 August 1969; 1 August 1969 – 3 November 1969
Ministry of Labour and Social Security	Ali Naili Erdem; Hayrettin Toker	AP	27 October 1965 – 6 December 1968; 16 December 1968 – 3 November 1969
Ministry of Commerce	Macit Zeren; Sadık Tekin Müftüoğlu; Ahmet Türkel	AP	27 October 1965 – 2 November 1966; 2 November 1966 – 3 April 1967; 3 April 1967 – 3 November 1969
Ministry of Industry	Mehmet Turgut	AP	
Ministry of Customs and Monopolies	İbrahim Tekin; Nahit Menteşe	AP	27 October 1965 – 10 December 1968; 10 December 1968 – 3 November 1969
Ministry Tourism	Nihat Kürşat	AP	
Ministry of Energy and Natural Resources	İbrahim Deriner; Rafet Sezgin	Indep; AP	27 October 1965 – 3 April 1967; 3 April 1967 – 3 November 1969

== Aftermath ==
The government ended because of the elections held on 12 October 1969. AP won the elections, and Süleyman Demirel founded the next government as well.

Preceded by 29th government of Turkey (Suat Hayri Ürgüplü)	30th government of Turkey; 27 October 1965 – 3 November 1969	Succeeded by 31st government of Turkey (Süleyman Demirel)
