= Orhan Alp =

Turkish politician

Ministry of Public Works
- In office 20 February 1965 – 27 October 1965
- Prime Minister: Suat Hayri Ürgüplü
- Preceded by: Arif Hikmet Onat
- Succeeded by: Ethem Erdinç

Ministry of Public Works
- In office 3 April 1967 – 3 November 1969
- Prime Minister: Süleyman Demirel
- Preceded by: Ethem Erdinç
- Succeeded by: Yaşar Gülez

Minister of Industry
- In office 5 January 1978 – 12 November 1979
- Prime Minister: Bülent Ecevit
- Preceded by: Oğuzhan Asiltürk
- Succeeded by: Kemal Bayar

Personal details
- Born: 1919 Isparta, Ottoman Empire
- Died: January 21, 2010 (aged 90–91) Ankara, Turkey
- Party: Justice Party (AP)
- Education: Mechanical engineering
- Alma mater: Technische Universität Berlin
- Occupation: Civil servant, politician
- Profession: Mechanical engineer

Orhan Alp (1919 – 21 January 2010) was a Turkish mechanical engineer, politician and former government minister.

Orhan Alp was born in Isparta, Ottoman Empire in 1919. He graduated from Technische Universität Berlin. Between 1942 and 1964 he served in the Turkish State Railways (TCDD). In 1964, he resigned from the TCDD, and briefly served in the Middle East Technical University as a lecturer.

== Political career ==
Alp joined the Justice Party (AP). Although he was not a parliament member in 1965, he was appointed as the Minister of Public Works in the 29th government of Turkey on 20 February 1965, and served until 27 October 1965. In the 1965 general election, he was elected into the 13th Parliament of Turkey as a deputy from Ankara Province. Following a government reshuffle, he was reappointed as the Minister of Public Works in the 30th government of Turkey on 3 April 1967, and served until 3 November 1969.

In the 1973 and the 1977 general elections, he was reelected into the 15th and the 16th Parliament of Turkey. But in 1977, he resigned from the Justice Party, and continued as an independent parliament member. In the 42nd government of Turkey, he served as the Minister of Industry, between 5 January 1978 and 12 November 1979.

He died in Ankara on 21 January 2010.
