= Ertuğrul Mat =

Turkish politician

MP Ertuğrul Mat
- Deputy: Grand National Assembly of Turkey 14. Term Bursa Deputy
- Parliamentary group: Justice Party (Turkey)

Personal details
- Born: 1934 (age 91–92) Istanbul

Ertuğrul Mat (1934, Istanbul) Turkish lawyer, author and Grand National Assembly of Turkey 14. Term Bursa Deputy.

== Life and career ==
He was born in 1934 in Istanbul. He graduated from Istanbul University Faculty of Law. He founded the Istanbul Democrat Party Youth Branch in 1957. After completing his military service and returning to Bursa, he joined the Justice Party.

On June 15, 1962, he started to write a daily column under the title "Days Brought" in Bursa Hâkimiyet Newspaper. He completed his internship on December 12, 1962, and started working as a lawyer. He was judged many times in Bursa High Criminal Court because of the articles he wrote. He was elected to the Provincial Assembly from Bursa Central District in the local elections of November 17, 1963. He served as a Court Clerk and Deputy chairman in this Assembly.

Although he was elected as Bursa Deputy in 1965 as a candidate for the Justice Party, he could not enter the parliament. Due to the newly implemented election system, Ömer Öztürkmen was elected instead of him. He continued to write for various newspapers. He was later elected as a member of parliament in 1969. He served as the Vice President of the Turkish Parliamentary Union for two terms.

== Bibliography ==
- Demokrasi Yolunda Karınca Misali 1. Cilt : İstanbul ve Ankara Günleri, Berikan Yayıncılık ISBN 9786059912341
- Demokrasi Yolunda Karınca Misali 2. Cilt : Bursa Günleri, Berikan Yayıncılık ISBN 9786059912365
