= Great Turkey Party =

Former Turkish political party

Great Turkey Party Büyük Türkiye Partisi
- Abbreviation: BTP
- Founder: Ali Fethi Esener
- Founded: 20 May 1983
- Dissolved: 31 May 1983
- Preceded by: Justice Party
- Succeeded by: True Path Party
- Ideology: Liberal conservatism
- Political position: Centre-right

Great Turkey Party (Turkish: Büyük Türkiye Partisi, BTP) was a short lived Turkish political party in 1983.

== Background ==
After the coup of 1980, all political parties were closed by the military rule (so called National Security Council or Turkish: MGK) regardless of their political views, on 16 October 1981. For approximately one and a half years, there were no political parties. Finally, MGK decided to allow the formation of new parties with severe restrictions. According to instructions, the new parties were not allowed to use the names of the former parties and former politicians were not allowed to be the charter member of the new parties.

== Formation of party ==
Great Turkey Party was planned by the followers of the ex Justice Party (AP) of Turkey, which was the governing party before the coup. Although Justice Party leader Süleyman Demirel was politically banned, the proposed party immediately came to be known as Demirel's party. Because some of his close friends (like Hüsamettin Cindoruk) were among the founders. Moreover, the Great Turkey phrase in the name of the party was Demirel's political slogan in his former election rallies.

The leader of the party was Fethi Esener, a retired major general. He founded the party on 21 May. Immediately two waves of ex-Justice Party MPs entered the party; first a group of 134 and then another group of 33.

== End of the party ==
BTP created sensation and it was obvious that, BTP was going to be one of the two major parties after the election. But, on 1 June, MGK closed the party. Some of the prominent party members as well as Süleyman Demirel himself were temporarily taken into custody in a camp named Zincirbozan. (Some of ex Republican People's Party (CHP) members such as Deniz Baykal were also taken into custody.)

== Aftermath ==
The next party formed by Justice Part followers was True Path Party (DYP). Although DYP was not allowed to enter the 1983 elections, it eventually became the governing party in 1991 and Süleyman Demirel became the prime minister (and later the president) of Turkey.
