= Zincirbozan =

- Locality
- Interactive map of Zincirbozan
- Coordinates: 40.4015°N 26.7530°E
- Country: Turkey
- Province: Çanakkale
- District: Lapseki

Population
  - Total: 0

Zincirbozan is a location in Çanakkale Province, Turkey, notable because of its fame as the compulsory residence of politicians in 1983.

Zincirbozan is situated in Çardak belde of Lapseki ilçe (district) facing the Sea of Marmara. Formerly there was a military establishment in Zincirbozan.

Following the 1980 Turkish coup, the military rule decided to allow the formation of new parties with severe restrictions. However, former senior politicians were not permitted to participate in the new parties. A party which was founded by the former senior politicians, i.e., Great Turkey Party was closed and any politician who was thought to disobey this rule was taken under custody in Zincirbozan. Some of this politicians were former Justice Party (AP) and some were former Republican People's Party (CHP) members.

AP members were; Suleyman Demirel (former prime minister), İhsan Sabri Çağlayangil (former speaker of the upper house), Hüsamettin Cindoruk, Nahit Menteşe, Ali Naili Erdem, Ekrem Ceyhun, Saadettin Bilgiç, Yiğit Köker, and Mehmet Gölhan

CHP Members were Sırrı Atalay (former speaker of the parliament), Deniz Baykal, Süleyman Genç, Metin Tüzün, Celal Doğan, Ferhat Altıntaş, and Yüksel Çakmur. Their compulsory residence, continued between 1 June 1983 – 30 September 1983

== Aftermath ==
In later years some of these names continued in politics. For example, Süleyman Demirel became the chairman of True Path Party (1987) and prime minister . Later he was elected as the President of Turkey (1993). Deniz Baykal became the chairman of CHP (1992) and vice prime minister (1995), Hüsamettin Cindoruk became the chairman of True Path Party (1985) and the speaker of the parliament (1992).

== Film ==
In 2007 a film named Zincirbozan was released. Its screenplay was by Avni Özgürel and was directed by Atıl İnaç. The actors were by Bülent Emin Yarar, Suavi Eren and Haldun Boysan.
