= Seyfi Öztürk =

Turkish lawyer and politician (1927–2002)

Personal details
- Born: 1927 Eskişehir, Turkey
- Died: 5 November 2002 (aged 74–75) İstanbul, Turkey
- Resting place: Eskişehir, Turkey
- Party: Republican Villagers Nation Party; Justice Party; True Path Party
- Education: Ankara University
- Occupation: Lawyer

Seyfi Öztürk (1927–2002) was a Turkish lawyer and politician who held several cabinet posts in the 1960s and 1970s. He was a long-term member of the Parliament first for the Republican Villagers Nation Party and then for the Justice Party.

== Early life and education ==
He was born in Eskişehir in 1927. He graduated from Ankara University obtaining a degree in law.

== Career and activities ==
Following his graduation Öztürk worked as a lawyer. His political career began after the military coup in 1960. He was a member of the Constituent Assembly of Turkey in 1961 representing the Republican Villagers Nation Party. He was elected as a deputy from Eskişehir for five terms between 1961 and 1980. He became one of the members of the general administrative board of the Republican Villagers Nation Party in August 1965.

Öztürk was named as the minister of village affairs in 1965 to the cabinet led by Prime Minister Suat Hayri Ürgüplü. While serving as minister Öztürk resigned from the Republican Villagers Nation Party and joined the Justice Party. The reason for his resignation was his opposition to Alparslan Türkeş, a former military officer who was one of the leading figures of the 1960 military coup, since Türkeş was elected as the chairman of the Republican Villagers Nation Party. In addition, Öztürk and Hasan Dinçer, minister of defense and a member of the Republican Villagers Nation Party, were forced to resign from their ministerial posts due to the opposition of Türkeş. Mustafa Kepir succeeded Öztürk as minister of village affairs.

Öztürk was the minister of transportation to the first cabinet of Süleyman Demirel between 1965 and 1967. He later served as the minister of state in the same cabinet between 1967 and 1969. He was the minister of labour in the second cabinet led by Demirel between 3 November 1969 and 6 March 1970. Öztürk held the same post in the third cabinet of Demirel from 1970 and 1971. During his term as minister of labour Öztürk visited West Germany in August 1970 to discuss the status of illegal Turkish migrants in the country. He informed the West German authorities about the pathways used by them stating that they mostly entered to the country from East Berlin.

Öztürk was appointed minister of state to the coalition government led by again Süleyman Demirel on 31 March 1975. Öztürk was again appointed minister of state on 21 July 1977 when a new coalition government was formed by Demirel. Öztürk joined the True Path Party in 1983 after the closure of the Justice Party in 1980.

== Death ==
Öztürk died in İstanbul on 5 November 2002 and was buried in his hometown, Eskişehir, next day.
