= 14th government of Turkey =

Government of the Republic of Turkey (1943-1946)

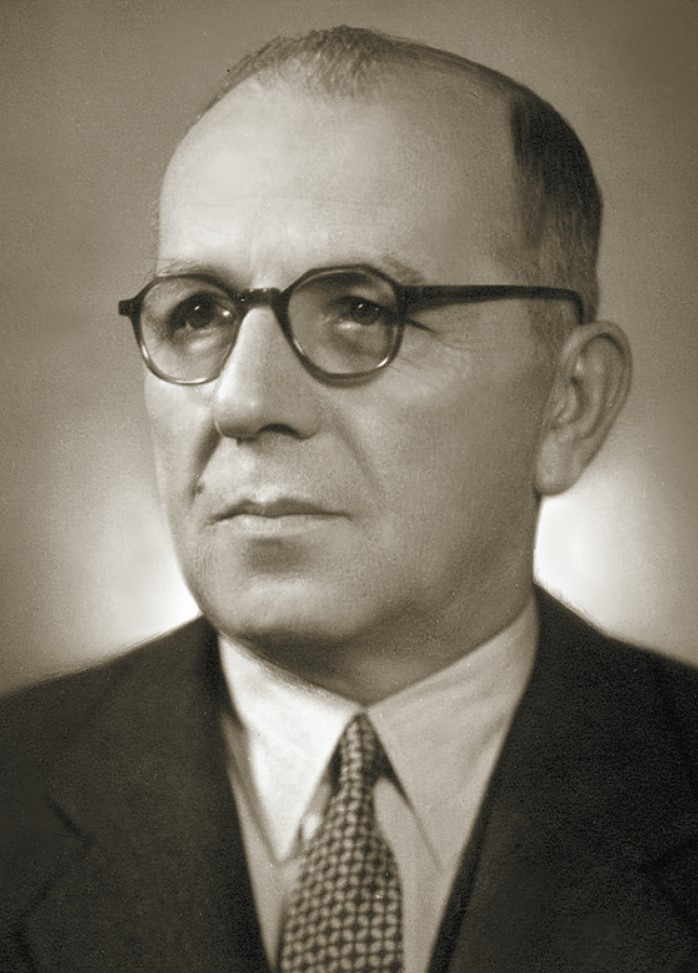
Şükrü Saracoğlu

The 14th government of Turkey (9 March 1943 – 7 August 1946) was a government in the history of Turkey. It is also called second Saracoğlu government.

== Background ==
The government was formed after the general elections held on 28 February 1943. Şükrü Saracoğlu of Republican People's Party (CHP), who was also the prime minister of the previous government, was appointed as the prime minister.

== The government ==
In the list below, the cabinet members who served only a part of the cabinet's lifespan are shown in the column "Notes".

Title	Name	Notes
Prime Minister	Şükrü Saracoğlu	
Ministry of Justice	Ali Rıza Türel; Mümtaz Ökmen	9 March 1943 – 6 April 1946; 6 April 1946 – 7 August 1946
Ministry of National Defense	Ali Rıza Artunkal	
Ministry of the Interior	Recep Peker; Hilmi Uran	9 March 1943 – 20 May 1943; 20 May 1943 – 7 August 1946
Ministry of Foreign Affairs	Numan Menemencioğlu; Hasan Saka	9 March 1943 – 16 June 1944; 13 September 1944 – 7 August 1946
Ministry of Finance	Fuat Ağralı; Nurullah Esat Sümer	9 March 1943 – 13 September 1944; 13 September 1944 – 7 August 1946
Ministry of National Education	Hasan Âli Yücel	
Ministry of Public Works	Sırrı Day	
Ministry of Health and Social Security	Hulusi Alataş; Sadi Konuk	9 March 1943 – 18 January 1945; 18 January 1945 – 7 August 1946
Ministry of Customs and Monopolies	Suat Hayri Ürgüplü; Tahsin Coşkan	9 March 1943 – 13 February 1946; 19 February 1946 – 7 August 1946
Ministry of Transport	Ali Fuat Cebesoy	
Ministry of Economy	Fuat Sirmen	
Ministry of Commerce	Calal Sait Siren; Raif Karadeniz	9 March 1943 – 31 May 1945; 31 May 1945 – 7 August 1946
Ministry of Agriculture	Raşit Şevket Hatiboğlu	
Ministry of Labour	Sadi Irmak	

== Aftermath ==
The government ended after the general elections held on 21 July 1946. Although his party won the elections, Saracoğlu retired from active politics due to health problems.

Preceded by 13th government of Turkey (Şükrü Saracoğlu)	14th Government of Turkey; 9.March 1943 – 7 August 1946	Succeeded by 15th government of Turkey (Recep Peker)
