= 41st government of Turkey =

Government of the Republic of Turkey (1977-1978)

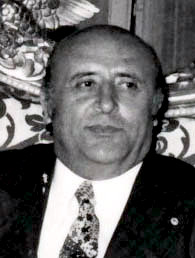
Süleyman Demirel, 1976

The 41st government of Turkey (21 July 1977 – 5 January 1978) was a historical government of Turkey. It is also called the fifth Demirel cabinet and Second Nationalist Front.

== Background ==
After the 40th government failed to receive the vote of confidence, three parties formed a coalition and named their government the "Second Nationalist Front." The prime minister was Süleyman Demirel, the leader of Justice Party (AP). Other partners were National Salvation Party (MSP) and Nationalist Movement Party (MHP). The difference between the first and the second nationalistic fronts was that Republican Reliance Party (CGP) was no longer a partner of the coalition.

== The government ==
In the list below, the serving period of cabinet members who served only a part of the cabinet's lifespan are shown in the column "Notes".

Title	Name	Party	Notes
Prime Minister	Süleyman Demirel	AP	
Deputy Prime Minister
Deputy Prime Minister	Necmettin Erbakan	MSP	
Deputy Prime Minister	Alparslan Türkeş	MHP	
Minister of State
Minister of State	Seyfi Öztürk	AP	
Minister of State	Süleyman Arif Emre	MSP	
Minister of State	Sadi Somuncuoğu	MHP	
Minister of State	Ali Şevki Erek; Ekrem Ceyhun	AP	21 July 1977 – 1 November 1977; 11 November 1977 – 5 January 1978
Ministry of Justice	Necmettin Cevheri	AP	
Ministry of National Defense	Sadettin Bilgiç; Turhan Kapanlı	AP	
Ministry of the Interior	Korkut Özal	MSP	
Ministry of Foreign Affairs	İhsan Sabri Çağlayangil	AP	
Ministry of Finance	Cihat Bilgehan	AP	
Ministry of National Education	Nahit Menteşe	AP	
Ministry of Public Works	Selahattin Kılıç	AP	
Ministry of Commerce	Agah Oktay Güner	MHP	
Ministry of Health and Social Security	Cengiz Gökçek	MHP	
Ministry of Customs and Monopolies	Gün Sazak	MHP	
Ministry Food, Agriculture and Animal Husbandry	Fehim Adak	MSP	
Ministry of Transport	Yılmaz Ergenekon	AP	
Ministry of Labour	Fehmi Cumalıoğlu	MSP	
Ministry of Social Security	Turhan Kapanlıı; İlhami Ertem	AP	21 July 1977 – 28 October 1977; 12 November 1977 – 5 January 1978
Ministry of Industry and Technology	Oğuzhan Asiltürk	MSP	
Ministry Tourism	İskender Cenap Ege	AP	
Ministry Culture	Avni Akyol	AP	
Ministry of Construction and Settlement	Recai Kutan	MSP	
Ministry of Energy and Natural Resources	Kamran İnan	AP	
Ministry of Village Affairs and Cooperatives	Turgut Yücel	AP	
Ministry of Forestry	Sabahattin Savcı	MSP	
Ministry of Youth and Sports	Önal Şakar; Ali Şevki Erek	AP	21 July 1977 – 14 October 1977; 1 November 1977 – 5 January 1978

== Aftermath ==
The government was short-lived. The Republican People's Party overthrew the government by interpellation.

Preceded by 40th government of Turkey (Bülent Ecevit)	41st Government of Turkey; 21 July 1977 – 5 January 1978	Succeeded by 42nd government of Turkey (Bülent Ecevit)
