= Ali Mesut Erez =

Turkish economist and politician (1922–2011)

Personal details
- Born: 1 July 1922 Kütahya, Ottoman Empire
- Died: 6 February 2011 (aged 88) Çavuş Çiftliği, Kütahya, Turkey
- Resting place: Çavuş Çiftliği, Kütahya, Turkey
- Party: Justice Party
- Children: 2
- Education: Ankara University

Ali Mesut Erez (1922–2011) was a Turkish politician who held various cabinet posts, such as minister of finance. He was a member of the Justice Party and served as a member of the Parliament between 1965 and 1973. After retiring from politics he was involved in business.

== Early life and education ==
He was born in Kütahya on 1 July 1922. He graduated from Kütahya High School im 1940. He received a degree from the Faculty of Political Science, Ankara University in 1944. He also obtained a degree in law from Ankara University.

== Career and activities ==
Erez joined at the Ministry of Finance where he first worked in the Finance Inspection Board from 14 June 1945. He was appointed head of the Revenue Board of Istanbul 1961. He was named as the head of the General Directorate of Revenues in 1963.

Erez's political career began in 1965 when he was elected a deputy for the Justice Party representing his hometown, Kütahya. He was appointed minister of agriculture on 12 August 1969 and remained in office until 3 November 1969. He was reelected as a deputy in 1969 and was named as the minister of finance in November 1969. His tenure ended in March 1971. He was appointed minister of state and deputy prime minister on 2 December 1971. He was made minister of industry and technology on 11 December 1971 when a new cabinet formed.

Erez retired from politics in 1973 and began to work in private sector. He served as the chairman of the Union of Cement Industry Employers from 1979 to 2001. He was the president of the Chamber of Industry Council in Eskişehir between 1979 and September 2000.

== Later years, personal life and death ==
Erez had a good command of French. He was married and had two children.

Erez died in Çavuş Çiftliği village, Kütahya, on 6 February 2011 and was buried there next day.
