= 29th government of Turkey =

Government of the Republic of Turkey (1965)

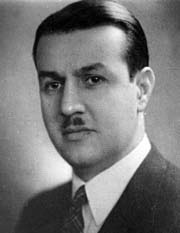
Suat Hayri Ürgüplü

The 29th government of Turkey (20 February 1965 – 27 October 1965) was a caretaker government in Turkey. The prime minister was Suat Hayri Ürgüplü, an Justice Party (AP) member. Four parties supported him: Justice Party (AP), New Turkey Party (YTP), Republican Villagers Nation Party (CKMP), and Nation Party (MP). (This was the only time Nation Party ever participated in a government).

== The government ==
Some of the cabinet members were changed during the lifespan of the cabinet. In the list below, the serving period of cabinet members who served only a part of the cabinet's lifespan are shown in the column "Notes".

Title	Name	Party	Notes
Prime Minister	Suat Hayri Ürgüplü	AP	
Deputy Prime Minister	Süleyman Demirel	AP	
Minister of State
Minister of State	Hayati Ataman	MP	
Minister of State	Mehmet Altınsoy	CKMP	
Minister of State	Şekip İnal	YTP	
Ministry of Justice
Ministry of Justice	İrfan Baran	CKMP	20 February 1965 – 31 July 1965
Ministry of Justice	Hayati Köknel	Indep	31 July 1965 – 27 October 1965
Ministry of National Defense
Ministry of National Defense	Hasan Dinçer	CKMP	20 February 1965 – 10 August 1965
Ministry of National Defense	Hazım Dağlı	CKMP	10 August 1965 – 27 October 1965
Ministry of the Interior
Ministry of the Interior	İsmail Hakkı Akdoğan	MP	
Ministry of the Interior	İzzet Gencer	Indep	
Ministry of Foreign Affairs	Hasan Esat Işık	Indep	
Ministry of Finance	İhsan Gürsan	AP	
Ministry of National Education	Cihat Bilgehan	AP	
Ministry of Public Works	Orhan Alp	Indep	
Ministry of Monopolies	Ahmet Topaloğlu	AP	
Ministry of Commerce	Macit Zeren	AP	
Ministry of Health and Social Security	Faruk Sükan	AP	
Ministry of Agriculture	Turhan Kapanlı	YTP	
Ministry of Construction and Settlement	Recai İskenderoğlu	YTP	
Ministry of Transport
Ministry of Transport	Mithat San	YTP	20 February 1965 – 31 July 1965
Ministry of Transport	Kazım Yurdakul	Indep	31 July 1965 – 27 October 1965
Ministry of Industry	Ali Naili Erdem	AP	
Ministry of Tourism
Ministry of Tourism	Ömer Zekai Dorman	MP	20 February 1965 – 28 August 1965
Ministry of Tourism	İsmail Hakkı Akdoğan	MP	28 August 1965 – 27 October 1965
Ministry of Village Affairs
Ministry of Village Affairs	Seyfi Öztürk	CKMP	20 February 1965 – 10 August 1965
Ministry of Village Affairs	Mustafa Kepir	CKMP	10 August 1965 – 27 October 1965
Ministry of Labour and Social Security	İhsan Sabri Çağlayangil	AP	
Ministry of Energy and Natural Resources	Mehmet Turgut	AP	

== Aftermath ==
The government resigned after the elections held on 10 October 1965, which the Justice Party won by a landslide. The 29th government was succeeded by the government of Süleyman Demirel.

Preceded by 28th government of Turkey (İsmet İnönü)	29th Government of Turkey; 20 February 1965 – 27 October 1965	Succeeded by 30th government of Turkey (Süleyman Demirel)
