= 16th government of Turkey =

Government of the Republic of Turkey (1947-1948)

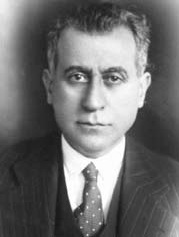
Hasan Saka

The 16th government of Turkey (10 September 1947 – 10 June 1948) was a government in the history of Turkey. It is also called the first Saka government.

== Background ==
Recep Peker of the Republican People's Party (CHP), who was the previous prime minister, resigned on 9 September 1947 after a harsh discussions in the parliament. İsmet İnönü, the president, assigned Hasan Saka, a more moderate politician, as the prime minister. Saka's government was, however, similar to that of Peker.

== The government ==
In the list below, the cabinet members who served only a part of the cabinet's lifespan are shown in the column "Notes".

Title	Name	Notes
Prime Minister	Hasan Saka	
Deputy Prime Minister	Faik Ahmet Barutçu	
Minister of State	Abdülhalik Renda	
Ministry of Justice	Şinasi Devrin	
Ministry of National Defense and Navy	Münir Birsel	
Ministry of the Interior	Münir Hüsrev Göle	
Ministry of Foreign Affairs	Necmettin Sadak	
Ministry of Finance	Nazmi Keşmir; Şevket Adalan	10 September 1947 – 23 March 1948; 27 March 1948 – 10 June 1948
Ministry of National Education	Şemsettin Sirer	
Ministry of Public Works	Kasım Gülek	
Ministry of Health and Social Security	Behçet Uz	
Ministry of Customs and Monopolies	Şevket Adalan	
Ministry of Economy	Cavit Ekin	
Ministry of Agriculture	Tahsin Coşkan	
Ministry of Transport	Şükrü Koçak	
Ministry of Commerce	Nedim Gündüzalp	
Ministry of Labour	Bekir Balta	

== Aftermath ==
Saka was criticized as too mild to struggle against the Democrat Party opposition. He resigned on 8 July 1948. However, ten days later, he founded his second government.

Preceded by 15th government of Turkey (Recep Peker)	16th Government of Turkey; 10 September 1947 – 10 June 1948	Succeeded by 17th government of Turkey (Hasan Saka)
