= 15th government of Turkey =

Government of the Republic of Turkey (1946-1947)

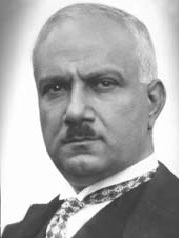
Recep Peker

The 15th government of Turkey (7 August 1946 – 10 September 1947) was a government in the history of Turkey. It is also called the Peker government.

== Background ==
Although Republican People's Party (CHP) won the elections held on 21 July, prime minister Şükrü Saracoğlu of CHP announced that he would not continue for another term of premiership due to health problems. Recep Peker, who was the Minister of Interior in Saracoğlu government, was assigned to form the government.

== The government ==
In the list below, the cabinet members who served only a part of the cabinet's lifespan are shown in the column "Notes".

Title	Name	Notes
Prime Minister	Recep Peker	
Deputy Prime Minister	Mümtaz Ökmen	19 September 1946 – 10 September 1947
Minister of State	Abdülhalik Renda	
Ministry of Justice	Mümtaz Ökmen; Şinasi Devrin	7 August 1946 – 19 September 1946; 19 September 1946 – 10 September 1947
Ministry of National Defense and Navy	Cemil Cahit Toydemir; Münir Birsel	7 August 1946 – 5 September 1947; 5 September 1947 – 10 September 1947
Ministry of the Interior	Şükrü Sökmensüer; Hüsrev Göle	7 August 1946 – 5 September 1947; 5 September 1947 – 10 September 1947
Ministry of Foreign Affairs	Hasan Saka	
Ministry of Finance	Nazmi Keşmir	
Ministry of National Education	Şemsettin Sirer	
Ministry of Public Works	Kerim İncedayı	
Ministry of Health and Social Security	Behçet Uz	
Ministry of Customs and Monopolies	Tahsin Coşkan	
Ministry of Economy	Bekir Balta; Cavit Ekin	7 August 1946 – 5 September 1947; 5 September 1947 – 10 September 1947
Ministry of Agriculture	Faik Kurdoğlu; Şevket Adalan	7 August 1946 – 5 September 1947; 5 September 1947 – 10 September 1947
Ministry of Transport	Şükrü Koçak	
Ministry of Commerce	Atıf İnan	
Ministry of Labour	Sadi Irmak; Bekir Balta	7 August 1946 – 5 September 1947; 5 September 1947 – 10 September 1947

== Aftermath ==
Following a harsh discussions in the parliament between Recep Peker and Adnan Menderes of the Democrat Party, Recep Peker resigned.

Preceded by 14th government of Turkey (Şükrü Saracoğlu)	15th Government of Turkey; 7 August 1946 – 10 September 1947	Succeeded by 16th government of Turkey (Hasan Saka)
