= 1969 Turkish general election =

Election in Turkey

- 12 October 1969

450 seats in the Grand National Assembly 226 seats needed for a majority
- Turnout: 64.35% (▼6.91pp)
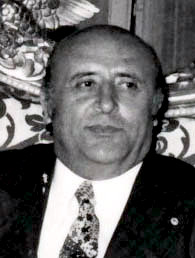

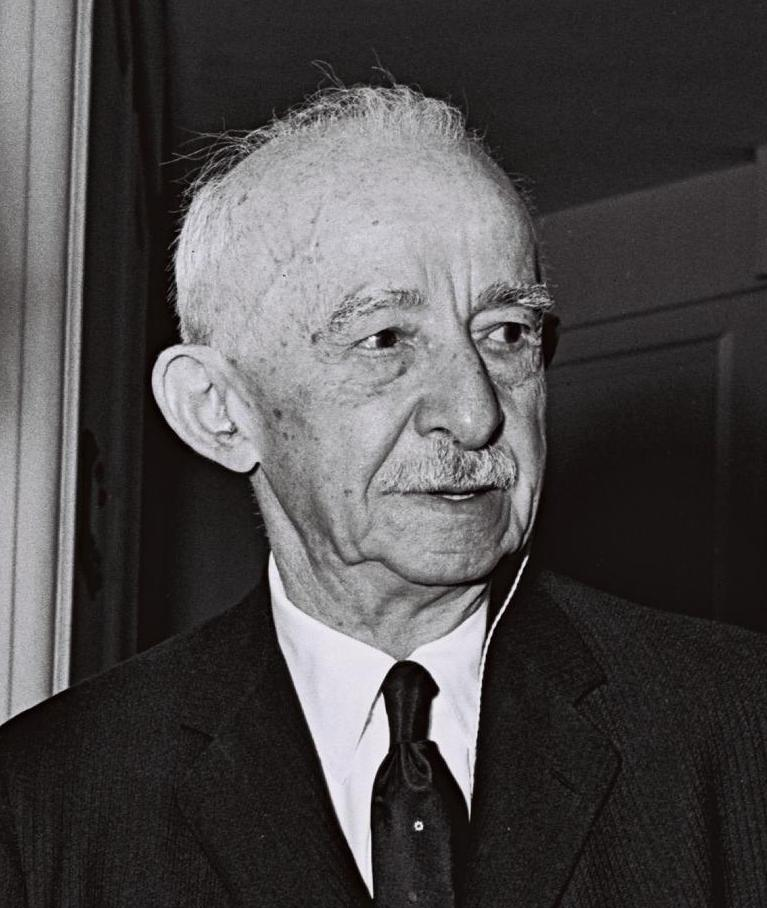
	First party	Second party
Leader	Süleyman Demirel	İsmet İnönü
Party	AP	CHP
Leader since	28 November 1964	10 November 1938
Leader's seat	Isparta	Malatya
Last election	52.87%, 240 seats	28.75%, 134 seats
Seats won	256	143
Seat change	▲16	▲9
Popular vote	4,229,712	2,487,006
Percentage	46.53%	27.36%
Swing	▼6.34pp	▼1.39pp
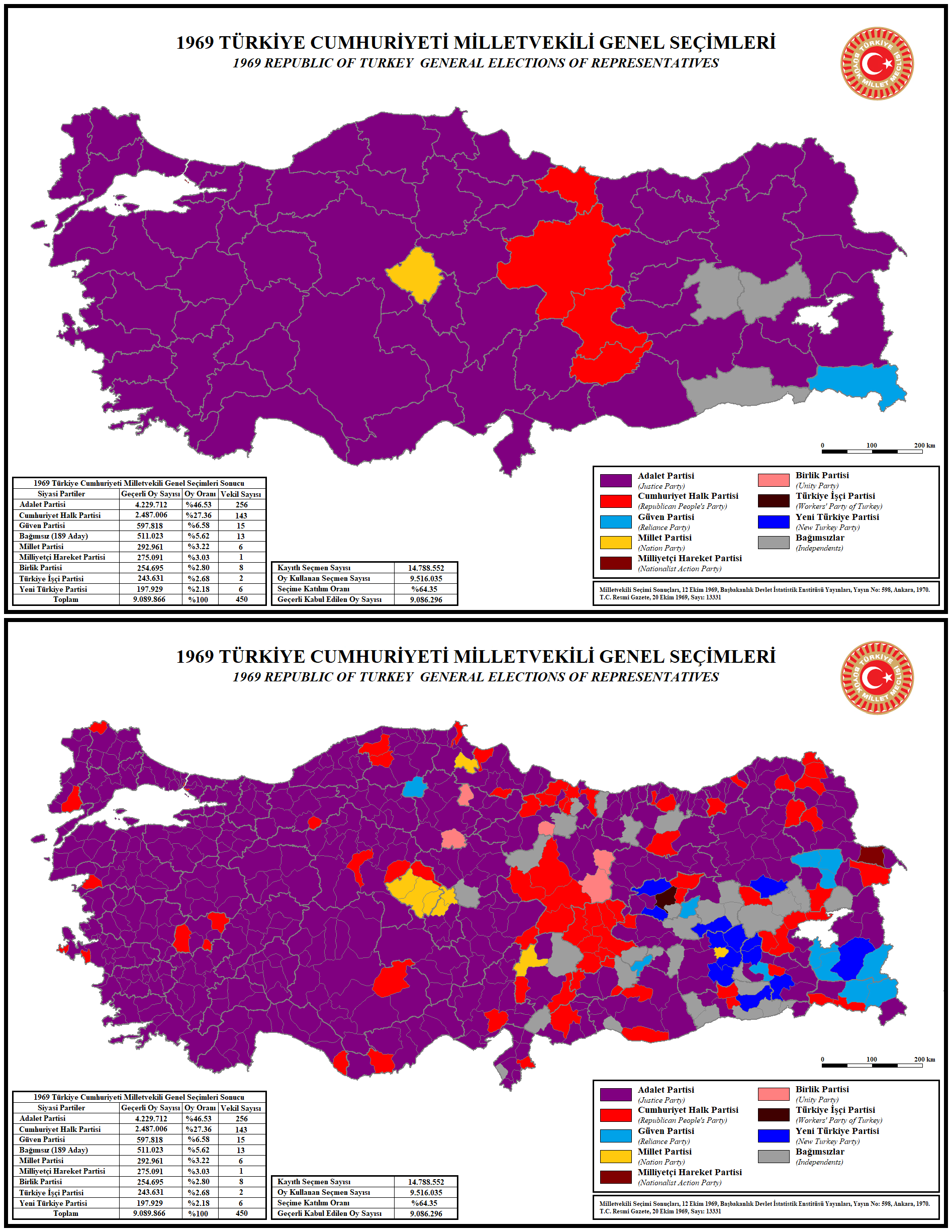

Prime Minister before election
Süleyman Demirel
AP
Elected Prime Minister
Süleyman Demirel
AP

General elections were held in Turkey on 12 October 1969. The electoral system used was party-list proportional representation using the D'Hondt method in 66 electoral districts. The result was a victory for the Justice Party, which won 256 of the 450 seats. Voter turnout was 64.3%.

== Results ==
Party	Votes	%	Seats	+/–
Justice Party	4,229,712	46.53	256	+16
Republican People's Party	2,487,006	27.36	143	+9
Reliance Party	597,818	6.58	15	New
Nation Party	292,961	3.22	6	–25
Nationalist Movement Party	275,091	3.03	1	–10
Unity Party	254,695	2.80	8	New
Workers' Party	243,631	2.68	2	–12
New Turkey Party	197,929	2.18	6	–13
Independents	511,023	5.62	13	+12
Total	9,089,866	100.00	450	0
Valid votes	9,086,296	95.48		
Invalid/blank votes	429,739	4.52		
Total votes	9,516,035	100.00		
Registered voters/turnout	14,788,552	64.35		
Source: Nohlen et al.
