= Suat Hayri Ürgüplü =

11th Prime Minister of the Republic of Turkey from February 1965 to October 1965

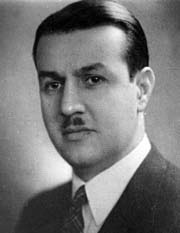
- Ürgüplü in 1939

11th Prime Minister of Turkey
- In office 20 February 1965 – 27 October 1965
- President: Cemal Gürsel
- Deputy: Süleyman Demirel
- Preceded by: İsmet İnönü
- Succeeded by: Süleyman Demirel

President of the Senate of Turkey
- In office 28 October 1961 – 6 November 1963
- Preceded by: Office established
- Succeeded by: Enver Aka

Member of the Grand National Assembly
- In office 14 May 1950 – 1952
- In office 26 March 1939 – 21 July 1946
- Constituency: Kayseri (1939, 1943, 1950)

Personal details
- Born: 13 August 1903 Damascus, Sanjak of Damascus, Syria Vilayet, Ottoman Empire
- Died: 26 December 1981 (aged 78) Istanbul, Turkey
- Party: Justice Party
- Spouse: Zeynep Nigar Ürgüplü (m. 1932)
- Education: Galatasaray High School
- Alma mater: Istanbul University Law School

Ali Suat Hayri Ürgüplü (13 August 1903 – 26 December 1981) was a Turkish politician who served a brief term as Prime Minister of Turkey in 1965. He was also the last Prime Minister to be born outside the territory of present-day Turkey, being born in Damascus, which was then part of the Ottoman Empire.

== Early life ==
Ürgüplü graduated from Galatasaray High School. He was the descendant of a distinguished line of Ottoman religious scholars and administrators. His father was the celebrated Sheikh ul-Islam Ürgüplü Hayri Efendi, Minister of Religious Affairs under the Committee of Union and Progress (or Young Turk) regime of 1913–1918.

== Career ==
After a brief career as a judge, Ürgüplü entered the Turkish Parliament in 1939 and served as Minister of Customs and Public Monopolies in the Şükrü Saracoğlu cabinet in 1947–1948. He returned to the Senate of Turkey in 1961 and was its chairman from 27 November 1963 to 6 November 1963. Ürgüplü was asked to form a non-partisan caretaker cabinet after the collapse of Prime Minister İsmet İnönü's coalition government in 1965. The cabinet was formed on 5 February, and served until the parliamentary elections of 10 October, although it never received a vote of confidence in Parliament. Ürgüplü continued to serve in the Senate until 1972.

== Death ==
Ürgüplü died on 27 December 1981 in Istanbul and was interred at the Edirnekapı Martyr's Cemetery.

== Issue ==
His son, Hayri Ürgüplü (born 31 May 1936), married Princess Sabiha Fazile Ibrahim Hanımsultan of Egypt in Paris, France, on 10 April 1965. The couple had two sons: Ali Suad Ürgüplü (born 28 September 1967) and Mehmed Selim Ürgüplü (born 31 October 1968). The couple divorced on 24 September 1980.

Political offices
Preceded by İsmet İnönü	Prime Minister of Turkey; 20 Feb 1965–27 Oct 1965	Succeeded by Süleyman Demirel
