= Süleyman Demirel =

President of Turkey from 1993 to 2000

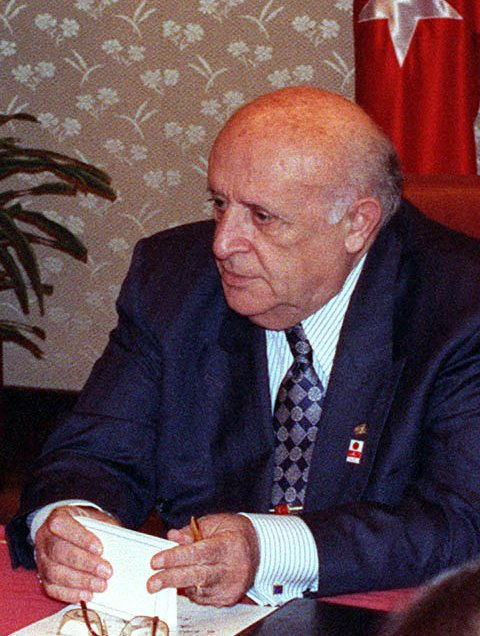
- Demirel in 1998

9th President of Turkey
- In office 16 May 1993 – 16 May 2000
- Prime Minister: Tansu Çiller; Mesut Yılmaz; Necmettin Erbakan; Bülent Ecevit
- Preceded by: Turgut Özal; Hüsamettin Cindoruk (acting)
- Succeeded by: Ahmet Necdet Sezer

12th Prime Minister of Turkey
- In office 20 November 1991 – 16 May 1993
- President: Turgut Özal
- Deputy: Erdal İnönü
- Preceded by: Mesut Yılmaz
- Succeeded by: Erdal İnönü (acting)
- In office 12 November 1979 – 12 September 1980
- President: Fahri Korutürk
- Preceded by: Bülent Ecevit
- Succeeded by: Bülend Ulusu
- In office 21 July 1977 – 5 January 1978
- President: Fahri Korutürk
- Deputy: Necmettin Erbakan; Alparslan Türkeş
- Preceded by: Bülent Ecevit
- Succeeded by: Bülent Ecevit
- In office 31 March 1975 – 21 June 1977
- President: Fahri Korutürk
- Deputy: Necmettin Erbakan; Turhan Feyzioğlu; Alparslan Türkeş
- Preceded by: Sadi Irmak
- Succeeded by: Bülent Ecevit
- In office 21 October 1965 – 16 March 1971
- President: Cemal Gürsel; Cevdet Sunay
- Preceded by: Suat Hayri Ürgüplü
- Succeeded by: Nihat Erim

Deputy Prime Minister of Turkey
- In office 20 February 1965 – 21 October 1965
- Prime Minister: Suat Hayri Ürgüplü
- Preceded by: Kemal Satır
- Succeeded by: Atilla Karaosmanoğlu; Sadi Koçaş (1971)

Leader of the True Path Party
- In office 24 September 1987 – 16 May 1993
- Preceded by: Hüsamettin Cindoruk
- Succeeded by: Tansu Çiller

Leader of the Justice Party
- In office 28 November 1964 – 16 October 1981
- Preceded by: Ragıp Gümüşpala
- Succeeded by: Party abolished

Member of the Grand National Assembly
- In office 29 November 1987 – 16 May 1993
- Constituency: Isparta (1987, 1991)
- In office 10 October 1965 – 12 September 1980
- Constituency: Isparta (1965, 1969, 1973, 1977)

Personal details
- Born: 1 November 1924 Atabey, Turkey
- Died: 17 June 2015 (aged 90) Ankara, Turkey
- Resting place: Süleyman Demirel Memorial Tomb, Atabey
- Party: Justice Party (1964–1981); True Path Party (1987–1993)
- Spouse: Nazmiye Demirel (m. 1948; died 2013)
- Education: Istanbul Technical University
- Profession: Civil engineer

Süleyman Sami Demirel (Note: Turkish pronunciation: [sylejˈman deˈmiɾæl]) (1 November 1924 – 17 June 2015) was a Turkish politician, engineer, and statesman who served as the president of Turkey from 1993 to 2000. He previously served as the prime minister of Turkey seven times between 1965 and 1993. He was the leader of the Justice Party (AP) from 1964 to 1980 and the leader of the True Path Party (DYP) from 1987 to 1993.

Having been identified as a potential future prime minister by Adnan Menderes, Demirel was elected leader of the Justice Party in 1964 and managed to bring down the government of İsmet İnönü in 1965 despite not being a Member of Parliament. He supported the government of Suat Hayri Ürgüplü until his party won a parliamentary majority in 1965. He became the first prime minister born in the Republic of Turkey. Claiming that his Justice Party was the successor of the banned Democrat Party, he was re-elected as premier in 1969 by winning a parliamentary majority for a second time. Despite his economic reforms which stabilised inflation, he resigned after his budget was blocked by parliament, but formed his third government shortly after. His premiership came to an end following the 1971 Turkish coup d'état.

Demirel was the leader of the opposition from 1971 to 1975 before forming a right-wing government known as the First Nationalist Front, which collapsed in 1977. He formed the Second Nationalist Front cabinet in 1977, which collapsed in 1978. Demirel's minority government in 1979 was unable to elect a president in 1980, leading to the 1980 Turkish coup d'état which banned Demirel from politics. Returning to politics in 1987, he assumed the leadership of the True Path Party. He won the 1991 general election and formed a coalition with the Social Democratic Populist Party (SHP), assuming his fifth and final term as prime minister. Following the sudden death of serving President Turgut Özal, Demirel contested the 1993 presidential election and subsequently became the ninth President of Turkey until 2000. With 10 years and 5 months, his tenure as premier is the third longest in Turkish history, after İsmet İnönü and Recep Tayyip Erdoğan.

== Family ==
Süleyman Demirel was born on 1 November 1924, İslamköy, Atabey, a town in Isparta Province to Hacı Yahya Demirel (1894–1972) and Hacı Ümmühan Demirel (1902–1979).

He was a shepherd in his childhood, which set him apart from the traditional political elite of the country, usually from the military-bureaucratic or the landowning elite, something Demirel used for his public image: because of his rise from a humble background, the rural masses in particular admired him. These conservative masses further identified with him when he projected the image of a proud Muslim, reminding the public that his father did the Hajj, that in his home, the Qur'an was read on a daily basis when he was a child, or that the name of his village, "İslamköy", means "village of Islam".

Upon completing elementary school in his hometown, he attended middle and high schools in Isparta, Muğla, and Afyon. In 1948, he married Nazmiye Şener, his second cousin.

== Engineering career ==
After graduating from the school of civil engineering at the Istanbul Technical University in 1949, Süleyman Demirel worked in the State Department for electrical power planning. He undertook postgraduate studies on irrigation, electrical technologies, and dam construction in the United States, first in 1949–1950, then in 1954–1955. During the construction of the Seyhan Dam, Demirel worked as a project engineer and in 1954 was appointed director of the Department of Dams. In 1955, he served as director general of the State Hydraulic Works (DSİ). As such, Demirel supervised the construction of a various power plants, dams and irrigation facilities. Eisenhower Fellowships selected Süleyman Demirel in 1954 to represent Turkey.

After the coup d'état in 1960, he was drafted to the Turkish Army for compulsory military service. Upon completion of his military service, he worked as a freelance engineer and a representative of the Morrison Construction Company, a U.S. company. During this period, he also worked as a part-time lecturer of hydraulic engineering at the Middle East Technical University (ODTÜ) in Ankara.

== Entry to politics ==
His political career started with his election to the executive board of the Justice Party, founded by the former general Ragıp Gümüşpala as a replacement of the Democrat Party that was banned after the military coup of 27 May 1960. Journalist and MP Cihat Baban claims in The Gallery of Politics (Politika Galerisi), that President Cemal Gürsel told him:

We may solve all troubles if Süleyman Demirel can become the head of the Justice Party (Adalet Partisi). I am working very hard for him to become the party leader. If I succeed in this, I will be happy.

Demirel's rural, central Anatolian accent and the fact that he came from a village from the countryside made him very appealing to rural voters.

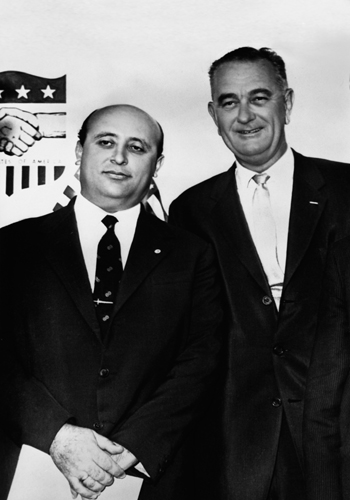
U.S. Vice President Lyndon Johnson and Süleyman Demirel at a ceremony honoring the United States Agency for International Development (28 August 1962)

On 22 March 1963, the imprisoned former president Celal Bayar was released on parole, causing protests in front of Justice Party headquarters. Demirel resigned from his position during the ordeal, and claimed that "There wouldn't be democracy in this country for another 50 years". He remained politically inactive until the death of Ragıp Gümüşpala in June 1964 when he re-entered politics as a candidate for chairman of the party. However, Demirel faced strong opposition. His biggest rival was Sadettin Bilgiç, nicknamed "koca reis" (Turkish: "big captain"). Bilgiç supporters accused Demirel of being a freemason; While this was true, Demirel averted the crisis with a lie. Instead of writing to his own lodge, he petitioned a separate freemason's lodge asking whether he was a member or not. As expected, the lodge chairman answered negatively. This turned the tide in Demirel's favor, and he received enough votes to become the chairman of the Justice Party, receiving 1,072 votes to Bilgiç's 552, and Tekin Arıburun's 39.

Demirel was elected chairman at the second grand party convention on 28 November 1964. He facilitated the formation of a caretaker government that ruled between February and October 1965 under the premiership of Suat Hayri Ürgüplü in which he served as Deputy Prime Minister. Under his leadership, the Justice Party won an unprecedented majority of the votes in the 1965 general election and formed a majority government. Demirel thus became the youngest-ever Prime Minister in Turkish history at the age of 40.

== First premiership ==
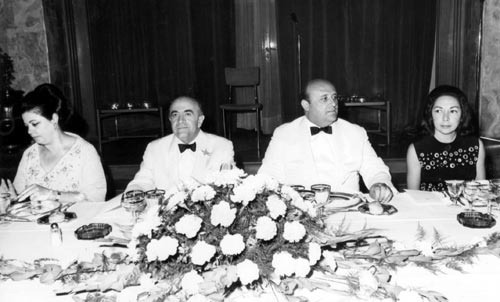
Prime Minister of Iran Amir-Abbas Hoveida and Demirel, Tehran c. 1970

Demirel was one of the first of a new generation born in the 1920s that were now entering politics known as the "Republican Generation", during which heroes of the Turkish War of Independence such as İsmet İnönü, Celâl Bayar and Ragıp Gümüşpala were gradually withdrawing from politics.

Shortly after coming to power he faced was the "Presidential crisis" when Cemal Gürsel, who assumed the presidency after the adoption of the 1961 Constitution, stated that his poor health prevented him from continuing his duty. Demirel nominated the Chief of the General Staff, Cevdet Sunay for the presidency in order to soften the army's attitude towards the Justice Party, who became president in 1966.

In the next elections on 10 October 1969, his party was the sole winner by a landslide once again. Demirel presided over laying the foundations of the Keban Dam, the Bosphorus Bridge and an oil pipeline between Batman and İskenderun. Economic reforms stabilized inflation, and Turkey became one of the fastest growing economies. However boycotts and strikes by university students in 1968 began political instability which especially concerned the Turkish military. Pressure was also mounting from the United States, as the Nixon Administration wished for Turkey to ban the cultivation of opium, which would have been politically costly for Demirel to implement. Demirel also had trouble brewing inside his own party, as he attempted to issue an amnesty to ex-Democrats, he was effectively vetoed by the armed forces. As a result, in 1970, several ex-DP deputies left the Justice Party to found the Democratic Party, while the Islamists also left to found the National Order Party under Necmettin Erbakan.

== The chaotic seventies ==
=== 1971 memorandum ===
A worsening economy, the 15–16 June events, one of the biggest workers' protests in the history of Turkey; disagreements between the government and military over the Cyprus dispute, escalations of tensions with Greece, and conflict between leftists and rightists served to define the last years of Demirel's first premiership as politically unstable. He blamed the liberal constitution for the crisis. He resigned as prime minister after his budget was blocked by parliament but formed his third government shortly after. A military coup attempt by National Democratic Revolutionaries on 9 March 1971 finally resulted in a direct military intervention on 12 March, and Demirel resigned for a military-supported government under Nihat Erim.

The constitutional amendments that Demirel wished for were implemented during technocratic military governance which relied on support from parliament. In the spring of 1973, with the presidential election on the agenda, to counter the army's influence over national politics, he reached an agreement with the new leader of the Republican People's Party (CHP), Bülent Ecevit, to support Fahri Korutürk as president instead of former chief of staff of Turkish Military Faruk Gürler. During the election process, tanks were positioned near Grand National Assembly of Turkey to indicate to MPs that the armed forces might intervene.

=== Nationalist Front governments ===
With the Justice Party emerging second in the general election in 1973, a grand CHP-AP coalition was expected. However, Demirel announced that "We can only come together in war." CHP instead formed a coalition with Erbakan's new Islamist party, the National Salvation Party (MSP). Ecevit's government carried out the Invasion of Cyprus, but ideological conflicts in the government prompted Ecevit to resign on 18 September 1974 and hold early elections. However early elections never happened, and instead Sadi Irmak had to head a caretaker government that lasted for 194 days from 18 September until 31 March, when, under the leadership of Demirel, a right-wing coalition government, the "First Nationalist Front", was established consisting of the Justice Party, MSP, the Nationalist Movement Party (MHP), and the Republican Reliance Party. In order for the coalition to survive, Islamist MSP supporters and ultranationalist MHP members were recruited within state institutions, intensifying the renewed political violence of the 1970s; 42 people were killed in a 1977 May Day rally at Taksim Square. The country entered an economic depression caused by a rise in global petrol prices, deficit in foreign payments and rapid inflation. Süleyman Demirel's nephew, Yahya Kemal Demirel, was arrested for corruption after an investigation by the journalist Uğur Mumcu during this period.

Despite gaining support in the 1977 elections the Justice Party again lost to CHP, which received 41.4 percent of the vote. However, Ecevit was not able to form a government, so Demirel became prime minister again, forming the Second Nationalist Front with only MSP and MHP. This government fell in a no-confidence vote on 31 December 1977, in what was known as the Güneş Motel Incident, where 13 Justice Party MPs defected from their party to support a CHP government where they received cabinet positions. Demirel refused to establish a dialogue with the CHP-dominated government and conducted a vicious opposition to Ecevit by referring to him as "head of government" instead of "prime minister". Referring to Ecevit's government, Demirel said "In no country in the world, could such a government [Ecevit's] with 1200 deaths, 70% inflation, disrepute, cruelty, torture, unjust and merciless partisanship stand for even one day. A cadre that has exceeded its ambition has usurped the administration." On 21 February 1979, he announced to President Korutürk that they were against the extension of martial law.

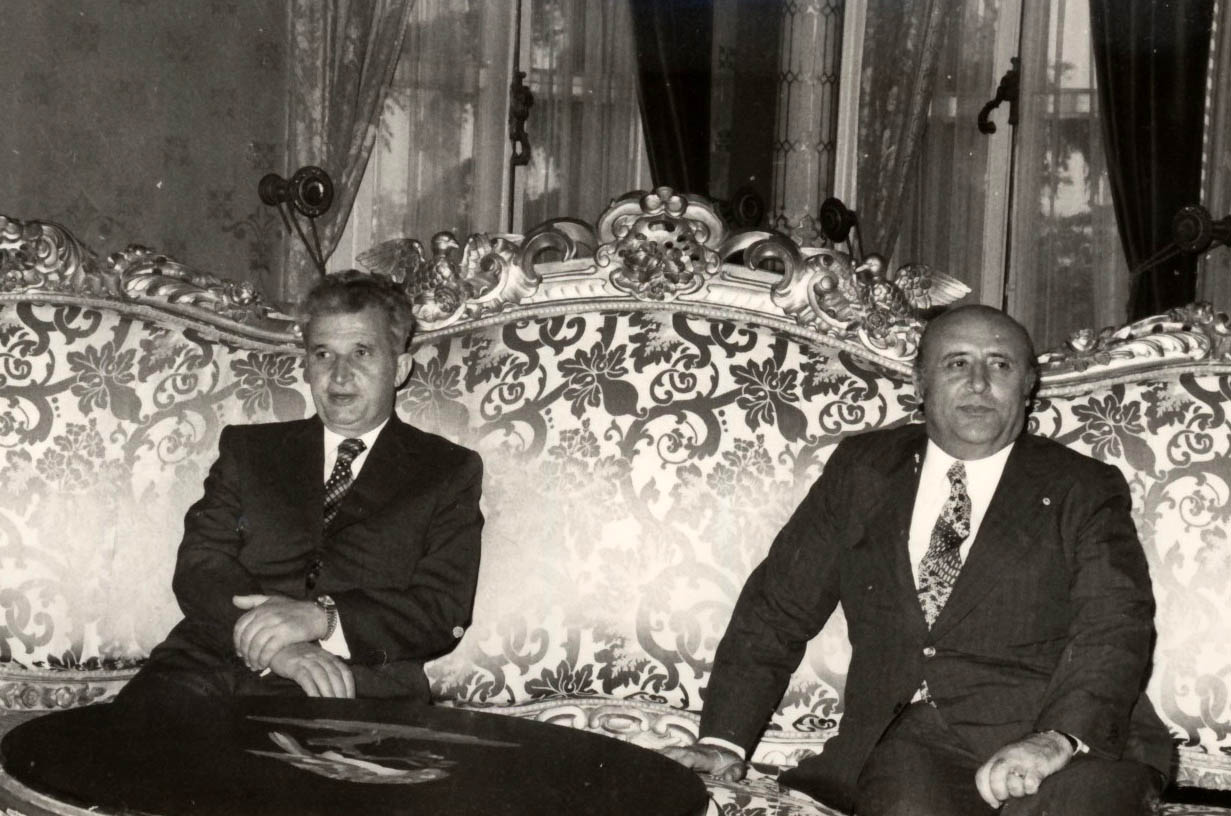
Nicolae Ceaușescu and Demirel, 1976

The troubles brought by American embargo, inflation, and escalating political violence meant Ecevit lost the 1979 by-elections, prompting his resignation. Demirel returned as prime minister, and established a minority government due to the negative atmosphere created by the Nationalist Front governments (MSP and MHP still provided confidence). His last premiership before the 1980 coup saw the implementation of the 24 January decisions which proved to be a turning point in Turkey's transition to a neoliberal economy. With political violence and assassinations at an all-time high, top military generals delivered a memorandum to President Korutürk, urging for politicians to put aside their differences to solve the country's problems, but this memorandum did nothing to get Demirel and Ecevit to cooperate. As Fahri Korutürk's presidential term was ending, a crisis brewed as to who would succeed him, with Demirel and Ecevit failing 115 times to elect a new president. Demirel's government lasted until the coup of 12 September 1980, which banned him from politics.

Demirel opened 268 İmam Hatip schools in his premierships between 1965 and 1980, becoming one of the politicians who opened the most İmam Hatip schools.

== Ban from politics ==
With the military coup on 12 September 1980, Demirel's prime ministership ended and he was kept under surveillance in Hamzaköy, Gelibolu (Gallipoli) for a month. He did not resign as chairman of the Justice Party until it was dissolved in 1981. With a provisional article in the new Constitution, he and most politicians were banned from politics for 10 years. However, he maintained ties with his party's former leaders. After political parties were allowed to be established in May 1983, Demirel declared, "I do not build shanty houses on my land with a title deed." He did not support the party that the military administration tried to have Bülend Ulusu founded, the Nationalist Democracy Party, nor the Motherland Party (ANAP) led by his protégé Turgut Özal. On 20 May 1983, the Great Turkey Party (BTP) was established by former Justice Party members, but it was swiftly banned by the National Security Council on the grounds that it was a continuation of the Justice Party. Demirel, along with former CHP and Justice Party members was forced to stay for four months in Zincirbozan, Çanakkale, on the grounds that he violated the political ban.

== Last premiership ==
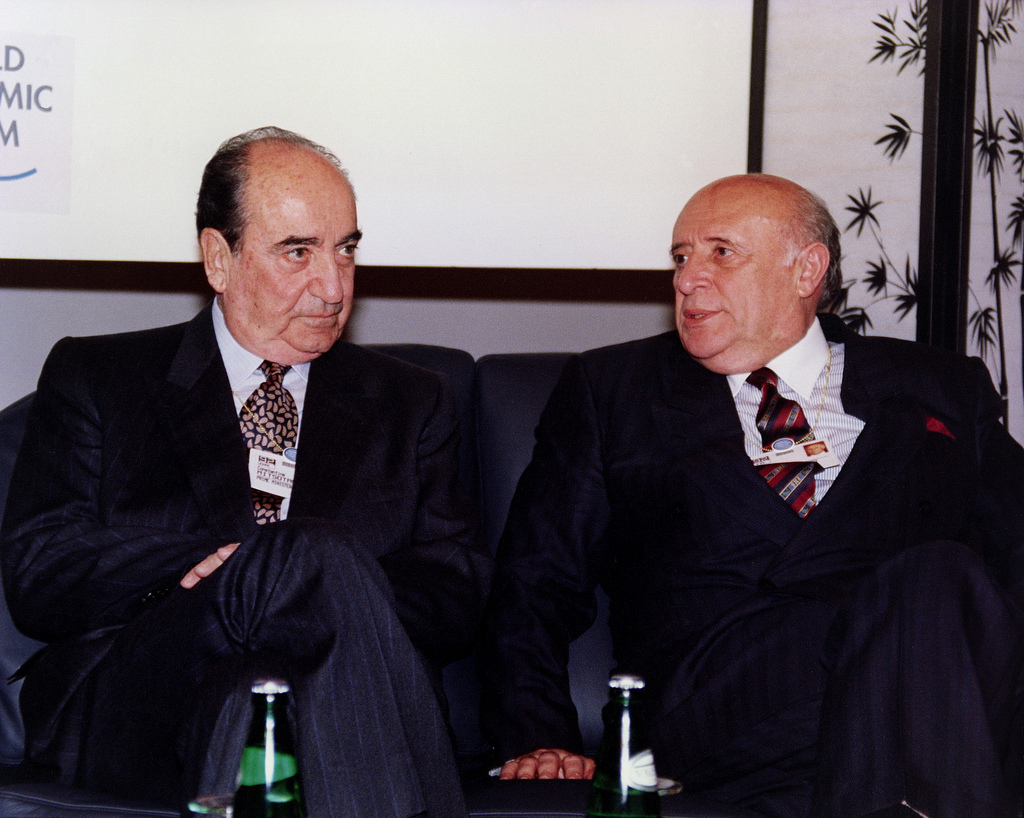
Greek Prime Minister Konstantinos Mitsotakis at the World Economic Forum, 1992

In 1986, Demirel launched a successful campaign for the lifting of pre-1980 politicians' political bans and initiated a referendum on the issue. Only 18 days after his political ban was rescinded, he was elected chairman at the extraordinary convention of the True Path Party (DYP), a new successor party to the Justice Party. He was re-elected Deputy of Isparta in the 1987 general election.

Following the 1991 election, Süleyman Demirel became prime minister once again in a coalition government with the Social Democratic Populist Party. Demirel acknowledged the distinction of Kurds being a different ethnicity from Turks, reformed criminal procedure law, removed the ban on all party names and abbreviations accumulated from military coups, and ratified international conventions on trade union freedoms. The "Green Card" social security program was also established and the age requirement for retirement was abolished. While the government had success combating far-left terrorist groups, the assassinations of journalist Uğur Mumcu and Gendarme commander Eşref Bitlis shocked the country. Though both coalition partners advocated for ending the OHAL zone and the village guard system in southeast Anatolia, Operation Provide Comfort meant the policies had to continue in the unstable region.

During this period, he carried out a strong opposition to his protégé and soon president, Turgut Özal, with whom he prepared the 24 January Decisions.

== Presidency ==
After the sudden death of Özal, Demirel was elected the ninth President of Turkey in 1993 by the Grand National Assembly. Resigning his party chairmanship, his successor for leadership of DYP became Turkey's first female prime minister, Tansu Çiller.

President Demirel drew backlash from statements he made in the aftermath of the Sivas Massacre in which 35 intellectuals –most of whom were Alevi– lost their lives when they were trapped in a burning hotel by a mob, which took place just one and a half months after he became president. He said, "The incident is an isolated incident. There was heavy provocation. As a result of this provocation, the people were agitated... The security forces did their best... There was no conflict between the groups. There was [only] loss of life due to the burning of the hotel."

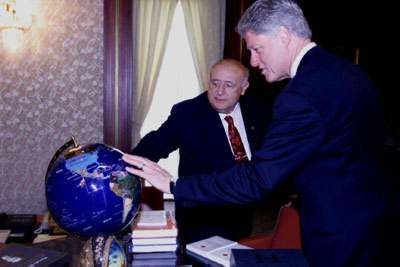
Bill Clinton and Demirel, 1999

Demirel gave Azerbaijani President Heydar Aliyev advanced notice of an upcoming coup attempt against his government backed by various factions of the Turkish army and intelligence services. President Demirel survived an assassination attempt in 1996 in a ribbon-cutting ceremony to open a shopping mall in İzmit. The would be assassin, İbrahim Gümrükçüoğlu said in his defence that he did not intend to kill the president, but that he intended to shoot into the air with his pistol to protest Turkey's military cooperation agreement with Israel. Doctors later diagnosed Gümrükçüoğlu with paranoia.

Demirel's role in the 1997 "Postmodern Coup" is controversial, with some accusing him of leading the effort to bring down Necmittin Erbakan's REFAHYOL government while others claimed that he prevented a complete military takeover by easing the tension. He did not appoint his once protegé Tansu Çiller prime minister after the ordeal, but instead ANAP chairman Mesut Yılmaz. Erbakan's Welfare Party, Ciller's DYP and the BBP opposed the move.

In 1997, Demirel participated in a conference organized by the Journalists and Writers Foundation, of which Fethullah Gülen was its honorary chairman, and received the "Statesman National Reconciliation Award" from him.

Though there was an attempt to extend his presidential term by another five years, Demirel stepped down from the presidency on 5 April. He handed over his duty to Ahmet Necdet Sezer on 16 May 2000. With his retirement from politics, his overall tenure as prime minister was shorter than only İsmet İnönü's and Recep Tayyip Erdogan's.

== Later life and death ==
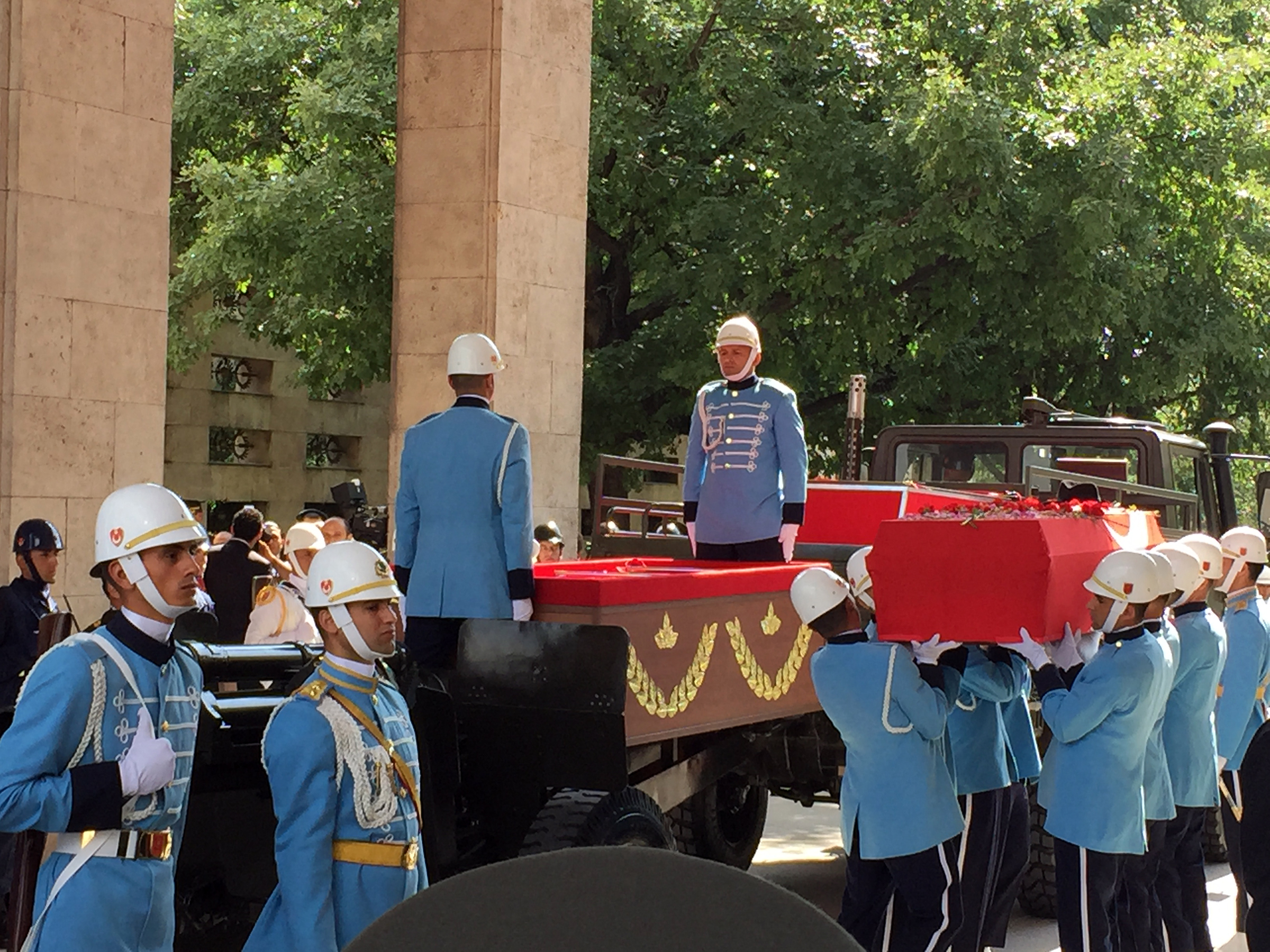
Demirel's funeral

Following his retirement from politics, Demirel was a frequent panelist and speaker at several events, mostly in universities, within Turkey.

Demirel was a member of the committee that drafted the Mitchell Report in 2001, which investigated the Israeli-Palestinian conflict in the midst of the Second Intifada and offered recommendations to reduce tensions.

His wife Nazmiye died on 27 May 2013, in the hospital where she was treated for Alzheimer's.

Süleyman Demirel died on 17 June 2015 at the Güven hospital in Ankara where he had been undergoing treatment for a respiratory tract infection. After the state ceremony in the Turkish Grand National Assembly and a religious ceremony at Kocatepe Mosque on 19 June 2015, Demirel's body was taken to a mausoleum in his hometown of Atabey, Isparta. In 2019, the Süleyman Demirel Mausoleum was completed and opened to visitors.

== Legacy ==
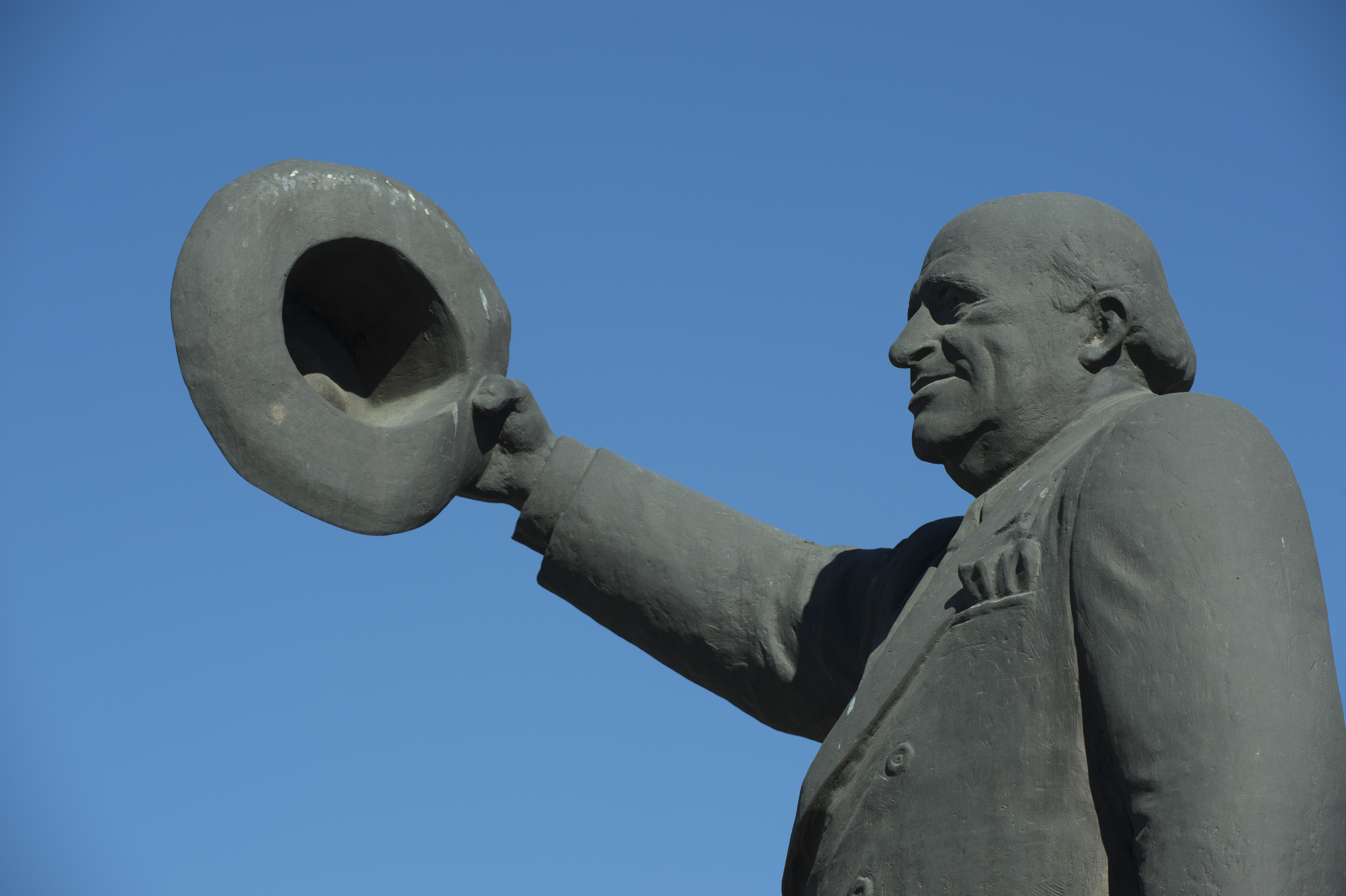
Statue of Süleyman Demirel

Demirel achieved many firsts throughout his political career. He formed the most governments, was longest serving prime minister in Turkish political history following İsmet İnönü and Recep Tayyip Erdoğan, and was the youngest prime minister at the age of 41. He also broke the records for the youngest politician to become a party leader at the age of 40, and the youngest general manager appointed to a public institution at the age of 30.

The Süleyman Demirel Airport and Süleyman Demirel University, both of which are in Isparta are named after him. So are the Süleyman Demirel Stadium in Antalya, the Süleyman Demirel Medical Centre of the Atatürk University in Erzurum and Suleyman Demirel University in Kazakhstan. There are also two important main streets named after him: one in Istanbul and the other in Muğla. In 2014 Süleyman Demirel Democracy and Development Museum was opened in Isparta.

== In popular culture ==
Süleyman Demirel was often nicknamed Baba (The Father) or Çoban Sülü (Sülü the Shepherd) and humorously Spartacus, after his native city of Isparta. His fedora hat was a famous part of his image.

With the song "Demirbaş" on the album Yadigâr (1995), Fikret Kızılok humorously described Demirel's inability to stay away from the political scene. "Süleyman", one of the hit songs of Barış Manço's 1992 album Mega Manço, was another satire of Demirel. He was portrayed by Haldun Boysan in the 2007 movie Zincirbozan. There are also references to Demirel in Cem Karaca's Raptiye. Demirel appeared as a guest actor in the film The President in the Other Turkey. Nejmi Aykar portrayed Demirel in the TV series Once Upon a Time in Cyprus, which was broadcast on TRT 1.

Although Demirel had retired, whenever there was political distress, Turkish media or his followers (humorously or otherwise) called on him with the words "Kurtar bizi baba" ("Father, save us").

=== Quotes ===
Demirel's most famous quote is "Dün dündür, bugün bugündür" ("Yesterday is yesterday, today is today"), which he said in response to those questioning his pragmatism. However he would also say: "Not everybody can wriggle out of the issue by saying 'Yesterday was yesterday, today is today', like I did."

When defending his actions during the 1970s energy crisis, he said "Benzin vardı da biz mi içtik?" ("Did we drink the gasoline, as if there were any?").

When speaking to a reporter when tensions were heightened with Greece due to the Aegean dispute he said: "Ege bir Yunan gölü değildir. Ege bir Türk gölü de değildir. Binaenaleyh Ege bir göl değildir." ("The Aegean is not a Greek lake. The Aegean is not a Turkish lake. Therefore, the Aegean is not even a lake.")

== Awards ==
- Poland : Order of the White Eagle, 28 October 1993
- Croatia : Grand Order of King Tomislav, 7 July 1994
- Kyrgyzstan : Order of Manas, 13 November 1998
- Azerbaijan : Istiglal Order, 12 June 1999
- Italy : Order of Merit of the Italian Republic, 7 October 1996
- Estonia : Order of the Cross of Terra Mariana, 1997
- Romania : Order of the Star of Romania, 1999
- Georgia : Order of the Golden Fleece, 1999
- Bulgaria : Order of Stara Planina, 16 March 1999
- Germany : Order of Merit of the Federal Republic of Germany, 6 April 2000
- Kazakhstan : Order of the Leopard, 27 August 2001
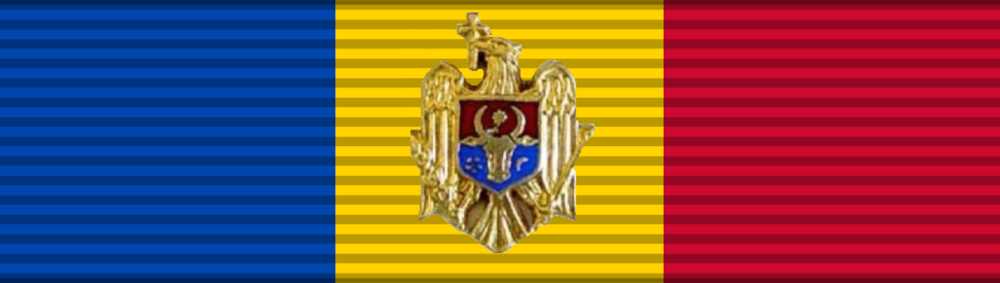
- Moldova : Order of the Republic, 1 November 2004
- Azerbaijan : Sharaf Order, 1 November 2013

== See also ==
- Conservatism in Turkey

== Notes ==
Party political offices
Preceded by Ragıp Gümüşpala	Leader of the Justice Party; 1964–1980	Position abolished
Preceded by Hüsamettin Cindoruk	Leader of the True Path Party; 1987–1993	Succeeded by Tansu Çiller
Political offices
Preceded by Kemal Satır	Deputy Prime Minister of Turkey; 1965	Succeeded by Sadi Koçaş
Preceded by Kemal Satır	Deputy Prime Minister of Turkey; 1965	Succeeded by Atilla Karaosmanoğlu
Preceded by Suad Hayri Ürgüplü	Prime Minister of Turkey; 1965–1971	Succeeded by Nihat Erim
Preceded by Sadi Irmak	Prime Minister of Turkey; 1975–1977	Succeeded by Bülent Ecevit
Preceded by Bülent Ecevit	Prime Minister of Turkey; 1977–1978	Succeeded by Bülent Ecevit
Preceded by Bülent Ecevit	Prime Minister of Turkey; 1979–1980	Succeeded by Bülend Ulusu
Preceded by Mesut Yılmaz	Prime Minister of Turkey; 1991–1993	Succeeded by Tansu Çiller
Preceded by Turgut Özal	President of Turkey; 1993–2000	Succeeded by Ahmet Necdet Sezer
