= Ministry of Treasury and Finance =

Government ministry of Turkey

Ministry of Treasury and Finance of the Republic of Turkey
- Türkiye Cumhuriyeti Hazine ve Maliye Bakanlığı

Agency overview
- Formed: 1923; 103 years ago
- Preceding agencies: Ministry of Finance; Undersecretariat of Treasury
- Jurisdiction: Republic of Turkey
- Headquarters: Ankara
- Minister responsible: Mehmet Şimşek
- Deputy Ministers responsible: Abdullah Erdem Cantimur; İsmail İlhan Hatipoğlu; Osman Çelik; Zekeriya Kaya
- Parent agency: Cabinet of Turkey
- Website: en.hmb.gov.tr

The Ministry of Treasury and Finance (Turkish: T.C. Hazine ve Maliye Bakanlığı) is a government ministry office of the Republic of Turkey, responsible for finance and tax affairs in Turkey. The current minister is Mehmet Şimşek, serving since 3 June 2023.

== Departments ==
The following departments are subordinate to the Ministry of Finance:

- Debt Office
- Tax Inspection Board
- Strategy Development Unit
- Directorate General of Budget and Fiscal Control
- Directorate General of Revenue Policies
- Department of the European Union and Foreign Affairs
- Ministry of Finance Centre for Higher Training
- Financial Crimes Investigation Board
- Chief Legal Advisory and Directorate General of Proceedings
- Directorate General of Public Accounts
- Directorate General of National Property
- Directorate General of Personnel
- Department of Administrative and Financial Affairs

== See also ==
- List of finance ministers of Turkey
- Ministry of Finance (Ottoman Empire)
