= Justice Party (Turkey) =

Former political party in Turkey

Justice Party Adalet Partisi
- Chairman: Ragıp Gümüşpala (1961-1964); Süleyman Demirel (1964-1981)
- General Secretary: Nuri Kemal Bayar
- Founder: Ragıp Gümüşpala
- Founded: 11 February 1961
- Dissolved: 18 August 1981
- Preceded by: Democrat Party
- Succeeded by: True Path Party; Motherland Party; Great Turkey Party
- Headquarters: Ankara, Turkey
- Ideology: Turkish nationalism Liberal conservatism Right-wing populism Atlanticism; Demirel faction (1960s–1970s): Keynesianism; Other factions: Social liberalism
- Political position: Centre-right
- Colours: Red (official); Purple (customary)

The Justice Party (Turkish: Adalet Partisi, AP) was a Turkish political party prominent in the 1960s and 1970s. A descendant of the Democrat Party, the AP was dominated by Süleyman Demirel, who served six times as prime minister and later as president, and was in office at the time of the military coup on 12 September 1980. Along with all other political parties in Turkey, the Justice Party was suppressed in the immediate aftermath of the coup. It was subsequently re-established as the True Path Party in 1983.

The Justice Party was a Turkish nationalist and liberal conservative party. It advocated Kemalist principles, parliamentary democracy and a market economy. It strongly supported membership in NATO and close relations with the United States.

== History ==
=== Establishment ===
With the 1960 coup d'état, Turkey's generals disbanded the formerly dominant Democrat Party. They could not, however, entirely dismantle the vast grassroots organization that this party had left behind. Democrat Party officials were based in many of the squatter neighborhoods in Turkey's larger cities, and would quickly incorporate newly arrived Anatolian migrants into the party's fold. A number of parties soon emerged to reclaim this newly partyless Democrat voting bloc. The Justice Party was one of these neo-Democratic parties, first established by retired general Ragıp Gümüşpala in 1961. It immediately adopted the galloping horse logo of the Democrat Party.

The Justice Party quickly proved the most successful in consolidating the existing Democrat Party provincial organizations, particularly in the western regions of the country. The New Turkey Party, however, was initially more successful in eastern Turkey. In the 1961 elections, the two post-Democrat parties combined to win a very impressive 48.5% of the vote, 34.8% of which went to the Justice Party alone. The ruling generals, however, would not allow for a neo-Democrat government to replace the old order they had brought down. Instead they asked İsmet İnönü, whose Republican People's Party was the largest party with 36.7% of the vote, to form a coalition government.

=== Rise ===
İnönü's various coalitions would form the government until 1964, but in the meantime the Justice Party continued to grow, steadily gaining votes at the expense of the smaller post-Democrat parties. The Republican People's Party eventual turn towards left of centre would also help to give the military a somewhat more favorable view of the Justice Party. In this political climate, the 1963 nationwide local elections gained increased importance, and eventually came to be seen as a political referendum on the newly established parties. The Justice Party ultimately emerged as a triumphant winner, winning around 46% of the vote and establishing itself as the most popular party in the country.

With its popular appeal well established, the Justice Party turned to issues of leadership. Gümüşpala died in 1964, and questions soon emerged over who would succeed him as the party's leader. Sadettin Bilgiç, a doctor by training, had become acting party president following Gümüşpala's death, and initially emerged as the favorite for the position. But the Turkish press tarnished Bilgiç's reputation, accusing him of political and religious conservatism. Party leaders soon started to worry that he would ruin the party's image with the Turkish intelligentsia and, more importantly, the army. Indeed, the military head of state, Cemal Gürsel, began pushing for a more progressive candidate to take charge - Süleyman Demirel.

Demirel came from a modest village background, and climbed up the social latter by the way of his education. He had studied in the United States as an Eisenhower fellow and then worked in a US multinational construction company. He appealed to the party's base of newly urbanized rural migrants, who could identify with his modest beginnings and status as a self-made man. At the Justice Party's national convention in December 1964, Demirel ultimately defeated Bilgiç for the party's general-president post.

Once firmly in charge, Demirel began his assault on İnönü's fragile coalition, making sure it failed to win a vote of confidence in early 1965. Parliamentary bickering finally led to the triumphant 1965 elections, in which the Justice Party received nearly 53% of the vote and promptly formed a majority government with 240 seats. The party had achieved this result by appealing to small-holder peasants emerging from poverty, small commercial and industrial groups as well as the newly rich farmers; it performed most strongly in the relatively rich western provinces of Turkey, along the Aegean coast and in Thrace. This Justice Party victory was simultaneously a historical loss for the Republican People's Party, which suffered the worst defeat in its political history so far by winning only 134 seats and 29% of the vote.

=== Decline ===
The Justice Party's good fortune, however, did not last for long. The small Anatolian enterprises that had formed a key part of the party's constituency couldn't compete with the Istanbul area's large, modern corporations. These entrepreneurs felt betrayed, and defected from the Justice Party to smaller rightist alternatives. Meanwhile, the country suffered through increasing socio-political strife, as conflicts between leftist and rightist groups turned increasingly violent. Since Demirel symbolized a pro-Western capitalist current in the Turkish establishment, he became an easy target for both the far left and the religious right. The party was still able to win the 1969 elections, carrying 256 seats with around 46.5% of the vote, but the overall situation grew increasingly chaotic. The near-constant street violence escalated, threatening the Turkish economy and ultimately provoking the military to intervene once again in 1971. With the power once again firmly in its hands, the military forced Demirel to resign.

The Justice Party was not able to win the elections held in 1973 and 1977, but Demirel was able to serve as prime minister three more times between 1975 and 1980, albeit with coalition partners. On 12 September 1980, the military once again staged a coup d'état, and this time banned Demirel and the Justice Party from the country's politics. After an extended pause, the party eventually reemerged as the True Path Party, complete with the galloping horse logo, in 1983.

Grand National Assembly of Turkey
Election	Votes			Seats		Status
Election	#	%	Rank	#	±	Status
1961	3,527,435	34.8	2nd	158 / 450	new	AP-CHP Coalition (1961-1962)
1961	3,527,435	34.8	2nd	158 / 450	new	Opposition (1962-1965)
1965	4,921,235	52.9	1st	240 / 450	▲82	Government
1969	4,229,712	46.5	1st	256 / 450	▲16	Government
1973	3,197,897	29.8	2nd	149 / 450	▼107	Opposition (1973-1975)
1973	3,197,897	29.8	2nd	149 / 450	▼107	AP-MSP-MHP-CGP Coalition (1975-1977)
1977	5,468,202	36.9	2nd	189 / 450	▲40	AP-MSP-MHP Coalition (1977-1978)
1977	5,468,202	36.9	2nd	189 / 450	▲40	Opposition (1978-1979)
1977	5,468,202	36.9	2nd	189 / 450	▲40	Minority Government (1979-1980)

== See also ==
- Süleyman Demirel
- Nationalist Front
- Turkish nationalism
- Liberalism in Turkey
- Conservatism in Turkey

== Sources ==
- Ahmad, Feroz. "Turkey: The Quest for Identity". Oxford: Oneworld, 2003.
- Dodd, C.H. (1992). "The Development of Turkish Democracy". British Journal of Middle Eastern Studies, Vol. 19, No. 1 (1992), pp 16–30
- Sherwood, W.B. (1967). "The Rise of the Justice Party in Turkey". World Politics, Vol. 20, No. 1, pp 54–65
