= Surname Law =

1934 Turkish law regulating surname adoption

The Surname Law (Turkish: Soyadı Kanunu) of the Republic of Turkey is a law adopted on 21 June 1934, requiring all citizens to adopt the use of fixed, hereditary surnames. The concept of surnames originated in the Ottoman Empire as families began to adopt surnames after improvements were made to population registries and censuses, a practice that accelerated as growing secularization and modernization efforts required their allocation in state-sponsored programs. The enactment of the Surname Law enforced the use of official surnames but also stipulated that citizens choose Turkish names.

The Surname Law is considered one of the last measures of secularization that took place in the early years of the Republic of Turkey. Academic reflections of the Law often highlight that its distribution was uneven, and that the choice of surname, as well as its use across the Republic, differed among families depending on factors such as profession and competition. Additionally, the Surname Law has been criticized for its role in advancing policies of Turkification against minorities and indigenous peoples in the Republic, which took place alongside place name changes.

Although applications for legal surname changes have since taken place, namely among descendants of forcibly Islamized Armenians, Turkish law maintains a strict policy on them.

== Origin ==
In the Ottoman Empire, surnames were not used in name-giving practices, which resulted in confusion for birth records and difficulties in economic relations and conscription efforts. More families in the Ottoman Empire began to adopt surnames after developments in population registries and censuses in the 19th century. The adoption of Turkish surnames and names can be traced back to the educated class of the Ottoman Empire as a result of growing dissemination of Turkology, as well as the time of the Second Constitutional Era and growing Kemalist discourse. (Note: Initial discussions of the Surname Law centered around whether Turks had previously had surnaming practices to begin with.) One of the first Ottoman intellectuals to Turkify his names was Ziya Gökalp, who outlined how the enforcement of Turkish surnames should be carried out. Through the 1926 Turkish civil code, surnames were introduced as clauses protecting names from exploitation, as well as familial systems regarding the use of surnames and applications to change names.

Although Turkification of names was planned as early as 1923, momentum for the law intensified as part of Atatürk's reforms in the 1930s. The reforms sought to create a homogenous nation that shared a common religion, language, and ethnicity, sometimes aimed at the general population but in others directed at ethnic/religious minorities. Such reforms were often most pronounced in Turkey's cities, where they were documented and disseminated. Representatives in the Republic's new parliament suggested that place names and regular names be changed to fit with the Republic's national ideals, and proposed the law as a "law of modernization" and standardization.

By March 1929, a ministerial commission was established to write a first draft bill for the law. The draft law was submitted on 11 March 1933, arguing that up to then Turkish surnames had been optional, creating disorder. During discussions of the draft law, Nuri Bey, deputy of Muğla, introduced a bill consistent with the draft law that contained 17 articles, emphasizing that getting a surname was an expression of national identity for individuals. Turkish MP Refik Şevket İnce suggested that, instead of using the term Soyadı (ancestry name), the term Sanadı (reputation name) should have been used for the Surname Law, referring to the method that was used for naming Muslim families in the Ottoman period, based on their reputation or fame in society. However, the Grand National Assembly of Turkey decided to use the term Soyadı because it denoted the meaning of ancestry, family, or relative.

The law was debated on 16 June 1934 in the Grand National Assembly. While the first two articles were passed without opposition, the third article caused controversy and requests for clarification, afterwards being passed without any changes. Other negotiations for articles of the law also took place. The law was officially passed with 15 articles on 21 June 1934.

== Rules and contents ==
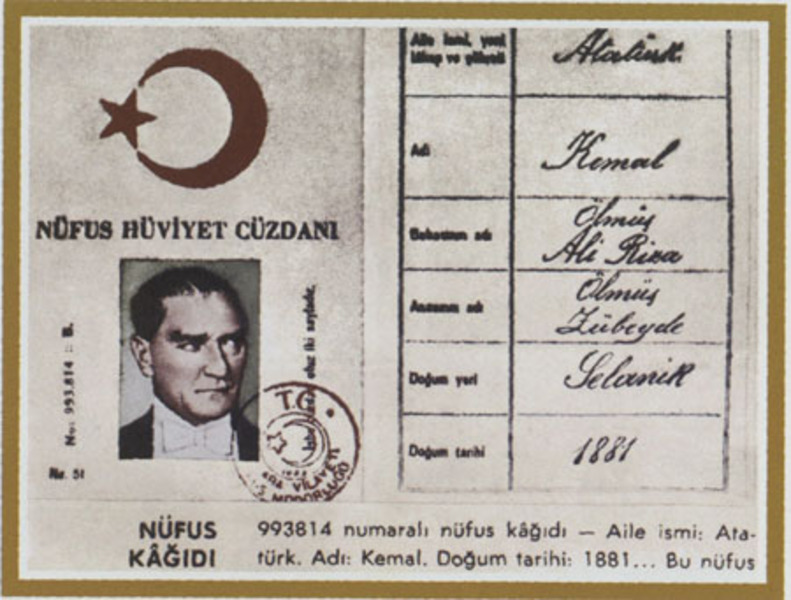
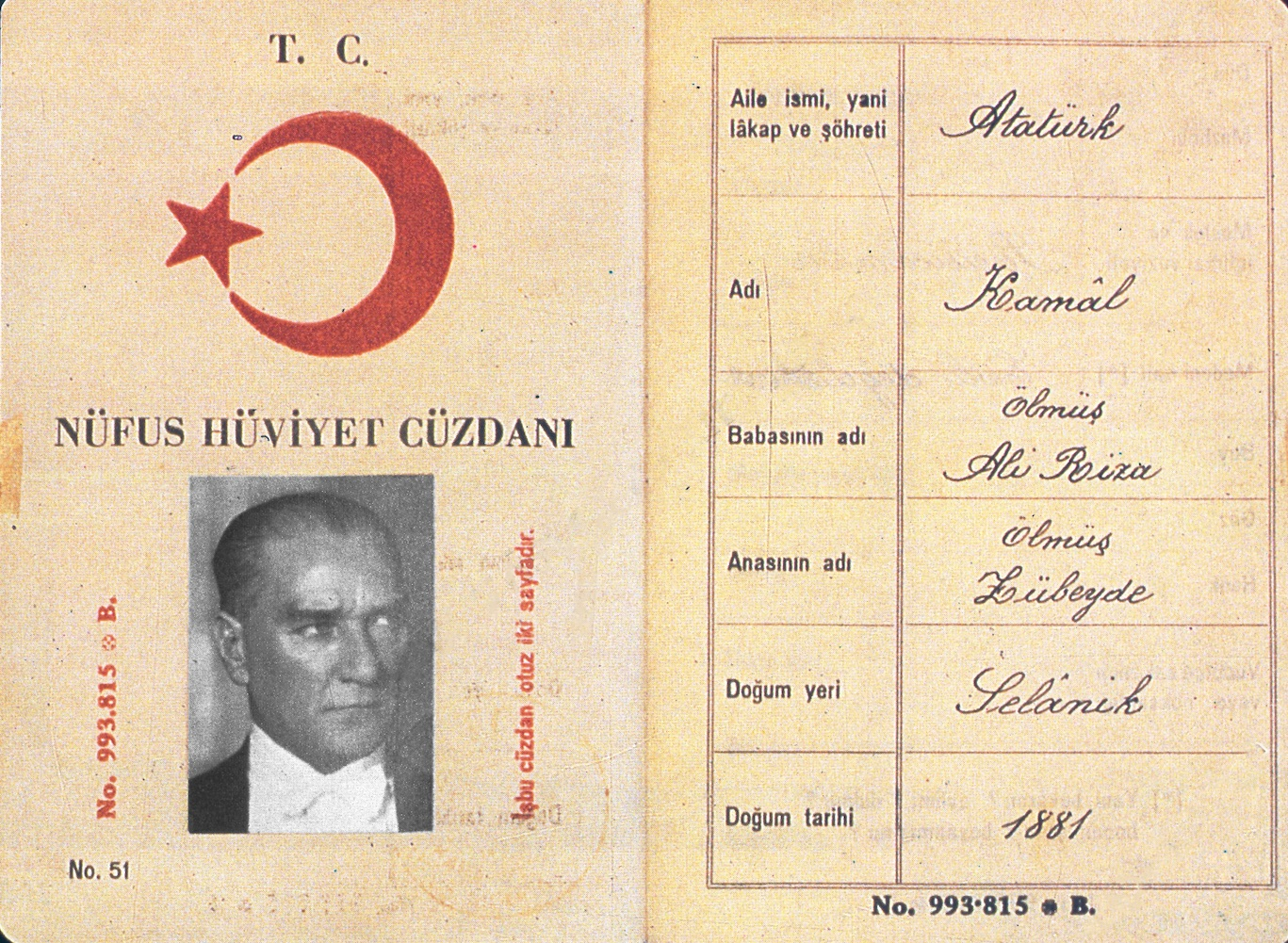
Atatürk's identity documents after the Surname Law

The articles of the Soyadı Kanunu stipulated that:

1. All Turks must bear their surnames in addition to their proper names;
2. The surname must follow the proper name in signing, speaking and writing;
3. Names may not relate to military rank and civil officialdom; to tribes, foreign races or ethnicities; nor may they be offensive or ridiculous. The use of "historical names" without the proper genealogical evidence is also forbidden.

The law gave the right to men to choose surnames as the "head of the household"; however, in his absence, death, or mental incapacitation, women were given this right. Additionally, names could not be duplicated in the same district; in case of disputes, the right to a surname was awarded to the family that first claimed it. Other articles, such as Articles 6 and 12, provided power to civic registries and prosecutors to challenge or deny surnames that were not in accordance with the Surname Law.

The surname law specifically forbade certain surnames that contained connotations of non-Turkish cultures, nations, tribes and religions. The surname could be suffixed with ‑oğlu, but it was forbidden to use "non-Turkish" affixes, such as: ‑ian or ‑yan (Armenian), ‑of(f), ‑ov or ‑(v)iç (Slavic), ‑is, ‑dis, ‑pulos, ‑aki (Greek); ‑zade (Persian); and ‑mahdumu, ‑veled, Bin‑, Ben‑ or İbn‑ (Semitic). Names of clans or tribes could not be used or re-used, nor could names "referring to other ethnicities" (ex. Turkish: Arnavutoğlu, lit. 'the Albanian's son'; Turkish: Kürdoğlu, lit. 'the Kurd's son') or "taken from another language". The stated aim of this clause aimed to "erase difference, which does not exist in reality.", whereas in reality, the aim was to assimilate various ethnic groups into Turkish identity and erase the plurality of Turkish society. In this sense, the Surname Law imposed linguistic uniformity and homogeneity.

On 15 December 1934, decree 2/1720 was passed approving the enforcement of the Surname Law. On the adoption of the law, the requirement for surnames was to become effective on New Year's Day of 1935, and citizens of the Republic of Turkey were given two years to comply. Many of the regulations of the Surname Law were also mentioned in the Regulation on Family Names (Turkish: Soyadı Nizamnamesi), which provided detailed guidelines for state registrars and local officials to enforce the law. Two follow-up laws related to the Surname Law were passed in November 1934; one of them, the Law on the abolition of such appellations and titles as efendi, bey, and pasha (Turkish: Efendi, bey, pașa, gibilakab ve ünvanların kaldırıldığına dair kanun) banned honorific titles that were used in the Ottoman Empire, while the other bestowed the name Atatürk on Mustafa Kemal. This latter law simultaneously prevented anyone else in the Republic from adopting the same surname.

== Implementation ==
Government officials, including figures such as Celâl Bayar and Adnan Menderes, were quick to scramble for appropriate surnames in competition with other officials. Press publications in the country afforded significant coverage to the Surname law and offered support to people wishing to adopt surnames. Even as the January 1935 deadline came, hundreds of petitions had not yet been processed, and those who hurried in choosing a surname announced their choices in newspapers to prevent others from picking the same surname. Suspect criminals of the Armenian genocide had sought changes to their surnames to hide their identity and attempt evasion of crimes related to the genocide.

The adoption of surnames differed from rural to urban areas and by level of education; in some stories of families in Turkey, those in rural areas less connected to the cities would have an official surname and a local surname, with the latter being tied to the intimate community they were surrounded by. In other stories, the choice of surname could also be tied to publications, familial authority structure, rejection of certain names at population registries, profession, place names, heroic and tribal eponyms, and objects, among others. Generally, the rural population was much less open to the idea of taking a surname, with misunderstanding and resistance present, resulting in an extension to the law. Men in the family were given privilege to choose a surname, something which was done very carefully as they could be scarce or even coveted. In records of population registries, lists of potential names were included as families had brought different ideas, indicating a process of negotiation. In general, the procedure for applying the law was not standardized, including those for minorities.

Many surnames adopted in the 1930s often depicted nationalistic and shamanistic imagery, the latter composed from elements originally from animals, minerals, and celestial aspects. A depository of Turkish surnames created by Şükrü Kaya was certified by authorities in 1934, containing 5,500 potential patronyms based on Turkish figures. During the years of 1934 and 1935, many guidebooks on Turkish names were published, which included reprints of the Surname Law and suggestions on how to create new names. Mehmet Ölmez states that names in these booklets asserted to be Turkish were later found to be Mongolian or Chinese in actuality. Besim Atalay, an MP for Aksaray, wrote a book that was published by the Turkish Linguistic Society and composed of pure Turkish names and surnames, which were not popular among the public.

As a result of the Surname Law, many non-Turkic minorities in the space of the Republic of Turkey, including Greeks, Armenians, Jews, Assyrians, and Kurds were forced to adopt last names of a more Turkish rendition. The recognized minorities of the Republic under the Treaty of Lausanne (Jews, Armenians, and Greeks) were not legally bound to name changes, as long as they were spelt in the Turkish alphabet, and measures used for name changes were similarly seen by the majority Muslim population. At least for Armenians and Orthodox Rum, this meant that they were allowed to conserve their patronyms; however, many ended up changing their surnames due to concerns of the stigma of belonging to a non-Muslim minority group. Changes in minority names were often done in various means, including:

- Cutting off the ethnic-marking ending
- Maintaining one syllable of an old surname and adapting it to Turkish
- Adopting an innocuous name
- Translating the old name to Turkish

Translation was a common method of renaming but had differing effects. (Note: A clause for translation was planned but never made it into the final draft of the Surname Law.) For Assyrians, personal and geographical names with no meaning in Turkish were put in place of their original names, described as an erasure of both Assyrian heritage and identity. Armenian name changes often reflected stories of minority survival (as well as larger patterns of Armenian erasure from Anatolia), though responses among the remaining Armenian community typically varied with some choosing to change their name whilst others declined. Some would use different names in different settings in order to avoid potentially violent situations. Greek families often negotiated and resisted imposition of name changes by officials, while Jews had some of the highest rates of name and surname changes.

== Criticisms ==
The Surname Law was eventually criticized due to errors in its implementation among other issues. Writers such as Rıza Nur highlighted problems with the law such as the choice of the word "surname", the placement of the surname after the first name, and the similarity of some names to German names. In criticisms against the law that were made in the 1940s, it was stated that the law went beyond its original objectives due to defaults in its implementation and individual preferences.

Ziyaeddin Fahri Fındıkoğlu was dismayed that the law created an onomastic stock of surnames that were unrelated to popular usage, and wrote an article in honor of Ziya Gökalp to suggest four changes to the law that would fix these issues. New surnames were also criticized for being alafranga (a term designating French/European background), and Nihad Sami Banarli felt dismayed over what he perceived as imitated surnames. An article concerning name changes in Kocaeli Province expressed dissatisfaction with surnames as lacking broader historical depth.

== Legacy ==
In the years since the Surname Law, scholars have noted that the process of ensuring Turkish surnames was uneven, and that it ultimately became a reflection of hierarchical boundaries within families and communities. Popular reception to the Surname Law was multi-faceted, and stories involving the adoption of surnames are shaped by individual representations of Turkish history. In discussions of the history of modern Turkey, the Surname Law receives less attention than other Kemalist reforms, and is often only given passing mention; the law began to face more scrutiny around the 1990s. Scholarly interest in the Surname Law was parallel to that of Atatürk's reforms and has been the subject of studies across fields like anthropology and folklore; though as of 2021, there was not an in-depth study about the implementation of the Surname Law.

The Surname Law is often regarded as a process of Turkification from the early years of the Republic, when state elite saw differences as a threat to national ideals and sought homogenization. The regulation of the Surname Law had aligned people of different ethnic and religious backgrounds along the same national ideals, creating a rupture from the diversity of the Ottoman past. While some were able to maintain their original family names, and attempts were made by some to keep ethnic markings in them, other cases were given to replace names with new Turkish ones. Emmanuel Szurek, an associate professor at the School for Advanced Studies in the Social Sciences in Paris, writes that through language planning, the surname reform favored the Turkish naming system to the detriment of others, and that surname reform was an exercise in constructing a metahistorical reputation, supporting notions of patronymic nationalism. For Kurds, the Surname Law was the most efficient policy of Turkification against them as tribal linkages were cut off.

=== Applications for reversal ===
Since the law was enacted in the 1930s, many families have petitioned to courts to reclaim old surnames or to change their surnames to one more flattering. Applications continued into the 1970s and 80s, and into the 21st century. In 2014, the ruling Justice and Development Party introduced a bill allowing citizens to directly petition population registries for surname changes instead of filing lawsuits directly to court.

Applications for name changes from Turkified surnames have taken place since the enactment of the Surname Law, including by citizens who have moved outside of Turkey and Crypto-Armenians. Such applications have not usually been successful in Turkey (though in European countries such as Belgium, successful name changes have occurred). The Court of Cassation has often maintained a strict and conservative policy regarding name changes, especially for minorities, stipulating that they must be of Turkish origin and that they be written according to Turkish grammar rules.

In 2011, an Assyrian citizen named Favlus Ay appealed to a court to change their last name to "Bartuma"; however, the Constitutional Court of Turkey (AYM) rejected this on the basis of disrupting national unity. Similar requests made by the community have been rejected as well. In the context of Ay's case, some judges have criticized the law for contradicting the equality principle of article 10 of the Turkish constitution, as well as its references to the concept of race (this was similarly used in Ay's argument). Felix Petersen, a doctor of philosophy at the Hebrew University of Jerusalem, writes that decisions by the AYM reinforces problematic social constructions where differences are ignored, though emphasizes the dissenting opinions of some of the judges in the court.

== See also ==
- List of Ottoman titles and appellations
- Thai name § Surnames, similar law in Thailand passed in 1913

== Sources ==
- Akdemir, Mary (31 January 2023). "Big Secrets, Small Villages: The Collective Memory of the Assyrian Genocide". In Akçam, Taner; Kyriakidis, Theodosios; Chatzikyriakidis, Kyriakos (eds.). The Genocide of the Christian Populations in the Ottoman Empire and its Aftermath (1908-1923) (1st ed.). London: Routledge. doi:10.4324/9781003207221. ISBN 9781003207221.
- Aslan, Senem (2009). "Incoherent State: The Controversy over Kurdish Naming in Turkey". European Journal of Turkish Studies. 10: 1–42. doi:10.4000/ejts.4142. ISSN 1773-0546.
- Avedian, Vahagn (11 October 2012) [August 2012]. "State Identity, Continuity, and Responsibility: The Ottoman Empire, the Republic of Turkey and the Armenian Genocide". European Journal of International Law. 23 (3): 814. doi:10.1093/ejil/chs056 – via Oxford University Press.
- Bayar, Yesim (29 March 2021). "Navigating the nationalist landscape of exclusion: Armenian citizens of Turkey and the politics ofnaming". The British Journal of Sociology. 72 (4): 1127–1140. doi:10.1111/1468-4446.12846. PMID 33825182 – via Wiley Online Library.
- Bayir, Derya (21 April 2016). Minorities and Nationalism in Turkish Law (1st ed.). London: Taylor & Francis. doi:10.4324/9781315595511. ISBN 9781315595511.
- Doǧaner, Yasemi̇n (2009). "An Identity Construction in the Turkish Republic: The Law on Family Names". Wiener Zeitschrift für die Kunde des Morgenlandes. 99. Ankara: 113–125. JSTOR 23861984.
- Kaya, Ayhan (8 April 2013). Europeanization and Tolerance in Turkey: The Myth of Toleration. Istanbul Bilgi University: Palgrave Macmillan. doi:10.1057/9781137318190. ISBN 978-1-349-33616-6.
- Omtzigt, Pieter, ed. (2012). The Slow Disappearance of the Syriacs from Turkey: And of the Grounds of the Mor Gabriel Monastery (PDF). LIT Verlag. ISBN 9783643902689. OCLC 830904751.
- Ölmez, Mehmet (2000). "Dil Devrimi Sonrası Ad Ve Soyadlarımız" [Our Names and Surnames After the Language Revolution] (PDF). Journal of Turkish Studies (in Turkish). 24 (2). Harvard University: 107–117.
- Özgül, Ceren (16 July 2014). "Legally Armenian: Tolerance, Conversion, and Name Change in Turkish Courts". Comparative Studies in Society and History. 56 (3). University of Michigan: 622–649. doi:10.1017/S0010417514000279.
- Özgür, Ergün (2022). "Challenges of Participation in Belgium, Germany and the Netherlands: Christian-Assyrian and Muslim-Turk Immigrants". Revista Internacional de Estudios Migratorios. 12 (1): 28–54. doi:10.25115/riem.v12i1.5320. ISSN 2173-1950.
- Petersen, Felix (18 April 2018). "Judicial review and social construction: the case of the Turkish Constitutional Court". Research and Policy on Turkey. 3 (1). Hebrew University of Jerusalem: 18–39. doi:10.1080/23760818.2018.1445232. ISSN 2376-0818.
- Sayoglu, Melike (31 January 2018). "Diversity and Inclusion in Turkey: Citizenship and Belonging". In Gertz, SunHee Kim; Huang, Betsy; Cyr, Lauren (eds.). Diversity and Inclusion in Higher Education and Societal Contexts: International and Interdisciplinary Approaches. Palgrave Macmillan. pp. 75–95. doi:10.1007/978-3-319-70175-2. ISBN 978-3-319-70174-5.
- Spencer, Robert F. (1961). "The Social Context of Modern Turkish Names". Southwestern Journal of Anthropology. 17 (3). University of Minnesota: 205–218. doi:10.1086/soutjanth.17.3.3629041.
- Szurek, Emmanuel (April 2013). "To Call a Turk a Turk: Patronymic Nationalism in Turkey in the 1930s". Revue d'histoire moderne et contemporaine. 2013 (60–2): 18–37. doi:10.3917/rhmc.602.0018. ISSN 0048-8003 – via Cairn.info.
- Toktaş, Şule (4 December 2005). "Citizenship and Minorities: A Historical Overview of Turkey's Jewish Minority". Sociology Lens. 18 (4): 394–429. doi:10.1111/j.1467-6443.2005.00262.x. hdl:11729/2016.
- Türköz, Meltem (5 June 2008) [31 October 2007]. "Surname narratives and the state–society boundary: Memories of Turkey's family name law of 1934". Middle Eastern Studies. 43 (6). Taylor & Francis: 893–908. doi:10.1080/00263200701568253.
- Türköz, Meltem (9 November 2017). Naming and Nation-building in Turkey: The 1934 Surname Law. Işık University: Palgrave Macmillan. doi:10.1057/978-1-137-56656-0. ISBN 9781137566560. LCCN 2017951395.
