= Paul Gootenberg =

American historian

Paul Eliot Gootenberg is a historian of Latin America who specializes in the history of the Andean drug trade, the fields of Peruvian and Mexican history, as well as historical sociology. He earned an M.Phil. from the University of Oxford (1981) and a Ph.D. from the University of Chicago (1985), and is currently a professor of history and co-director of Latin American Studies at the State University of New York at Stony Brook. He has been both a Rhodes Scholar and a Guggenheim Fellow. Along with the historian Herman Lebovics and the sociologist Daniel Levy, he is a coordinator of the Stony Brook Initiative for Historical Social Sciences.

Gootenberg is the author of Imagining Development: Economic Ideas in Peru's "Fictitious Prosperity" of Guano, 1840-1880, which has been described as having "had a profound impact on Peruvian historiography". Referring to himself as a "recovering economic historian", Gootenberg has centered his scholastic energies on contributing to the crafting of a "new history of drugs" and has published several works in the field. He has also written Andean Cocaine: The Making of a Global Drug, which Gootenberg describes as "cocaine's first full-length biography". It has received mostly positive reviews, with the historian Arnold Bauer calling it Gootenberg's "most accomplished book to date" and the St. John's University scholar Elaine Carey stating that the book should be considered "an essential work for any scholar or student of the histories of narcotics, Latin America, and economics."

== Works ==
=== Books ===
- 'The Origins of Cocaine: Colonization and Failed Development in the Amazon Andes' Edited with Liliana Dávalos (Routledge, 2018)
- Between Silver and Guano: Commercial Policy and the State in Postindependence Peru (Princeton University Press, 1989)
- Imagining Development: Economic Ideas in Peru's "Fictitious Prosperity" of Guano, 1840-1880 (University of California Press, 1993)
- Cocaine: Global Histories (ed.) (New York: Routledge, 1999)
- Andean Cocaine: The Making of a Global Drug (University of North Carolina Press, 2009)
- Indelible Inequalities in Latin America: Insights from History, Politics, and Culture (ed.) (Duke University Press, 2010) with Luis Reygadas

=== Book chapters ===
- "Beleaguered Liberals: The Failed First Generation of Free Traders in Peru" in Love, Joseph L. and Nils Jacobsen (eds.). Guiding the Invisible Hand: Economic Liberalism and the State in Latin American History. (Praeger, 1988)
- "Paying for Caudillos: The Politics of Emergency Finance in Peru, 1820–1845" in Peloso, Vincent C. and Barbara Tenenbaum (eds.). Liberals, Politics, and Power: State Formation in Nineteenth-Century Latin America. (London: University of Georgia Press, 1996)
- "Cocaine in Mexico: A Prelude to 'Los Narcos'" with L. Astorga in Gootenberg, Paul. Cocaine: Global Histories. (New York: Routledge, 1999)
- "Doctors, Diplomats, and Businessmen: Conflicting Interests in the Netherlands and Dutch East Indies, 1860–1950" with M. de Kort in Gootenberg, Paul. Cocaine: Global Histories. (New York: Routledge, 1999).
- "Reluctance or Resistance?: Constructing Cocaine (Prohibitions) in Peru, 1910–1950" in Gootenberg, Paul. Cocaine: Global Histories. (New York: Routledge, 1999)
- "Hijos of Dr. Gerschenkron: "Latecomer" Conceptions in Latin American Economic History" in Centeno, Miguel Angel and Fernando López-Alves. The Other Mirror: Grand Theory Through the Lens of Latin America. (Princeton University Press, 2001)
- "Talking Like a State: Drugs, Borders, and the Language of Control" in van Schendel, Willem and Itty Abraham. Illicit Flows and Criminal Things: States, Borders, and the Other Side of Globalization. (Indiana University Press, 2005)
- "Cocaine in Chains: The Rise and Demise of a Global Commodity, 1860–1950" in Topik, Stephen, Carlos Marichal, and Zephyr L. Frank (eds.). From Silver to Cocaine: Latin American Commodity Chains and the Building of the World Economy, 1500–2000. (Duke University Press, 2006)

=== Articles ===
- "The Social Origins of Protectionism and Free Trade in Nineteenth-Century Lima". (1982). Journal of Latin American Studies. 14 (2): 329–358.
- "Carneros y Chuño: Price Levels in Nineteenth-Century Peru". (Feb. 1990). The Hispanic American Historical Review. 70 (1): 1–56.
- "North—South: Trade Policy, Regionalism, and Caudillismo in Post–Independence Peru". Journal of Latin American Studies. 23 (2): 273–308.
- "Population and Ethnicity in Early Republican Peru: Some Revisions". (1991). Latin American Research Review. 26 (3): 109–157.
- "Paying the Price of Freedom: Family and Labor Among Lima's Slaves, 1800–1854". (1995). Journal of Latin American Studies. 27 (3): 712–713.
- "On Salamanders, Pyramids, and Mexico's 'Growth Without Change': Anachronistic Reflections on a Case of Bourbon New Spain". (1996). Colonial Latin American Review. 5 (1): 117–127.
- "The Coca Boom and Rural Social Change in Bolivia". (1998). The Hispanic American Historical Review. 78 (1): 149–150.
- "Daniel Nugent (1954–1997)". (1998). The Hispanic American Historical Review. 78 (1): 117–119.
- "Close Encounters of Empire: Writing the Cultural History of US–Latin American Relations". (1999). Social History. 24 (3):
- "Between Coca and Cocaine: A Century or More of US–Peruvian Drug Paradoxes, 1860–1980". (2003). The Hispanic American Historical Review. 83 (1): 119–150.
- "Between a Rock and a Softer Place: Reflections on Some Recent Economic History of Latin America". Latin American Research Review. 39(2): 239–257.
- "Secret Ingredients: The Politics of Coca in US–Peruvian Relations, 1915–65". (2004). Journal of Latin American Studies. 36 (2): 233–265.
- "Desigualdades Persistentes en América Latina: Historia y Cultura". (2004). Alteridades. 14 (28): 9–19.
- "Scholars on Drugs: Some Qualitative Trends". (2005). Qualitative Sociology. 28 (4): 479–491.
- "Order[s] and Progress in Developmental Discourse: A Case of Nineteenth Century Peru". (2006). Journal of Historical Sociology. 8 (2):111–135.
- "A Forgotten Case of "Scientific Excellence on the Periphery": The Nationalist Cocaine Science of Alfredo Bignon, 1884–1887". (2007). Comparative Studies in Society and History. 49 (1): 202–232.
- "The 'Pre–Columbian' Era of Drug Trafficking in the Americas: Cocaine, 1945–1965". (2007). The Americas. 64 (2): 133–176.
- "Los Liberales Asediados: La Fracasada Primera Generación de Librecambistas en el Perú, 1820–1850". Revista Andina. 6 : 403–450.
- "Talking About the Flow: Drugs, Borders, and the Discourse of Drug Control". (2009). Cultural Critique. 71: 13–46.

=== Book reviews ===
- The Origins of the Peruvian Labor Movement, 1883–1919 by Peter Blanchard. (1984). Journal of Latin American Studies. 16 (1): 205–208.
- A Century of Debt Crises in Latin America: From Independence to the Great Depression, 1820 1930 by Carlos Marichal. (1990). The Hispanic American Historical Review. 70 (1): 196–197.
- Real hacienda y economía en Hispanoamérica, 1541–1820 by Bernard Slicher van Bath. (1990). The Journal of Economic History. 50 (4):971–972.
- The Foreign Policy of Peru by Ronald Bruce St. John. (1993). The American Historical Review. 98 (3): 984–985.
- Slavery and Abolition in Early Republican Peru by Peter Blanchard. (1994). The Americas. 50 (4): 568–569.
- Bolivia and Coca: A Study in Dependency by James Painter. (1995). The Journal of Developing Areas. 29 (4): 564–566.
- Paying the Price of Freedom: Family and Labor Among Lima's Slave, 1800 1854 by Christine Hünefeldt. (1995). Journal of Latin American Studies. 27 (3): 712–713.
- Crafting the Third World: Theorizing Underdevelopment in Rumania and Brazil by Joseph Love. (1997). The Americas. 53 (4): 614–616.
- Neoliberalism, Transnationalization, and Rural Poverty: A Case Study of Michoacan, Mexico by John Gledhill. (1997), The Hispanic American Historical Review. 77 (4): 733–734.
- Latin America: Economy and Society Since 1930 edited by Leslie Bethell. (1999). The Hispanic American Historical Review. 79 (3):551–553.
- Modernity at the Edge of Empire: State, Individual, and Nation in the Northern Peruvian Andes, 1885–1935 by David Nugent. (1999). Journal of Interdisciplinary History. 30 (1): 163–164.
- Selva Central: History, Economy, Land Use in Peruvian Amazonia by Fernando Santos-Granero and Frederica Barclay (trans. Elisabeth King). (1999). The Journal of Economic History. 59 (4): 1109–1110.
- The Idea of the Middle Class: White Collar Workers and Peruvian Society, 1900 1950 by D. S. Parker. (1999). Journal of Social History. 33 (3): 702–703.
- Peasants on Plantations: Subaltern Strategies of Labor and Resistance in the Pisco Valley, Peru by Vincent Peloso. (2000). The Journal of Economic History. 60 (3): 885–886.
- The Bewitchment of Silver: The Social Economy of Mining in Nineteenth-Century Peru by José R. Deustua. (2002). The Americas. 58 (3): 497–498.
- Goods, Power, History: Latin America's Material Culture by Arnold Bauer. (2003). Journal of World History. 14 (4): 561–563.
- Bourbon Peru: 1750–1824 by John Fisher. (2004). The American Historical Review. 109 (3): 952–953.
- The Political Economy of the Drug Industry: Latin America and the International System by Menno Vellinga. (2004). The Americas. 61 (2): 260–261.
- Drugs, Labor, and Colonial Expansion edited by William Jankowiak and Daniel Bradburd. (2005). American Anthropologist. 107 (1): 152–153.
- "More and More Scholars on Drugs". (2008). Qualitative Sociology. 31 (4): 425–436.
- More Than Gold: The Story of the Peruvian Guano Trade by David Hollett (2009). The Americas. 66 (2): 257.
