= Daniel Nugent =

American anthropologist (1954–1997)

- Born: 1954
- Died: October 15, 1997 (aged 43); Tucson, Arizona
- Education: University of Chicago (Ph.D.)
- Known for: Historical anthropology State formation
- Scientific career
- Fields: Anthropology
- Workplaces: University of Texas at Austin, University of Arizona

Daniel Nugent (1954-1997) was an American anthropologist and professor at the University of Arizona. His most notable works include Everyday Forms of State Formation, a co-edited collection of essays about state formation in modern Mexico and Rural Revolt in Mexico: U.S. Intervention and the Domain of Subaltern Politics, an edited collection of essays about subaltern politics in Mexico. Nugent was also a playwright, and he co-wrote the play 13 Days/Los Trece Dias: The Zapista Uprising in Chiapas which toured nationally from 1996 to 1997. He died in Tucson at the age of 43.

== Education ==
Nugent attended the University of Chicago for undergrad, where he befriended future historians such as Paul Gootenberg. After a brief period where he studied at Oxford University, he returned to the University of Chicago to obtain his Ph.D under the guidance of radical anthropologists Terry Turner and John Comaroff. His work was heavily influenced by Friedrich Katz.

== Career ==
Nugent began his academic career at the University of Texas at Austin, where he directed the Mexican Center at the Institute of Latin American Studies for two years. In 1990, he moved to the University of Arizona as an assistant professor of anthropology. By 1991, he was elected as a fellow of the American Anthropological Association. While at the University of Arizona, he wrote Spent Cartridges of Revolution, edited Rural Revolt in Mexico and U.S. Intervention, and served as an editor of the Journal of Historical Sociology. He was also involved with the Political theatre movement, including with the San Francisco Mime Troupe and the Borderlands Theater. He co-wrote the play 13 Days/Los Trece Dias: The Zapista Uprising in Chiapas with his wife Eva Tessler.
