= Plan Rubber =

WW II plan for a U.S. invasion of Brazil

Joint Basic Plan for the Occupation of Northeast Brazil
- Part of Second World War
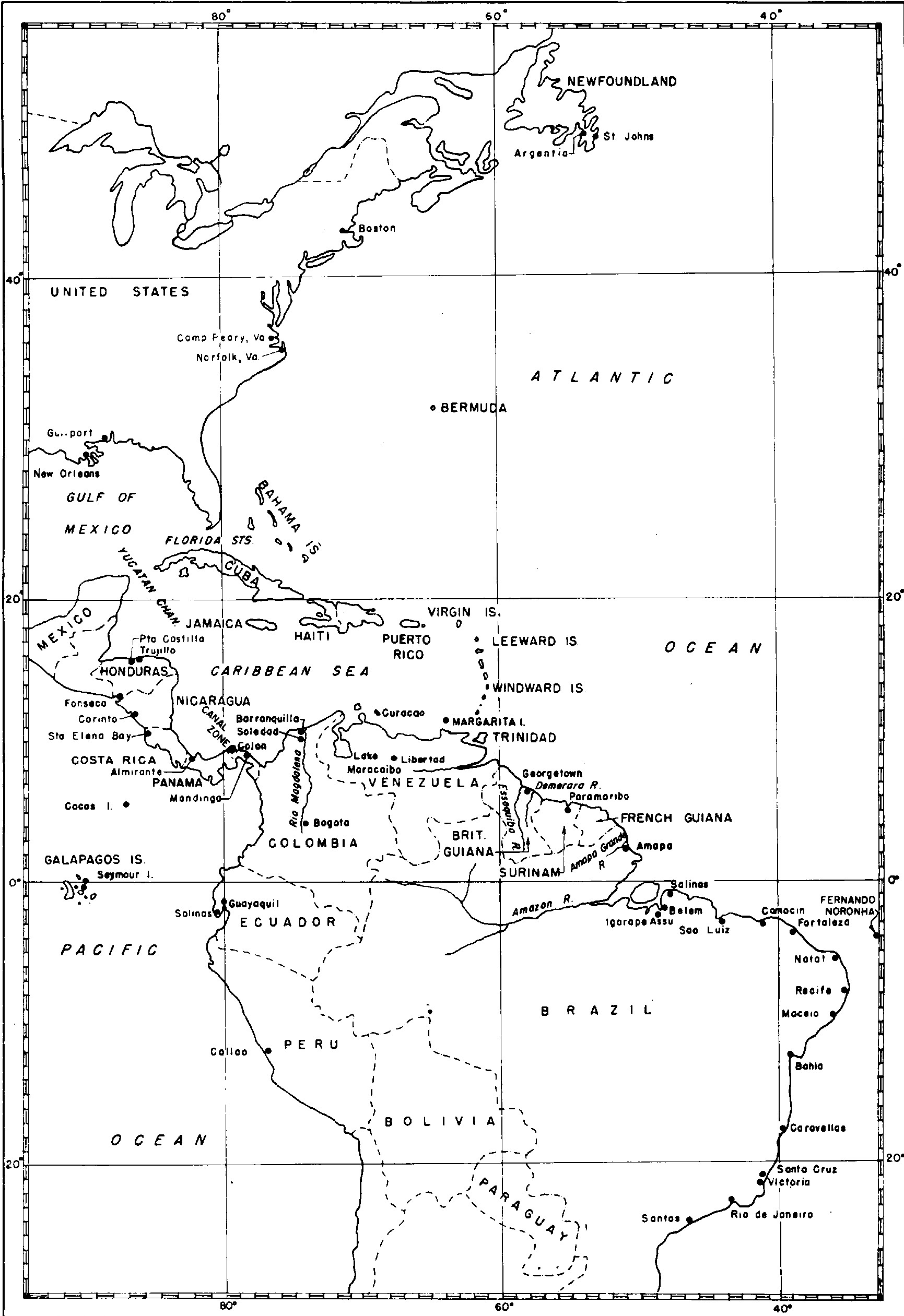
- Map of the Western Atlantic Defensive Zone
- Planned: December 1941 – February 1942
- Planned by: United States Armed Forces
- Commanded by: Royal E. Ingersoll
- Objective: Bases in Northeastern Brazil and Pará
- Executed by: United States Atlantic Fleet; 1st Marine Division; 9th Infantry Division
- Outcome: Never attempted
- Casualties: 2,902 expected in the American side

An operation with the codename Plan Rubber was the amphibious component of the Joint Basic Plan for the Occupation of Northeast Brazil, J. B., Serial 737, dated 21 December 1941. This would have been a United States military invasion of the northeastern coast of Brazil, through the beaches of Natal, during World War II. The plan was never carried out due to successful diplomatic initiatives with Brazilian President Getúlio Vargas.

Brazil's northeastern salient or bulge is where South America is at its closest to Africa, and thus offered American strategists an air route through the Atlantic Ocean and a platform for maritime patrol in the Battle of the Atlantic. Since the late 1930s, the region was part of the US's defensive perimeter as defined by its military planners. Since 1941 the Brazilian Armed Forces were reinforcing their hitherto almost undefended coastline north of Rio de Janeiro, but officials in the American Franklin D. Roosevelt administration deemed these defenses insufficient and feared the Brazilian Estado Novo dictatorship would align itself with the Axis powers or be overthrown by a pro-Axis coup.

A land intervention in Brazil was studied by previous plans such as May 1940's "Pot of Gold" and November 1941's "Lilac". Plan Rubber had its main goal in the city of Natal, which would be occupied by the US Marine Corps. US Army reinforcements would proceed by land to Fortaleza and Recife. Further landings would occupy Belém, Salvador and Fernando de Noronha. Brazil's Army, Navy and Air Force were deemed unprepared for an effective defense, and Brazilian reinforcements would have to come from the south in an eight to twelve-day movement by sea. Nevertheless, difficult geography on the beaches (except in Salvador) and unprepared landing craft crews could cause high casualties.

Military planning offered alternatives in case diplomatic negotiation failed. The latter was already producing results months before Brazil's entry into the Second World War on the American side in August 1942. The US Armed Forces were allowed to operate in air and naval bases in the Brazilian bulge, rendering invasion plans unnecessary. Parnamirim airfield, on Natal's outskirts, became one of the busiest American air bases in the war.

== American concerns over Brazil ==
=== Geographic relevance ===
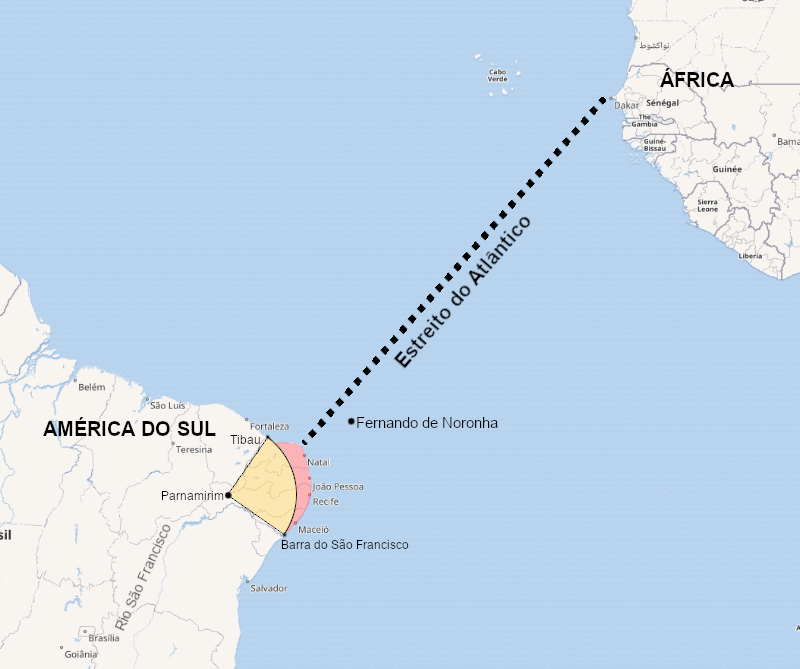
The Atlantic Narrows and the Brazilian Army's definition of the northeastern salient, in yellow and red

Already in 1938, prior to the outbreak of war, American military planners studied a conflict with Germany, Italy and Japan, which would later comprise the Axis powers. Some placed the defensive perimeter of the United States as far as the 10th parallel south in South America, which would include the Brazilian bulge but neglect the Southern Cone. This corresponds to the concept of a "Quarter Sphere" with corners in Newfoundland, Alaska, the Galapagos Islands and northeastern Brazil. The Quarter Sphere is distinct from the traditional "American lake" (an exclusive defense of the continental United States and Caribbean) and "hemispheric defense", which would cover the entire American continent.

An enemy-controlled Galápagos or Brazilian bulge would threaten the Panama Canal. Far eastern Brazil is South America's closest point to Africa, down to a minimum of 2900 kilometers between Natal and Dakar. The imaginary line between both cities is known as the "Atlantic Narrows" and is one of the definitions of the border between the North and South Atlantic. The Narrows are a convenient position to split the two halves of the Atlantic or cross from one continent to another. Aircraft of this period could cover the gap in eight hours. The development of air power and the Africa-Natal air route changed calculations in the defense of the Western hemisphere. American strategists saw Natal as the likely bridgehead in a German invasion of Brazil.

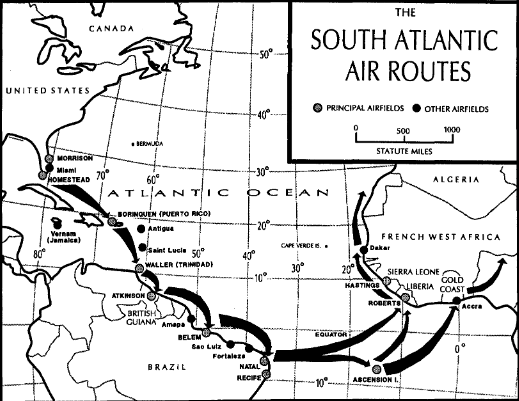
Main bases in the air route over the Atlantic Narrows

In January 1939, Under Secretary of State Sumner Welles brought up the possibility of a pro-German coup in Brazil, followed by a German invasion through the Atlantic Narrows. This scenario was used in the Navy's Fleet Problem Exercise in the fall. German pressure over Vichy France after 1940 created concern over a potential Wehrmacht presence in French West Africa, including Dakar. This city's distance from Natal was less than half of the distance between Natal and Norfolk, Virginia. It is controversial if German intentions of an attack on the US through Africa existed in the first place. A 1960 publication by the US Army's Center of Military History observed there were German plans for Spain, Gibraltar (Operation Felix) and Morocco, but no evidence they extended to a transcontinental invasion of Brazil. And yet American planners saw such an invasion as the logical next step after Africa. Historian Frank McCann states German limitations made this invasion a fantasy, but American planners had to work with imperfect information and worst-case scenarios.

The South Atlantic became the only viable air route towards North Africa and Europe in December 1941. The Japanese attack on Pearl Harbor moved the United States directly into the global conflict, which had involved essentially European powers and their colonies, and interrupted the air route towards general Douglas MacArthur's besieged troops in the Philippines. Winter interrupted traffic over the North Atlantic. Airports in Natal and Recife were less than 1750 nautical miles from Freetown, Sierra Leone, through which transport aircraft of the United States Army Air Corps could deliver priority cargo, personnel and the planes themselves to North Africa, the Middle East, India, Burma, China and the Philippines. Furthermore, naval and air bases in the region could be used in the Battle of the Atlantic for patrols against the German U-boat threat to navigation.

=== Vulnerable defenses ===
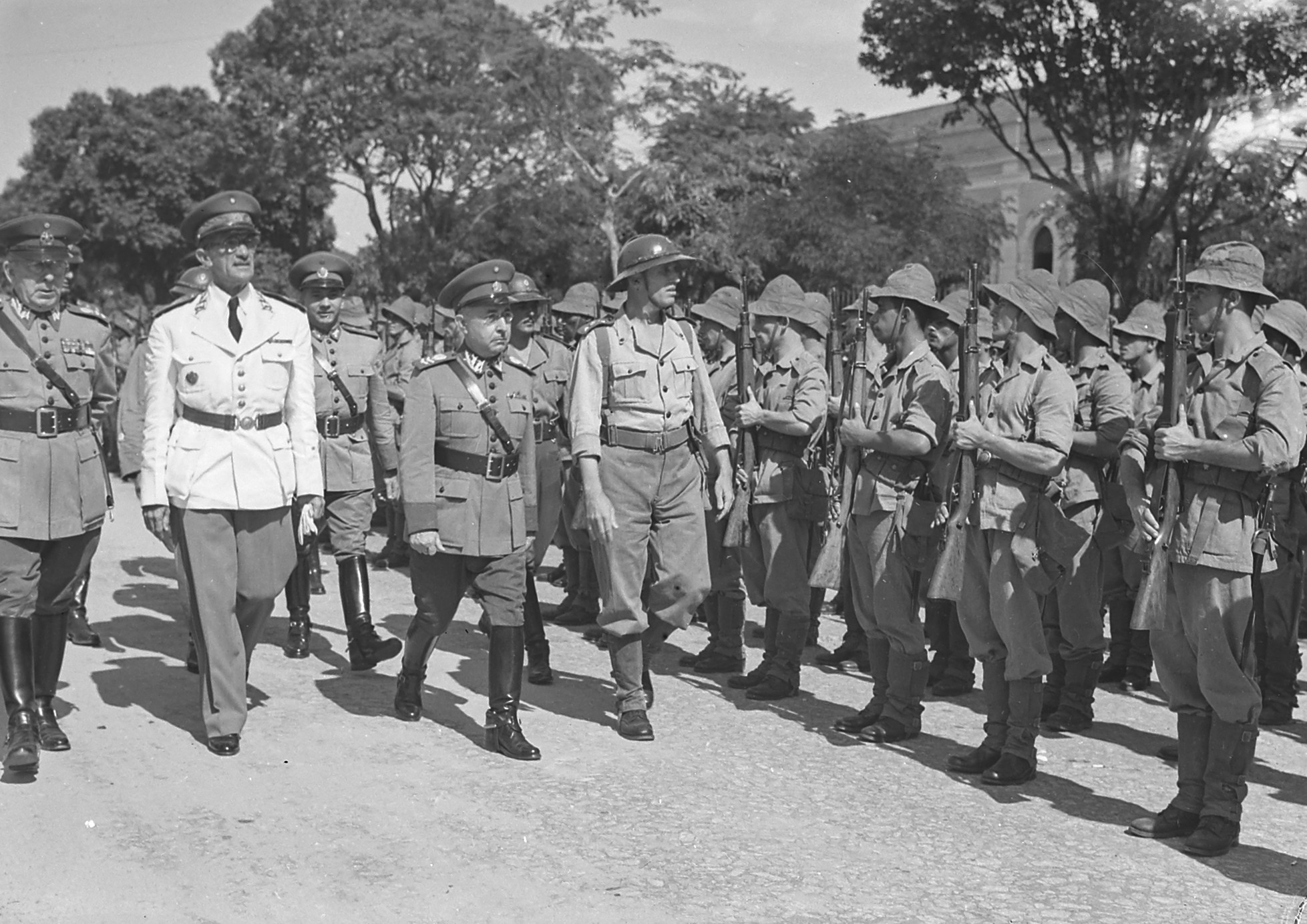
General Mascarenhas de Morais, commander of the 7th Military Region between 1940 and 1943

American planners feared the vulnerability of Brazilian defenses in the northeast and the country as a whole. A Department of War analysis in January 1939 found the coastal cities to be "almost completely defenseless", and air defense did not exist, not even in Rio de Janeiro and São Paulo. This comment might have been exaggerated, but Brazil's military weakness was real. The Brazilian Army's 60 thousand men in 1939 lacked modern armament and were concentrated south of the capital, neglecting 2500 miles of coastline to the north. The US Army believed only an American ground presence would be enough to defend the region. Brazilian land and air defenses couldn't resist a modern combat force.

Prior to April 1941, the Brazilian Army's presence in the 7th Military Region, comprising the northeastern states of Alagoas, Pernambuco, Paraíba, Rio Grande do Norte, Ceará, Piauí and Maranhão, was mostly limited to a battalion of caçadores (light infantry) in each state capital. From 1940 to 1943, this regional command was under general Mascarenhas de Morais, who would later command the Brazilian Expeditionary Force. General Estevão Leitão de Carvalho assumed command of the East and Northeast Theater of Operations (Portuguese: Teatro de Operações de Este e Nordeste, TO - E/NE), which oversaw the 7th and 6th (Bahia and Sergipe) Military Regions, in February 1942.

In a February 1941 correspondence to the US, military attaché Lehman W. Miller argued American servicemen should not be sent to Brazil until the country felt itself threatened, as Brazilian public opinion was hostile to the Axis, but sensitive to a violation of their national sovereignty. And yet the US Army's fear was precisely that Brazil wouldn't react in time. Brazil's Minister of War, Eurico Gaspar Dutra, and Army Chief of Staff, Góis Monteiro, recognized the northeast was vulnerable; their fellow officers desired to strengthen their institution and defend their territory without relying on American assistance on land. But the country's low level of industrialization meant any rearmament relied on foreign suppliers, be they German or American.

In the course of several years, the Brazilian Ministry of War concentrated an unprecedented troop strength in the northeast. Reservists began to be called up in the region on the 24th of July, 1941. Far-away units were moved to the northeast and transformed or absorbed by others. The transport of personnel and equipment took place by sea, a route which would prove itself vulnerable when German U-Boats torpedoed Brazilian ships in 1942. There were no railways or highways connecting the north and south of the country, and this was the major weakness of the northeastern theater of operations. The safer alternative, transport over the São Francisco river, would have to rely on neglected infrastructure.

In December 1941, the Natal garrison comprised the 16th Infantry Regiment, 1st Company of the 1st Engineering Battalion and 4th Pack Artillery Group, equipped with two batteries of Schneider 75 millimeter guns. The 1st Group of the 3rd Antiaircraft Artillery Regiment, with two batteries of Krupp 88 mm, arrived on the 15th of January, 1942. The João Pessoa garrison comprised the 15th Infantry Regiment and the 3rd Battery of the 4th Pack Artillery Group. (Note: Mentioned in Duarte 1971, p. 193 without specifying its location, which is explained in AHEx 2020, p. 72.) Inland Paraíba had the 22nd Caçadores Battalion in Campina Grande, where the 1st Howitzer Group arrived on January 6, 1942. Fortaleza was defended by the prewar 23rd Battalion of Caçadores and a reformed 29th Battalion of Caçadores. (Note: "In fact, the old 29th battalion, in Natal, was disbanded and replaced by the 2nd Battalion of the 16th Infantry Regiment, which remained with the remainder of the regiment in that city's garrison; but Notice N. 2859 of September 26, 1941, reorganized the 29th and gave it Ceará's capital as its garrison" (Duarte 1971, p. 191).) The Maceió, São Luís, and Teresina garrisons each consisted of the 20th, 24th and 25th Caçadores battalions, all of them prewar formations.

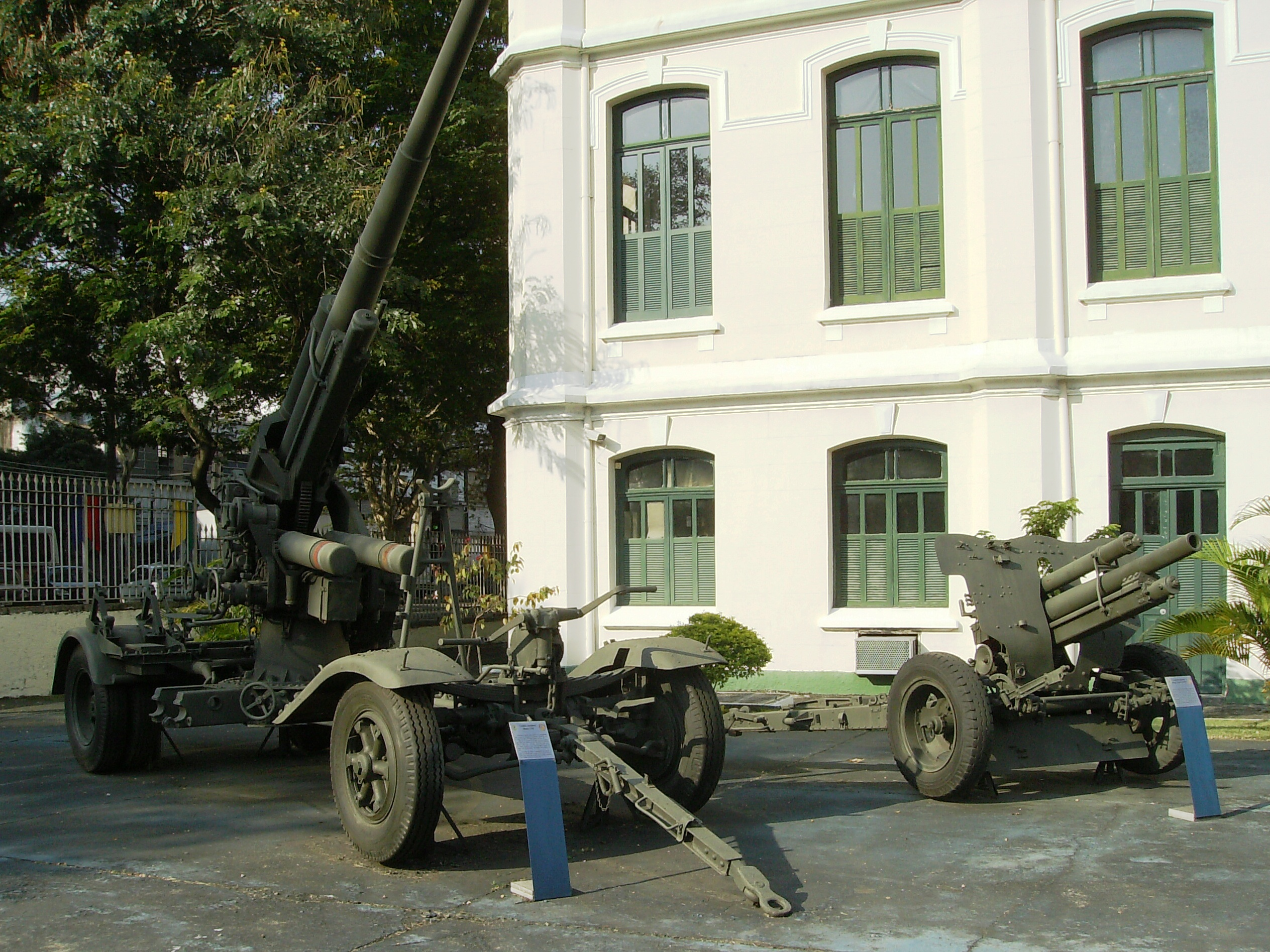
Brazilian Army Krupp 88 mm and 75 mm guns

Recife and nearby Olinda were garrisoned by the 14th Infantry Regiment, the 2nd Independent Guard Company, the Antiaircraft Machine Gun Battery, the 2nd Independent Motorized Artillery Battery, and the 4th Independent Transport Company. The two batteries and the 3rd Battery of the 4th Pack Artillery Group were unified in the Independent Mixed Artillery Group, based in Olinda, on January 2. The machine gun battery, the only one in the northeast, was described by an inspection in April as all but deprived of ammunition, and national production was an unresolved problem. The 3rd Motorized Supply Train Squadron was organized in February 1942 and the Moto-Mechanized Wing of the 7th Divisional Cavalry Regiment in the following month. Inland Pernambuco had the 21st Battalion of Caçadores in Caruaru.

The Fernando de Noronha archipelago was initially undefended. A Navy garrison was discussed in 1941, but the Navy's marines lacked the equipment for a proper defense. Admiral Alberto Lemos Bastos, commander of the 2nd Naval District based at Salvador, wrote in a letter to Vargas: "the occupation of Fernando de Noronha should be, I believe, made by the Navy. When I told this to the Minister [of the Navy], he told me the Navy couldn't do it". The garrison would eventually be provided by the Army. The 30th and 31st Caçadores battalions, earmarked for defense of the archipelago, began to be organized in Olinda and Recife in December 1941. Alongside the 1st Mobile Coast Artillery Group, 1st Group of the 2nd Antiaircraft Artillery Regiment, 1st Independent Howitzer Battery and supporting elements, they landed on the archipelago between April 6 and July 9, 1942. The 1st Mobile Coast Artillery Group was one of several new units of American-equipped coast artillery units in 1942. The 2nd and 3rd Groups, respectively designated for Natal and Olinda, would be created on June 26.

=== Raw materials ===
Brazil was also a provider of raw materials to the increasing demand of the American war industry, such as rubber, bauxite, beryllium, chromite, iron-nickel, industrial diamonds, manganese ore, mica, quartz crystals, titanium, zirconium, cobalt, tungsten, nickel ore, tantalite, columbite, and castor oil. Brazilian rubber replaced Asian providers cut off by Japan's entry to the war. An Axis occupation of the northeastern salient would separate the US from South America's natural resources.

=== Axis influence in the government ===
American officials were concerned with Germany and Italy's real possibilities of commercial, political and military influence in Brazil. Since 1937 under the fascist Estado Novo dictatorship, the country's political alignment was uncertain. US diplomat Myron C. Taylor described Vargas to President Franklin D. Roosevelt as "a dictator, even though a benevolent one", with "leanings toward the dictators in Europe". Decisionmakers in Washington deemed the Brazilian Army, which Vargas relied on to rule, as a pro-Axis force; William J. Donovan, Coordinator of Information, went as far as to inform Roosevelt an anti-Axis policy by Vargas would result in an Army rebellion.

Donovan claimed Vargas kept pro-Nazi officers in their posts — Dutra, his aide Filinto Müller and Góis Monteiro — as an "insurance" for an Axis victory in the war. On the other hand, the Estado Novo's Minister of Foreign Affairs, Osvaldo Aranha, was pro-American. Dutra's and Góis Monteiro's germanophile attitudes are recognized by Brazilian historians of several political currents; the latter even declared general Miller, Chief of the U.S. Military Mission to Brazil, persona non grata, but also played an important role in the Brazil-US military rapprochement.

On the December 18 presidential report, Donovan noted "The army commander at Natal, who is known to be pro-Nazi, in a recent address, cautioned his troops to be on the alert and to 'look upon our flag—our forces will never permit any other to wave higher than ours.'" He estimated higher officers in the Army were 70% pro-Axis, although the Navy and Air Force were pro-Allied. Numerous Army officers sympathized with the Wehrmacht or the Nazi regime itself. In the prewar period, when the Neutrality Acts of the 1930s restricted American military exports, Brazil ordered equipment for its Army from German industry. The US Army's predictions on Brazil were more pessimistic than the US Navy, which enjoyed good relations with its Brazilian counterpart. However, the Brazilian Navy exerted less political influence than the Army.

Brazilian military leaders deemed pro-Nazi

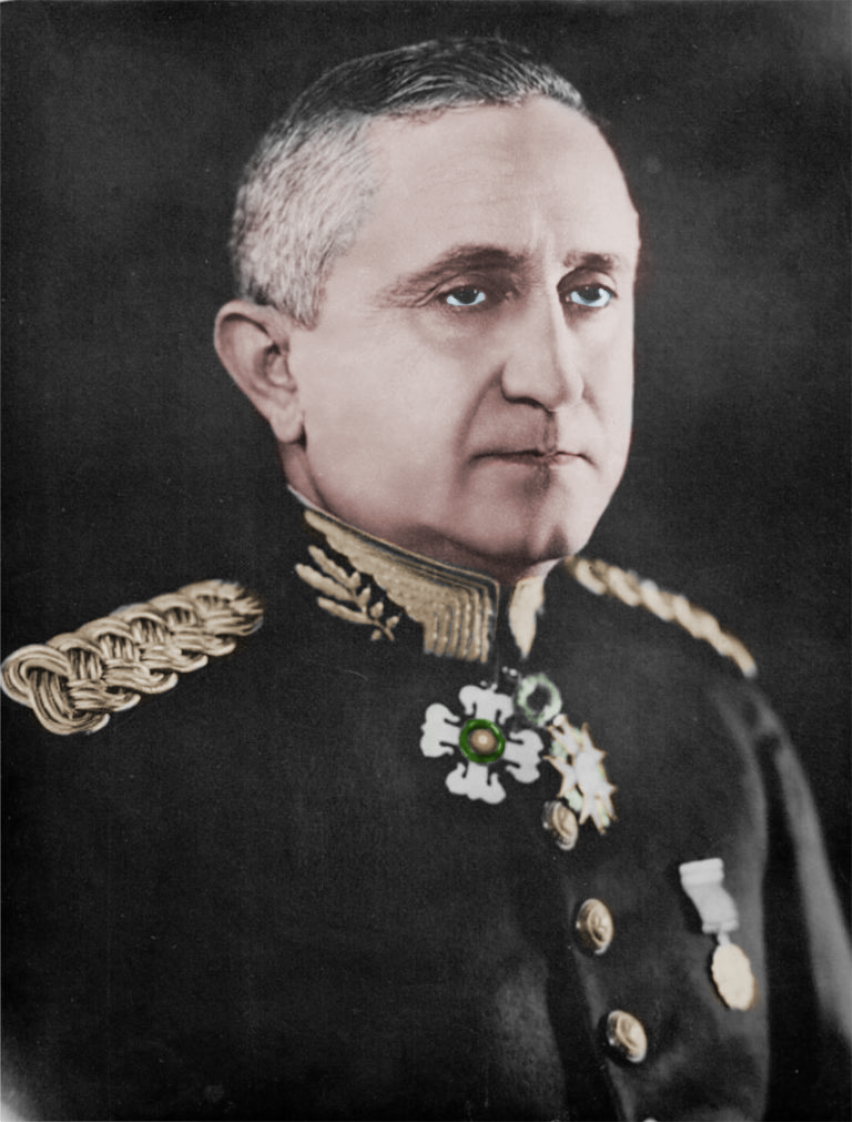
Dutra, Minister of War

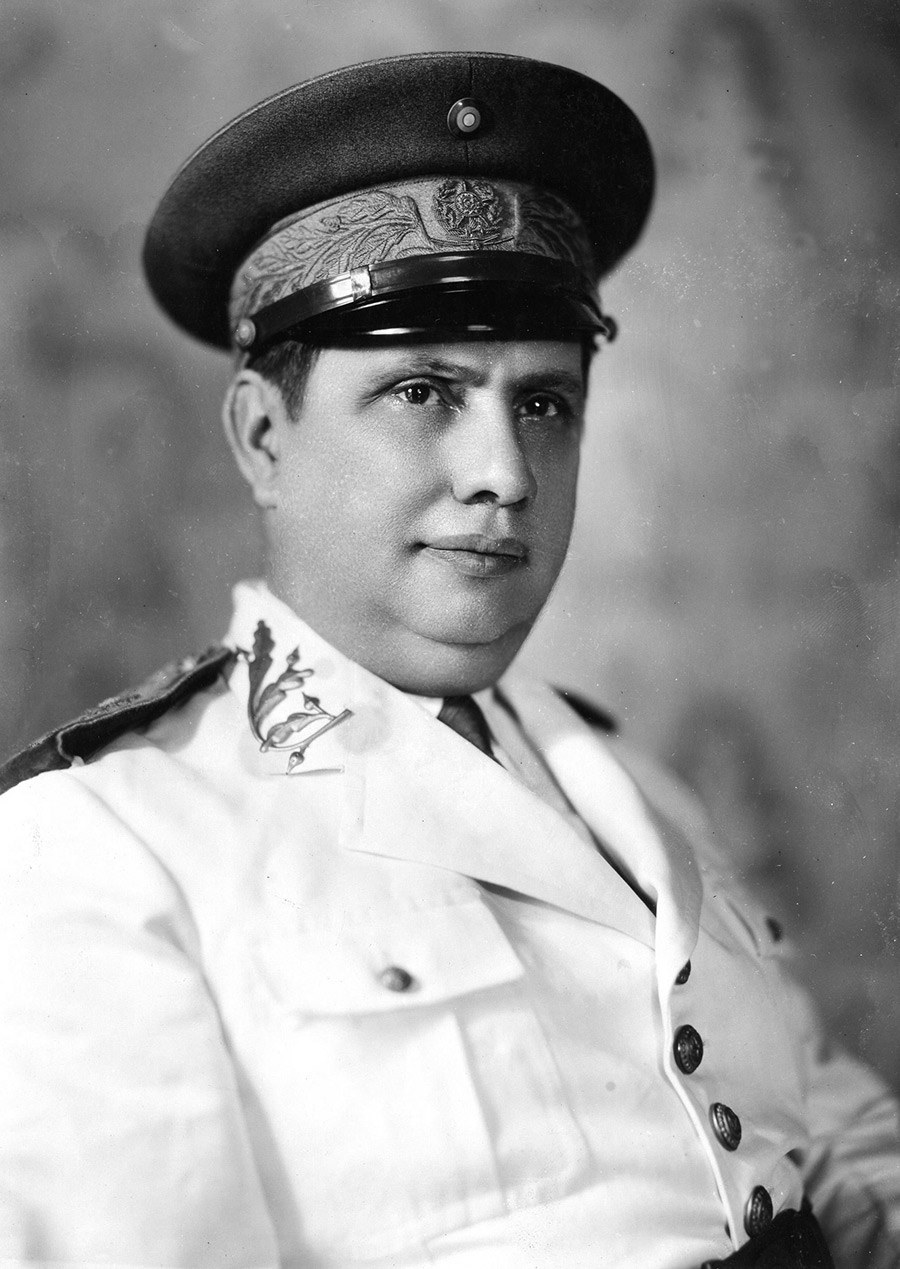
Góis Monteiro, Army Chief of Staff

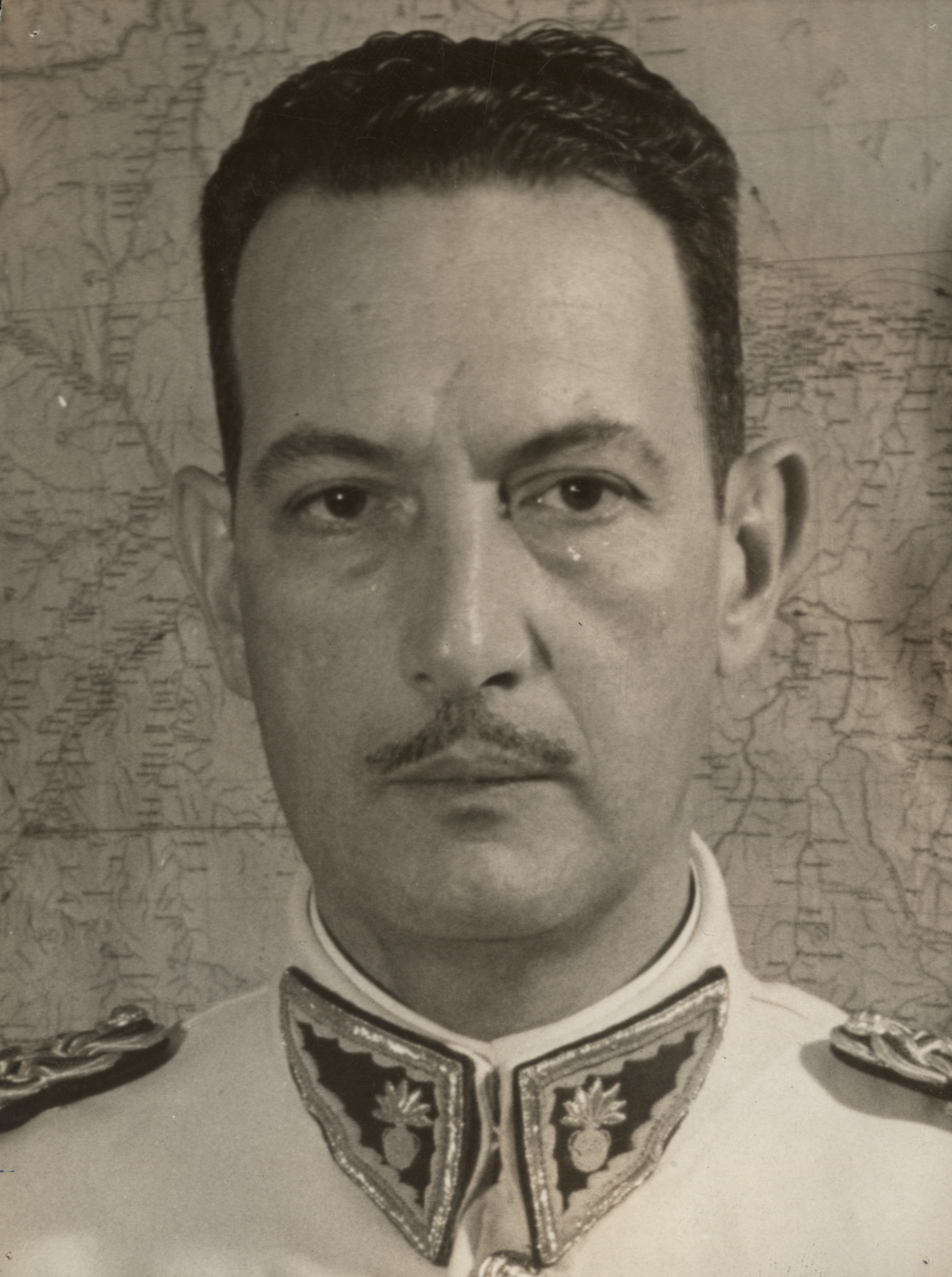
Müller, aide to Góis Monteiro

=== Axis influence in the population ===
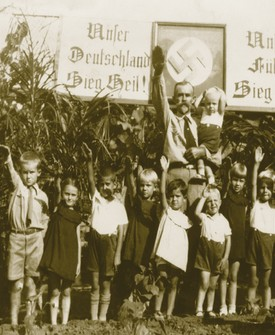
Brazilian Hitler Youth in the 1930s

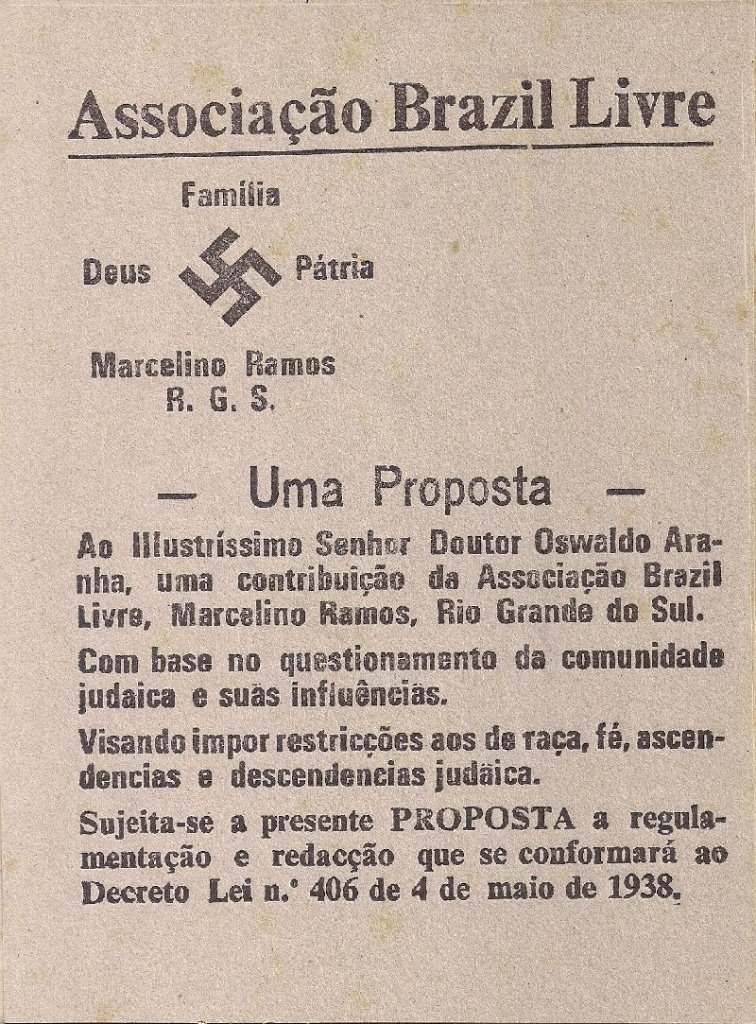
Rio Grande do Sul Nazis petition Osvaldo Aranha to ban the entry of Jews in Brazil, 1938

By Oswaldo Aranha's estimate, 10% of the Brazilian population sympathized with Germany at the beginning of the war. Agents of the German and Italian governments kept contact with immigrant communities, which comprised 1.519.000 inhabitants concentrated in the southern states of São Paulo, Paraná, Santa Catarina and Rio Grande do Sul. The Nazi Party recruited 2900 members across 17 Brazilian states. Bolder expressions of Axis support followed the Nazi invasion of the Soviet Union and its rapid advance on Moscow in 1941.

In January 1939, colonel E. R. W. McCabe of the American War Plans Division reported on German efforts to create a "core of pro-fascist Brazilians", such as frequent Portuguese-language radio broadcasts. The failed Integralist coup attempt in the previous year, he believed, suggested the future possibility of a German- and Italian-backed coup. A fascist regime in Brazil would destabilize Uruguay and Argentina, which also had large German and Italian populations.

Unassimilated German immigrant communities worried not just the US, but also the Estado Novo and Brazilian Army. The Brazilian government pursued a nationalization campaign by moving military units to the south, closing German-language newspapers and schools and banning Nazi Party activities. The Italian community was considered better-assimilated than the German, and therefore less of a concern.

== US-Brazil relations ==
Ministers Hull and Aranha, 1939: Brazil sought closer links between its army and the US's.

According to Leslie Bethell, "Germany's growing power in the world, the potential threat represented by the Germans to the US's hegemony in South America, Germany's economic and military ties to Brazil and, just as importantly, the existence of ideological and personal affinities with German Nazism in some sections of Brazil's society and government provided Getúlio Vargas with the opportunity to pursue a policy of pragmatic equidistance between the United States and Germany", making an alignment to the US a slow and gradual process.

Vargas maintained an ambiguous posture in the name of neutrality. His chief ambitions were to install a steel industry and modernize the Armed Forces. In early 1940 the US agreed to finance the industrial project, but the loan was small and came with an insistence on the participation of an American company in the project. Vargas was displeased and on the 11th of July, declared in a speech his alignment to the Pan-American cause, but also mentioned his government was willing to "look towards the political organization of strong nations", alluding to Germany. This speech was repeated days later. The American embassy reacted with real concern and pressed for greater concessions. Public opinion assumed Brazil could be aligning towards the Axis.

After Góis Monteiro visited Germany and Italy in 1939, American officials arranged a Brazilian visit for his counterpart, Army Chief of Staff George Marshall, and then hosted Góis Monteiro in the US as part of a mission headed by Osvaldo Aranha. The latter had been Brazil's ambassador in Washington from 1934 to 1937, when Vargas' self-coup brought him back to the Ministry of Foreign Affairs.

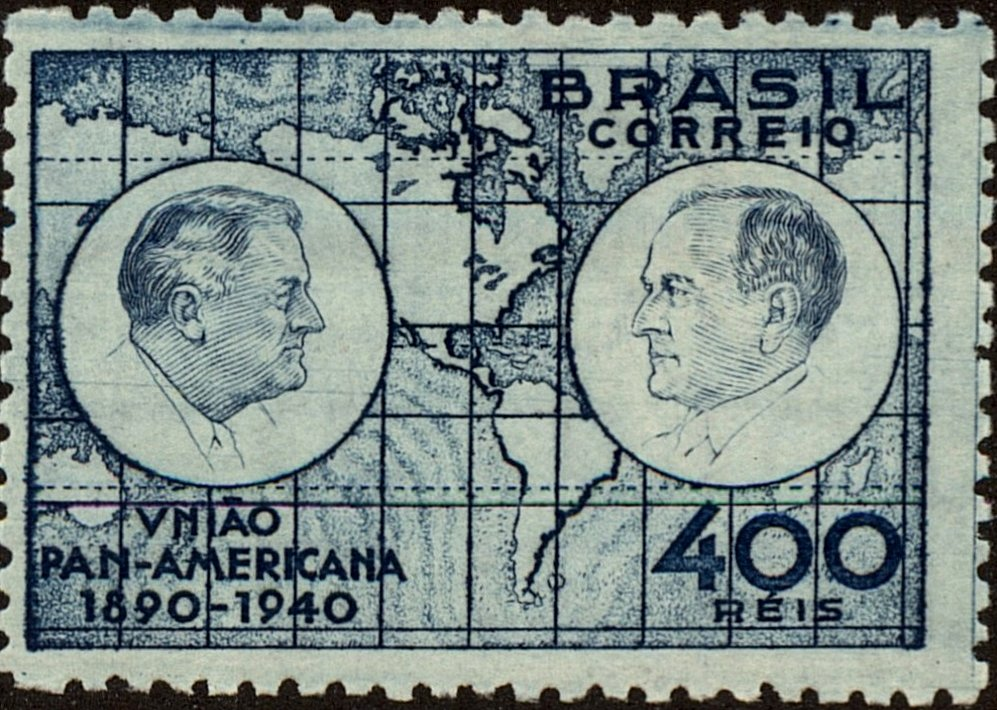
1940 Brazilian stamp commemorating 50 years of the Pan-American Union

In spite of distrust, several American military activities were allowed in Brazilian soil. Starting on 1940, the US Army constructed new airfields for continental defense and, when in they became operation in the following year, they were essential in supporting the British war effort in North Africa and the Middle East. Nevertheless, Brazilian garrisons in Natal, Recife and Belém were considered pro-Nazi by Washington. The government in Rio de Janeiro resisted American requests to deploy troops against potential fifth column sabotage or transcontinental Axis operations.

From 1940 onward, the US government stimulated Brazil's production of key raw materials. In autumn 1941, offers of a 100 million dollars in Lend-Lease military equipment and a 12-million dollar loan were conditioned to acceptance of a broad contract for trading these materials.

In September 1941, a memorandum informed the US Army's Chief of Staff that "Brazil will cooperate with the US on plans and preparation for a joint defense of the country but she will refuse to allow the US to occupy bases in the national territory so long as the Axis does not invade the country. Complete collaboration with the US will be held in abeyance at least until Brazil’s armament requirements are satisfied".

=== Economic and cultural overtures ===
Alongside efforts towards diplomatic and military rapprochement, there were several initiatives in the economic and cultural fields. Berent Friele's Bureau of the Office of the Coordinator of Inter-American Affairs (OCIAA) was introduced to Brazil as a counterweight to Axis propaganda, with offices in Rio and São Paulo and sub-committees in Belém, Belo Horizonte, Curitiba, Florianópolis, Fortaleza, Natal, Recife, Salvador and Porto Alegre.

In the field of information, the OCIAA promoted favorable press coverage and shielded it from the scarcity of printing paper facing most newspapers and magazines in the country. Radio programmes were produced for Brazilian radio stations, and in cinema, initiatives such as the creation of Disney's Zé Carioca sought the sympathy of Brazilian public opinion.

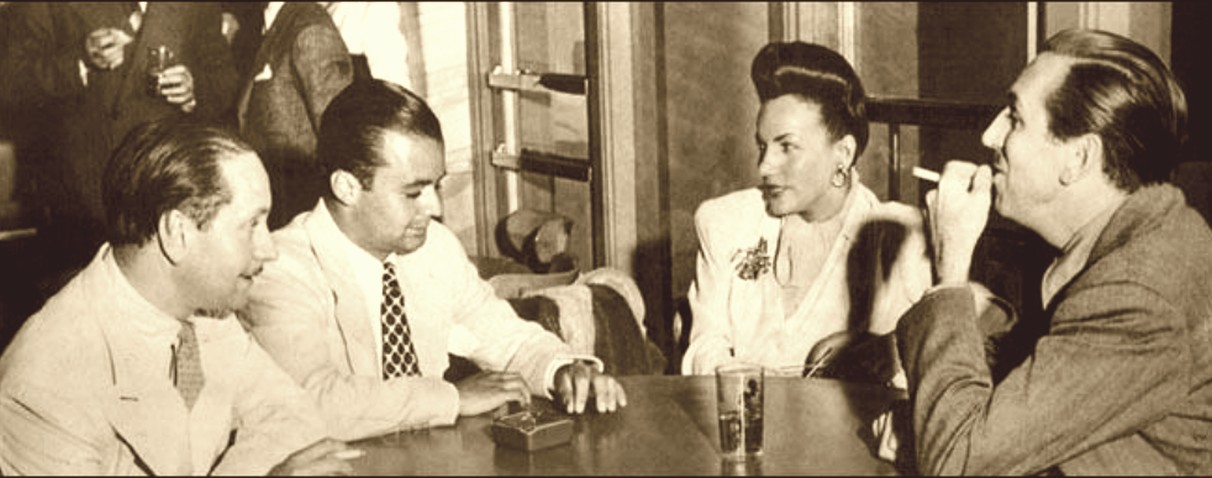
Jorginho Guinle, Carmen Miranda and Walt Disney in the launch of the latter's Zé Carioca

== Previous occupation planning ==
Góis Monteiro (right) with Secretary of State Cordell Hull during the "Aranha Mission", shortly after visiting Germany and Italy in 1939

An American military intervention in Rio de Janeiro was one of the cases presented in Plan Purple, one of the color-coded war plans of 1927–1930, but this scenario was poorly detailed and more of an intellectual exercise than an operational plan. A war in South America was considered possible, but highly unlikely. By the late 1930s the color-coded war plans and their unilateral interventions against individual countries were replaced by the broader Rainbow plans. In the spirit of the good neighbor policy, desired bases in the Quarter Sphere would ideally be negotiated with the governments of Mexico, Ecuador and Brazil. Should bilateralism fail, military departments continued to offer invasion plans.

The need to occupy bases in the Brazilian northeast was included in the Rainbow planos drafted by the Joint Army-Navy Board in November 1938. When discussing the Atlantic front of the Western hemisphere, the importance of the Brazilian bulge was a consensus among planners. In early 1939 the US Army War College began a secret study for an operation to prevent an Axis presence in Brazil. One of the college's committees produced War Plan Purple in the following year, presenting the scenario of a civil war in Brazil and an Axis invasion to back one side. Notoriously, there were three other committees studying Brazil's situation and none of them recommended an intervention, demonstrating a reluctance towards a direct involvement in South America, which would be logistically difficult and could be poorly received in American public opinion.

On May 24, 1940, the British informed the US of an apparent movement of six thousand German troops in merchant ships possibly heading towards Brazil, and in the following day the President ordered the Chief of Naval Operations to draft what would become the Pot of Gold plan. It is now known what happened to the purported invasion fleet. Colonel R. W. Crawford of the Army General Staff's War Plans Division proposed a 154 thousand-men expeditionary corps in Brazil and Peru in a September 19 memorandum. Another memorandum, dated September 25, argued for an occupation of forward positions in the Atlantic, from Bahia to Greenland, in no less than three months after a hypothetical collapse of the British Royal Navy. A January 16, 1941 joint Armed Forces directive mentioned the possibility of the Army being sent to Latin America to back local governments against pro-Nazi fifth column attacks.

The Army's "Operations Plan for the Northeast Brazil Theater" or Plan Lilac was approved by lieutenant-general Lesley J. McNair, chief of staff of General Headquarters, United States Army, on November 1, 1941. In the following December, the War Plans Division suggested the deployment of an infantry regiment and air defense units to protect the Natal region, transported with ships earmarked for the Azores. As soon as additional transports were available, this presence would expand to a reinforced division. Another document, the Joint Basic Plan for the Occupation of Northeast Brazil, J. B., Serial 737, was produced in December 21. Army, Navy and Marine Corps planners further developed the idea until February 1942. The Navy-marine amphibious assault was codenamed Plan Rubber.

Commenting on plans Rubber and Lilac in the Brazilian Navy's Revista Marítima Brasileira, admiral J. M. A. Oliveira observed coincidences in both plannings which suggest a real content of intentions and not just a thought experiment as commonly done in staff colleges. The Joint Basic Plan was approved shortly before the Arcadia Conference, in which British strategists agreed with their American counterparts on the relevance of the South Atlantic air route.

=== Purple (1927–1930) ===
Plan Purple had a directive for each South American country, all of them specifying a strategic area to conquer, alongside a naval blockade, with no planning for an occupation and counterinsurgency. In Brazil's case, the likely landing zones would be in Copacabana and Cape Gávea, followed by an advance to high ground to their north and northwest. The Brazilian Army's combat efficiency was judged average, comparable to Uruguay's and inferior to Argentina's and Chile's. Six divisions would be needed.

=== Pot of Gold ===
Drafted by the Navy in May 1940, this plan was premised upon a fascist coup in Brazil. It provided for an immediate airlift of ten thousand Army and Marine Corps personnel, followed by another hundred thousand by sea. The Navy would cut off Germany's lines of communication in the Atlantic with a contribution of four battleships, two aircraft carriers, nine cruisers and three destroyer squadrons. The occupation would start from the northeast and extend to the entire coast from Belém to Rio de Janeiro.

The Pot of Gold plan was considered impractical and eventually abandoned. According to military historians Stetson Conn and Byron Fairchild, the American government did not intend to activate the plan, in whole or in part, except in an extreme emergency and with the Brazilian government's consent. The news would be met with backlash across all of Latin America, the US Army lacked units ready for an expedition, the Army Air Corps and airfields en route to Brazil did not have the capacity for an airlift of that scale and the Navy would have to transfer an unacceptable portion of the Pacific Fleet.

=== Lilac ===
Drafted by the Army, this plan was deeper than Pot of Gold and presented two scenarios: in "Premise A", the Vargas government remained in power and allowed US bases in the northeast. In "Premise B", those bases would be taken by force. The complementary Lilac - Rio Sector (Lilac-RS) plan approved in February 1942 expanded Premise B to a duality of power in Brazil: an overthrown Vargas government would retreat to the northeast under American protection, while pro-Axis forces controlled the capital. The greatest resistance was expected in German immigrant-settled areas.

In Premise B, a battalion of the 47th Infantry Regiment would conduct the main landing in the Natal sector. Brazilian defenders would be distracted by a feint north of the city, near Ponta do Jenipabu, while the real landing would happen to the south, where an infantry battalion in Cape Negra, north of the Pitimbu River, would move through the beach and roads to the city. Other elements of the regiment would be used in simultaneous landings in Fortaleza, Camocim and Fernando de Noronha, each one with a high-speed transport. The 60th Infantry Regiment would land in São Luís do Maranhão and in Pinheiro, Belém sector, in which the Abaeté air field would be destroyed or occupied. 55 men would be sent by air to present-day Amapá. The 39th Infantry Regiment would land in the Recife sector.

The American-controlled northeast would be organized as a theater of operations commanded by the US Army, with a general headquarters in Natal and a jurisdiction from Pará to Bahia, organized under the Belém, Natal, Recife and Salvador sectors. The air component would consist of a heavy bomber group, fighter group and transport group, a heavy reconnaissance squadron, medium reconnaissance squadron, observation squadron and support elements. For the Rio sector, the plan called for the occupation of airports, ports and highways starting from Campos, Macaé, Cabo Frio, Rio de Janeiro and Santos.

The initial invasion force would comprise 15 thousand men of the 9th Infantry Division, concentrated in Natal, followed by two reinforcement echelons, one of them comprising the 45th Infantry Division, of 19 thousand men each. Major general George Grunert of the VI Corps would lead the expedition. Total strength in the theater would reach 50 to 60 thousand men or a much lower number, down to a minimum of 3600, if Brazilian consent were achieved. In practice, naval transport limitations and the demands of other sectors mean an invasion with 15 thousand men would only be viable later in 1942.

== The invasion according to Plan Rubber ==
Plan Rubber was studied to the utmost details by Marine Corps strategists in Quantico, producing a two-part, 110-page document. Its documentation is available at the Franklin D. Roosevelt Presidential Library and Museum and the National Archives and Records Administration. (Note: Records of the Office of the Chief of Naval Operations, Plans, Orders & Related Documents, CINCLANT Oct 1941 to Dec 1942, Box 16. Rubber Plan) In broad strokes, the plan dictated an occupation of Natal, Recife and Fortaleza at first, and then Salvador, Belém and Fernando de Noronha. Natal would "be occupied and held in preference to any other area of Northeastern Brazil" as it had the most strategically valuable airfield at Parnamirim and would enable the interruption of enemy lines of communication. The Fernando de Noronha archipelago offered a potentially valuable landing strip built by Italian airline Ala Littoria.

=== Invasion forces ===
Command of the operation would be given to admiral Royal E. Ingersoll, Commander-in-Chief of the Atlantic Fleet, as its execution would involve warships, naval transports and marines trained for beachhead defense. Marine general-major Holland M. Smith would command an Amphibious Force which included the 1st Marine Division's Landing Force. As of February 10, 1942 this division still had less available ammunition than what the operation would demand.

The Army's reinforced 9th Infantry Division, commanded by brigadier general Rene Edward De Russy Hoyle, would support the marines and provide the occupation force. It lacked experience in joint exercises with the Navy and would have little use in beach operations. The Army's 45th Infantry Division would be the immediate reserve. On the 26th of December, admiral Harold R. Stark, Chief of Naval Operations, reminded Ingersoll that "the occupying forces will be required to depart from United States' ports within ten (10) days from the date the President directs the plan be executed". Troops and ships would depart from bases in Hampton Roads, Virginia, at a twelve-day distance from Natal. The warships would include battleship USS Texas (BB-35), carrier USS Ranger (CV-4) and eleven transports for battalions of the 1st and 9th divisions and their cargo.

Officers in charge of the operation

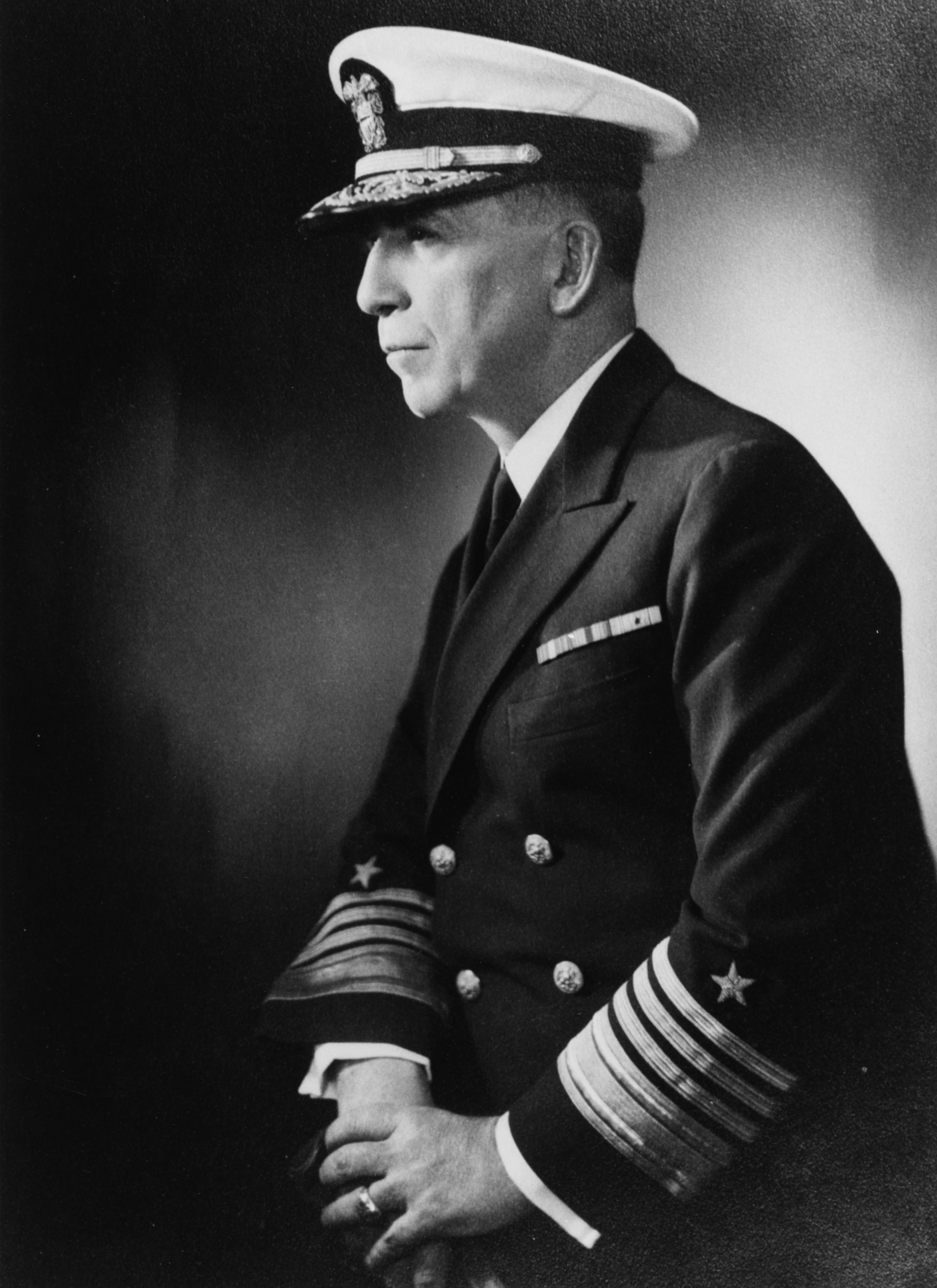
Admiral Royal E. Ingersoll, overall command

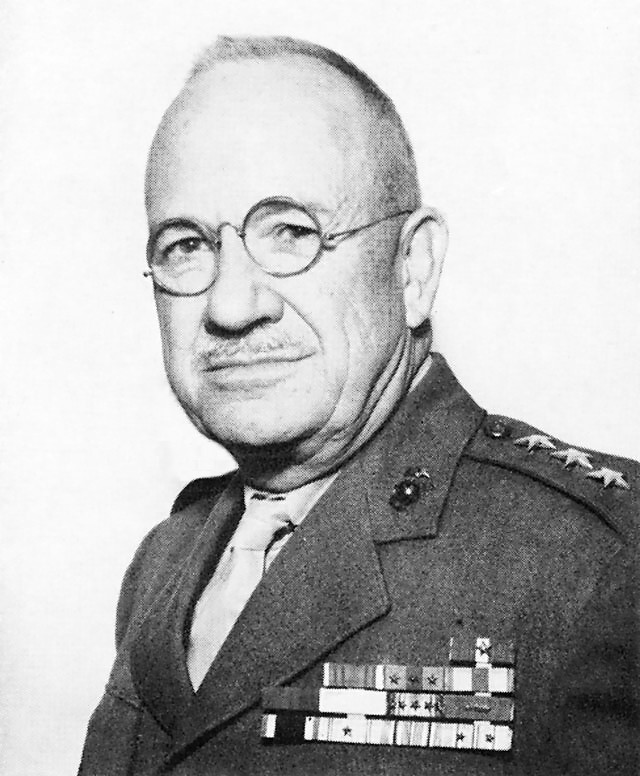
General Holland Smith, amphibious command

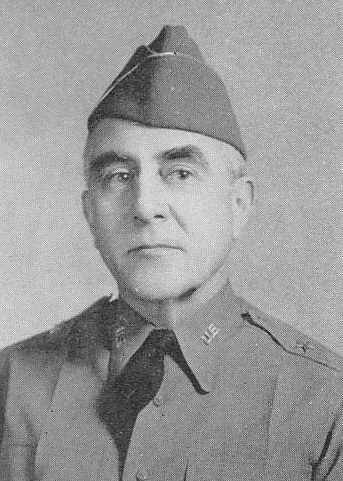
General Hoyle, occupation

=== Estimated Brazilian forces ===
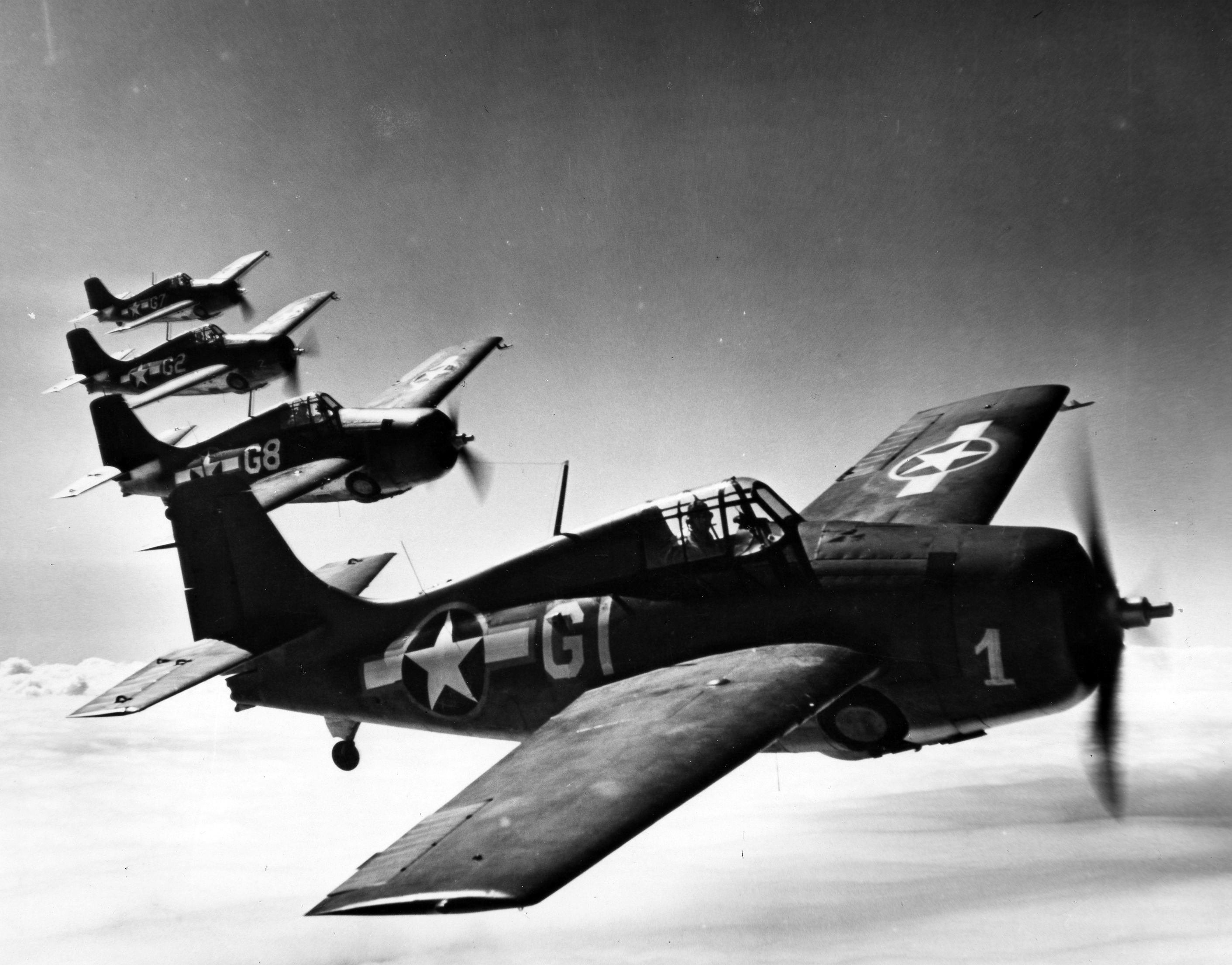
F4F Wildcat fighters would provide the landing with air support

Ground defenses were judged "probably insufficient", as they were equipped with obsolete weapons and over half of their strength was made of poorly trained recruits. Better-trained and equipped reinforcements were based in southern Brazil and a relief of Natal would take eight to twelve days to arrive by ship, which favored the invaders. American intelligence believed there were 1552 ground defenders in Belém, 2897 in Fortaleza, 3531 in Natal, (Note: 1305 from the 16th Infantry Regiment, 500 from the 29th Light Infantry Battalion, 226 from a guard infantry company, 150 from a motorized artillery battery, 200 from an engineering company and 1042 infantry, 95 cavalry and 13 other personnel from the Military Police (Gannon 2000, p. 63).) 5540 in Recife, 3453 in Salvador and 1552 in Belém. Fernando de Noronha supposedly had an unknown number of Navy personnel, as well as 65 guards of a penal colony, who only had side arms.

Planners had at their disposal two Navy observers (lieutenant L. K. Winans and ensign R. A. Cooke Jr.) and a PBY-5 Catalina patrol aircraft in Natal. It is perhaps for this reason they made no mention of the existence or absence of coast artillery in target beaches on December 21, when the plan was approved. They did, however, believe the Brazilians would use light artillery (machine guns and 75 mm guns).

The Brazilian fleet, composed of two old battleships, two old light cruisers, nine destroyers (including those under construction), three submarines and several smaller craft, was not expected to mount an effective resistance. Admiral Oliveira comments: "If, by any chance, there had been a successful American landing in the northeast, the first guilty party in the failed defense of our sovereignty would be evidently Brazilian naval power". The Air Force could be rapidly concentrated in the northeast, but was also discarded as an obstacle. Aircraft strength was estimated at 328, as follows:

- Boeing 256 (export version of the Boeing F4B, obsolete) - 12
- Attack bombers (Vultee V-11, NA 44 and Fairey) - 56
- VO fighters (obsolete) - 46
- VSB type planes - 3
- VJ and VR type planes - 98
- Trainers - 113

=== Landing conditions ===
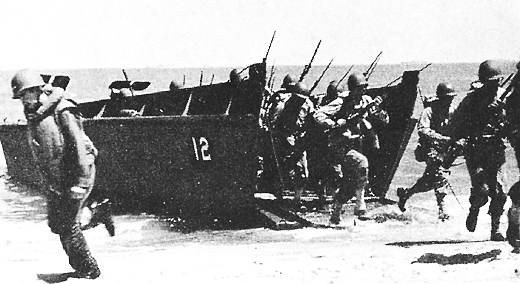
Marines landing from a Higgins boat

The plan detailed topographic peculiarities (hydrography, beaches, etc.), villages and cities and transport and communications infrastructure in the northeast as well as available Brazilian forces. Apart from Salvador, the geography in landing beaches offered many difficulties, which could have led to disproportionate losses in both sides. Marine planners expected 2902 American casualties.

There was a real risk of landing craft running aground on reefs, as happened in Red Beach during the 1943 Battle of Tarawa. Landing craft crews proved themselves poorly trained in the Janex-I joint exercise in Cape Henry, Virginia, on January 12 to 19, 1942. In general Smith's report to admiral Ingersoll, "Execution of the ship-to-shore movement during this exercise from a tactical viewpoint, was a complete failure". These were some of the purely military reasons against executing the plan.

Earlier landing exercises conducted in Puerto Rico and North Carolina in 1941 demonstrated the importance of naval bombing and air support. Plan Rubber dictated the neutralization of a beach area 200 yards deep and 4500 yards long. F4F Wildcat fighters would strafe coastal batteries and other defenses. Marines and their vehicles would advance to the beaches on LCVP ("Higgins") and LCM boats.

Todos os Santos Bay in Salvador offered calm beaches with smooth sand bottoms and easy access to the lower city and airport. The Amaralina, Pituba and Itapuã beaches were also viable in this sector. In Natal, the coast was blocked by sandstone reefs, but there were openings in six narrow beaches south of the port. Marines would land on the Meio, Areia Preta and Banhos beaches, codenamed "Red", "Black" and "Blue". Once the difficult landing was overcome, the road to the Parnamirim airfield would be easy. The US Army would probably advance to Fortaleza and Recife by railway and highway; it is not clear if there'd be a landing in these two cities, both of which had reefs along the coast. But the route by land was long, 270 miles to Fortaleza and 160 to Recife; if it were done on foot, the Brazilians would have time to reinforce.

Belém would be difficult, as the land around the city consisted of a swampy and densely forested alluvial plain. Its small muddy beaches could exact heavy casualties on a landing force. Safer beaches were further away and would require reaching the city through poor roads or the Bragança Railway. For this reason, the plan considered seizing the airport with Paramarines dropped from Martin PBM flying boats based on Dutch Guyana.

Fernando de Noronha offered only one viable beach, only 200 yards long, whose waters were rocked by swells even under moderate weather. If there were any defenders with heavy weapons, this would be the most dangerous part of the plan. A landing with rubber boats or airborne assault would be alternatives, but paratroopers aren't mentioned in the plan for Fernando de Noronha.

== Abandonment of the plan and Brazilian entrance to the Allies ==
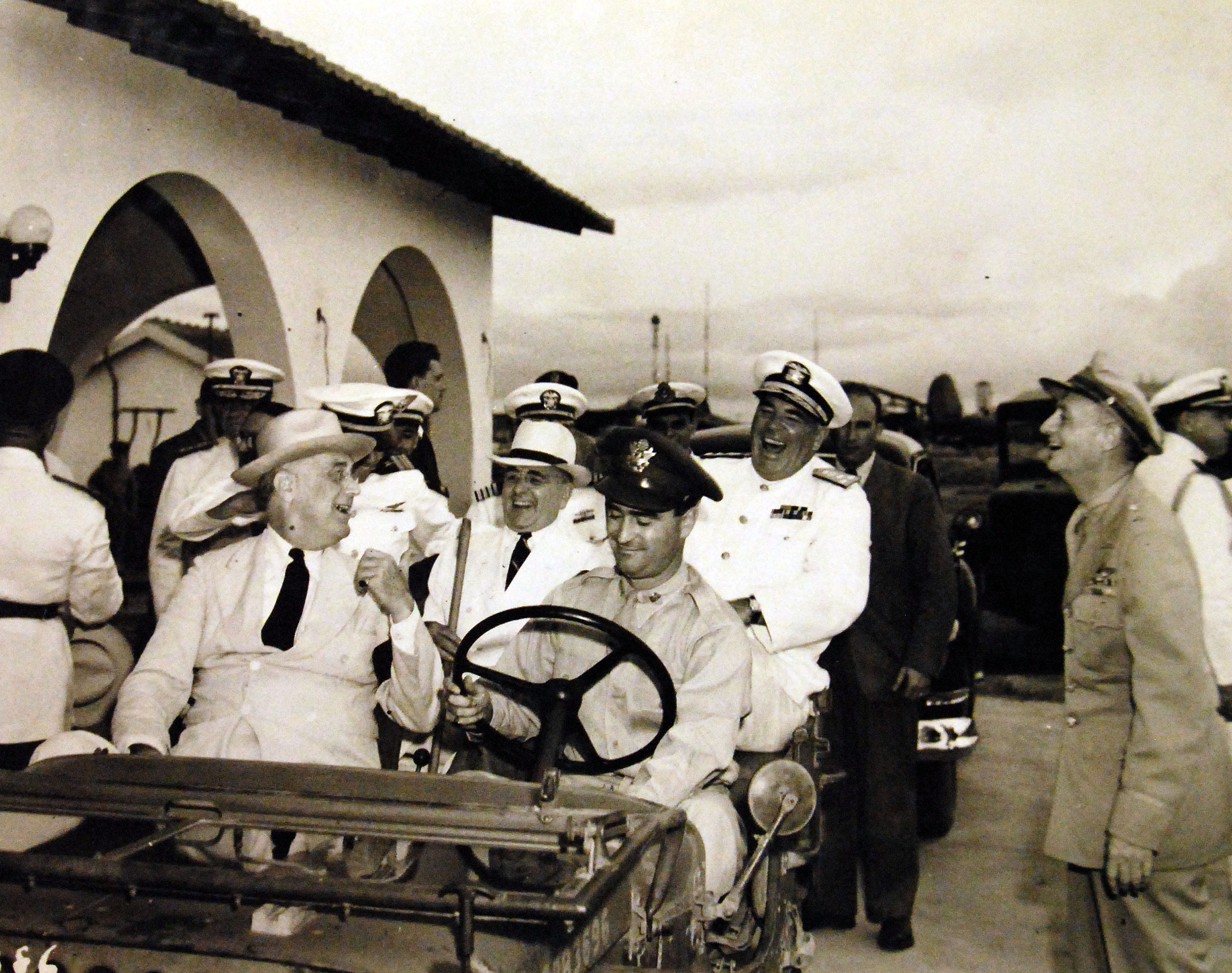
Vargas and Roosevelt inspect military facilities during the Natal Conference, 1943

While the US Army planned an expedition to Natal in December 1941, admiral Stark and general Marshall decided to send three companies of marines to defend airbases in Brazil (Belém, Natal and Recife). Under Secretary of State Wells assumed the responsibility to speak personally with Vargas to authorize this deployment, at the same time as a Navy representative refused the Army's invasion plan. Through general Gerow, Marshall sought Secretary of War Henry L. Stimson's support for the plan, but the latter, after consulting Welles and Secretary of State Hull, decided to suspend the expedition until Brazil responded to the Navy's alternative for a defense of the northeast. Brazil accepted as long as the marines came under the cover of "unarmed" aviation technicians. The three companies departed for Brazil on the 15th of December.

In January 28, 1942 Osvaldo Aranha formalized the interruption of Brazil's relations with Germany, Italy and Japan. Along with news that bases in the northeast would be offered to the US, Germany's ambassador in Brazil, Curt Prüfer, declared the country was in a "latent state of war" with the Axis powers. Retaliation came with the sinking of Brazilian ships by German and Italian submarines.

Brazil and the United States signed a new Lend-Lease deal in March 3 by which the latter would provide the former with US$200 million in weapons and ammunition, of which Brazil would pay 35% of the cost between 1943 and 1948, satisfying its demands for strengthening its military. In return, Brazil agreed to the construction of military facilities and arrival of American personnel in the Northeast, to allow flights through defined routes without the usual procedures and to extend the landing strip in Fernando de Noronha.

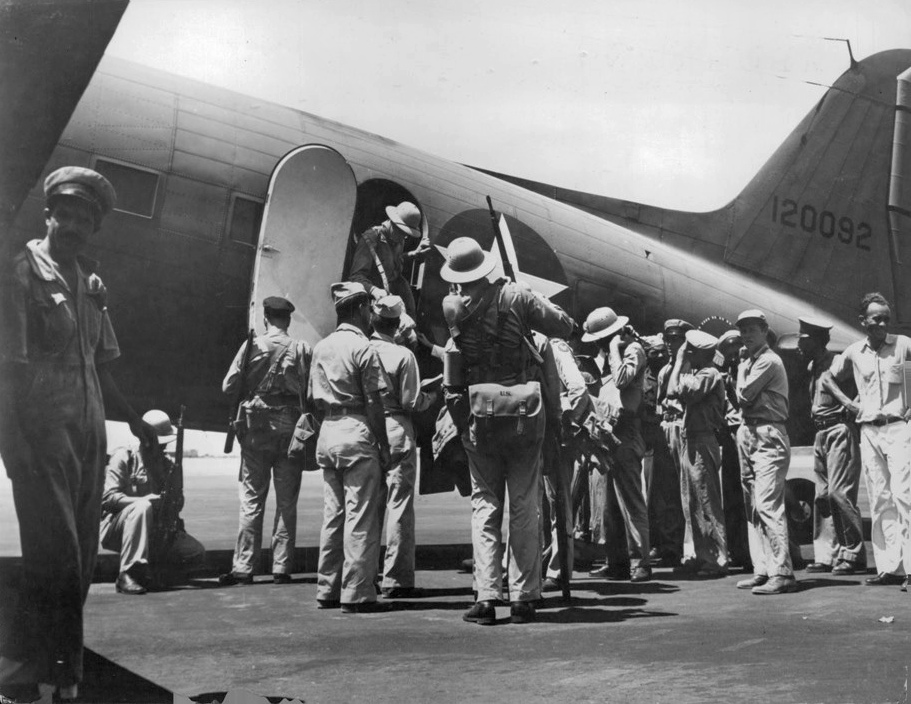
US Army Douglas C-47 at Parnamirim

Belated weapons deliveries bothered the Vargas government, but this did not stop both countries from signing a secret military cooperation agreement in May 23 by which two mixed commissions in each country would conduct joint strategic studies and the modernization of Brazilian forces. Vargas finally declared war on the Axis in August 31. According to admiral Oliveira, it was the sinking of Brazilian ships, more than Aranha's and Wells's diplomacy, which truly pushed Brazil into the Allied camp. Had negotiations proceeded at heir slow pace, an American military intervention might have been attempted.

The first flight of an American Boeing B-17 staged through Natal took place on December 21, 1941. For the remainder of the war, American aviation had unrestricted access to strategic bases in northeast Brazil, even though the US Army wasn't allowed to introduced regiment-sized or larger forces. 17 American bases of several types were established north of Rio de Janeiro. Parnamirim came to have the largest and busiest Air Transport Command base in the world. At its peak in March 1944, 1675 tactical fighters stopped at Natal on their way to the east. The opening of Brazilian naval bases also had enormous impact in the war. The US Navy established a small force of patrol aircraft, light cruisers and destroyers, named the Fourth Fleet in 1943, and Vargas integrated Brazil's Navy and Air Force into American naval patrol efforts.

== See also ==
- Rubber soldiers
- Military history of Brazil
- Operation Brother Sam

== Notes and references ==
=== Bibliography ===
- AHEx (2020). "Catálogo de destino dos acervos das Organizações Militares do Exército Brasileiro" (PDF) (in Brazilian Portuguese) (2nd ed.). Rio de Janeiro. Archived from the original (PDF) on 2021-04-18 – via Arquivo Histórico do Exército.
- Albuquerque, Edu Silvestre de (May–August 2017). "A importância do choke point de Natal no controle aéreo e naval do Atlântico Sul". Revista da Escola de Guerra Naval (in Brazilian Portuguese). Vol. 23, no. 2. pp. 511–534. Archived from the original on 2022-04-22.
- Child, John (May 1979). "From "Color" to "Rainbow": U.S. Strategic Planning for Latin America, 1919-1945". Journal of Interamerican Studies and World Affairs. Vol. 21, no. 2. Center for Latin American Studies at the University of Miami. pp. 233–259. doi:10.2307/165527. JSTOR 165527.
- Conn, Stetson; Fairchild, Byron (1960). The Framework of Hemisphere Defense. United States Army in World War II - The Western Hemisphere. LCCN 56-6000. Archived from the original on 2008-05-09 – via U.S. Army: History in 2/1/2003.
- Daróz, Carlos Roberto Carvalho (June 2017). "A artilharia brasileira e a defesa de Fernando de Noronha durante a 2ª Guerra Mundial". Tiempo y Espacio (in Brazilian Portuguese). Vol. 27, no. 67. Caracas. Archived from the original on 2022-10-19.
- CPDOC FGV (2001). Dicionário histórico-biográfico brasileiro, pós-1930 (in Brazilian Portuguese). Rio de Janeiro: Centro de Pesquisa e Documentação de História Contemporânea do Brasil.
- Duarte, Paulo de Queiroz (1971). O Nordeste na II Guerra Mundial - Antecedentes e ocupação (in Brazilian Portuguese). Rio de Janeiro: Record. p. 436. OCLC 1186665.
- Gannon, Michael (October–December 2000). "Invade Brazil?". Revista Marítima Brasileira (in Brazilian Portuguese). Vol. 120, no. 10–12. pp. 56–76.
- Lessa, Luiz G. S. (1982). The security of the South Atlantic: is it a case for "SATO" - South Atlantic Treaty Organization? (Thesis). U.S. Army Command and General Staff College. Archived from the original on 2024-05-01.
- McCann, Frank (2018). Brazil and the United States during World War II and its aftermath: Negotiating alliance and balancing giants. Palgrave Macmillan. ISBN 9783319929101.
- Moita, Sandro Teixeira; Gonçalves, Rogério de Amorim (2021). "Entre pescadores e canhões, a Guerra chegou ao litoral: a experiência dos soldados na transformação da Artilharia de Costa brasileira (1942-1945)". Navigator: subsídios para a história marítima do Brasil (in Brazilian Portuguese). Vol. 17, no. 33. Rio de Janeiro. pp. 141–156. Archived from the original on 2022-01-28.
- Moura, Gerson (2012). Relações exteriores do Brasil: 1939-1915 - mudanças na natureza das relações Brasil-Estados Unidos durante e após a Segunda Guerra Mundial (PDF) (in Brazilian Portuguese). Translated by Leandro Moura, Priscila Moura e Margarida Maria Moura. Brasília: FUNAG. p. 277. ISBN 978-8576314035. Archived from the original (PDF) on 2023-08-19.
- Oliveira, José Maria do Amaral (October–December 2000). "Quosque tandem...? Quo jure? A invasão do Brasil". Revista Marítima Brasileira (in Brazilian Portuguese). Vol. 120, no. 10–12.
- Watson, Stetson (1991). Chief of Staff: prewar plans and preparations. United States Army in World War II - The Western Hemisphere. LCCN 50-62983. Archived from the original on 2008-01-19 – via U.S. Army: History in 30/1/2003.
- Zagni, Rodrigo Medina (2008). "Armas e jogos. A política dos Estados Unidos para o comércio interamericano de armas no início da Segunda Guerra Mundial". Revista Eletrônica da ANPHLAC (in Brazilian Portuguese). No. 7. Associação Nacional de Pesquisadores e Professores de História das Américas. Archived from the original on 2024-05-07.
