= Sociology (disambiguation) =

Sociology is the study of society and culture.

Sociology may also refer to:

- Sociology (journal)
- Sociology Lens, previously the Journal of Historical Sociology
