= Tessler =

Tessler is an Ashkenazi Jewish surname, meaning "carpenter" Notable people with the surname include:

- Eva Tessler, Mexican-born American dancer and choreographer
- Jeffrey Tessler
- Nir Tessler
- Stacy Tessler Lindau
- Ya'akov Tessler
