= Rubber soldiers =

Persons of Brazil drafted to harvest rubber

Rubber soldiers (Portuguese: Soldados da borracha) were people in Brazil who were compulsorily drafted to harvest rubber in the Amazon rainforest during World War II.

The "rubber soldiers" program was a consequence of the Brazil-United States Political-Military Agreement during the war, after the United States was cut off by Japan from its major supply of rubber in Malaysia. About 55,000 persons were mostly transferred from drought-stricken northeast areas and contributed to the second rubber boom in Brazil. They were enlisted into the Serviço Especial de Mobilização de Trabalhadores para a Amazônia (SEMTA; "Special Service of Mobilization of Workers for the Amazon"), with support of several other governmental organizations.

Each migrant signed a contract with SEMTA which offered a small salary for the worker during their transport to the Amazon region. Upon arrival, they received a payment of 60% of the total profit which had been obtained with the rubber. The basic kit they received included basic clothing, eating equipment, a net, and a carton of cigarettes. After being recruited, the volunteers were placed in specially-built housing, under strict military watch, and then sent into the Amazon, on trips which could last two to three months.

For many workers, it was a one-way journey. About 26,000 rubber workers died in the Amazon, after having exhausted their energies extracting the "white gold." They died of malaria, yellow fever, and hepatitis, and were attacked by animals such as jaguars, snakes, and scorpions. The Brazilian government also did not fulfill its promise to return the "rubber soldiers" to their homes at the end of the war as heroes and with housing comparable to that of the military.

== See also ==
- Plan Rubber
