= Nils Jacobsen =

American historian

Nils Peter Jacobsen is an American historian specializing in the history of Peru. He is an associate professor of History and Global Studies at the University of Illinois at Urbana-Champaign. He is the author of Mirages of Transition: The Peruvian Altiplano, 1780-1930 and Political Cultures in the Andes, 1750-1950.

== Biography ==
Jacobsen received his Ph.D. from the University of California, Berkeley. His dissertation was entitled "Landtenure and Society in the Peruvian Altiplano: Azangaro Province, 1770-1920".

He is an associate professor of History and Global Studies at the University of Illinois at Urbana-Champaign. He also served as a Santo Domingo Visiting Scholar at the David Rockefeller Center for Latin American Studies at Harvard University.

Jacobsen's work has focused on the area of comparative rural history, the general history of the Andes region, as well as the social and economic history of Peru. He is the author of Mirages of Transition: The Peruvian Altiplano, 1780-1930 and Political Cultures in the Andes, 1750-1950.

== Works ==
=== Books ===
- The Economies of Mexico and Peru During the Late Colonial Period, 1760–1810 (Colloquium Verlag, 1986) with Hans-Jurgen Puhle
- Guiding the Invisible Hand: Economic Liberalism and the State in Latin American History (Praeger, 1988) with Joseph L. Love
- Mirages of Transition: The Peruvian Altiplano, 1780–1930 (University of California Press, 1993)
- Political Cultures in the Andes, 1750–1950 (ed.) (Duke University Press, 2005) with Cristobal Alijovin de Losada

=== Book chapters ===
- "Commerce in Late Colonial Peru and Mexico: A Comment and Some Comparative Suggestions" in Nils Jacobsen and Hans-Jurgen Puhle (eds.). The Economies of Mexico and Peru During the Late Colonial Period, 1760–1810. (Colloquium Verlag, 1986)
- "Livestock Complexes in Late Colonial Peru and New Spain: An Attempt at Comparison" in Nils Jacobsen and Hans-Jurgen Puhle (eds.). The Economies of Mexico and Peru During the Late Colonial Period, 1760–1810. (Colloquium Verlag, 1986)
- "Free Trade, Regional Elites, and the Internal Market in Southern Peru, 1895–1932" in Nils Jacobsen and Joseph L. Love (eds.). Guiding the Invisible Hand: Economic Liberalism and the State in Latin American History. (Praeger, 1988)
- "Civilization and Its Barbarism: The Inevitability of Juan Bustamante's Failure" in Judith Ewell and William H. Beezley (eds.). The Human Tradition in Latin America: The Nineteenth Century. (Scholarly Resources, 1989)
- "Liberalism and Indian Communities in Peru, 1821 - 1920" in Robert H. Jackson (ed.) Liberals, the Church, and Indian Peasants: Corporate Lands and the Challenge of Reform in Nineteenth-Century Spanish America. (University of New Mexico Press, 1997)
- ""Liberalismo tropical": The Career of European Economic Doctrine in Nineteenth-Century Latin America" in Edmund Valpy Knox Fitzgerald and Rosemary Thorp (eds.). Economic Doctrines in Latin America: Origins, Embedding and Evolution (Palgrave Macmillan, 2005)

=== Articles ===
- "Cycles and Booms in Latin American Export Agriculture: The Example Southern Peru's Livestock Economy, 1855–1920". (1984). Review of the Fernand Braudel Center. 7 (3): 443–507.
- Subverting Colonial Authority: Challenges to Spanish Rule in Eighteenth Century Southern Andes. (2005). Journal of Latin American Anthropology. 10 (1): 241–244.
- "Trials of Nation Making: Liberalism, Race, and Ethnicity in the Andes, 1810–1910". (2006). Hispanic American Historical Review. 86 (3): 631–633.

=== Book reviews ===
- Between Silver and Guano: Commercial Policy and the State in Post-Independence Peru by Paul E. Gootenberg. (1991). Journal of Latin American Studies. 23 (2): 448–450.
- Ethnicity, Markets, and Migration in the Andes: At the Crossroads of History and Anthropology edited by Brooke Larson, Olivia Harris, and Enrique Tandeter. (1995). Journal of Social History. 32 (2): 431–433.
- The Redemptive Work: Railway and Nation in Ecuador, 1895–1930 by A. Kim Clark. (1999). Journal of Latin American Studies. 31 (1): 244.
- We Alone Will Rule: Native Andean Politics in the Age of Insurgency by Sinclair Thomson. (2004). The American Historical Review. 109 (2): 577–578.
- The Plebeian Republic: The Huanta Rebellion and the Making of the Peruvian State, 1820–1850 by Cecilia Mendez. (2005). The American Historical Review. 111 (5): 1571–1572.
- Modern Inquisitions: Peru and the Colonial Origins of the Civilized World by Irene Silverblatt. (2006). Journal of World History. 17 (1): 107–110.
- Making a New World: Founding Capitalism in the Bajio and Spanish North America by John Tutino. (2013). The Americas. 70 (1): 99–102.
