= Mehmet Ölmez =

Turkish linguist, academic and Turkologist (born 1963)

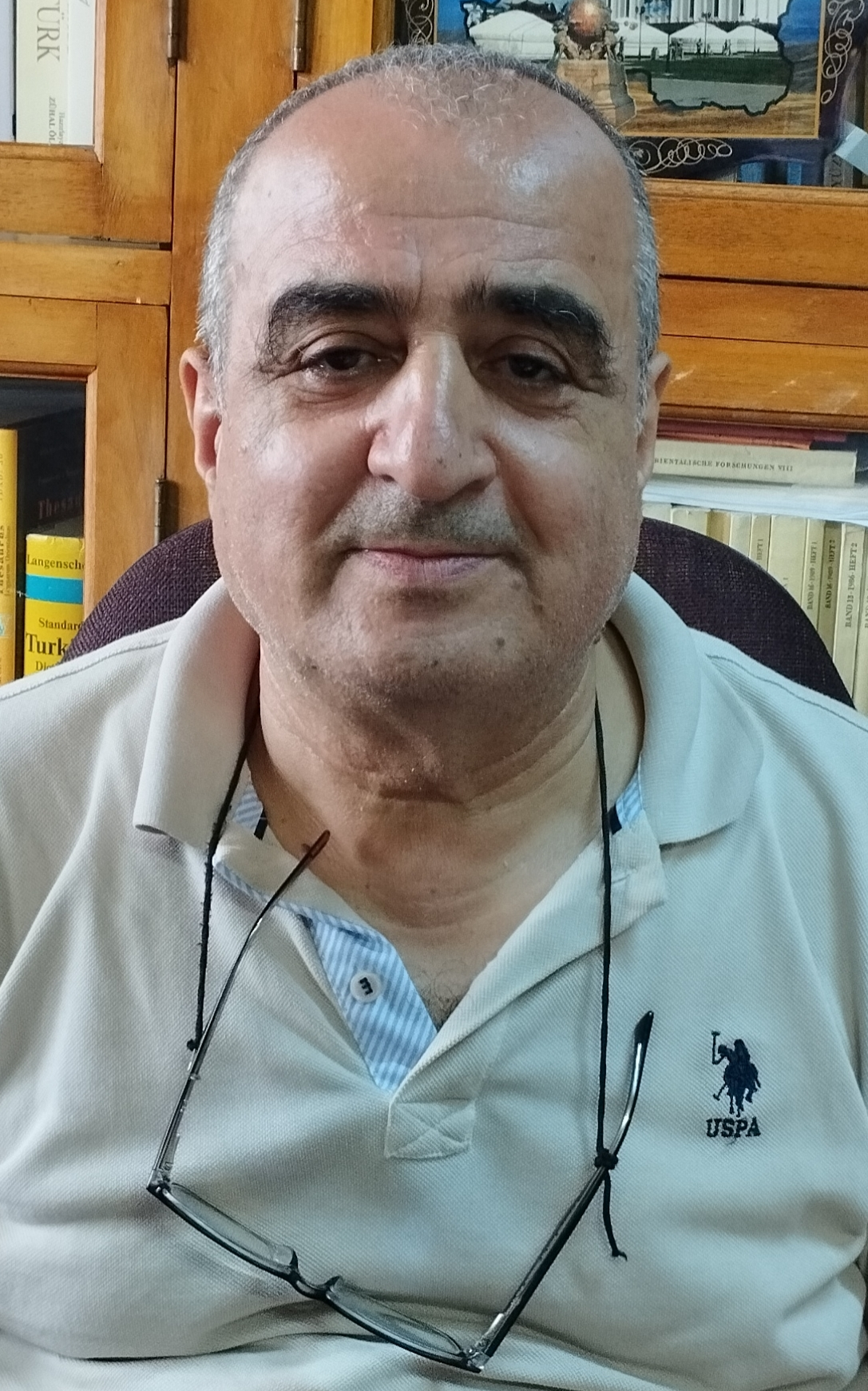
- Ölmez in 2025
- Born: 31 March 1963 (age 63); Uçhisar, Nevşehir, Turkey
- Education: Hacettepe University; Göttingen University
- Spouse: Zühal Kargı Ölmez (m. 1991)
- Children: 1
- Scientific career
- Fields: Turcology; Linguistics
- Workplaces: Turkish Language Association; Hacettepe University; İstanbul University
- Thesis: Hsüan - Tsang'ın eski Uygurca Yaşamöyküsü, 6. Bölüm
- Doctoral advisor: Talât Tekin

Mehmet Ölmez (born 31 March 1963) is a Turkish linguist, professor and Turkologist. He currently teaches oriental studies at Istanbul University.

== Life ==
=== Early years ===
Ölmez was born on March 31, 1963 in the town of Uçhisar, Nevşehir in central Turkey. He completed his primary and secondary education in 1969.

=== Academic life ===
In 1980, Ölmez was admitted to Hacettepe University in Ankara, where he enrolled in the Department of Turkish Language and Literature and studied English in a preparatory program for one year. He graduated in 1985 after completing his undergraduate thesis The Dialect of Uçhisar, Nevşehir Province: Analysis, Texts, and Dictionary, a study of the local dialects of Nevşehir. Later that year, he began his master's studies in the same department.

Between March 1986 and May 1987, Ölmez worked as an assistant expert at the Turkish Language Association. In 1987, he was hired as a research assistant at Hacettepe University. Under the supervision of Professor Dr. Talat Tekin, he completed his master's thesis, The Third Book (Fifth Chapter) of the Uyghur Altun Yaruk.

In 1988, Ölmez began his doctoral studies, and traveled to Germany in August 1991 after receiving a scholarship from the German Academic Exchange Service. After completing his German language courses, he performed doctoral research in Giessen from 1991 to 1993 under the supervision of Dr. Klaus Röhrborn, focusing on The Sixth Chapter of Hsüan-Tsang's Biography in Old Uighur. Ölmez also studied Sanskrit under Dr. H. Bechert in the Department of Indology, and Classical Mongolian under Dr. G. Doerfer in the Department of Mongolistics. He received his Ph.D. degree in 1994.

Ölmez received the title of Associate Professor in 1995, and became a Full Professor in 2001. He continued to work and teach at Hacettepe University until 1998. Between 1998 and 2000, he served as a visiting lecturer in the Department of Turkology at the Tokyo University of Foreign Studies. From 2000 to 2001, he was a faculty member at Mersin University. Between 2001 and 2018, he served as a faculty member at Yıldız Technical University. During this period, he was also a visiting lecturer at Boğaziçi University, where he taught classes in the Center for Asian Studies, the Department of Turkish Language and Literature, and the Department of Translation and Interpreting Studies. In February 2018, he was appointed to the Department of Contemporary Turkic Languages and Literatures at Istanbul University, where he currently serves as the head of the department.

In addition to his proficiency in English and German, Ölmez is able to work comfortably with sources in Russian, Japanese, and Chinese. He has a strong command of multiple Turkic languages, including Tuvan and Modern Uyghur. His research primarily focuses on Old Uyghur, runic inscriptions, Siberian Turkic languages, and Mongolian.

Ölmez has been a member of the Societas Uralo-Altaica since 1992, and of Academia Europaea since 2017.

=== Family ===
Ölmez has been married to Dr. Zühal Kargı Ölmez since October 1991. The couple has one child.

== Selected publications ==
Some of Mehmet Ölmez's publications are as follows:

- Ölmez, Mehmet (1991). Altun Yaruk III. Kitap (= 5. Bölüm). Ankara: TDAD 1.
- Ölmez, Mehmet (2007). Tuwinischer Wortschatz mit alttürkischen und mongolischen Parallelen - Tuvacanın Sözvarlığı Eski Türkçe ve Moğolca Denklikleriyle: Wiesbaden. XII+516. s. Harrassowitz Verlag Veröffentlichungen der Societas Uralo-Altaica - Band 72.
- Ölmez, Mehmet (2012). Orhon-Uygur Hanlığı Dönemi Moğolistan'daki Eski Türk Yazıtları, Metin-Çeviri-Sözlük. Ankara: BilgeSu yayınları.
- Ölmez, Mehmet (2017). Köktürkçe ve Eski Uygurca Dersleri. İstanbul: Kesit Yayınları. p. 566. ISBN 9786059408387.
- Ölmez, Mehmet (2019). Uygur Hakanlığı Yazıtları. Ankara: BilgeSu yayınları. p. 328. ISBN 978-6052229064.
- Ölmez, Mehmet (2023). Kök Tengri ve Yağız Yer Arasında. Kül Tegin - Bilgi Kağan - Tunyukuk Yazıtları. Ankara: BilgeSu yayınları. p. 160. ISBN 9786052229422.
- Ölmez, Mehmet (2025). Uçhisar Ağzı Sözlüğü. Ankara: BilgeSu yayınları. p. 120. ISBN 9786255800084.

== In popular culture ==
=== Books about Ölmez ===
- Karaayak, Tümer; Ayazlı, Özlem; Uzunkaya, Uğur (2023). Bilge Biliglig Bahşı Bitigi, Doğumunun 60.Yılında Mehmet Ölmez Armağanı. PA Paradigma Akademi. ISBN 978-625-6957-97-8.
