= Eva Tessler =

Mexican American dance professor

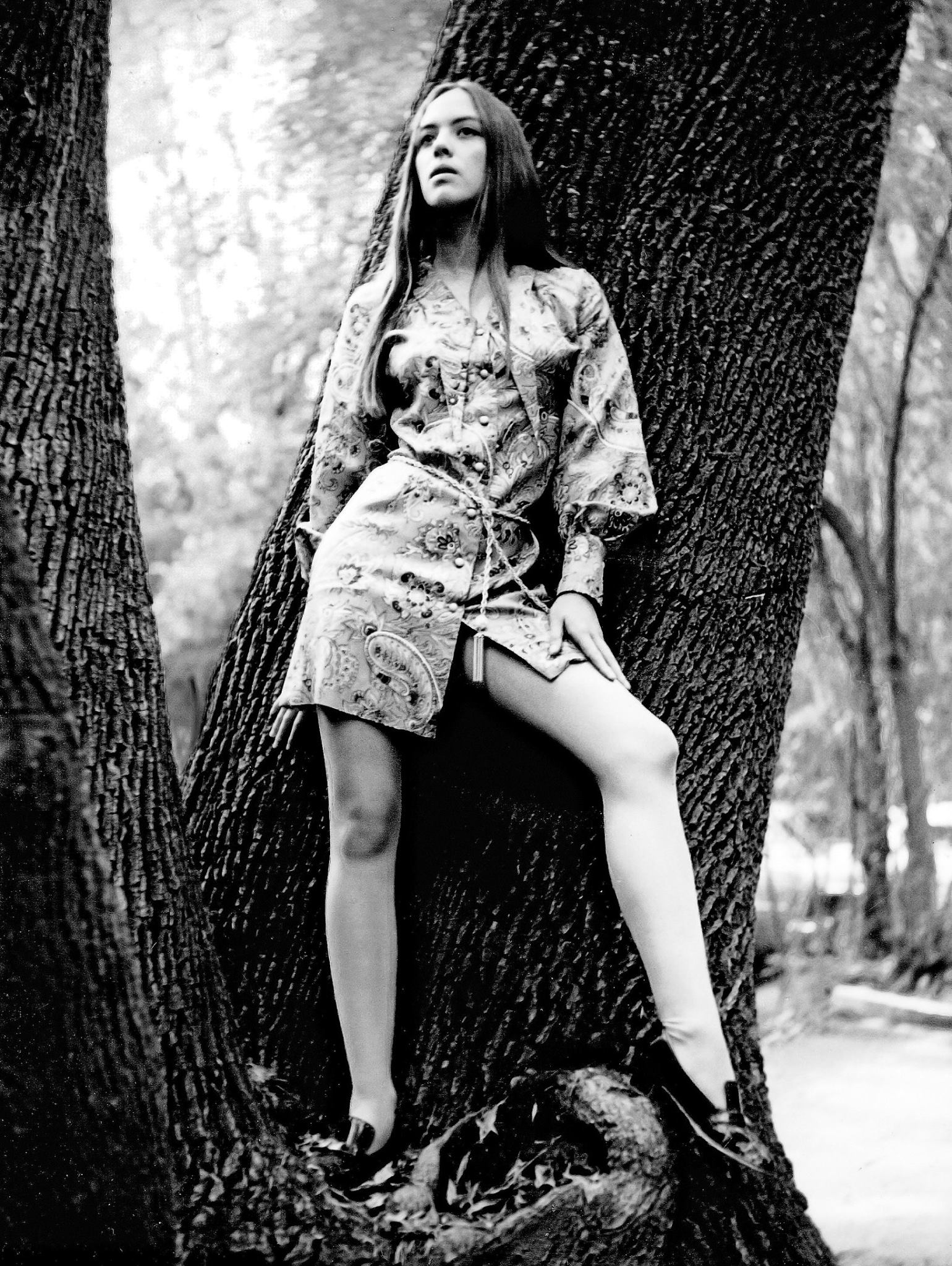
- photographed by Andres Volovsek, 1973
- Born: Mexico City, Mexico
- Occupation(s): Dancer, choreographer
- Awards: Albert Soto Latino Arts Award

Eva Tessler, aka Eva Zorrilla Tessler, is a Mexican-American dancer, director, choreographer, and writer who co-founded the Latina Dance Project (LDP) in Tucson, Arizona. Her work with LDP and the Borderlands Theater have served to create centers of creative expression for Latina/o artists in the U.S.-Mexico borderlands.

== Early life ==
Tessler was born in Mexico City. She studied philosophy at the National Autonomous University of Mexico, before moving to Brazil to work and dance. From there, she moved to Tucson, Arizona, where she received her MFA in performing arts from the University of Arizona. Tessler became involved in the political theater movement, where she met her future husband, the American anthropologist Daniel Nugent. The two became frequent collaborators and co-wrote the nationally touring production, 13 Days / 13 Dias: The Zapatista Uprising in Chiapas.

== Work ==
Much of Tessler's written, choreographical, and directorial work has focused on the intersection of women in politics, especially how race and Mexican-identity shape the experiences of women. One such production, New Moon Over Juarez (2006), adapted by Tessler from a short-story by Victor Hugo Rascon Banda and performed by the Latina Dance Project, focuses on a young maquiladora worker named Coyolxauhqui, who is tortured and murdered in Ciudad Juárez. The story is based on the more than 300 women who were murdered in the city between 1993 and 2005. In the play, Coyolxauhqui (who is based on the Aztec legend of Coyolxauhqui), begs her sister, an immigrant in the U.S., to return for her remains. The play ends with the body of Coyolxauhqui hanging from a circular swing. One review called her work "eye-opening" for its dramatization of "life in the pre-Obama" era.

In an interview with Tucson Weekly, Tessler stated that her work is meant to upturn stereotypes of Latinas in the performing arts. She stated, "Latinas in dance are stereotyped as doing flamenco or capoeira or folklorico. A lot of Latina women are working in contemporary dance, but they're submerged." In recognition for her contributions to Latino performing arts in the United States, the League of United Latin American Citizens (LULAC) awarded her the Albert Soto Latino Arts Award in 2008.

Much of Tessler's work in recent years has focused on her struggle with Parkinson's disease.

== See also ==
- List of Chicano dancers
- Baile Folklorico
