= Leslie Bethell =

English historian and university professor

- Born: Leslie Michael Bethell; 12 February 1937 (age 89)
- Education: University of London
- Occupations: Historian, professor

Leslie Michael Bethell (born 12 February 1937) is an English historian and university professor, who specialises in the study of 19th- and 20th-century Latin America, focusing on Brazil in particular. He received both his Bachelor of Arts and doctorate in history at the University of London. He is emeritus professor of Latin American history, University of London, and emeritus fellow of St Antony's College, University of Oxford. Bethell has served as visiting professor at the University Research Institute of Rio de Janeiro, the University of California, San Diego, the University of Chicago, the Fundação Getulio Vargas in Rio de Janeiro, the University of São Paulo and most recently the Brazil Institute, King's College London from 2011 to 2017. He has been associated with the Woodrow Wilson International Center for Scholars for many years, most recently as senior scholar of the Brazil Institute from 2010 to 2015. He was a fellow of St Antony's College and founding director of the Centre for Brazilian Studies at the University of Oxford from 1997 to 2007. He was lecturer, reader and professor of Latin American history in the University of London from 1966 to 1992 and director of the University of London Institute of Latin American Studies from 1987 to 1992.

Bethell is the sole editor of the twelve-volume Cambridge History of Latin America, a massive attempt at compiling and integrating the existing scholarship of Latin American studies. The entire project took more than twenty years to be completed. The work was praised widely, with the historian Paul Gootenberg noting that the series had "earned rave scholarly reviews throughout the 1990s". The Library Journal referred to the first two volumes of the series as "the most detailed, comprehensive, and authoritative work on the subject [colonial Latin America] available", while the political scientist Paul W. Drake called various volumes in the set "landmark[s] in their field." Reviews were not completely positive, however, with some of the volumes being described as "unwieldy" and skewed too much to the present age. Alternately, the series has also been criticised for its lack of coverage of issues whose impacts have extended into contemporary times and of the trends that had been emerging in Latin America around the time of its various publication dates.

Bethell was elected a sócio correspondente [one of twenty foreign members] of the Brazilian Academy of Letters in 2010. He was nominated to fill the vacancy left by the death of the Portuguese author José Saramago, and was only the second English person to have been elected to the position, after the philosopher Herbert Spencer in 1898. Bethell was also elected as a member of the Brazilian Academy of Sciences in 2004. He was awarded the Ordem Nacional do Mérito Científico by the Brazilian government in 2010.

== Selected works ==
- The Abolition of the Brazilian Slave Trade: Britain, Brazil and the Slave Trade Question (Cambridge: Cambridge Univ. Press, 1970)
- (with Ian Roxborough) Latin America between the Second World War and the Cold War, 1944-1948 (Cambridge: Cambridge Univ. Press, 1992)
- (ed.) The Cambridge History of Latin America 12 volumes (11 volumes published originally from 1984 to 1996, one final volume in 2008), essays from this work have been repeatedly repackaged in a multitude of forms put out by the Cambridge University Press. It is also published in Portuguese, Spanish and Chinese
- The Paraguayan War (1864–1870) (London: Inst. of Latin American Studies, 1996)
- Brazil by British and Irish Authors (Oxford: Centre for Brazilian Studies, 2003)
- (ed. with José Murilo de Carvalho) Joaquim Nabuco e os abolicionistas britânicos (Rio de Janeiro: Topbooks, 2008)
- Charles Landseer: desenhos e aquarelos de Portugal e do Brasil 1825-6 (Rio de Janeiro: Instituo Moreira Salles, 2010)
- Joaquim Nabuco no mundo: abolicionista, jornalista e diplomata (Rio de Janeiro: Bem-Te-Vi Produções Literárias, 2016)
- (ed.) Viva la Revolución. Eric Hobsbawm on Latin America (London: Little, Brown, 2016)
- Brazil. Essays on History an Politics (London: Inst. of Latin American Studies, 2018)
