= Sociology Lens =

Academic journal focusing on social issues

- Discipline: Sociology History
- Language: English
- Edited by: Ebubekir Düzcan

Publication details
- Former name: Journal of Historical Sociology
- History: 1988–present
- Publisher: Wiley (publisher) (United Kingdom)
- Frequency: Quarterly
- Impact factor: 0.767 (2021)

Standard abbreviations
- ISO 4: Sociol. Lens

Indexing
- ISSN: 2832-5796 (print); 2832-580X (web)

Links
- Journal homepage; Current issue; Online archive

Sociology Lens is a peer-reviewed academic journal, focusing on critical and historical perspectives on social issues. It was formerly known as Journal of Historical Sociology. The journal publishes research articles, review essays, and book reviews. Sociology Lens was founded in 1988 and presents review essays and commentary in its "Issues and Agendas" section, and aims to provoke discussion and debate.

== Abstracting and indexing ==
Sociology Lens is abstracted and indexed in the Social Sciences Citation Index. According to the Journal Citation Reports, it has a 2017 impact factor of 0.767.
