= Suffrage =

Right to vote in public and political elections

Suffrage

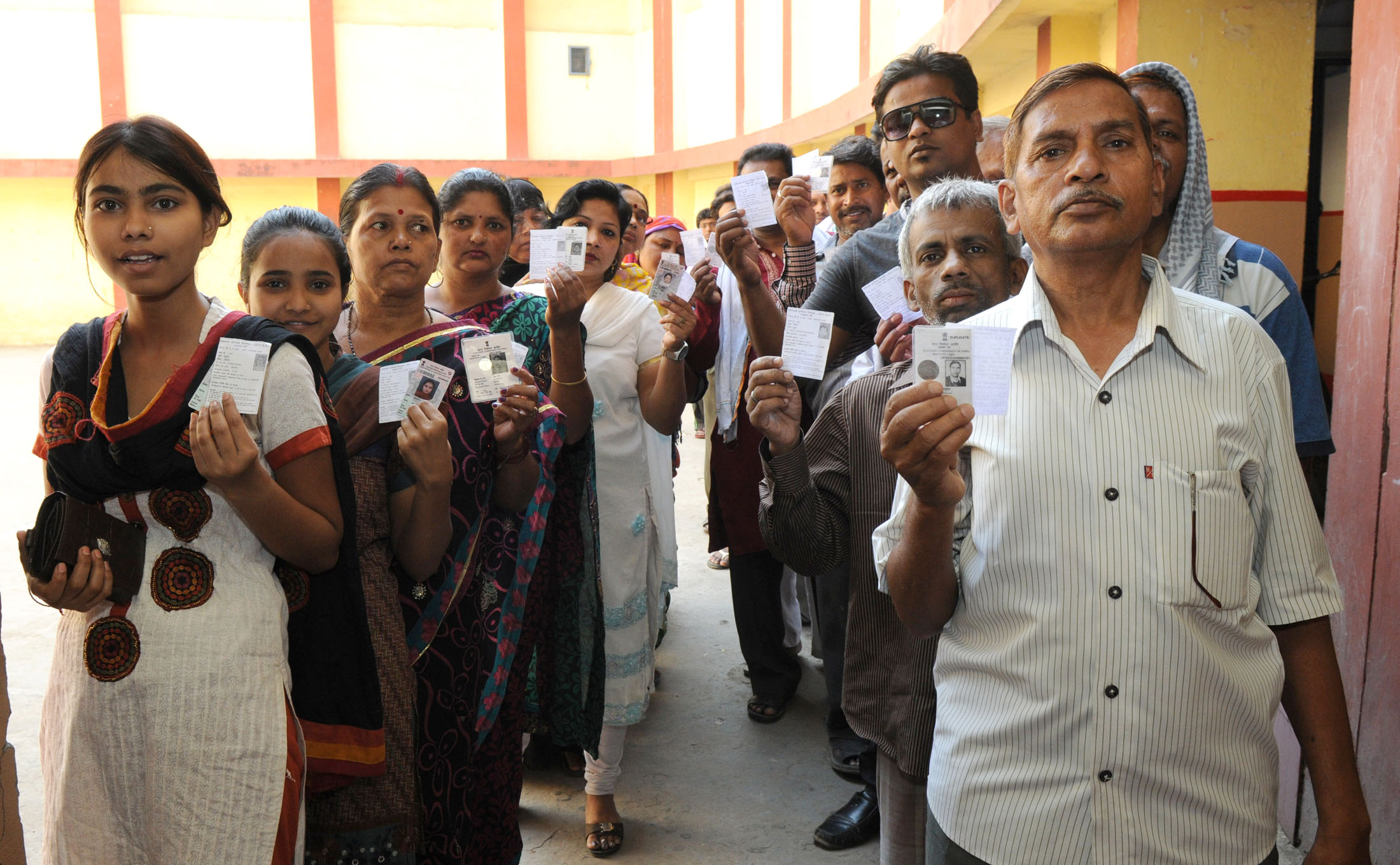
People queuing and showing their identity documents for voting in the 2014 Indian general election

Suffrage, political franchise, or simply franchise is the right to vote in public political elections and referendums (although the term is sometimes used for any right to vote). In some languages, and occasionally in English, the right to vote is called active suffrage, as distinct from passive suffrage, which is the right to stand for election. The combination of active and passive suffrage is sometimes called "full suffrage".

In most democracies, eligible voters can vote in elections for representatives. Voting on issues by referendum (direct democracy) may also be available. For example, in Switzerland, this is permitted at all levels of government. In the United States, some states allow citizens the opportunity to write, propose, and vote on referendums (popular initiatives); other states and the federal government do not. Referendums in the United Kingdom are rare.

Suffrage continues to be especially restricted on the basis of age, residency and citizenship status in many places. In some countries additional restrictions exist. In Great Britain and the United States a felon might lose the right to vote. In some countries being under guardianship may restrict the right to vote. Non-resident citizen voting allows emigrants and expatriates of some countries to vote in their home country. Resident non-citizens can vote in some countries, which may be restricted to citizens of closely linked countries (e.g., Commonwealth citizens and European Union citizens) or to certain offices or questions. Multiple citizenship typically allows to vote in multiple countries. Historically the right to vote was more restricted, for example by gender, race, or wealth.

== Etymology ==
The word suffrage comes from Latin suffragium, which initially meant "a voting-tablet", "a ballot", "a vote", or "the right to vote". Suffragium in the second century and later came to mean "political patronage, influence, interest, or support", and sometimes "popular acclaim" or "applause". By the fourth century the word was used for "an intercession", asking a patron for their influence with the Almighty. Suffragium was used in the fifth and sixth centuries with connection to buying influence or profiteering from appointing to office, and eventually the word referred to the bribe itself. William Smith rejects the connection of suffragium to sub "under" + fragor "crash, din, shouts (as of approval)", related to frangere "to break"; Eduard Wunder writes that the word may be related to suffrago, signifying an ankle bone or knuckle bone. In the 17th century the English suffrage regained the earlier meaning of the Latin suffragium, "a vote" or "the right to vote".

== Types ==
=== Universal suffrage ===
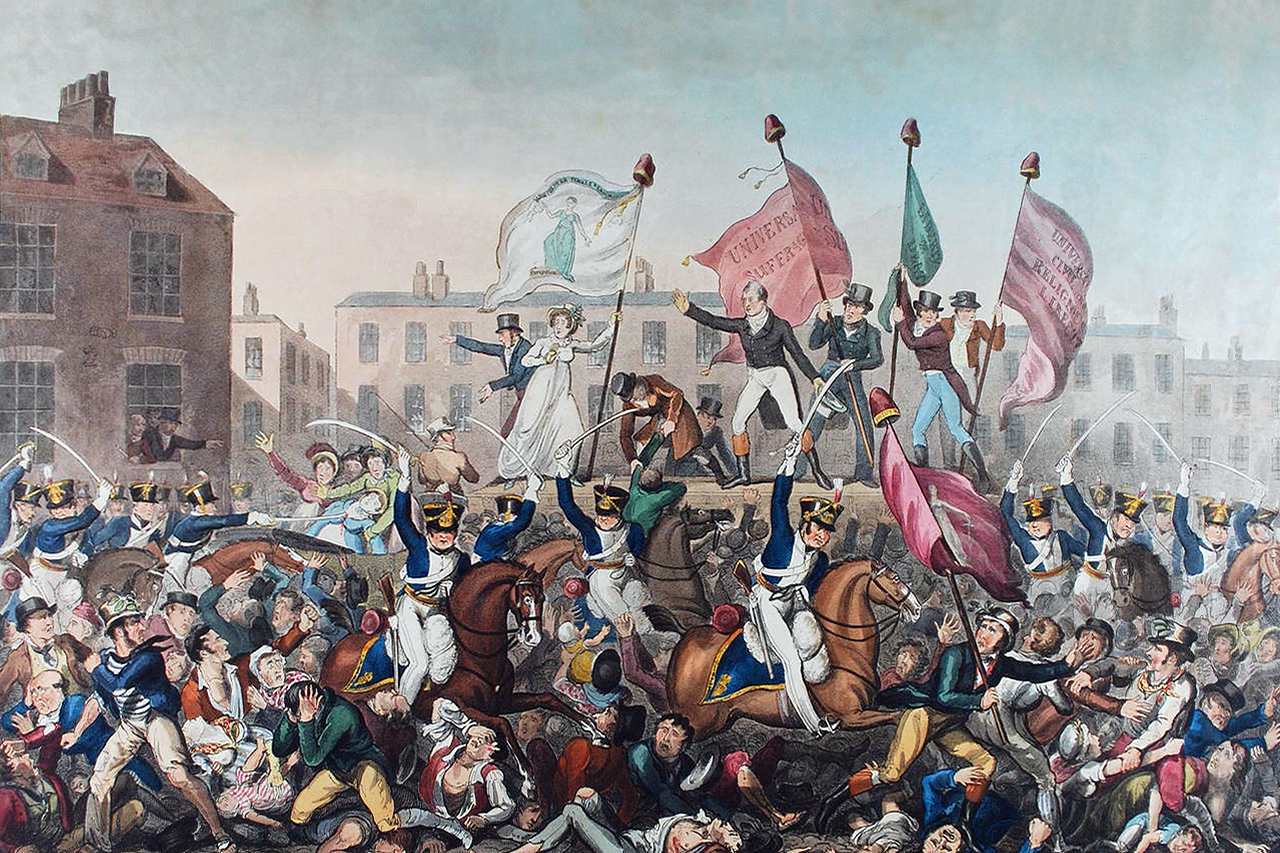
The Peterloo Massacre of 1819

Universal suffrage would be achieved when all have the right to vote without restriction. It could, for example, look like a system where everyone was presumed to have the right to vote unless a government can prove beyond a reasonable doubt the need to revoke voting rights. The trend towards universal suffrage has progressed in some democracies by eliminating some or all of the voting restrictions due to gender, race, religion, social status, education level, wealth, citizenship, ability and age. However, throughout history the term universal suffrage has meant different things, with the different assumptions about the groups that were or were not deemed desirable voters.

==== Early history ====
The short-lived Corsican Republic (1755–1769) was the first country to grant limited universal suffrage to all citizens over the age of 25.

In 1819, 60–80,000 women and men from 30 miles around Manchester assembled in the city's St. Peter's Square to protest their lack of any representation in the Houses of Parliament. Historian Robert Poole has called the Peterloo Massacre one of the defining moments of its age. (The eponymous Peterloo film featured a scene of women suffragists planning their contribution to the protest.) At that time Manchester had a population of around 140,000 and the population totals of Greater Manchester were around 490,000.

This was followed by other experiments in the Paris Commune of 1871 and the island republic of Franceville (1889). From 1840 to 1852, the Kingdom of Hawai'i granted universal suffrage without mention of sex. In 1893, when the Kingdom of Hawai'i was overthrown in a coup, New Zealand was the only independent country to practice universal (active) suffrage, and the Freedom in the World index lists New Zealand as the only free country in the world in 1893.

==== Women's suffrage ====
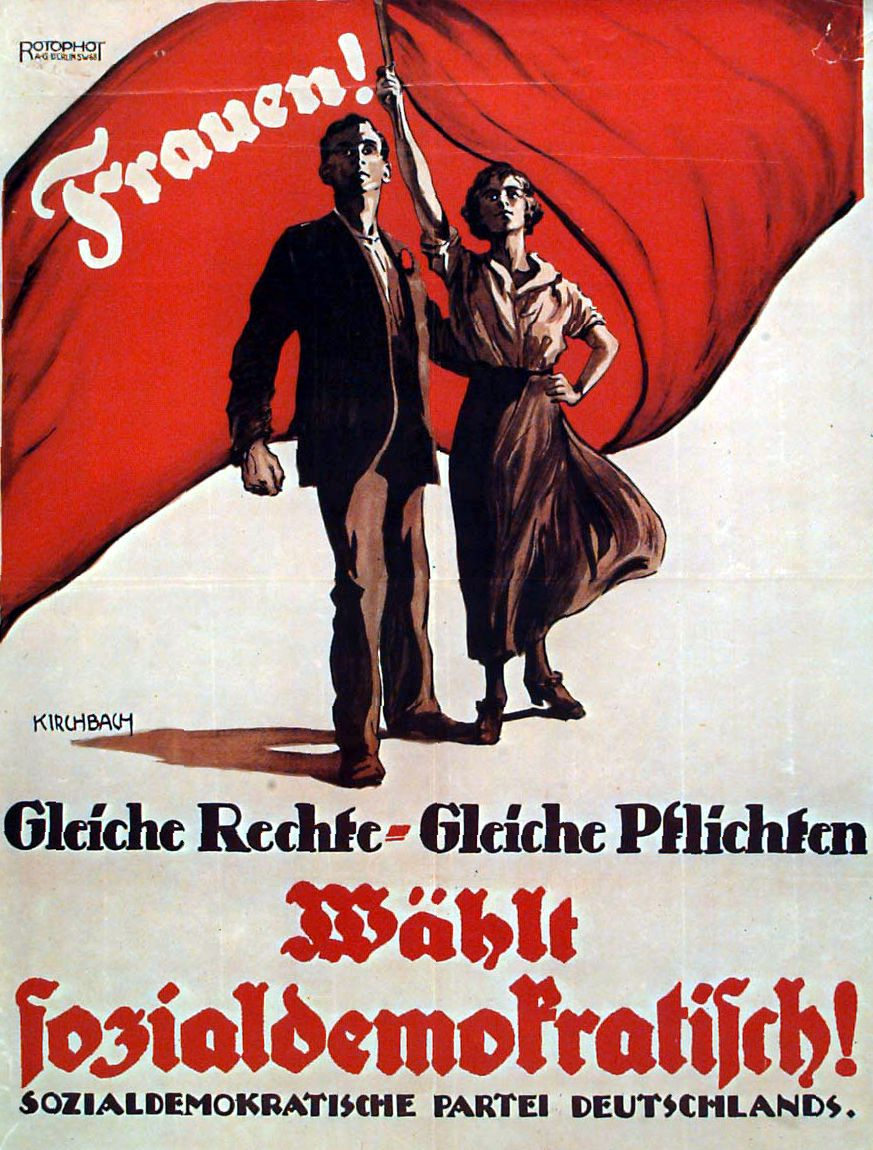
German election poster from 1919: Equal rights – equal duties!

Women's suffrage is the right of women to vote. This was the goal of the suffragists, who believed in using legal means, as well as the suffragettes, who used extremist measures. Short-lived suffrage equity was drafted into provisions of the State of New Jersey's first, 1776 Constitution, which extended the Right to Vote to unwed female landholders and black land owners.

IV. That all inhabitants of this Colony, of full age, who are worth fifty pounds proclamation money, clear estate in the same, and have resided within the county in which they claim a vote for twelve months immediately preceding the election, shall be entitled to vote for Representatives in Council and Assembly; and also for all other public officers, that shall be elected by the people of the county at large. New Jersey 1776

However, the document did not specify an Amendment procedure, and the provision was subsequently replaced in 1844 by the adoption of the succeeding constitution, which reverted to "all white male" suffrage restrictions.

Although the Kingdom of Hawai'i granted female suffrage in 1840, the right was rescinded in 1852. Limited voting rights were gained by some women in Sweden, Britain, and some western U.S. states in the 1860s. In 1893, the British colony of New Zealand became the first self-governing nation to extend the right to vote to all adult women. In 1894, the women of South Australia achieved the right to both vote and stand for Parliament. The autonomous Grand Duchy of Finland in the Russian Empire was the first nation to allow all women to both vote and run for parliament.

==== Anti-women's suffrage propaganda ====
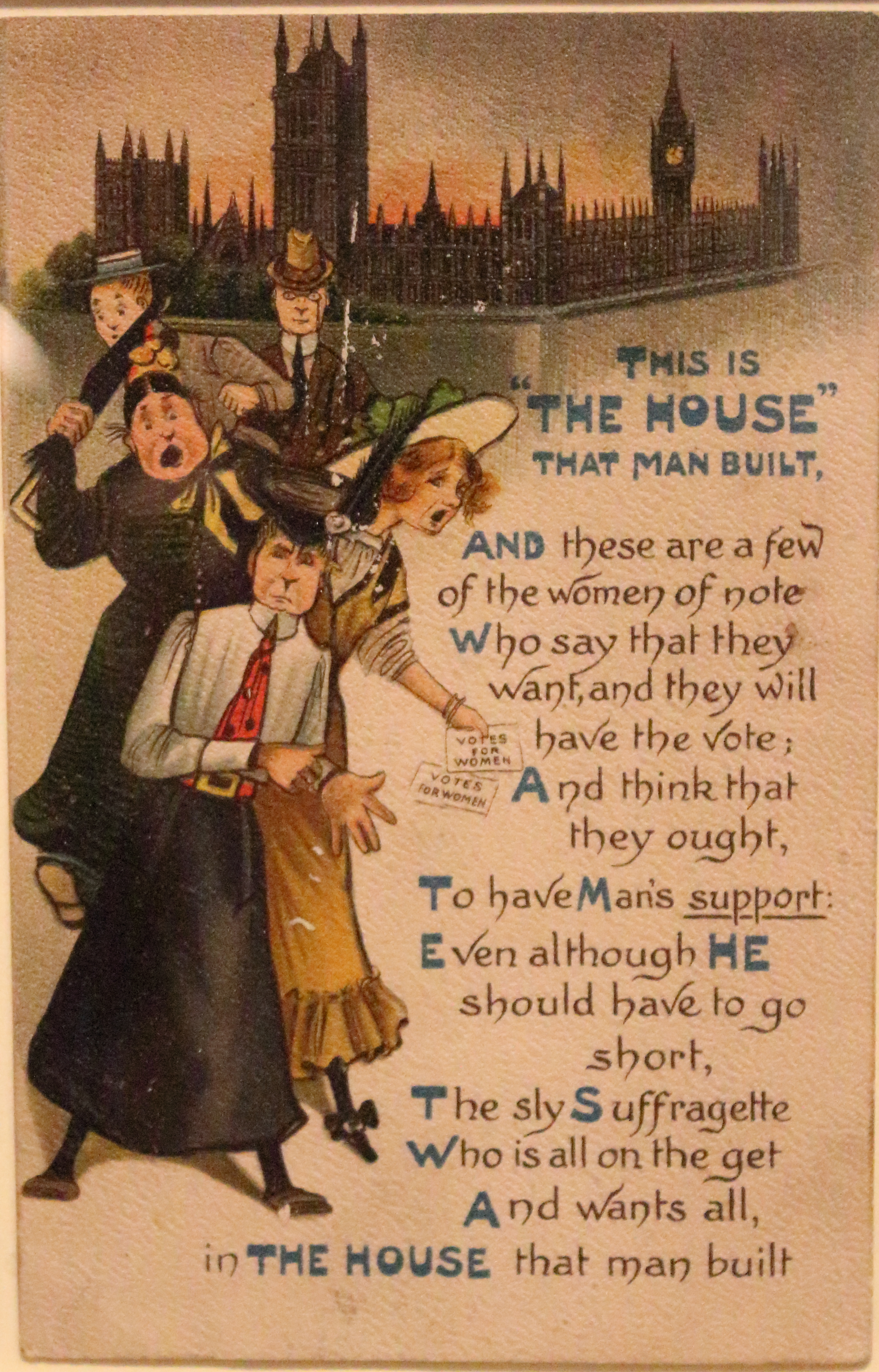
A British postcard against women's suffrage postcard from c. 1908. It shows unflattering caricatures of suffragettes in front of parliament and the caption: "This is the house that man built" with a poem. From the People's History Museum, Manchester.

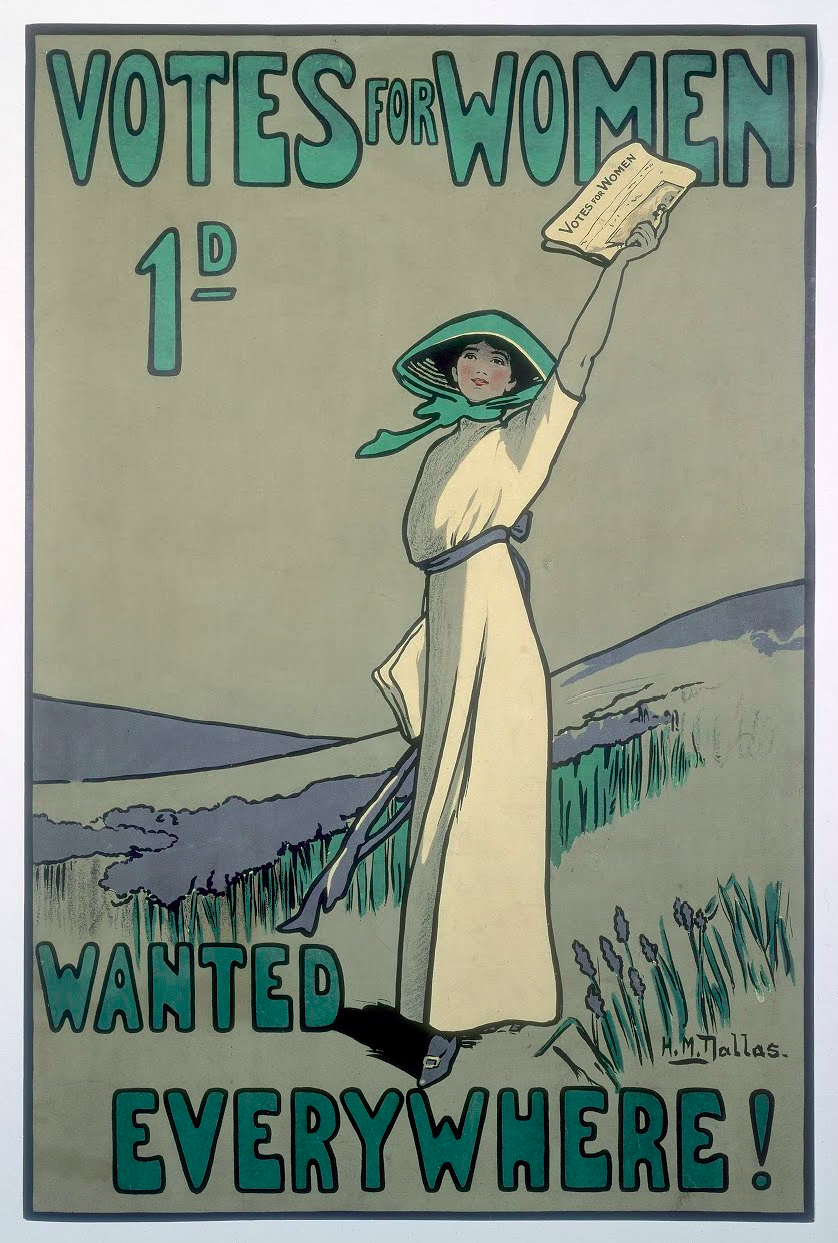
Britain's WSPU poster by Hilda Dallas, 1909

Those against the women's suffrage movement made public organizations to put down the political movement, with the main argument being that a woman's place was in the home, not polls. Political cartoons and public outrage over women's rights increased as the opposition to suffrage worked to organize legitimate groups campaigning against women's voting rights. The Massachusetts Association Opposed to the Further Extension of Suffrage to Women was one organization that came out of the 1880s to put down the voting efforts.

Much anti-suffrage propaganda poked fun at the idea of women in politics. Political cartoons displayed the most sentiment by portraying the issue of women's suffrage to be swapped with men's lives. Some mocked the popular suffrage hairstyle of full-upward combed hair. Others depicted young girls turning into suffragettes after a failure in life, such as not being married.

=== Equal suffrage ===
Equal suffrage is sometimes confused with Universal suffrage, although the meaning of the former is the removal of graded votes, wherein a voter could possess a number of votes in accordance with income, wealth or social status.

=== Passive suffrage ===
Nomination rules in elections regulate the conditions under which a candidate or political party is entitled to stand for election. The right to stand for election, right to be a candidate or passive suffrage is one part of free and fair elections. Passive suffrage is distinct from active suffrage, the right to vote. The criteria to stand as a candidate depends on the individual legal system. They may include the age of a candidate, citizenship, endorsement by a political party and profession. Laws' restrictions, such as competence or moral aptitude, can be used in a discriminatory manner. Restrictive or politically biased nomination rules can impact the civil rights of candidates, political parties, and voters and can have similar effects to political party bans or political repression.

=== Census suffrage ===
Also known as "censitary suffrage", it is the opposite of equal suffrage, meaning that the votes cast by those eligible to vote are not equal, but weighed differently according to the person's income or rank in society (e.g., people who do not own property or whose income is lower than a given amount are barred from voting; or people with higher education have more votes than those with lower education; stockholders who have more shares in a given company have more votes than those with fewer shares). In many countries, census suffrage restricted who could vote and be elected: in the United States, until the Jacksonian reforms of the 1830s, only men who owned land of a specified acreage or monetary value could vote or participate in elections. Similarly, in Brazil, the Constitution of 1824 established that, in order to vote, citizens would need to have an annual income of 200,000 milréis and, to be voted, their minimum annual income would need to be 400,000 milréis.

=== Compulsory suffrage ===
Where compulsory suffrage exists, those who are eligible to vote are required by law to do so. Thirty-two countries currently practise this form of suffrage.

=== Business vote ===
In local government in England and some of its ex-colonies, businesses formerly had, and in some places still have, a vote in the urban area in which they paid rates. This is an extension of the historical property-based franchise from natural persons to other legal persons.

In the United Kingdom, the Corporation of the City of London has retained and even expanded business vote, following the passing of the City of London (Ward Elections) Act 2002. This has given business interests within the City of London, which is a major financial centre with few residents, the opportunity to apply the accumulated wealth of the corporation to the development of an effective lobby for UK policies. This includes having the City Remembrancer, financed by the City's Cash, as a parliamentary agent. In a leaked document from 2012, an official report concerning the City's Cash revealed that the aim of major occasions such as set-piece sumptuous banquets featuring national politicians was "to increase the emphasis on complementing hospitality with business meetings consistent with the City corporation's role in supporting the City as a financial centre".

The first issue taken up by the Northern Ireland civil rights movement was the business vote, abolished in 1968 (a year before it was abolished in Great Britain outside the City of London).

In the Republic of Ireland, commercial ratepayers (Note: Strictly speaking, all ratepayers; however, domestic rates were abolished after the 1977 election.) can vote in local plebiscites, for changing the name of the locality or street, (Note: For example South Dublin County Council produced lists of addresses of residences and ratepayers within Palmerstown for the 2014 plebiscite on changing the district's spelling.) or delimiting a business improvement district. From 1930 to 1935, 5 of 35 members of Dublin City Council were "commercial members".

In cities in most Australian states, voting is optional for businesses but compulsory for individuals.

Some municipalities in Delaware allow corporations to vote on local matters.

== Basis of exclusion ==
=== Gender ===
Universal suffrage for women

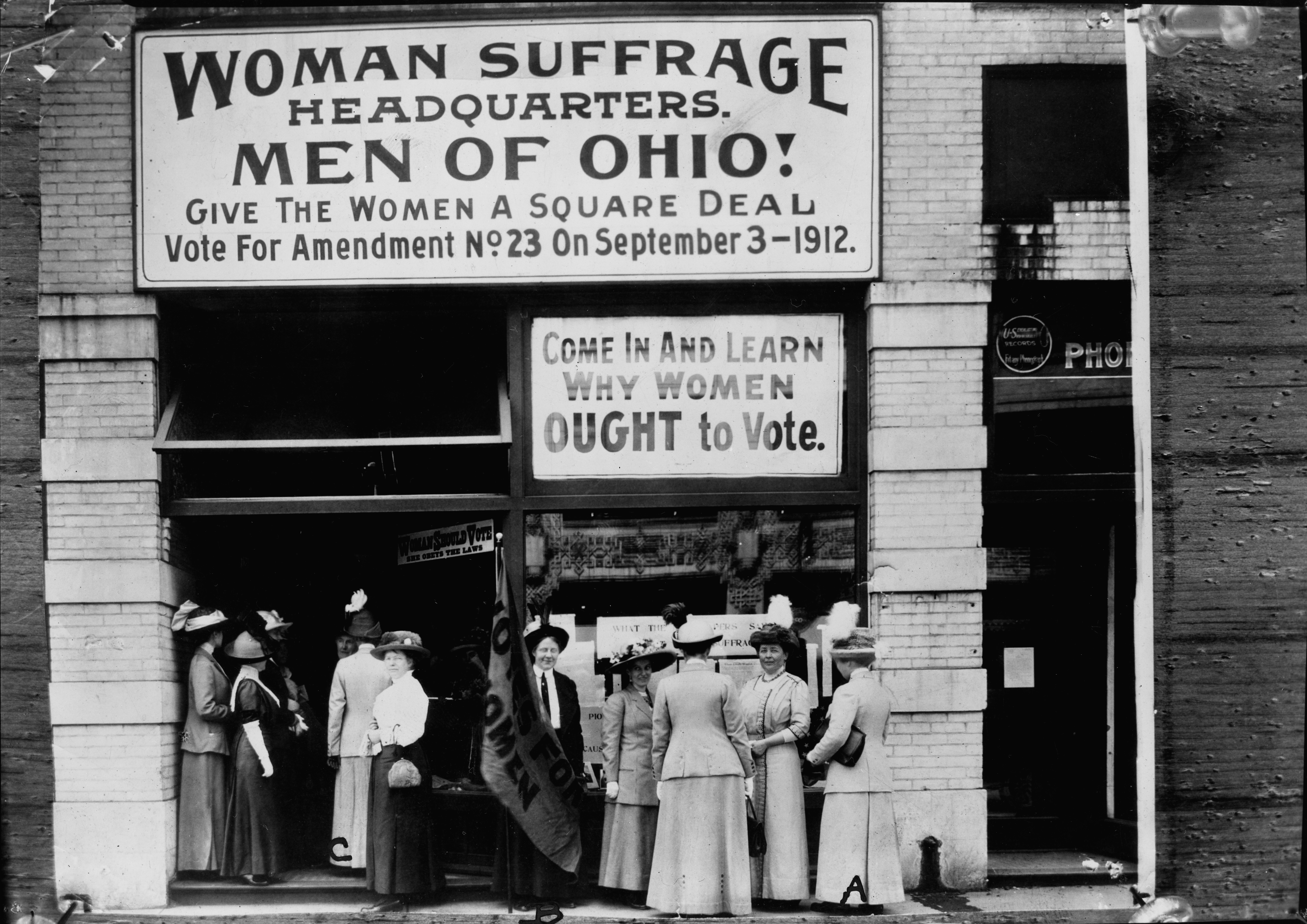
Women's Suffrage Headquarters on Euclid Avenue in Cleveland, Ohio, in 1912

In ancient Athens, often cited as the birthplace of democracy, only adult, male citizens who owned land were permitted to vote. Through subsequent centuries, Europe was generally ruled by monarchs, though various forms of parliament arose at different times. The high rank ascribed to abbesses within the Catholic Church permitted some women the right to sit and vote at national assemblies – as with various high-ranking abbesses in Medieval Germany, who were ranked among the independent princes of the empire. Their Protestant successors enjoyed the same privilege almost into modern times.

Marie Guyart, a French nun who worked with the First Nations peoples of Canada during the seventeenth century, wrote in 1654 regarding the suffrage practices of Iroquois women, "These female chieftains are women of standing amongst the savages, and they have a deciding vote in the councils. They make decisions there like the men, and it is they who even delegated the first ambassadors to discuss peace." The Iroquois, like many First Nations peoples in North America, had a matrilineal kinship system. Property and descent were passed through the female line. Women elders voted on hereditary male chiefs and could depose them.

The emergence of many modern democracies began with male citizens obtaining the right to vote in advance of female citizens, except in the Kingdom of Hawai'i, where universal suffrage without mention of age or sex was introduced in 1840; however, a constitutional amendment in 1852 rescinded female voting and put property qualifications on male voting.

Voting rights for women were introduced into international law by the United Nations' Human Rights Commission, whose elected chair was Eleanor Roosevelt. In 1948 the United Nations adopted the Universal Declaration of Human Rights; Article 21 states: "(1) Everyone has the right to take part in the government of his country, directly or through freely chosen representatives. (3) The will of the people shall be the basis of the authority of government; this will shall be expressed in periodic and genuine elections which shall be by universal and equal suffrage and shall be held by secret vote or by equivalent free voting procedures."

The United Nations General Assembly adopted the Convention on the Political Rights of Women, which went into force in 1954, enshrining the equal rights of women to vote, hold office, and access public services as set out by national laws. One of the most recent jurisdictions to acknowledge women's full right to vote was Bhutan in 2008 (its first national elections). Most recently, in 2011 King Abdullah of Saudi Arabia let women vote in the 2015 local elections (and from then on) and be appointed to the Consultative Assembly.

=== Religion ===
In the aftermath of the Reformation it was common in European countries for people of disfavored religious denominations to be denied civil and political rights, often including the right to vote, to stand for election or to sit in parliament. In Great Britain and Ireland, Roman Catholics were denied the right to vote from 1728 to 1793, and the right to sit in parliament until 1829. The anti-Catholic policy was justified on the grounds that the loyalty of Catholics supposedly lay with the Pope rather than the national monarch.

In England and Ireland, several Acts practically disenfranchised non-Anglicans or non-Protestants by imposing an oath before admission to vote or to stand for office. The 1672 and 1678 Test Acts forbade non-Anglicans to hold public offices, and the 1727 Disenfranchising Act took away Catholics' voting rights in Ireland, which were restored only in 1788. Jews could not even be naturalized. An attempt was made to change this situation, but the Jewish Naturalization Act 1753 provoked such reactions that it was repealed the following year. Nonconformists (Methodists and Presbyterians) were only allowed to run for election to the British House of Commons starting in 1828, Catholics in 1829 (following the Roman Catholic Relief Act 1829, which extended the Roman Catholic Relief Act 1791), and Jews in 1858 (with the Emancipation of the Jews in England). Benjamin Disraeli could only begin his political career in 1837 because he had been converted to Anglicanism at the age of 12.

In several states in the U.S. after the Declaration of Independence, Jews, Quakers or Catholics were denied voting rights and/or forbidden to run for office. The Delaware Constitution of 1776 stated that:

Every person who shall be chosen a member of either house, or appointed to any office or place of trust, before taking his seat, or entering upon the execution of his office, shall (...) also make and subscribe the following declaration, to wit: I, A B. do profess faith in God the Father, and in Jesus Christ His only Son, and in the Holy Ghost, one God, blessed for evermore; and I do acknowledge the holy scriptures of the Old and New Testament to be given by divine inspiration.

This was repealed by article I, section 2 of the 1792 Constitution: "No religious test shall be required as a qualification to any office, or public trust, under this State". The 1778 Constitution of the State of South Carolina stated that "No person shall be eligible to sit in the house of representatives unless he be of the Protestant religion", the 1777 Constitution of the State of Georgia (art. VI) that "The representatives shall be chosen out of the residents in each county (...) and they shall be of the Protestent (sic) religion". In Maryland, voting rights and eligibility were extended to Jews in 1828.

In Canada, several religious groups (Mennonites, Hutterites, Doukhobors) were disenfranchised by the wartime Elections Act of 1917, mainly because they opposed military service. This disenfranchisement ended with the closure of the First World War, but was renewed for Doukhobors from 1934 (via the Dominion Elections Act) to 1955.

The first Constitution of modern Romania in 1866 provided in article 7 that only Christians could become Romanian citizens. Jews native to Romania were declared stateless persons. In 1879, under pressure from the Berlin Peace Conference, this article was amended, granting non-Christians the right to become Romanian citizens, but naturalization was granted on a case-by-case basis and was subject to Parliamentary approval. An application took over ten years to process. Only in 1923 was a new constitution adopted, whose article 133 extended Romanian citizenship to all Jewish residents and equality of rights to all Romanian citizens.

=== Wealth, tax class, social class ===
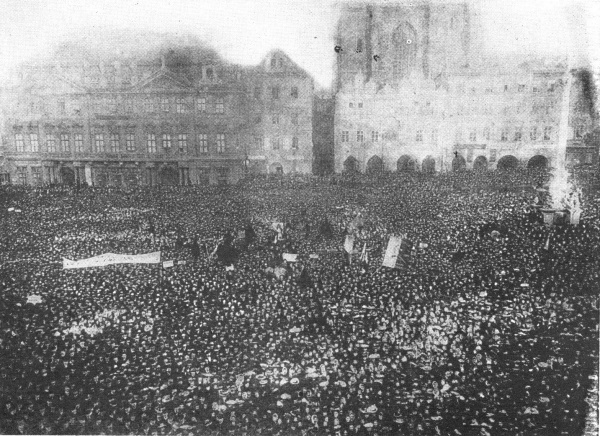
Demonstration for universal right to vote, Prague, Austria-Hungary, 1905

Until the nineteenth century, many Western proto-democracies had property qualifications in their electoral laws; e.g. only landowners could vote (because the only tax for such countries was the property tax), or the voting rights were weighted according to the amount of taxes paid (as in the Prussian three-class franchise). Most countries abolished the property qualification for national elections in the late nineteenth century, but retained it for local government elections for several decades. Today these laws have largely been abolished, although the homeless may not be able to register because they lack regular addresses.

In the United Kingdom, until the House of Lords Act 1999, peers who were members of the House of Lords were excluded from voting for the House of Commons as they were not commoners. Although there is nothing to prevent the monarch from voting, it is considered improper for the monarch to do so.

Throughout the 19th and 20th centuries, many nations made voters pay to elect officials, keeping impoverished people from being fully enfranchised. These laws were in effect in Argentina, Brazil, Canada, Chile, Costa Rica, Ecuador, Mexico, Peru, Uruguay, and Venezuela.

=== Knowledge ===
Sometimes the right to vote has been limited to people who had achieved a certain level of education or passed a certain test. In some US states, "literacy tests" were previously implemented to exclude those who were illiterate. Black voters in the South were often deemed by election officials to have failed the test even when they did not. Under the 1961 constitution of Rhodesia, voting on the "A" roll, which elected up to 50 of the 65 members of parliament, was restricted based on education requirements, which in practice led to an overwhelming white vote. Voting on the "B" roll had universal suffrage, but only appointed 15 members of parliament.

In the 20th century, many countries other than the US placed voting restrictions on illiterate people, including: Bolivia, Brazil, Canada, Chile, Ecuador, and Peru.

=== Race ===
Various countries, usually countries with a dominant race within a wider population, have historically denied the vote to people of particular races, or to all but the dominant race. This has been achieved in a number of ways:

- Official – laws and regulations passed specifically disenfranchising people of particular races (for example, the Antebellum United States, Boer republics, pre-apartheid and apartheid South Africa, or many colonial political systems, who provided suffrage only for white settlers and some privileged non-white groups). Canada and Australia denied suffrage for their indigenous populations until the 1960s.
- Indirect – nothing in law specifically prevents anyone from voting on account of their race, but other laws or regulations are used to exclude people of a particular race. In southern states of the United States of America before the passage of the Civil Rights Act of 1964 and the Voting Rights Act of 1965, poll taxes, literacy and other tests were used to disenfranchise African-Americans. Property qualifications have tended to disenfranchise a minority race, particularly if tribally owned land is not allowed to be taken into consideration. In some cases this was an unintended (but usually welcome) consequence. Many African colonies after World War II until decolonization had tough education and property qualifications which practically gave meaningful representation only for rich European minorities.
- Unofficial – nothing in law prevents anyone from voting on account of their race, but people of particular races are intimidated or otherwise prevented from exercising this right. This was a common tactic employed by white Southerners against Freedmen during the Reconstruction Era and the following period before more formal methods of disenfranchisement became entrenched. Unofficial discrimination could even manifest in ways which, while allowing the act of voting itself, effectively deprive it of any value – for example, in Israel, the country's Arab minority has maintained a party-system separate from that of the Jewish majority. In the run-up for the country's 2015 elections, the electoral threshold was raised from 2% to 3.25%, thus forcing the dominant Arab parties – Hadash, the United Arab List, Balad and Ta'al – either to run under one list or risk losing their parliamentary representation.

=== Age ===
All modern democracies require voters to meet age qualifications to vote. Worldwide voting ages are not consistent, differing between countries and even within countries, though the range usually varies between 16 and 21 years. The United Kingdom was the first major democratic nation to extend suffrage to those 18 and older in 1969. The movement to lower the voting age is one aspect of the Youth rights movement. Demeny voting has been proposed as a form of proxy voting by parents on behalf of their children who are below the age of suffrage.

Nomination rules generally include age of candidacy rules.

=== Criminality ===
Some countries restrict the voting rights of convicted criminals. Some countries, and some U.S. states, also deny the right to vote to those convicted of serious crimes even after they are released from prison. In some cases (e.g. in many U.S. states) the denial of the right to vote is automatic upon a felony conviction; in other cases (e.g. France and Germany) deprivation of the vote is meted out separately, and often limited to perpetrators of specific crimes such as those against the electoral system or corruption of public officials. In the Republic of Ireland, prisoners are allowed the right to vote, following the Hirst v UK (No2) ruling, which was granted in 2006. Canada allowed only prisoners serving a term of less than 2 years the right to vote, but this was found to be unconstitutional in 2002 by the Supreme Court of Canada in Sauvé v. Canada (Chief Electoral Officer), and all prisoners have been allowed to vote as of the 2004 Canadian federal election.

=== Residency ===
Under certain electoral systems elections are held within subnational jurisdictions, thus preventing persons from voting who would otherwise be eligible on the basis that they do not reside within such a jurisdiction, or because they live in an area that cannot participate. In the United States, license plates in Washington, D.C. read "TAXATION WITHOUT REPRESENTATION," in reference to the district not holding a seat in either the House of Representatives or Senate, however residents can vote in presidential elections based on the Twenty-third Amendment to the United States Constitution adopted in 1961. Residents of Puerto Rico enjoy neither.

Sometimes citizens become ineligible to vote because they are no longer resident in their country of citizenship. For example, Australian citizens who have been outside Australia for more than one and fewer than six years may excuse themselves from the requirement to vote in Australian elections while they remain outside Australia (voting in Australia is compulsory for resident citizens). Danish citizens that reside permanently outside Denmark lose their right to vote.

In some cases, a certain period of residence in a locality may required for the right to vote in that location. For example, in the United Kingdom up to 2001, each 15 February a new electoral register came into effect, based on registration as of the previous 10 October, with the effect of limiting voting to those resident five to seventeen months earlier depending on the timing of the election.

=== Nationality ===
In most countries, suffrage is limited to citizens and, in many cases, permanent residents of that country. However, some members of supra-national organisations such as the Commonwealth of Nations and the European Union have granted voting rights to citizens of all countries within that organisation. Until the mid-twentieth century, many Commonwealth countries gave the vote to all British citizens within the country, regardless of whether they were normally resident there. In most cases this was because there was no distinction between British and local citizenship. Several countries qualified this with restrictions preventing non-white British citizens such as Indians and British Africans from voting. Under European Union law, citizens of European Union countries can vote in each other's local and European Parliament elections on the same basis as citizens of the country in question, but usually not in national elections.

=== Naturalization ===
In some countries, naturalized citizens do not have the right to vote or to be a candidate, either permanently or for a determined period.

Article 5 of the 1831 Belgian Constitution made a difference between ordinary naturalization, and grande naturalisation. Only (former) foreigners who had been granted grande naturalisation were entitled to vote, be a candidate for parliamentary elections, or be appointed minister. However, ordinary naturalized citizens could vote for municipal elections. Ordinary naturalized citizens and citizens who had acquired Belgian nationality through marriage could vote, but not run as candidates for parliamentary elections in 1976. The concepts of ordinary and grande naturalization were suppressed from the Constitution in 1991.

In France, the 1889 Nationality Law barred those who had acquired the French nationality by naturalization or marriage from voting, and from eligibility and access to several public jobs. In 1938 the delay was reduced to five years. These instances of discrimination, as well as others against naturalized citizens, were gradually abolished in 1973 (9 January 1973 law) and 1983.

In Morocco, a former French protectorate, and in Guinea, a former French colony, naturalized citizens are prohibited from voting for five years following their naturalization.

In the Federated States of Micronesia, one must be a Micronesian citizen for at least 15 years to run for parliament.

In Nicaragua, Peru and the Philippines, only citizens by birth are eligible for being elected to the national legislature; naturalized citizens enjoy only voting rights.

In Uruguay, naturalized citizens have the right of eligibility to the parliament after five years.

In the United States, the President and Vice President must be natural-born citizens. All other governmental offices may be held by any citizen, although citizens may only run for Congress after an extended period of citizenship (seven years for the House of Representatives and nine for the Senate).

=== Function ===
In France, an 1872 law, rescinded by a 1945 decree, prohibited all army personnel from voting.

In Ireland, police (the Garda Síochána and, before 1925, the Dublin Metropolitan Police) were barred from voting in national elections, though not local elections, from 1923 to 1960.

The 1876 Constitution of Texas (article VI, section 1) stated that "The following classes of persons shall not be allowed to vote in this State, to wit: (...) Fifth—All soldiers, marines and seamen, employed in the service of the army or navy of the United States."

In many countries with a presidential system of government a person is forbidden to be a legislator and an official of the executive branch at the same time. Such provisions are found, for example, in Article I of the U.S. Constitution.

== History around the world ==
=== Australia ===
- 1855 – South Australia is the first colony to allow all male suffrage to British subjects (later extended to Aboriginal Australians over the age of 21.
- 1894 – South Australian women eligible to vote.
- 1896 – Tasmania becomes last colony to allow all male suffrage.
- 1899 – Western Australian women eligible to vote.
- 1902 – The Commonwealth Franchise Act enables women to vote federally and in the state of New South Wales. This legislation also allows women to run for government, making Australia the first democratic state in the world to allow this.
- 1921 – Edith Cowan is elected to the West Australian Legislative Assembly as member for West Perth, the first woman elected to any Australian Parliament.
- 1962 – Australian Aborigines guaranteed the right to vote in Commonwealth elections, however, in practice this right was dependent on Aboriginal voting rights having been granted by the individual's respective state.
- 1965 – Queensland is the last state to grant voting rights to Aboriginal Australians.
- 1973 - After South Australian Premier Don Dunstan introduced the Age of Majority (Reduction) Bill in October 1970, the voting age in South Australia was lowered to 18 years old in 1973. Consequently, the voting age for all federal elections was lowered from 21 to 18. The states had lowered the voting age to 18 by 1973, the first being Western Australia in 1970.

=== Canada ===
- 1871 – One of the first acts of the new Province of British Columbia strips the franchise from First Nations, and ensures Chinese and Japanese people are prevented from voting.
- 1916 – Manitoba becomes the first province in which women have the right to vote in provincial elections.
- 1917 – The federal Wartime Elections Act gives voting rights to women with relatives fighting overseas. Voting rights are stripped from all "enemy aliens" (those born in enemy countries who arrived in Canada after 1902; see also Ukrainian Canadian internment). The federal Military Voters Act gives the vote to all soldiers, even non-citizens, (with the exception of Indian and Metis veterans) and to women serving as nurses or clerks for the armed forces, but the votes are not for specific candidates but simply for or against the government.
- 1918 – Women gain full voting rights in federal elections.
- 1919 – Women gain the right to run for federal office.
- 1940 – Quebec becomes the last province where women's right to vote is recognized. (see Canadian women during the world wars for more information on Canadian suffrage)
- 1947 – Racial exclusions against Chinese and Indo-Canadians lifted.
- 1948 – Racial exclusions against Japanese Canadians lifted.
- 1955 – Religious exclusions are removed from election laws.
- 1960 – Right to vote is extended unconditionally to First Nations peoples. (Previously they could vote only by giving up their status as First Nations people.)
- 1960 – Right to vote in advance is extended to all electors willing to swear they would be absent on election day.
- 1965 – First Nations people granted the right to vote in Alberta provincial elections, starting with the 1967 Alberta general election.
- 1969 – First Nations people granted the right to vote in Quebec provincial elections, starting with the 1970 Quebec general election.
- 1970 – Voting age lowered from 21 to 18.
- 1982 – The new Canadian Charter of Rights and Freedoms guarantees all adult citizens the right to vote.
- 1988 – Supreme Court of Canada rules mentally ill patients have the right to vote.
- 1993 – Any elector can vote in advance.
- 2000 – Legislation is introduced making it easier for people of no fixed address to vote.
- 2002 – Prisoners given the right to vote in the riding (voting district) where they were convicted. All adult Canadians except the Chief and Deputy Electoral Officers can now vote in Canada.
- 2019 – The Supreme Court of Canada rules that portions of the federal Canada Elections Act which prevent citizens who have been living abroad for more than five years from voting by mail are in violation of Section 3 of the Canadian Charter of Rights and Freedoms and thus unconstitutional.

=== European Union ===
The European Union has given the right to vote in municipal elections to the citizen of another EU country by the Council Directive 94/80/EG from 19 December 1994.

=== Finland ===
- 20 July 1906 - Universal and equal suffrage and eligibility to stand for election in parliamentary elections for all over 24 years old
- 27 November 1917 - Universal and equal suffrage and eligibility to stand for election in municipal elections for all over 20 years old.
- 2000 – Section 14, al. 2 of the 2000 Constitution of Finland states that "Every Finnish citizen and every foreigner permanently resident in Finland, having attained eighteen years of age, has the right to vote in municipal elections and municipal referendums, as provided by an Act. Provisions on the right to otherwise participate in municipal government are laid down by an Act."

=== France ===
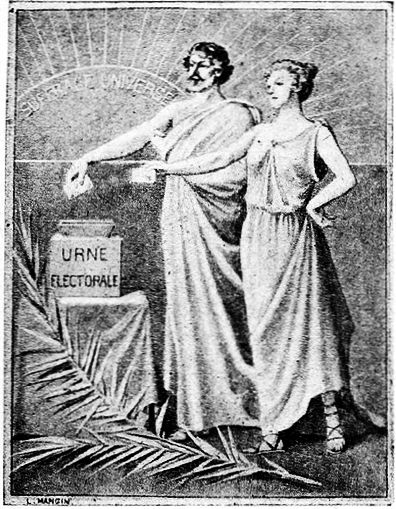
Hubertine Auclert, Le vote des femmes (1908).

- 11 August 1792: Introduction of universal suffrage (men only)
- 1795: Universal suffrage for men is replaced with indirect Census suffrage
- 13 December 1799: The French Consulate re-establishes male universal suffrage increased from 246,000 to over 9 million.
- In 1850 (31 May): The number of people eligible to vote is reduced by 30% by excluding criminals and the homeless.
- Napoleon III calls a referendum in 1851 (21 December), all men aged 21 and over are allowed to vote. Male universal suffrage is established thereafter.
- As of 21 April 1944 the franchise is extended to women over 21.
- Effective 9 July 1974 the minimum age to vote is reduced to 18 years old.

=== Germany ===
- 1848 – male citizens (citizens of state in German Confederation), adult and "independent" got voting rights, male voting population - 85%
- 1849 – male citizens above 25, not disfranchised, not declared legally incapable, did not claim pauper relief a year before the election, not a bankrupt nor in bankruptcy proceedings, not convicted of electoral fraud,
- 1866 – male citizens above 25 (citizen for at least three years), not disfranchised, not declared legally incapable, did not claim pauper relief a year before the election, enrolled on the electoral roll, inhabitant of the electoral district,
- 1869 – male citizens above 25 (citizens of state in North German Confederation), not disfranchised, not a bankrupt nor in bankruptcy proceedings, not serving soldier, did not claim pauper relief a year before the election, inhabitant of the electoral district, not in prison, not declared legally incapable,
- 1918 - full suffrage for all citizens above 20
- 1970 - full suffrage for all citizens above 18
- 2019 - suffrage for citizens with insanity defense, and persons under guardianship.

=== India ===
Since the very first Indian general election held in 1951–52, universal suffrage for all adult citizens aged 21 or older was established under Article 326 of the Constitution of India. The minimum voting age was reduced to 18 years by the 61st Amendment, effective 28 March 1989.

=== Italy ===
The Supreme Court states that "the rules derogating from the passive electoral law must be strictly interpreted".

=== Japan ===
- 1889 – Male taxpayers above 25 that paid at least 15 JPY of tax got voting rights, the voting population were 450,000 (1.1% of Japan population),
- 1900 – Male taxpayers above 25 that paid at least 10 JPY of tax got voting rights, the voting population were 980,000 (2.2% of Japan population),
- 1919 – Male taxpayers above 25 that paid at least 3 JPY of tax got voting rights, the voting population were 3,070,000 (5.5% of Japan population)
- 1925 – Male above 25 got voting rights, the voting population were 12,410,000 (20% of Japan population),
- 1945 – Japan citizens above 20 got voting rights, the voting population were 36,880,000 (48.7% of Japan population),
- 2015 – Japan citizens above 18 got voting rights, voting population - 83.3% of Japan population.

=== New Zealand ===
- 1853 – British government passes the New Zealand Constitution Act 1852, granting limited self-rule, including a bicameral parliament, to the colony. The vote was limited to male British subjects aged 21 or over who owned or rented sufficient property and were not imprisoned for a serious offence. Communally owned land was excluded from the property qualification, thus disenfranchising most Māori (indigenous) men.
- 1860 – Franchise extended to holders of miner's licenses who met all voting qualifications except that of property.
- 1867 – Māori seats established, giving Māori four reserved seats in the lower house. There was no property qualification; thus Māori men gained universal suffrage before other New Zealanders. The number of seats did not reflect the size of the Māori population, but Māori men who met the property requirement for general electorates were able to vote in them or in the Māori electorates but not both.
- 1879 – Property requirement abolished.
- 1893 – Women won equal voting rights with men, making New Zealand the first nation in the world to allow women to vote.
- 1969 – Voting age lowered to 20.
- 1974 – Voting age lowered to 18.
- 1975 – Franchise extended to permanent residents of New Zealand, regardless of whether they have citizenship.
- 1996 – Number of Māori seats increased to reflect Māori population.
- 2010 – Prisoners imprisoned for one year or more denied voting rights while serving the sentence.

=== Norway ===
- 1814 – The Norwegian constitution gave male landowners or officials above the age of 25 full voting rights.
- 1885 – Male taxpayers that paid at least 500 NOK of tax (800 NOK in towns) got voting rights.
- 1900 – Universal suffrage for men over 25.
- 1901 – Women, over 25, paying tax or having common household with a man paying tax, got the right to vote in local elections.
- 1909 – Women, over 25, paying tax or having common household with a man paying tax, got full voting rights.
- 1913 – Universal suffrage for all over 25, applying from the election in 1915.
- 1920 – Voting age lowered to 23.
- 1946 – Voting age lowered to 21.
- 1967 – Voting age lowered to 20.
- 1978 – Voting age lowered to 18.

=== Poland ===
- 1918 – In its first days of independence in 1918, after 123 years of partition, voting rights were granted to both men and women. Eight women were elected to the Sejm in 1919.
- 1952 – Voting age lowered to 18.

=== South Africa ===
- 1910 – The Union of South Africa is established by the South Africa Act 1909. The House of Assembly is elected by first-past-the-post voting in single-member constituencies. The franchise qualifications are the same as those previously existing for elections of the legislatures of the colonies that comprised the Union. In the Transvaal and the Orange Free State the franchise is limited to white men. In Natal the franchise is limited to men meeting property and literacy qualifications; it was theoretically colour-blind but in practise nearly all non-white men were excluded. The traditional "Cape Qualified Franchise" of the Cape Province is limited to men meeting property and literacy qualifications and is colour-blind; nonetheless 85% of voters are white. The rights of non-white voters in the Cape Province are protected by an entrenched clause in the South Africa Act requiring a two-thirds vote in a joint sitting of both Houses of Parliament.
- 1930 – The Women's Enfranchisement Act, 1930 extends the right to vote to all white women over the age of 21.
- 1931 – The Franchise Laws Amendment Act, 1931 removes the property and literacy qualifications for all white men over the age of 21, but they are retained for non-white voters.
- 1936 – The Representation of Natives Act, 1936 removes black voters in the Cape Province from the common voters' roll and instead allows them to elect three "Native Representative Members" to the House of Assembly. Four Senators are to be indirectly elected by chiefs and local authorities to represent black South Africans throughout the country. The act is passed with the necessary two-thirds majority in a joint sitting.
- 1951 – The Separate Representation of Voters Act, 1951 is passed by Parliament by an ordinary majority in separate sittings. It purports to remove coloured voters in the Cape Province from the common voters' roll and instead allow them to elect four "Coloured Representative Members" to the House of Assembly.
- 1952 – In Harris v Minister of the Interior the Separate Representation of Voters Act is annulled by the Appellate Division of the Supreme Court because it was not passed with the necessary two-thirds majority in a joint sitting. Parliament passes the High Court of Parliament Act, 1952, purporting to allow it to reverse this decision, but the Appellate Division annuls it as well.
- 1956 – By packing the Senate and the Appellate Division, the government passes the South Africa Act Amendment Act, 1956, reversing the annulment of the Separate Representation of Voters Act and giving it the force of law.
- 1958 – The Electoral Law Amendment Act, 1958 reduces the voting age for white voters from 21 to 18.
- 1959 – The Promotion of Bantu Self-government Act, 1959 repeals the Representation of Natives Act, removing all representation of black people in Parliament.
- 1968 – The Separate Representation of Voters Amendment Act, 1968 repeals the Separate Representation of Voters Act, removing all representation of coloured people in Parliament.
- 1969 – The first election of the Coloured Persons Representative Council (CPRC), which has limited legislative powers, is held. Every Coloured citizen over the age of 21 can vote for its members, in first-past-the-post elections in single-member constituencies.
- 1978 – The voting age for the CPRC is reduced from 21 to 18.
- 1981 – The first election of the South African Indian Council (SAIC), which has limited legislative powers, is held. Every Indian South African citizen over the age of 18 can vote for its members, in first-past-the-post elections in single-member constituencies.
- 1984 – The Constitution of 1983 establishes the Tricameral Parliament. Two new Houses of Parliament are created, the House of Representatives to represent coloured citizens and the House of Delegates to represent Indian citizens. Every coloured and Indian citizen over the age of 18 can vote in elections for the relevant house. As with the House of Assembly, the members are elected by first-past-the-post voting in single-member constituencies. The CPRC and SAIC are abolished.
- 1994 – With the end of apartheid, the Interim Constitution of 1993 abolishes the Tricameral Parliament and all racial discrimination in voting rights. A new National Assembly is created, and every South African citizen over the age of 18 has the right to vote for the assembly. The right to vote is also extended to long term residents. It is estimated the 500 000 foreign nationals voted in the 1994 national and provincial elections. Elections of the assembly are based on party-list proportional representation. The right to vote is enshrined in the Bill of Rights.
- 1999 – In August and Another v Electoral Commission and Others the Constitutional Court rules that prisoners cannot be denied the right to vote without a law that explicitly does so.
- 2003 – The Electoral Laws Amendment Act, 2003 purports to prohibit convicted prisoners from voting.
- 2004 – In Minister of Home Affairs v NICRO and Others the Constitutional Court rules that prisoners cannot be denied the right to vote, and invalidates the laws that do so.
- 2009 – In Richter v Minister for Home Affairs and Others the Constitutional Court rules that South African citizens outside the country cannot be denied the right to vote.

=== Sri Lanka ===
- 1931 - Donoughmore Constitution granted equal suffrage for women and men, with voting possible at 21 with no property restrictions.

=== Sweden ===
- 1809 – New constitution adopted and separation of powers outlined in the Instrument of Government.
- 1810 – The Riksdag Act, setting out the procedures of functioning of the Riksdag, is introduced.
- 1862 – Under the municipal laws of 1862, some women were entitled to vote in local elections.
- 1865 – Parliament of Four Estates abolished and replaced by a bicameral legislature. The members of the First Chamber were elected indirectly by the county councils and the municipal assemblies in the larger towns and cities.
- 1909 – All men who had done their military service and who paid tax were granted suffrage.
- 1918 – Universal, and equal suffrage were introduced for local elections.
- 1919 – Universal, equal, and women's suffrage granted for general elections.
- 1921 – First general election with universal, equal, and women's suffrage enacted, although some groups were still unable to vote.
- 1922 – Requirement that men had to have completed national military service to be able to vote abolished.
- 1937 – Interns in prisons and institutions granted suffrage.
- 1945 – Individuals who had gone into bankruptcy or were dependent on welfare granted suffrage.
- 1970 – Indirectly elected upper chamber dismantled.
- 1974 – Instrument of Government stopped being enforced..
- 1989 – The final limitations on suffrage abolished along with the Riksdag's decision to abolish the 'declaration of legal incompetency'.

=== Turkey ===
- 1926 – Turkish civil code (Equality in civil rights)
- 1930 – Right to vote in local elections
- 1933 – First woman muhtar (Village head) Gülkız Ürbül in Demircidere village, Aydın Province
- 1934 – Right to vote in General elections
- 1935 – First 18 Women MPs in Turkish parliament
- 1950 – First woman city mayor Müfide İlhan in Mersin

=== United Kingdom ===
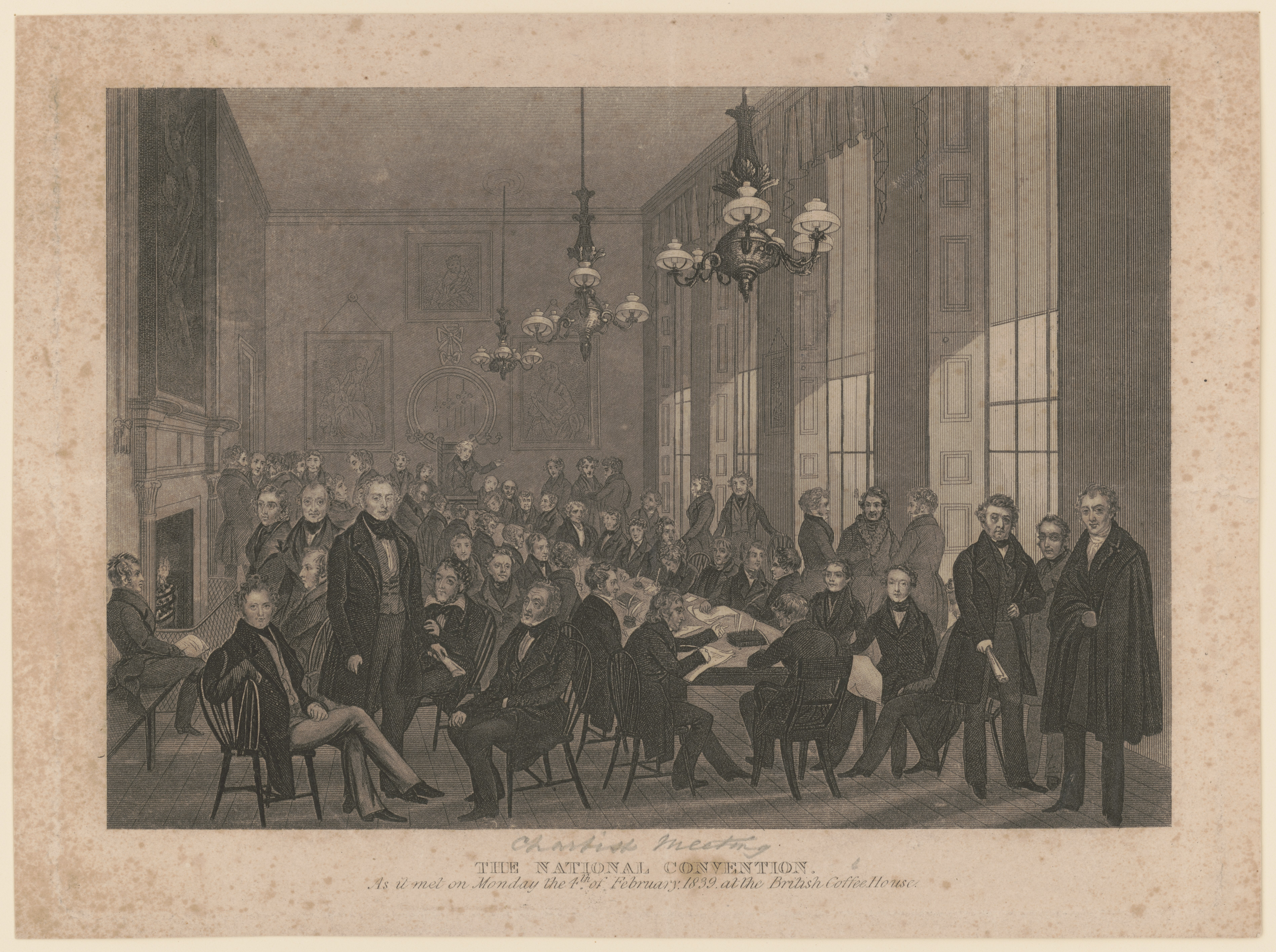
The Chartists' National Convention at the British Coffee House in February 1839

From 1265, a few percent of the adult male population in the Kingdom of England (of which Wales was a full and equal member from 1542) were able to vote in parliamentary elections that occurred at irregular intervals to the Parliament of England. The franchise for the Parliament of Scotland developed separately. King Henry VI of England established in 1432 that only owners of property worth at least forty shillings, a significant sum, were entitled to vote in an English county constituency. The franchise was restricted to males by custom rather than statute. Changes were made to the details of the system, but there was no major reform until the Reform Act 1832. (Note: Until this Act specified 'male persons', a few women had been able to vote in parliamentary elections through property ownership, although this was rare.) A series of Reform Acts and Representation of the People Acts followed. In 1918, all men over 21 and some women over 30 won the right to vote, and in 1928 all women over 21 won the right to vote resulting in universal suffrage.

- Reform Act 1832 – extended voting rights to adult males who rented propertied land of a certain value, so allowing 1 in 7 adult males in the UK voting rights.
- Chartism – The People's Charter was drawn up in 1838 by the London Working Men's Association. The following year, the first Chartist petition was presented to House of Commons. Further Chartist petitions were presented in 1842 and 1848.
- Reform Act 1867 – extended the franchise to men in urban areas who met a property qualification, so increasing male suffrage.
- Reform Act 1884 – addressed imbalances between the boroughs and the countryside; this brought the voting population to 5,500,000, although 40% of males were still disenfranchised because of the property qualification.
- Between 1885 and 1918 moves were made by the women's suffrage movement to ensure votes for women. However, the duration of the First World War stopped this reform movement.
- Representation of the People Act 1918 – the consequences of World War I persuaded the government to expand the right to vote, not only for the many men who fought in the war who were disenfranchised, but also for the women who worked in factories, agriculture and elsewhere as part of the war effort, often substituting for enlisted men and including dangerous work such as in munitions factories. All men aged 21 and over were given the right to vote. Property restrictions for voting were lifted for men. The local government franchise was extended to include all women over 21, on the same terms as men. Parliamentary Votes were given to 40% of women, with property restrictions and limited to those over 30 years old. This increased the electorate from 7.7 million to 21.4 million with women making up 8.5 million of the electorate. Seven percent of the electorate had more than one vote, either because they owned business property or because they were university graduates. The first election with this system was the 1918 general election.
- Representation of the People Act 1928 – equal suffrage for women and men, with voting possible at 21 with no property restrictions.
- Representation of the People Act 1948 – removed plural voting in parliamentary elections for university graduates and business owners.
- Representation of the People Act 1969 – extension of suffrage to those 18 and older, the first major democratic country to do so, and abolition of plural voting in local government elections.

=== United States ===
The Constitution of the United States did not originally define who was eligible to vote, allowing each state to decide this status. In the early history of the US, most states allowed only adult property owners to vote (about 6% of the population). By 1856 property ownership requirements were eliminated in all states, but suffrage was restricted to white men. However, tax-paying requirements remained in five states until 1860 and in two states until the 20th century.

Since the Civil War, five amendments to the Constitution have limited the ways in which the right to vote may be restricted in American elections, though none have added a general right to vote. (Note: The 14th Amendment (1868) altered the way each state is represented in the House of Representatives. It counted all residents for apportionment including former slaves, overriding the three-fifths compromise of the original Constitution; it also reduced a state's apportionment if it wrongfully denied the right to vote to males over age 21. However, this sanction was not enforced in practice.)

- 15th Amendment (1870): "The right of citizens of the United States to vote shall not be denied or abridged by the United States or by any State on account of race, color, or previous condition of servitude."
- 19th Amendment (1920): "The right of citizens of the United States to vote shall not be denied or abridged by the United States or by any State on account of sex."
- 23rd Amendment (1961): provides that residents of the District of Columbia can vote for the President and Vice President.
- 24th Amendment (1964): "The right of citizens of the United States to vote in any primary or other election for President or Vice President, for electors for President or Vice President, or for Senator or Representative in Congress, shall not be denied or abridged by the United States or any State by reason of failure to pay any poll tax or other tax." This did not change the rules for state elections.
- 26th Amendment (1971): "The right of citizens of the United States, who are eighteen years of age or older, to vote shall not be denied or abridged by the United States or by any State on account of age."

The use of grandfather clauses to allow European-Americans to vote while excluding African-Americans from voting was ruled unconstitutional in the 1915 decision Guinn v. United States. States continued to use literacy tests and poll taxes, which also disenfranchised poor white citizens. Racial equality in voting was substantially secured after the passage of the Voting Rights Act of 1965, a major victory in the Civil Rights Movement. State elections, it was not until the 1966 decision Harper v. Virginia Board of Elections that the U.S. Supreme Court declared state poll taxes violated the Equal Protection Clause of the Fourteenth Amendment.

== See also ==
- Constituency
- Democracy
- Direct democracy
- Disenfranchisement
- List of suffragists and suffragettes
- Voting system
- Youth suffrage
- Anti-suffragism
- Women's suffrage

== Bibliography ==
- Adams, Jad. Women and the vote: A world history (Oxford University Press, 2014); wide-ranging scholarly survey. excerpt
- Atkinson, Neill. Adventures in Democracy: A History of the Vote in New Zealand (Dunedin: University of Otago Press, 2003).
- Banyikwa, A.K., "Gender and Elections in Africa" in The Routledge Handbook of Gender and Elections (2019)
- Banyikwa, A.K., and G.L. Brown. "Women's Suffrage in Africa" in Encyclopedias of Contemporary Women's Issues (2020)
- Barnes, Joel. "The British women's suffrage movement and the ancient constitution, 1867–1909." Historical Research 91.253 (2018): 505-527.
- Crook, Malcolm. "Universal Suffrage as Counter‐Revolution? Electoral Mobilisation under the Second Republic in France, 1848–1851." Journal of Historical Sociology 28.1 (2015): 49-66.
- Daley, Caroline, and Melanie Nolan, eds. Suffrage and beyond: International feminist perspectives (NYU Press, 1994).
- Edwards, Louise P. and Mina Roces, eds. Women's Suffrage in Asia: Gender, Nationalism, and Democracy (Routledge, 2004).
- Kenney, Anne R. Women's Suffrage and Social Politics in the French Third Republic (1984).
- Mukherjee, Sumita. Indian Suffragettes: Female Identities and Transnational Networks (Oxford University Press, New Delhi, 2018)
- Mukherjee, Sumita. "Sisters in Arms" History Today (Dec 2018) 68#12 pp. 72–83. Short popular overview woman suffrage of major countries.
- Oguakwa, P.K. "Women's suffrage in Africa" in The Oxford Encyclopedia of Women in World History (2008)
- Juhani Mylly: Edustuksellisen kansanvallan läpimurto. Helsinki: Suomen eduskunta (Edita), 2006. ISBN 951-37-4541-4
- Pedroza, Luicy. "The democratic potential of enfranchising resident migrants." International Migration 53.3 (2015): 22-35. online
- Purvis, June, and June Hannam, eds. The British Women's Suffrage Campaign: National and International Perspectives (Routledge, 2021)
- Rose, Carol. "The Issue of Parliamentary Suffrage at the Frankfurt National Assembly." Central European History 5.2 (1972): 127-149. regarding universal suffrage in German history.
- Sangster, Joan. One Hundred Years of Struggle: The History of Women and the Vote in Canada (2018)
- Seghezza, Elena, and Pierluigi Morelli. "Suffrage extension, social identity, and redistribution: the case of the Second Reform Act." European Review of Economic History 23.1 (2019): 30-49. on 1867 law in Britain
- Senigaglia, Cristiana. "The debate on democratization and parliament in Germany from 1871 to 1918." Parliaments, Estates and Representation 40.3 (2020): 290-307.
- Smith, Paul. "Political parties, parliament and women's suffrage in France, 1919–1939." French History 11.3 (1997): 338-358.
- Teele, Dawn Langan. Forging the Franchise (Princeton University Press, 2018); why US and Britain came early.
- Towns, Ann. "Global Patterns and Debates in the Granting of Women's Suffrage." in The Palgrave Handbook of Women's Political Rights (Palgrave Macmillan, London, 2019) pp. 3–19.
- Willis, Justin, Gabrielle Lynch, and Nic Cheeseman. "Voting, Nationhood, and Citizenship in late-colonial Africa." Historical Journal 61.4 (2018): 1113–1135. online

=== United States ===
- Englert, Gianna. "'Not more democratic, but more moral': Tocqueville on the suffrage in America and France." The Tocqueville Review 42.2 (2021): 105-120.
- Keyssar, Alexander. The Right to Vote: The Contested History of Democracy in the United States (New York: Basic Books, 2000). ISBN 0-465-02968-X.
- Lichtman, Allan J. The Embattled Vote in America: From the Founding to the Present (Harvard UP. 2018)
- U.S. Commission on Civil Rights: Reports on Voting (2005) ISBN 978-0-8377-3103-2.
