= Vasıf Çınar =

Turkish politician

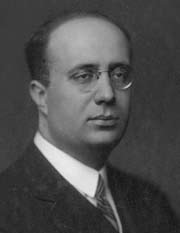
- Vasıf Çınar in the 1920s

Minister of National Education
- In office 6 March 1924 – 22 November 1924
- Prime Minister: İsmet İnönü
- Preceded by: Sefa Özler
- Succeeded by: Şükrü Saracoğlu

Minister of National Education
- In office 2 March 1929 – 13 April 1929
- Prime Minister: İsmet İnönü
- Preceded by: Mustafa Necati
- Succeeded by: Hüsnü Taray

Personal details
- Born: 1895 Crete, Ottoman Empire
- Died: June 2, 1935 (aged 39–40) Moscow, Soviet Union
- Party: Republican People's Party
- Education: Law
- Alma mater: Law School, Istanbul University
- Occupation: Politician, diplomat, hournalist, educator

Hüseyin Vasıf Çınar (1895–1935) was a Turkish educator, politician, journalist and diplomat.

== Early years ==
He was born on Crete. He was of Kurdish descend, and was the son of Abdullah Hulusi Bey, a son of Emir Bedirkhan, Emir of the Bohtan Emirate. In 1892 the Bedirkhan family were sent to exile in Crete by Abdulhamid II for their alleged influence in the murder of Ridvan Pasha. Most were later allowed to return to Istanbul, other members of the family settled to Europe, Syria and Egypt where they married within the elite and the Royal circles. After highschool he studied law. Between 1915 and 1918 he served as a teacher with his close friend Mustafa Necati. After the occupation of İzmir on 15 May 1919 by the Greek army however, they went to Balıkesir to publish a newspaper named İzmir'e Doğru ("Towards İzmir") to support the nationalistic resistance . They also founded a society named Red'i ilhak ("Opposing occupation").

== Politics ==
During the Republican era, he represented Saruhan (present Manisa) in the 3rd Parliament of Turkey. His rhetoric was influential in the abolition of the caliphate. He also served in Independence tribunals. In the 2nd and 5th government of Turkey, he was the Minister of National Education. During his brief service in the 5th government, he was instrumental to carry the alphabet reform and nation's schools, which were started by his friend Nustafa Necati.

== Diplomacy ==
He was one of the early diplomats of the Turkish Republic. He represented Turkey in Prague (1925–1927), Budapest (1928), Rome (1932–1934) and Moscow (1934–1935). He died on 2 June 1935, during his service in Moscow.

== Legacy ==
A school in Istanbul is named after Vasıf Çınar. Çınar's essays published in the newspaper İzmir'e Doğru of 1919 were compiled by Tülay Alim Baran and published by the municipality of Balıkesir .
