= Turkish civil code (1926) =

Turkish civil code (Turkish: Türk Medeni Kanunu) is one of the earliest laws in the history of Turkey within the scope of the Turkish Revolution.

== Background ==
During the Ottoman Empire, the legal system of Turkey was based on Sharia as in other Muslim countries. A committee headed by Ahmet Cevdet Pasha in 1877 compiled the rules of Sharia. Although this was an improvement, it still lacked modern concepts. Besides two different legal systems were adopted; one for the Muslim and the other for the non Muslim subjects of the empire. After the proclamation of Turkish Republic on 29 October 1923, Turkey began to adopt modern laws.

== Preparation ==
The Turkish parliament formed a committee to compare the civil codes of European countries. Austrian, German, French, and Swiss civil codes were examined. Finally on 25 December 1925 the commission decided on the Swiss civil code as a model for the Turkish civil code. The Turkish Civil Code was enacted on 17 February 1926. The preamble to the Code was written by Mahmut Esat Bozkurt, the minister of justice in the 4th government of Turkey.

== Women's rights ==
Although the code addressed many areas of modern life, the most important articles dealt with women's rights. For the first time, women and men were acknowledged to be equal. Under the prior legal system, women's share in inheritance and the weight of women's testimony in court were half that of men. Under the code, men and women were made equal with regard to inheritance and testimony.

Furthermore, civil marriage was made compulsory, and polygamy was banned. Women were given the right to choose any profession. Universal women's suffrage, however, was not established until 5 December 1934.

== See also ==
- Gülkız Ürbül
- Hatı Çırpan
- Müfide İlhan
