= Internal colonialism =

Systematic exploitation of minority groups within a state

Internal colonialism is the uneven effects of economic development on a regional basis, otherwise known as "uneven development", as a result of the exploitation of minority groups within a wider society which leads to political and economic inequalities between regions within a state. This is held to be similar to the relationship between a metropole and a colony, in colonialism proper. The phenomenon leads to the distinct separation of the dominant core from the periphery in an empire.

Robert Blauner is regarded as the developer of the theory of internal colonialism. The term was coined to highlight the "blurred" lines between geographically close locations that are clearly different in terms of culture. Some other factors that separate the core from the periphery are language, religion, physical appearance, types and levels of technology, and sexual behavior. The cultural and integrative nature of internal colonialism is understood as a project of modernity and it has been explored by Robert Peckham in relation to the formation of a national modern Greek culture during the nineteenth century, when Greece gained its independence from the Ottoman Empire.

The main difference between neocolonialism and internal colonialism is the source of the exploitation. In the former, the control comes from outside the nation-state, while in the latter it comes from within.

== Origin of the concept ==
The first known use of the concept of internal colonialism was by Marquard (1957) regarding South Africa. However, the concept became popularized following the publication of an article on Mexico by Gonzalez Casanova (1965). Gonzalez Casanova was both critiqued by, and influenced Andre Gunder Frank, who further theorised internal colonialism as a form of "uneven development". Sergio Salvi [it], a poet, essayist, and historian of minority languages, used the term "internal colonies" in the cultural sense in Le nazioni proibite: Guida a dieci colonie interne dell'Europa occidentale ("The forbidden nations: Guide to ten internal colonies of western Europe") (1973), among which he included Catalonia, Scotland, Brittany and Occitania. Other pivotal works on the subject were published during the mid-1970s by Harold Wolpe and Michael Hechter.

== Examples ==
A common topic amongst postcolonial writers was their description of feelings, such as schizophrenia, being torn between local tradition and global modernity.

=== Afghanistan ===
Afghanistan is an example of internal colonialism affecting state-building, as Nazif Shahrani argues "the incessantly centralizing state policies and practices of internal colonialism, generally aided and abetted by old colonialist powers... produced a cumulatively negative impact on state-building efforts in Afghanistan." The international security scholar, Dipali Mukhopadhyay, considers the presence of warlordism in the Afghan periphery to be a concern for the development of the political economy, with the 2007 World Bank Report highlighting weak institutional links between provincial offices and relationships with the central government poorly defined.

=== Algeria ===
One of the exceptions of internal colonialism as the subsistence of 'blurred lines' between the core and periphery is French Algeria. There were clearly distinct features separating the core from the periphery. "The core was Christian, French-speaking, light-skinned, and comparatively prosperous". The other side was Muslim, Arabic- or Berber-speaking, and significantly poorer. The grey area of French Algeria was the large Jewish population, which did not belong in either the core or periphery in terms of common cultural factors.

=== Austria-Hungary ===
Austro-Hungarian Empire exhibited characteristics of internal colonialism, where certain regions and ethnic groups within the empire (like Hungary and Transylvania) were systematically disadvantaged compared to the dominant German-speaking core.

=== Baltic states ===
In the mid of twenty century, the Soviet-annexed countries of Estonia, Latvia, and Lithuania had a colonial relationship with the rest of the Soviet Union, similar to the one that existed between the old tsarist empire and its far-flung territories. Although the countries were gradually being Sovietized after their period of initial resistance, the newly established economic, cultural, and social circumstances were colonial, as the reconstruction of the economy in the region served the interests of the colonizers, identities became shaped in relation to the increasing Soviet presence, the experience of oppression became an increasingly important part of the local culture, and local historical and cultural heritage was revalued and rewritten. When the Soviet Union dissolved and the Baltic states became independent once again, they had to deal with problems similar to other postcolonial nations: polluted landscapes, damaged economies, ethnic tensions, and determining the national narrative of the past, present and future.

=== Canada ===
Since the early 1970s, scholars have used the concepts of internal colonialism and "internal colonies" to describe the Canadian North, primarily the extractive relationship between the territories and the federal government. Conway (2014) documents the internal colonialism of Western Canadian Provinces by Central Canada, citing issues with the National Energy Program, the Crow Rate, and Equalization payments in Canada amongst others.

=== China ===
Since the beginning of the Chinese administration in Tibet, China's government has been accused of committing both genocide and cultural genocide against the Tibetan people by the TGIE, various Tibetan emigres, and their supporters. Tibet, having been a self-governed province of China, has been completely annexed by China since 1951 with the Tibetan Government in Exile (TGIE) claiming that 1.2 million Tibetans died from the actions of the Chinese administration from 1951 to 1984. Supporters of the claim that the actions of the Chinese administration in Tibet constitutes genocide and colonialism challenge the Chinese government's claim that Tibet has been considered an integral part of China for centuries, arguing that historical correspondences make it clear that Tibet was not considered a part of China until recent times.

=== Italy ===
During the Fascist era, alongside the overseas colonies in East Africa, there was also an internal colonial policy, which was implemented primarily in the largely German-speaking South Tyrol, with the aim of accelerating the process of Italianisation in a region that had only become part of Italy in 1919. This policy involved the fascistisation of the administration, the increased settlement of Italian-speaking populations, land acquisition and ecological imperialism, which began to systematically exploit the area’s natural resources, particularly hydropower.

=== Philippines ===
In the Philippines, non-Manilans have often expressed that the affairs of the country—whether political, economic but most importantly cultural including linguistic—are imposed from the Manilan core on the peripheral rest of the country due to Tagalist nationalism. This has been articulated in a Cebuano saying, which goes, "Walay dahong mahulog sa atong nasod nga dili mananghid sa Malakanyang," translated as "Not a leaf may fall in our country without Malacañang's permission." (Note: An example of this proverb's use can be found the following quote from David C. Martínez: [W]e've left sacred and untouched, spotless and unsullied, the same centralist authority where near-absolute political power continues to reside: Imperial Manila. My father spoke the truth when he used to lament in Cebuano, "Wa y dahong mahulog sa atong nasud nga di mananghid sa Malacañang" (Not a leaf can fall in our country without Malacañang's permission)) There are also documented cases of certain personalities calling for the political isolation, overthrow and outright assassination of those who are opposed to the current core–periphery relationship. (Note: For instance, in Filipino ng mga Filipino, Almario called for the ousting of troublemaking politicians in the province of Cebu.)

Mindanao, with its favorable location below the typhoon belt and its rich mineral resources, naturally attracted foreign capital to the area. This prompted then President Ramon Magsaysay since the mid-1950s and subsequently President Ferdinand Marcos (1966–1986) to systematically resettle people into Mindanao. This led to the proportion of indigenous peoples in Mindanao to shrink from majority in 1913 to minority by 1976. The best lands in Mindanao were given to settlers and owners of corporate agriculture, while most development investments and government services were offered to the Christian population. This caused the Muslim population to be backward and rank among the poorest in their own country. The resettlement programme was not entirely peaceful as some settlers managed to obtain land from the native Muslims through harassment and other violent efforts which drove the Muslims out of their own lands.

The Muslims were alienated by the Philippines government and felt threatened by Christian economic and political domination in their own homeland. This resorted in some Muslim groups to turn to extortion and violence to protect their own land and refrain from being displaced. Such efforts of “integration” had led to the crystallisation of the Moro identity as the Muslims’ identity with the Filipino nation declined rapidly due to the threat in economic and social Muslim life.

As an effect of the resettlement, traditional Muslim leaders (also referred as datu) were also voted out during the polls as Christians, who made up a significant majority of the voters, preferred the Christian politicians over them. These local datus suffered a loss in prestige as they could no longer control the Muslim lands. These politicians lost much of the capabilities they had possessed initially to manage the Muslim populace.

=== Sri Lanka ===
Several scholars have applied the concept of internal colonialism to Sri Lanka.

Bryan Pfaffenberger argued in 1984 that colonial forms of oppression could persist after formal decolonization when post-colonial governments failed to respect the rights of indigenous minorities. He described Sri Lanka as an example and pointed to the limited public investment reaching Tamil areas. In 1996, Jeff Sluka described Sri Lanka as an example of internal colonialism, arguing that many Tamils felt subjected to colonial-style treatment by the Sinhalese-dominated state.

=== Thailand ===
During the early 20th century, the Siamese Empire which was a mandala empire consisted of several vassal states such as principalities of the former Lan Na Kingdom to the north and the Sultanate of Patani to the south under the tightening suzerainty of the Siamese Kingdom was transformed in to a unitary modern nation-state by abolishing the vassal status of the vassal states, incorporating them into an integral part of Siam, and assimilating the cultures of the vassals via the process of Thaification. For internal colonization in the kingdom of Thailand, refer to articles on Monthon and on Thaification. There is a posited link between internal colonialism and ethnic rebellion in Thailand.

=== Turkey ===
The internal colonization of the Eastern Provinces was outlined during the Government of Mustafa Kemal Atatürk. Cemil Uyabdin saw the Report for Reform in the East as a guideline to the internal colonization of the Eastern Provinces through which the Kurdish population should be Turkified. In a report delivered to the Republican People's Party (CHP) following the defeat of the Dersim rebellion, the Resettlement Law issued in 1934 was also described as an effective vehicle for the internal colonization of the eastern provinces.

=== United States ===
The relationship between Appalachia and the rest of the United States, historically characterized by mineral extraction, the destruction of the natural environment, and the exploitation of the miner class - at one time paid only in company scrip and policed by private armies, has led to deep-rooted poverty and health issues in the region. In 1963, historian Harry M. Caudill characterized Central Appalachia as "a colonial appendage of the industrial East and Middle West."

== See also ==
- Internally displaced person
- Internal migration
- Internal passport
- Suburban colonization
- Environmental racism in Europe
- Gentrification
- Weaponized migration

== Bibliography ==
- Brown, David (1994). The state and ethnic politics in Southeast Asia. London: Routledge. ISBN 978-0-415-12792-9.
- Conway, John F. (2014). The Rise of the New West: The History of a Region in Confederation. Toronto: Lorimer. ISBN 9781459406247. OCLC 866048035.
- Fuller, Mia (2019), "Laying Claim: Italy's Internal and External Colonies", in Bagnato, Andrea; Ferrari, Marco; Pasqual, Elisa (eds.), A Moving Border: Alpine Cartographies of Climate Change, New York: Columbia Books on Architecture and the City, pp. 99–111, ISBN 978-1-941332450
- Gonzalez Casanova, Pablo (1965), "Internal Colonialism and National Development", Studies in Comparative International Development, 1 (4): 27–37, doi:10.1007/bf02800542, S2CID 153821137
- Hechter, Michael (1975), Internal Colonialism: The Celtic Fringe in British National Development, Berkeley: University of California Press
- Howe, S. (2002), Empire: A Very Short Introduction, New York: Oxford University Press
- Marquard, Leo (1957), South Africa's Colonial Policy, Johannesburg: Institute of Race Relations
- Martinez, David (2004). A Country of Our Own: Partitioning the Philippines. Los Angeles: Bisaya Books. ISBN 978-0-9760613-0-4.
- Mukhopadhyay, Dipali (2014). Warlords, Strongman Governors, and the State in Afghanistan. Cambridge University Press. ISBN 9781107729193.
- Peckham, Robert (2004), "Internal Colonialism: Nation and Region in Nineteenth-Century Greece", in Todorova, Maria Todorova (ed.), Balkan Identities: Nation and Memory, New York: New York University Press, pp. 41–59
- Pinderhughes, Charles (2011). "Toward a New Theory of Internal Colonialism". Socialism and Democracy. 25: 235–256. doi:10.1080/08854300.2011.559702. S2CID 143778302.
- Shahrani, M Nazif (2002), "War, Factionalism, and the State in Afghanistan", American Anthropologist, 104 (3): 715–722, doi:10.1525/aa.2002.104.3.715
