= 3rd government of Turkey =

Government of the Republic of Turkey (1924-1925)

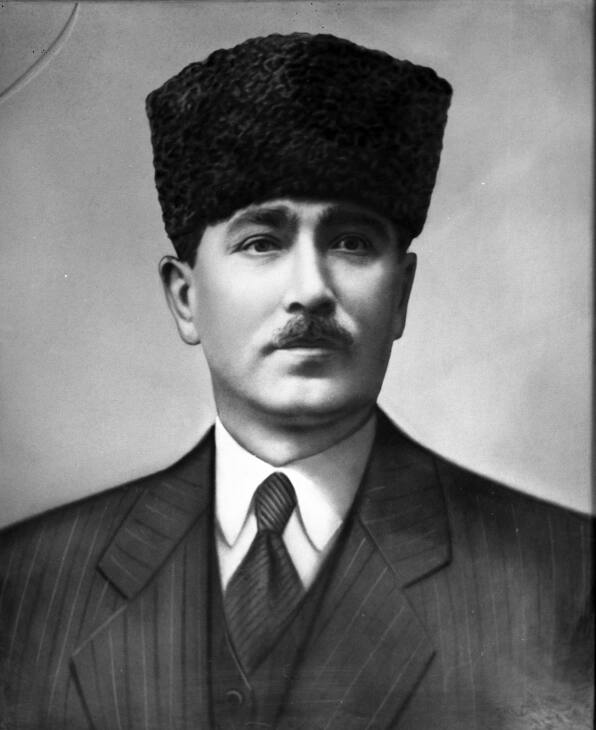
Fethi Okyar

The 3rd government of Turkey (22 November 1924 – 3 March 1925) was the third government in the history of the Turkish Republic. It is also known as Fethi Okyar's government.

== Background ==
The prime minister was Fethi Okyar of the Republican People's Party (CHP). Previously, he was a minister in an Ottoman Empire government and prime minister in pre-Republican Turkey (1923). He was a moderate politician, and his government succeeded İsmet İnönü's two governments after the Progressive Republican Party began a strong opposition campaign in the parliament.(see Progressive Republican Party (Turkey))

== The government ==
In the list below, the cabinet members who served only a part of the cabinet's lifespan are shown in the column "Notes".

Title	Name	Notes
Prime Minister and Ministry of National Defense	Fethi Okyar	
Ministry of Justice	Mahmut Esat Bozkurt	
Ministry of the Interior and Ministry of Exchange Construction and Settlement	Recep Peker; Cemil Uybadın	22 November 1924 – 5 January 1925; 5 January 1925 – 3 March 1925
Ministry of Foreign Affairs	Şükrü Kaya	
Ministry of Finance	Abdülhalik Renda	
Ministry of National Education	Şükrü Saracoğlu	
Ministry of Public Works	Aziz Feyzi Pirinççizade	
Ministry of Health	Mazhar Germen	
Ministry of Commerce	Ali Cenani	
Ministry of Agriculture and Village Affairs	Hasan Fehmi Ataç	
Ministry of Navy	İhsan Eryavuz	

In 1924–1925, surnames were not in use in Turkey, which would remain true until the Surname Law. The surnames given in the list are the surnames the members of the cabinet assumed later.

== Aftermath ==
Fethi Okyar's cabinet fell because it was ineffective in quashing the Sheikh Said rebellion; the next government was again founded by İsmet İnönü.

Preceded by 2nd government of Turkey (İsmet İnönü)	3rd Government of Turkey; 22 November 1924 – 3 March 1925	Succeeded by 4th government of Turkey (İsmet İnönü)
