= 4th government of Turkey =

Government of the Republic of Turkey (1925-1927)

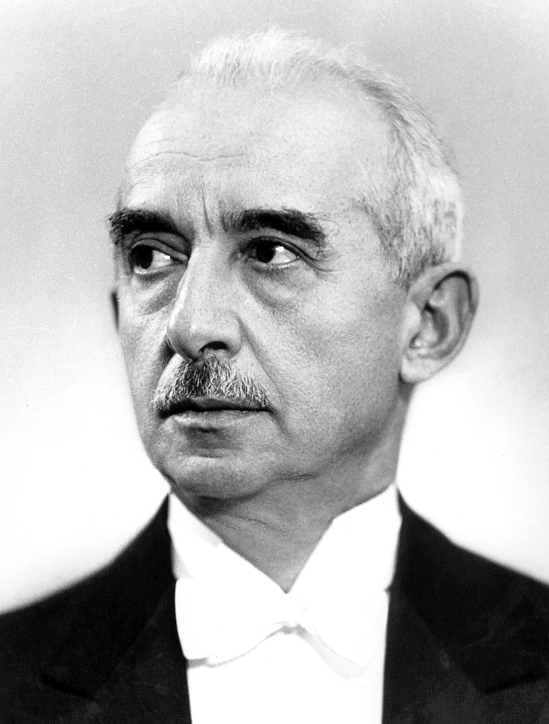
İsmet İnönü

The 4th government of Turkey (3 March 1925 – 1 November 1927) was a government in the history of Turkey. It is also called the third İnönü government.

== Background ==
The government was formed after the previous government led by Fethi Okyar fell following the Sheikh Said rebellion. The new prime minister was İsmet İnönü of the Republican People's Party (CHP), who was also the prime minister of the first two governments of Turkey

== The government ==
In the list below, the cabinet members who served only a part of the cabinet's lifespan are shown in the column "Notes".

Title	Name	Notes
Prime Minister	İsmet İnönü	
Ministry of Justice	Mahmut Esat Bozkurt	
Ministry of National Defense	Recep Peker	
Ministry of the Interior	Cemil Uybadın	
Ministry of Foreign Affairs	Tevfik Rüştü Aras	
Ministry of Finance	Hasan Saka; Abdülhalik Renda	3 March 1925 – 13 July 1926; 13 July 1926 – 1 November 1927
Ministry of National Education	Hamdullah Suphi Tanrıöver; Mustafa Necati Uğural	3 March 1925 – 21 December 1925; 21 December 1925 – 1 November 1927
Ministry of Public Works	Süleyman Sırrı Ara; Behiç Erkin	3 March 1925 – 16 December 1925; 14 January 1926 – 1 November 1927
Ministry of Health and Social Security	Refik Saydam	
Ministry of Commerce	Ali Cenani; Rahmi Köken	3 March 1925 – 17 May 1926; 17 May 1926 – 1 November 1927
Ministry of Agriculture	Mehmet Sabri Toprak	
Ministry of Navy	İhsan Eryavuz	

In 1925–1927, surnames were not in use in Turkey, which would remain true until the Surname Law. The surnames given in the list are the surnames the members of the cabinet assumed later.

== Aftermath ==
On 1 November 1927, the president Mustafa Kemal Atatürk was elected for the third time, and according to custom, İsmet İnönü resigned and re-formed his government.

Preceded by 3rd government of Turkey (Fethi Okyar)	4th Government of Turkey; 3 March 1925 – 1 November 1927	Succeeded by 5th government of Turkey (İsmet İnönü)
