= 5th cabinet of the Executive Ministers of Turkey =

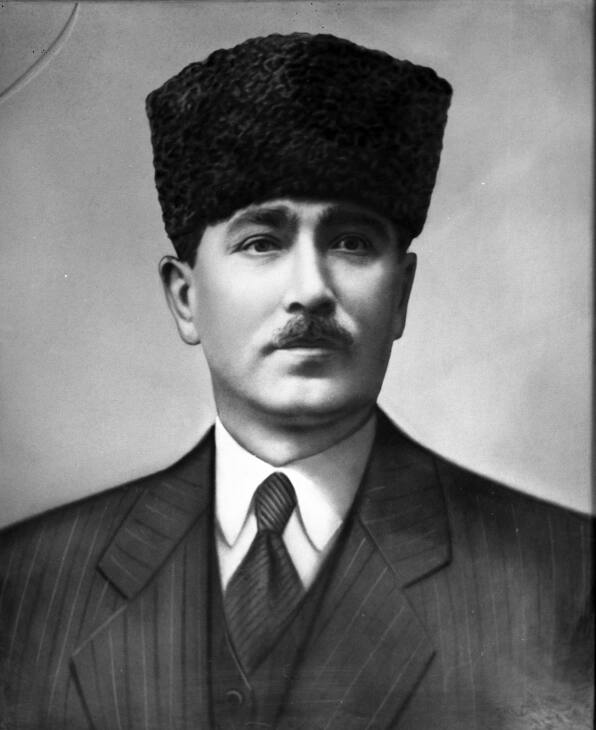
Fethi Okyar

The 5th cabinet of executive ministers of Turkey (14 August 1923- 27 October 1923 ) was the fifth government formed by the nationalists after the Turkish War of Independence. The Republic was not yet proclaimed and the government was called İcra vekilleri heyeti ("cabinet of executive ministers")

== Background ==
The chairman of the cabinet (equivalent to prime minister) was Fethi Bey (later named Okyar). Both Fethi Bey and the other members of the cabinet were elected by the parliament one by one. This cabinet was basically the same as the previous cabinet (4th cabinet of the Executive Ministers in Turkey) except for the fact that the previous chairman Rauf (Orbay) who was displeased with the treaty of Lausanne had resigned and also a new ministry, that of Settlement and Population Exchange which was authorized for the exchange of Turkish and Greek population was included in the cabinet list.

== The government ==
In the list below, the name in parathesis is the surname the cabinet members assumed later.(see Surname Law of 1934)

Title	Name	Dates
Chairman; Minister of Interior	Fethi (Okyar)	
Ministry of Sharia and the Foundations	Mustafa Kazım (Onar); Mustafa Fevzi (Sarhan)	14 August 1923 - 24 September 1923; 24 September 1923 - 27 October 1923
Minister of Justice	Mehmet Seyit	
Minister of General Staff	Fevzi (Çakmak)	
Minister of National Defense	Kazım (Özalp)	
Minister of Foreign Affairs	İsmet (İnönü)	
Minister of Economy	Mahmut Esat (Bozkurt); Hasan (Saka)	14 August 1923 - 24 September 1923; 24 September 1923 - 27 October 1923
Minister of Education	İsmail Sefa (Özler)	
Minister of Finance	Hasan Fehmi (Ataç)	
Minister of Public Works	Fevzi (Pirinççioğlu)	
Minister of Health and Social Solidarity	Rıza Nur	
Minister of Settlement and Population Exchange	Mustafa Necati	

This cabinet was the last cabinet of the pre-Republic Turkey. Turkish Republic was proclaimed on 29 October 1923.

Preceded by 4th cabinet of the Executive Ministers of Turkey (Rauf Bey)	5th cabinet of the Executive Ministers of Turkey (Fethi Bey); 14 August 1923 -27 September 1923	Succeeded by 1st government of Turkey (İsmet Pasha)
