= 3rd Parliament of Turkey =

Grand National Assembly from 1927 to 1931

The 3rd Grand National Assembly of Turkey existed from 2 September 1927 to 4 May 1931.

There were 367 MPs in the parliament all of which were the members of the Republican People's Party (CHP). But later 15 of them issued from CHP to serve in the Liberal Republican Party (SCF)

== Main parliamentary milestones ==
Some of the important events in the history of the parliament are the following:

- 1 November - Mustafa Kemal (Atatürk) was elected as the president of Turkey for the second time.
- 3 November - İsmet İnönü of CHP formed the 5th government of Turkey .
- 10 April 1928 - Constitutional Amendment to secularize the state.
- 1 November 1928 – Law 1348 : Latin alphabet instead of the traditional Arabic alphabet.
- 1 January 1929 – Nation's schools Project, a temporary project to train adults in Latin Alphahabet. (See Mustafa Necati)
- 3 April 1930 – Law 1580 : Turkish women achieved voting rights in local elections. (see Turkish women in politics)
- 12 August 1930 - Liberal Republican Party (SCF) was founded by the ex prime minister (1924) Fethi Okyar. (Atatürk's sister was one of the members)
- 27 September 1930 – İsmet İnönü formed the 6th government of Turkey
- 17 November – SCF dissolved itself
- 26 March 1931 – Law 1782 : International measurements were adopted instead of the traditional ones.
- 25 April 1931 - General elections (first stage)
- 4 May 1931 – Elections (second stage)

| Preceded by 2nd Parliament of Turkey | 3rd Parliament of Turkey; Kazım Özalp; 2 September 1927 – 4 May 1931 | Succeeded by 4th Parliament of Turkey |
