= 4th cabinet of the Executive Ministers of Turkey =

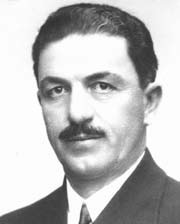
Rauf (Orbay) Bey

The 4th cabinet of executive ministers of Turkey (12 July 1922- 4 August 1923 ) was the fourth government formed by the nationalists during the Turkish War of Independence. The Republic was not yet proclaimed and the government was called İcra vekilleri heyeti ("cabinet of executive ministers")

== Background ==
The chairman of the cabinet (equivalent to prime minister) was Rauf Bey (later named Orbay) who had recently returned from Malta after being arrested by the Allies of World War I. Both Rauf Bey and the other members of the cabinet were elected by the parliament one by one.

== The government ==
In the list below, the name in parathesis is the surname the cabinet members assumed later.(see Surname Law of 1934)

Title	Name	Dates
Chairman	Rauf (Orbay)	
Ministry of Sharia and the Foundations	Abdullah Azmi (Torun); Mehmet Vehbi (Bolak)	12 July 1922 - 26 October 1922; 26 October 1922 - 4 August 1923
Minister of Justice	Rifat (Çalık)	
Minister of General Staff	Fevzi (Çakmak)	
Minister of Defense	Kazım (Özalp)	
Minister of Interior	İsmail Sefa (Özler); Ali Fethi (Okyar)	12 July 1922 - 5 November 1922 - 4 August 1923
Minister of Foreign Affairs	Yusuf Kemal (Tengirşek); İsmet (İnönü)	12 July 1922 - 26 October 1922; 26 October 1922 - 4 August 1923
Minister of Economy	Mahmut Esat (Bozkurt)	
Minister of Education	Mehmet Vehbi (Bolak); İsmail Sefa (Özler)	12 July 1922 - 5 November 1922; 5 November 1922 - 4 August 1923
Minister of Finance	Hasan Fehmi (Ataç)	
Minister of Public Works	Fevzi (Pirinççioğlu)	
Minister of Health and Social Solidarity	Rıza Nur	12 July 1922 - 27 October 1922

In this cabinet, İsmet (İnönü) was the 1st and Rıza Nur was the 2nd delegates of the Turkish delegation to Conference of Lausanne.

Preceded by 3rd cabinet of the Executive Ministers of Turkey (Fevzi Pasha)	4th cabinet of the Executive Ministers of Turkey (Rauf Bey); 12 July 1922 - 9 August 1923	Succeeded by 5th cabinet of the Executive Ministers of Turkey (Fethi Bey)
