= Mahmut Esat Bozkurt =

Turkish politician

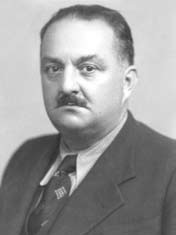
- Mahmut Esat in the 1930s

Minister of Economy
- In office 12 July 1922 – 24 September 1923
- Prime Minister: Rauf Bey, Fethi Bey
- Preceded by: Hasan Saka
- Succeeded by: Hasan Saka

Minister of Justice
- In office 22 November 1924 – 27 September 1930
- Prime Minister: İsmet İnönü; Fethi Okyar
- Preceded by: Mustafa Necati
- Succeeded by: Yusuf Kemal Bey

Personal details
- Born: Mahmut Esat; 1892 Kuşadası, Aydın Vilayet, Ottoman Empire
- Died: December 21, 1943 (aged 50–51) Istanbul, Turkey
- Party: Republican People's Party (CHP)
- Education: Law
- Alma mater: Istanbul University's Law School
- Occupation: Jurist, politician and academic
- Known for: Turkish civil code (1926), Lotus case

Mahmut Esat Bozkurt (1892 – 21 December 1943) was a Turkish jurist, politician, government minister and academic. His birth name was Mahmut Esat. But after the adaptation of the Turkish Surname Law in 1934, he chose the surname Bozkurt in remembrance of the Grey Wolf, a symbol for Turkdom. The surname also refers to the Turkish steamer S.S. Bozkurt in the Lotus case. He was in the intellectual environment of the Turkish Hearths for almost two decades.

== Life ==
Mahmut Esat was born to Hasan Bey of Hacı Mahmutoğulları in Kuşadası, Aydın Vilayet during the Ottoman Empire era in 1892. His family came to Kuşadası from Mora as refugees because of the Greek uprising. His father, Hasan Bey, became mayor of Kuşadası in 1900. He finished the idadi (high school) in İzmir in 1908. The same year he entered the Istanbul University's School of Law, from which he graduated in 1912. He traveled to Fribourg, Switzerland for further studies. He completed his doctorate thesis Du régime des capitulations ottomanes ("On the Capitulations of the Ottoman Empire") with summa cum laude, "highest honor" at the University of Fribourg. In Lausanne, he served as the leader of the Turkish Student Association. As such he worked closely with Şükrü Saraçoğlu, then a leader of the Turkish society in Geneva.

In June 1919, after Greek landing at Smyrna, he returned home to join the Kemalists in the Turkish War of Independence. He secretly traveled in an Italian ship together with Saraçoğlu. The ship was also carrying ammunition to the Italian occupation troops in Anatolia. Although he was arrested by the Italians, he managed to escape.

== Politics ==
He became a member of the Turkish parliament established on 23 April 1920 and held this post up to his death in 1943. Before the proclamation of the Republic and in the 4th cabinet of the Executive Ministers of Turkey, he was appointed Minister of Economy in 1922. As Minister of Economy, he attempted to alleviate the financial situation for the farmers and together with the leader of the Nationalist Movement Mustafa Kemal advocated for the Turkification of the Turkish economy at the First Economic Congress in Izmir. He held this post in the 5th cabinet of the Executive Ministers of Turkey up to 24 September 1923. After the Republic was proclaimed on 29 October 1923, he was elected a deputy of İzmir and served as Minister of Justice in the 3rd, 4th and the 5th government of Turkey between 22 November 1924 – 27 September 1930.

=== Minister of Justice ===
As Minister of Justice, he was member of the Reform Council for the East (Turkish: Şark İslahat Encümeni) who prepared the Report for Reform in the East (Turkish: Şark İslahat Raporu) which recommended to resettlement of the Kurds and the prohibition of non-Turkish languages. It was Mahmut Esat, who introduced the Swiss Civil Code in Turkey in 1926. Mahmut Esat is known as the progenitor of Turkish civil code. The preamble of the code written by Mahmut Esat is considered to reflect the philosophy of Turkish Revolution. Parallel to being a Minister of Justice he was teaching at the Kemalist lesson History of the Revolutions at the Ankara University since 1925.

=== Lotus case ===
Mahmut Esat was also known by his struggles in an international trial named the Lotus case. On 2 August 1926, a French steamship named S.S. Lotus collided on high seas with the Turkish steamer S.S. Bozkurt causing the death of eight Turkish seamen. As the lieutenant on watch duty of the French vessel was arrested by the Turkish government, French government accused Turkey in the Permanent Court of International Justice claiming that Turkey had no right to arrest any French person. The French side was represented in court by the renowned law professor Jules Basdevant. Mahmut Esat personally defended the Turkish position in court. The court rejected France's position.

In 1934, when Turkey adopted the formal surname system, Mahmut Esat chose the surname Bozkurt as a reminiscence of the case.

=== Political views ===
Regarding women's rights, he rejected polygamy, the muslim veil or privileges for a man when it comes to divorce. He was a fierce advocate of Turkishness and equated the Kemalist policies as similar to the Italian fascism of Benito Mussolini and in 1930 he claimed absolute superiority of the Turkish race, saying, "I believe that the Turk must be the only lord, the only master of this country. Those who are not of pure Turkish stock can have only one right in this country, the right to be servants and slaves." He was a member of the environment of the Turkish Hearths since his times in Switzerland.

== Later years ==
After resigning from the post of Justice Minister, he kept on working at the Ankara University, for which he became a professor and taught International law at the Law School and Constitutional law at the Faculty of Political Science. He authored the books Lotus Davasında Türkiye-Fransa Müdafaaları (1927), Türk İhtilalinde Vatan Müdafaası (1934), Türk Köylü ve İşçilerinin Hakları (1939), Devletlerarası Hak (1940), Atatürk İhtilali (1940) and Aksak Timur’un Devlet Politikası (1943).

He died from intracerebral hemorrhage in Istanbul on 21 December 1943.

== Works ==
- Lotus Davasında Türkiye-Fransa Müdafaaları (1927) ("The Defenses of Turkey-France in the Lotus Case")
- Masonlar Dinleyiniz! (1932) ("Freemasons, Listen Up!")
- Liberallik Masalı (1932) ("The Fable of Liberalism")
- Türk İhtilalinde Vatan Müdafaası (1934) ("Defense of Motherland in the Turkish Revolution")
- Türk Köylü ve İşçilerinin Hakları (1939) ("Rights of the Turkish Peasant and Workers")
- Devletlerarası Hak (1940) ("International Law")
- Atatürk İhtilali (1940) ("Atatürk's Revolution")
- Aksak Timur’un Devlet Politikası (1943) ("State policy of Timur the Lame")
