= Ministry of the Navy (Turkey) =

Government ministry, 1924–1927

The Ministry of the Navy (Turkish: Bahriye Vekaleti) was a former government ministry in Turkey. During the first two governments of Turkey the naval affairs were managed by a directorate. But on 22 November 1924 during the formation of the 3rd government of Turkey a new ministry was established for the naval affairs. However soon the ministry was blamed for a chain of accidents during the maintenance of the battle cruiser Yavuz. The minister was put on trial and the ministry was abolished at the end of the 4th government of Turkey on 1 November 1927. The responsibility of the ministry was transferred to the Ministry of National Defense.

== Aftermath ==
On 6 July 2011, during the formation of the 61st government of Turkey the name of the ministry of Transport and Communication was changed to Ministry of Transport, Maritime Affairs and Communication, but this ministry is responsible only in civilian maritime affairs.

== Ministers of the Navy ==
Name of the minister	Party	Duration
İhsan (Eryavuz)	Republican People's Party	22 November 1924- 1 November 1927

== See also ==
- Ottoman Ministry of the Navy
