= Nation's school =

Adult literacy campaign

Nation’s school (Turkish: Millet mektebi) was the name of a campaign of series of courses offered to adults to learn the Latin script-based Turkish alphabet in Turkey in 1929–1932.

== Background ==
The Ottoman Empire, like many Islamic countries, used the Arabic script, even though it was not able to reproduce certain Turkish vowels. Because the alphabet stemmed from the Quran, it was considered unalterable. After the collapse of the Empire, the leader of the Turkish Republic, Mustafa Kemal Atatürk, adopted the Latin script in 1928, adjusting it to suit the Turkish language: omitting "Q", "W" and "X", and adding diacritical marks to create umlaut versions of "O", "U" and "I", and the accented letters "Ç", "Ş" and "Ğ". (Note: In English such accented letters are usually written Ch, Sh and Gh)

== Alphabet reform ==
In June 1928, Atatürk asked Mustafa Necati, the Minister of National Education to form a committee to adopt the Latin script. On 9 August 1928, Atatürk announced that the Latin script would replace the Arabic script. On 1 November 1928, the parliament passed the law of the new Turkish alphabet as Act no 1353, and on 11 November 1928, the government decided to establish the "nation’s school". The project started on 24 November 1928. These schools were actually series of short courses for the adults. According to Falih Rıfkı Atay, a member of the committee, learning of the Latin script was more difficult for the literate people, who already used Arabic script than for the illiterate people. He added that if the rate of literacy had not been so low, the alphabet reform would be impossible to apply.

== First day of the campaign ==
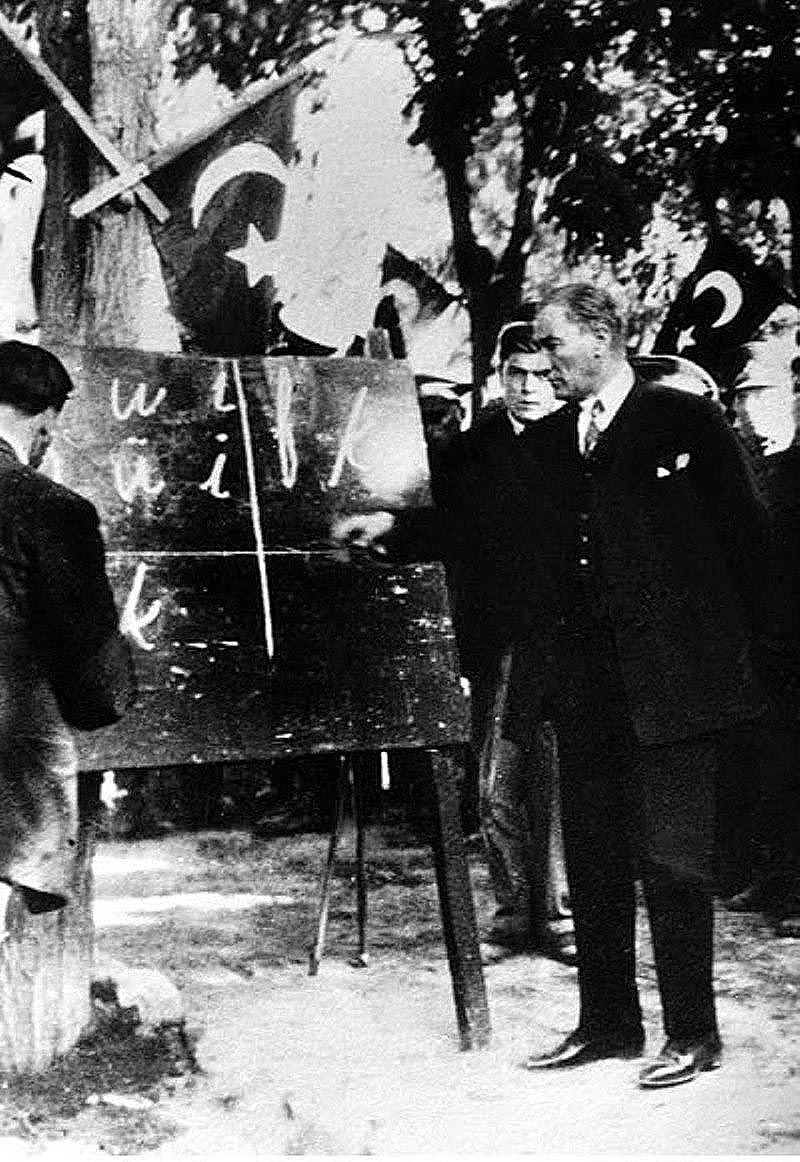
Atatürk introducing the new Turkish alphabet in Kayseri.

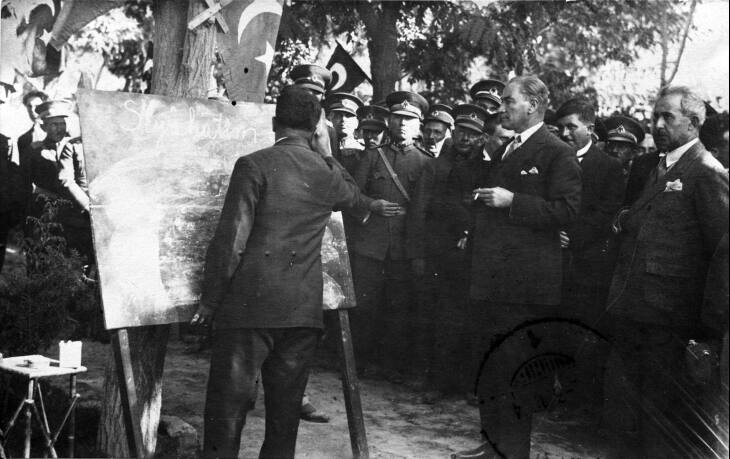
Atatürk introducing Turkish alphabet in Sivas.

The first example of the Nation’s school was set in Dolmabahçe Palace. Beginning by 1 January 1929, many schools were opened all over the country. Mustafa Necati, who was responsible for these schools, died on the very same day the schools opened due to appendicitis. He is now considered as one of the pioneers of the Turkish alphabet.

== School regulations ==
According to regulations, these schools were compulsory for everybody in the age group of 14–45 years. Two courses per week were offered to women while four courses a week were available for men. The duration was 2–4 months depending on the prior education of the participants. The courses were also offered to prisoners. In the 1930s, most villages had no schools. For these villages mobile teaching teams were formed. All participants were expected to pass a final exam to obtain a certificate. The top scoring participant of each school received a signed photo of Atatürk and a book of the Turkish constitution.

Atatürk, who earned the title başöğretmen (literally "head teacher") actively participated in the Nation’s school program, and taught the new alphabet at his travels.

== Conclusion ==
In the first year, the number of schools, actually classrooms, was 20,487, and the number of participants was 1,075,500. 485,632 men and 111,378 women received certificates. At the end of the term in the 1930s, the total number of the graduates reached 1,217,144.

== Commemoration ==
Beginning by 1981, 24 November, being the start day of the project, is commemorated each year as "Teacher's day" in Turkey.

== See also ==
- Education in Turkey
