= Urban flight =

Urban flight, sometimes referred to as suburban colonization, is the movement of people from an urban area to its suburbs. The phenomenon is often studied for the effects that it has on the city, especially the reduction of political power and the reduction of tax revenue which occurs as a result of the depopulation.

== Services and taxes favor suburbs ==
As hinterlands acquire more population and more power then, according to the one man one vote principle, they get more votes in representative bodies, notably metropolitan regions or greater urban areas such as the Greater Toronto Area Greater Montreal, Greater Paris or Greater London. Suburban votes then come to outweigh inner city votes, just as, a century earlier, urbanization or urban colonization diminished the power of rural voters.

Decisions of these bodies accordingly begin to favor people who live in suburbs, providing more car-oriented and commuter services and more favorable property tax rates for single family homes as tenants in downtown apartment buildings pay higher rates. In urban areas that are growing rapidly, services may be developed that favor urban sprawl, such as large trunk sewers, express highways or shopping malls, as other services such as youth recreation disappear from downtown areas. This increases population drain to the suburbs as quality of life drops, but the increased population may then drive more people further out to the hinterland which increases the political rewards (especially political donations from real estate developers building greenfield developments) for sprawl.

== Urban bankruptcy requires outside aid ==
In very extreme cases, where cities are unable to recover costs of serving a vast suburban hinterland and are politically controlled by a larger jurisdiction, such as Manhattan within New York State, cities may go bankrupt as New York City in fact did in the 1970s. This had been predicted by urbanists including Jane Jacobs who had fought Robert Moses and his plan for the Cross-Manhattan Expressway system which was eventually defeated. The City only recovered with federal aid and urban autonomy rights including the right to levy its own income tax which it still has.

== Suburban flight polarizes communities ==
Cities with impoverished downtown services can suffer riots or major unrest, as Los Angeles and Detroit did in the 1960s to 1980s. Such incidents speed the flight of middle class residents to the suburbs and sometimes to gated community developments where they are insulated from urban problems, and consume a very different range of services than downtown residents, which again are favored strongly by political representatives.

== Forced mergers further reduce downtown power ==
In some cases, notably Toronto and Montreal in the 1990s, a larger political unit will force smaller urban units to merge against the will of residents, and this further increases the hold of the outer suburban regions as they hold a majority of seats in the new aggregated city council. Where a strong mayor system applies, the larger number of suburban residents will likely also control that post, and the need to campaign over a larger urban area will tend to exclude grassroots candidates or anti-poverty activist candidates not funded nor supported by wealthier suburban voters or real estate developers. Those who speak for the city may live on its outer edges. Mayors may be former mayors of former suburban cities such as Mel Lastman, former mayor of North York who became Mayor of Toronto once those cities (and three others) were merged in 1998.

The political consequences of both mergers were severe. In Quebec, the Parti Québécois government was defeated by Jean Charest who permitted Montreal to hold a referendum in which it was permitted to de-amalgamate politically and regain its separate pre-merger urban identities by 2006. In Toronto no such relief occurred but a Province of Toronto movement emerged under Jane Jacobs (who had moved to Toronto in the 1960s and again fought expressways penetrating the downtown there, notably the Spadina Expressway and Front Street Extension), 2000 Lastman opponent Tooker Gomberg and Mayor in 2003 (after Lastman) David Miller.

A more consequential effect of the merger in Toronto involved the Ford family dynasty, whose members went from representing the independent western suburb of Etobicoke (a mainly industrial and corporate community with representation being mainly tailored to their interests over local residents), to becoming a strong part of an amalgamated Toronto, with former city councillor Rob Ford being the city's mayor from 2010 until 2014 (which ended in scandal), and Doug Ford, who also represented Etobicoke after Rob's mayorship began, being Premier of Ontario since 2018 and often governing in conflict with the city and encouraging suburban development and transportation projects over projects involving Toronto's urban core.

== Theoretical analyses ==
Joel Garreau in Edge City described the growth of cities on the edge of major urban areas, which became population and power centres in themselves.

Stephen Dale in Lost in the Suburbs described a cultural and political gap that occurred in New Jersey and Ontario in the early 1990s when suburban voters began to outnumber urban or rural voters, and began to perceive that they were paying taxes to provide urban areas with services that were not duplicated in their community. Meanwhile, suburban communities would export problems to the cities, typically in the form of drug addicts, homelessness, smog, prostitution and other crimes serving suburban residents, and the need to accommodate a large number of commuters and their sewage and parking requirements. As downtown residents and suburban voters became estranged, each perceived themselves subsidizing the other, and accordingly a common solution, called in both New Jersey and Ontario the Common Sense Revolution, transferred funds from urban needs to suburban sprawl, triggering a decline in urban quality of life in both places, as population further spread out and downtowns became more hostile to suburban visitors.

== See also ==
- Suburbanization
- Core-periphery
- Internal colonialism
- Rural flight
