= 5th government of Turkey =

Government of the Republic of Turkey (1927–1930)

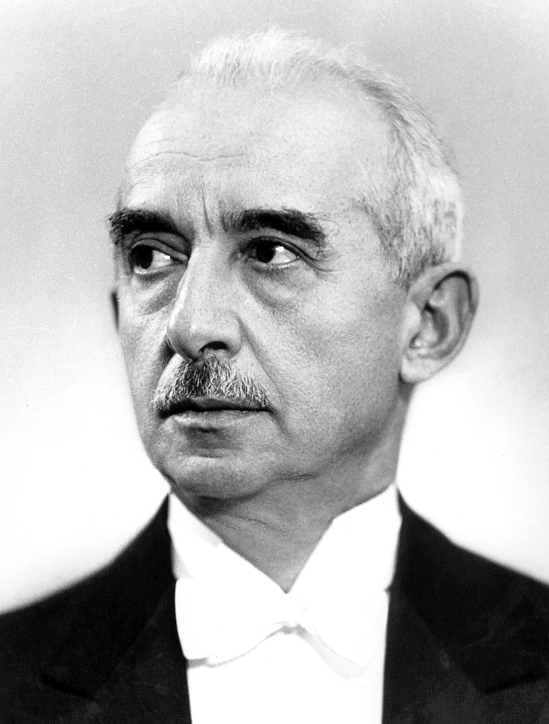
İsmet İnönü

The 5th government of Turkey (1 November 1927 – 27 September 1930) was a government in the history of Turkey. It is also called the fourth İnönü government

== Background ==
The government was formed after Kemal Atatürk was elected as the president of Turkey for the second time. The prime minister was İsmet İnönü of the Republican People's Party (CHP), who was also the prime minister of the previous government.

== The government ==
In the list below, the cabinet members who served only a part of the cabinet's lifespan are shown in the column "Notes".

Title	Name	Notes
Prime Minister	İsmet İnönü	
Ministry of Justice	Mahmut Esat Bozkurt	
Ministry of National Defense and Navy	Abdülhalik Renda	
Ministry of the Interior	Şükrü Kaya	
Ministry of Foreign Affairs	Tevfik Rüştü Aras	
Ministry of Finance	Şükrü Saracoğlu	
Ministry of National Education	Mustafa Necati Uğural; Vasıf Çınar; Hüsnü Taray	1 November 1927 – 1 January 1929; 2 March 1929 – 13 April 1929; 13 April 1929 – 22 September 1930
Ministry of Public Works	Behiç Erkin; Recep Peker	1 November 1927 – 15 October 1928; 15 October 1928 – 27 September 1930
Ministry of Health and Social Security	Refik Saydam	
Ministry of Economy	Rahmi Köken; Şakir Kesebir	21 January 1928 – 29 May 1929; 29 May 1929 – 27 September 1930
Ministry of Commerce; Ministry of Agriculture Forestry and Village Affairs	Rahmi Köken	1 November 1927 – 21 January 1928

In 1927–1930, surnames were not yet in use in Turkey, which would remain true until the Surname Law. The surnames given in the list are the surnames the members of the cabinet assumed later.

== Aftermath ==
On 12 August, President Mustafa Kemal Atatürk asked Fethi Okyar, a former prime minister (3rd government of Turkey), to form an opposition party, the Liberal Republican Party, in order to try to jump-start multi-party democracy in Turkey for the second time. Due to the Great Depression, the government was losing support to the new party, and İnönü tried to regain strength by forming a new government.

Preceded by 4th government of Turkey (İsmet İnönü)	5th Government of Turkey; 1 November 1927 – 27 September 1930	Succeeded by 6th government of Turkey (İsmet İnönü)
