= Müfide İlhan =

First female city mayor in Turkey

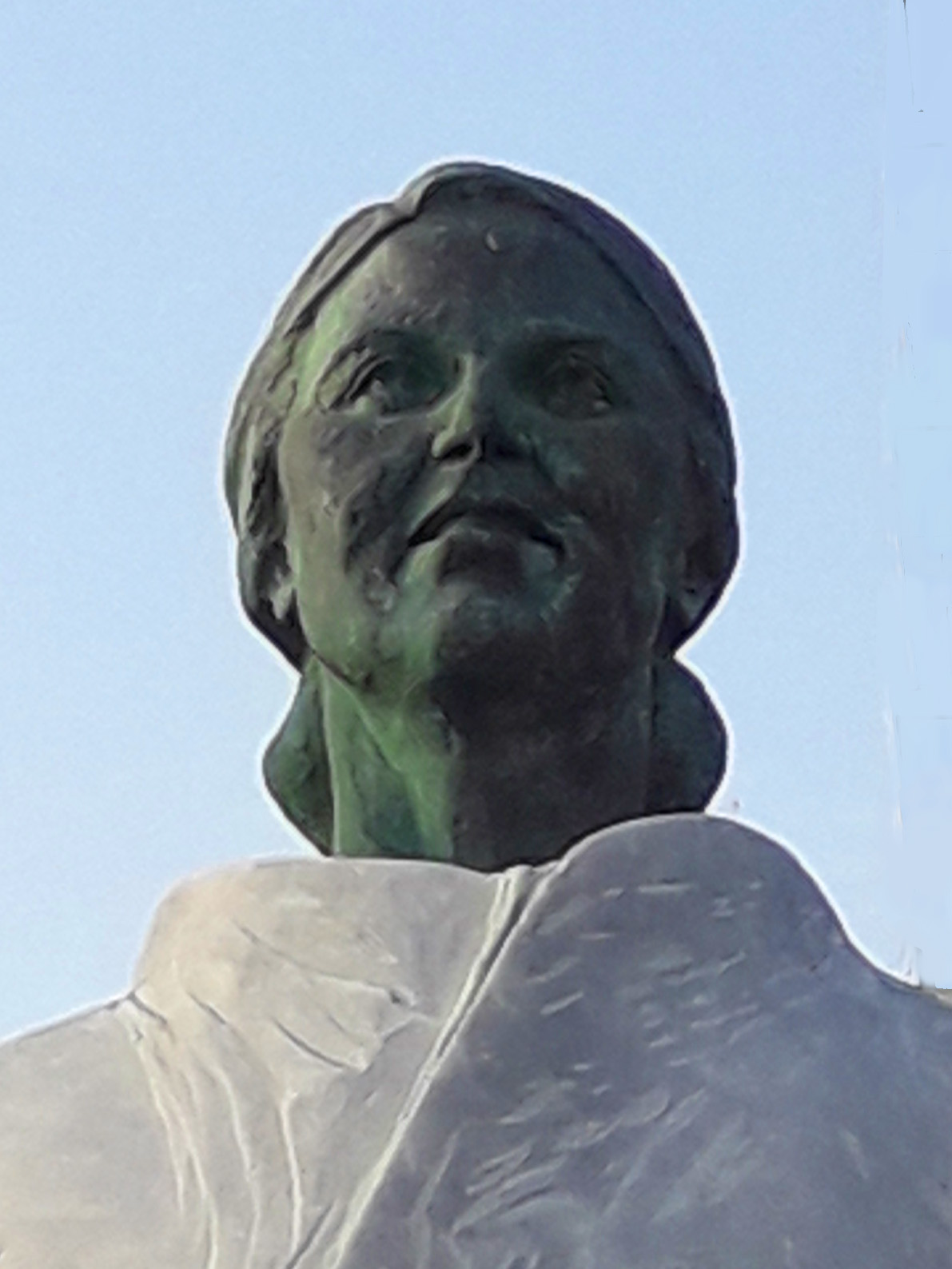
- Born: 19 February 1911; Istanbul, Ottoman Empire
- Died: 2 February 1996 (aged 83); Bodrum, Turkey
- Occupations: Teacher; politician
- Known for: First woman mayor in Turkey

Müfide İlhan (19 February 1911 – 2 February 1996) was a Turkish politician. She was the mayor of Mersin in the early 1950s and is known as being the first woman mayor in Turkey.

== Early life ==
Müfide İlhan was born on 19 February 1911 in Istanbul. Her father was Mustafa Nazif, an army officer and her mother was Emine, a homemaker. She was only four years of age when her father Nafiz fell at Conk Bayırı during the Gallipoli campaign in the World War I. After the war, she was sent to Ankara, where she completed her elementary education. After the liberation of Istanbul, she moved to Istanbul and completed her secondary education in the Kandilli High School for Girls. In 1928 she finished teachers' college. After finishing the college she began serving as a teacher in Istanbul.

== First marriage ==
In 1928 she married Nuri Çetinkaya an army officer. She accompanied her husband in various Turkish cities such as Erzurum and Kırklareli. When her husband was appointed as the Turkish military attaché to Berlin, Germany she studied at Pestalozzi-Fröbel-Haus Institute. However, in 1936 the couple divorced and Müfide returned to Ankara.

== Second marriage ==
In Ankara she met with Doctor Faruk İlhan. But Faruk İlhan had to travel to Kabul, Afghanistan to establish the Medicine school of Kabul University. They married in Kabul. In 1945 towards the end of World War II, the couple decided to return to Turkey. But because of the war-time hardships and unrest in Karachi, the couple was not able to sail back. So, they returned home by a car over Iran, which seemed impossible to many people in 1945. In 1946, they decided to settle in Mersin, Faruk İlhan's home city.

== Political life ==
In Mersin she began to get interested in politics. The Democrat Party (DP) defeated the Republican People's Party (CHP) in 1950 general elections, thus ended 27-years rule of the CHP, which later on was called the 'white revolution'. Müfide İlhan became the mayor of Mersin as the candidate of DP on 3 September 1950 elections, and she created sensation both at home and abroad for being the first ever female mayor of Turkey, at a time when the participation of Turkish women in politics was still considerably low. She was invited to Great Britain.

İlhan, as most reformists of the day, was against the authoritarian administration of pre-1950 CHP government. However she was not against the ideology of CHP, so called Kemalism. Thus, some early moves of DP government, which seemed to be against Kemalism, disappointed her. For example, it was difficult for her to accept DP government's lift of the ban on Arabic ezan. It was the CHP government, which initiated ezan in Turkish in 1932 instead of in traditional Arabic.

On 17 December 1951, after a year of extensive work, she resigned from her post. After a while she also resigned from the party. She formed a league named 'League for supporting independent candidates' in Mersin. She also published a short lived bulletin named Mücadele (English: Struggle). However, after her husband was appointed to İzmit as chief physician she left Mersin in 1955.

== Other activities ==
Between 1968 and 1981 she worked as a teacher in Germany for Turkish immigrants. She worked in a number of social associations. In her later years she donated to hospitals and a retirement home in Mersin.

== Personal life ==
Müfide had seven children; two daughters from the first marriage, one son and three daughters from the second marriage and one adopted son. In 1965, she was elected as the 'mother of the year' by the Turkish Association of Mothers.

== Legacy ==
A neighborhood in Akdeniz municipality and a public park in Yenişehir municipality are named after her. One of the art galleries of İçel Sanat Kulübü (the main art club of Mersin) is also named after her. On 4 April 2015 the municipality of Mersin erected a statue of Müfide İlhan

== See also ==
- Women in Turkish politics
- Gülkız Ürbül
