= Mehmet Cemil Uybadın =

Turkish politician

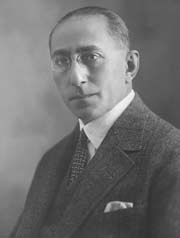

Member of the Grand National Assembly

Personal details
- Born: 1880 Constantinople, Ottoman Empire
- Died: 1957 (aged 76–77)

Mehmet Cemil Uybadın (1880, Constantinople, Ottoman Empire – 1957) was a Turkish career officer and politician.

== Biography ==
He was born in 1880 in Constantinople. In 1905, he completed his military education and became a staff captain. He participated in the Balkan Wars and World War I. He carried out various duties in the Turkish War of Independence. He retired when he was promoted to lieutenant colonel. From 1923, he was in the Turkish parliament as a deputy from Tekirdağ. He served as the secretary general of the Republican People's Party (CHP) (1924–25) and as the interior minister (1925–27). As Minister for the Interior, he was part of the Reform Council for the East (Turkish: Şark Islahat Encümeni) that prepared the Report for Reform in the East (Turkish: Şark Islahat Raporu) which recommended the suppression and resettlement of the Kurds and the creation of Inspectorates-Generals which would include provinces with a Kurdish population. Following this report, three Inspectorates-Generals were to be created. He died in 1957.
