= Gülkız Ürbül =

Turkish partisan and politician

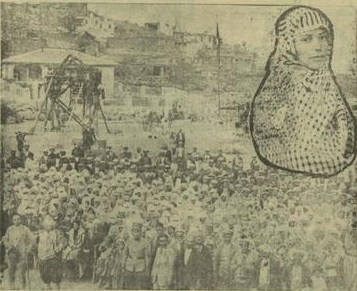
Gül Esin, Türkiye's first female village head, and the people who elected her.

Gülkız Ürbül (1901–1990) was a Turkish woman who became the first female muhtar (village chief) in Turkey in 1933. She later changed her name to Gül Esin Aydın.

== Background ==
Before 1930, women had no political rights in Turkey. Act no. 1580 of 3 April, 1930, gave women suffrage in local elections. Three years later, Act no. 2349 of 26 October 1933, allowed women to be eligibile for the post of muhtar.

Two weeks later, Ürbül was elected the muhtar of Demircidere village, Çine ilçe district, in Aydın Province. She was the first woman elected to political office in Turkey.

== Election and service term ==
In the 1930s, Gülkız Ürbül was one of the few literate village women in Turkey. During the First World War and Turkish War of Independence, she lost her husband and five of her six brothers. In the election campaign, she ran against seven male candidates and won the muhtar election. During her short term, she banned gambling, initiated the construction of a road between her village and Çine, and founded a cooperative to build a village room.

== Feedbacks ==
After the election, Mehmet Ali Bey, the governor of Çine, said that the district was proud to be the pioneer in having the first female muhtar in Turkey. Recep Peker, the secretary-general of the Republican People's Party (and later prime minister from 1946 to 1947), sent a telegram and congratulated Ürbül on becoming the first Turkish female muhtar and political officeholder.

== Death and legacy ==
Ürbül spent the last 20 years of her life in the Nazilli district of Aydın Province, where she died on the 18 December 1990. In 2011, the municipality of Aydın erected a bust of Gülkız.

== See also ==
- Women in Turkish politics
- Müfide İlhan
