= 1925 Report for Reform in the East (Turkey) =

Reform plan for the Kurdish territories in Turkey

The Report for Reform in the East (Turkish: Şark Islahat Raporu, or Şark Islahat Planı) was a report prepared by the Reform Council for the East (Turkish: Şark Islahat Encümeni) in response to the Sheik Said rebellion. The Reform Council was created on 8 September 1925 by Mustafa Kemal Atatürk and presided over by İsmet İnönü. Its members were selected from the highest political and military authorities like Chief of Staff Marshal Mustafa Fevzi Çakmak, Justice Minister Mahmut Esat Bozkurt, Commerce Minister Ali Cenani, Kâzım Özalp Şükrü Kaya, Abdülhalik Renda and Celâl Bayar.

On 25 September 1925, the Reform Council for the East presented its report in the Grand National Assembly of Turkey with the following recommendations for a reform plan (Şark Islahat Planı).

- To impede the emergence of a Kurdish elite as a governing body
- To resettle people whom the government believed might frustrate their policies
- To reunite the provinces to the east of the Euphrates River under an administrative subdivision called the Inspectorate General which would be ruled with martial law for an indefinite time
- To forbid both the use of non-Turkish languages and the employment of Kurds in "second-level offices"
- To provide 7 million Turkish liras for the resettlement of the Kurds in other areas

The report encouraged several resettlement laws and the establishment of three Inspectorates Generals which included provinces with a Kurdish majority. In the Inspectorates the use of the Kurdish language was prohibited in government buildings, schools or markets, and Turkish officials could punish the use of Kurdish according to a law that included fixed tariffs for each word in the Kurdish.

== See also ==
- 1934 Turkish Resettlement Law
- Citizen, speak Turkish!
- Independence Tribunal of Diyarbekir
