= İhsan Eryavuz =

Turkish politician

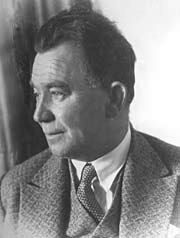
- Born: 1877; Scutari (Üsküdar), Ottoman Empire
- Died: 6 March 1947 (aged 69–70); Istanbul, Turkey
- Military career
- Allegiance: Ottoman Empire
- Service years: Ottoman Empire: 26 January 1901 – 21 January 1919
- Rank: Lieutenant colonel
- Conflicts: Balkan Wars; First World War
- Other work: Member of the GNAT (Cebel-i Bereket); Minister of the Navy; Member of the administrative board of the Türkiye İş Bankası

İhsan Eryavuz, also known as "Topçu" İhsan ("Artilleryman" Ihsan), Mehmet İhsan Bey (1877– 6 March 1947) was a Turkish career officer, government minister and politician. He served as an officer of the Ottoman Army, and as a politician of the Republic of Turkey. He became Minister of the Navy in the cabinets of Ali Fethi Bey (Okyar) and Ismet Pasha (İnönü)

On 26 January 1928 Eryavuz was put on trial before the Supreme Court (formerly Ottoman Turkish: Divan'ı Ali, today Turkish: Yüce Divan) for charges on defraudation related to the repairs at the battlecruiser TCG Yavuz. He was sentenced to two years of aggravated imprisonment.

== Works ==
- Anılar (incomplete), Yeni Türkiye, 1946.

== Medals and decorations ==
- Medal of Independence with Green Ribbon

== Sources ==
Media related to İhsan Eryavuz at Wikimedia Commons
