= Mustafa Necati =

Turkish statesman

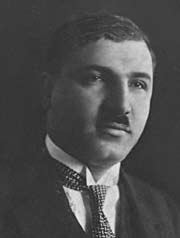

Minister of Exchange Construction and Settlement
- In office 30 October 1923 – 6 March 1924
- Prime Minister: İsmet İnönü
- Succeeded by: Celal Bayar

Ministry of Justice
- In office 6 March 1924 – 22 November 1924
- Prime Minister: İsmet İnönü
- Preceded by: Seyit Bey
- Succeeded by: Mahmut Esat Bozkurt

Ministry of National Education
- In office 21 December 1925 – 1 January 1929
- Prime Minister: İsmet İnönü
- Preceded by: Hamdullah Suphi Tanrıöver

Personal details
- Born: 1894 İzmir, Ottoman Empire
- Died: 1 January 1929 (aged 34–35) Ankara, Turkey
- Party: Republican People's Party
- Education: Law
- Alma mater: Law School, Istanbul University
- Occupation: Politician, civil servant
- Known for: Population exchange between Greece and Turkey; Nation's schools

Mustafa Necati, also known as Mustafa Necati Uğural (1894 - January 1, 1929) was a Turkish statesman in the early years of the Turkish Republic, who served as the Minister of National Education during the reform period. He died before the Turkish Surname Law was adopted and the surname Uğural is actually the surname his family members adopted after his death.

== Early years ==
Mustafa Necati was born in 1894 in İzmir. His father was Halit and his mother was Naciye. After his primary and secondary education in İzmir, he went to Istanbul for higher education and studied law. He returned to İzmir in 1914 to serve as a lawyer and teacher. In 1915 he established a private school with his friend Vasıf Çınar. He also served as a legal adviser for the local railway company. After the First World War in which the Ottoman Empire was defeated, the Allies fired the railway workers. He tried to defend the workers' rights by establishing a committee. Later he expanded his activities to defend the rights of the reserve officiers who returned from the front. After İzmir was occupied by the Greek army, he fled to Istanbul and then to Balıkesir, where he began to participate in the Turkish War of Independence. Among other things he published a short lived newspaper named İzmir'e Doğru ("Towards İzmir") to defend Turkish rights against Greek invasion.

== As a politician during the War of Independence ==
After the Ottoman parliament in Istanbul was abolished by the Allies on 16 March 1920, Turkish parliament was established in Ankara on 23 April 1920 and Mustafa Necati was elected as the Saruhan (present Manisa) MP. However, during the 1920-1922 term he spent most of his time out of Ankara. He was appointed as the member of Independence Tribunals in Sivas and then Kastamonu. Finally he was appointed as the chairman of Amasya Independence Tribunal.

== As a politician in the Republic of Turkey ==
As soon as the Republic was proclaimed on 29 October 1923, Mustafa Necati became a government minister of İsmet İnönü’s cabinets. His first seat was Minister of Exchange Construction and Settlement in the 1st government of Turkey. This was a very important seat for its main responsibility was the Population exchange between Greece and Turkey. In the 2nd government of Turkey he was the Minister of Justice. However his most important seat was that of Minister of National Education following a revision in the 4th government of Turkey. As such he presented the draft bill which allowed the establishment of the Language Council to the Turkish Parliament in March 1926. He kept this post in the 5th government of Turkey till his death.

== Nation schools ==
Up to June 1930, the Arabic script was used in Turkey. Proponents argued that because the Turkish language has eight vowels, the Arabic script did not fully represent Turkish words. Nevertheless, being the script of Quran it was considered to be inalterable. But president Atatürk decided to adopt Latin alphabet (with small changes). Moreover, he insisted that the reform should be carried out immediately. In addition to adding the Latin alphabet to school curricula, short term courses for the adults called Nation's schools (Turkish: Millet Mektebi) were established. As the minister of National Education, Mustafa Necati was responsible for establishing these courses. The courses were successful and Necati was later considered to be one of the pioneers of the new Turkish alphabet.

== Death ==
Mustafa Necati died due to appendicitis on 1 January 1929, the very same day the Nation Schools were opened. The next day he was laid to rest in Cebeci Asri Cemetery in Ankara.

== Discussion on Mustafa Necati’s house ==
In 2006 Mustafa Necati’s 3 story house, in Ankara on Mithatpaşa Caddesi, was set to be handed over to a restaurant chain, which sparked vigorous protests. Following an intense debate, the Turkish parliament decided, in 2008, to convert the house to a cultural center for MPs.

== Mustafa Necati in sports ==
Mustafa Necati was one of the founders of Altay sports club in 1914.
