= Women in Turkish politics =

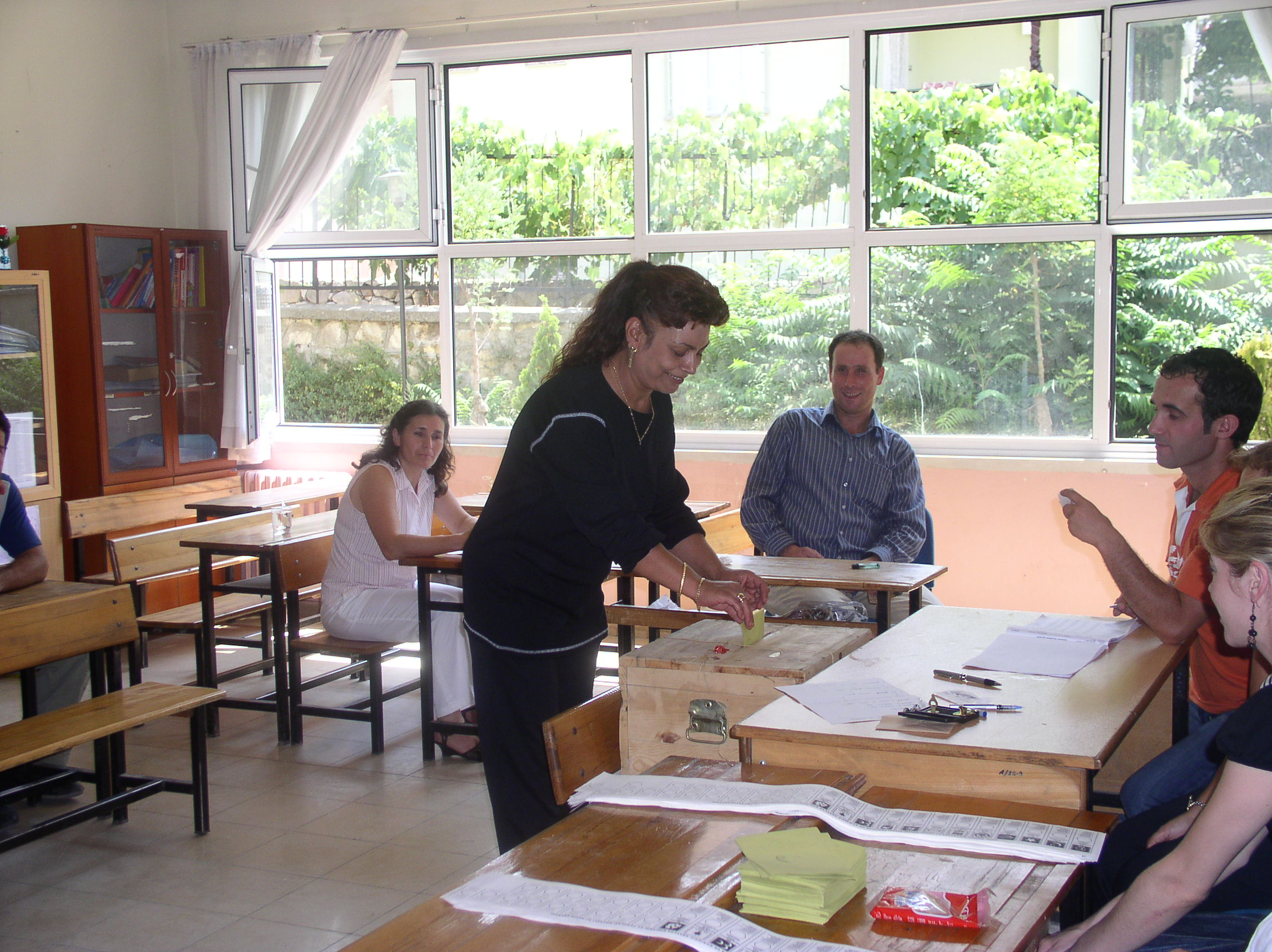
Women have had the right to vote in Turkey since 1934.

Women in Turkey have an active participation in national politics, and the number of women in the Turkish parliament has been increasing steadily in recent elections.

== Background ==
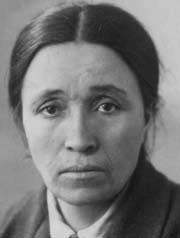
Hatı Çırpan, one of the first women in the Parliament of Turkey, 1935.

The Republic of Turkey was founded in the heartland of the disintegrating Ottoman Empire on 29 October 1923. Although the political influence of some Valide Sultans (queen mothers) over the Ottoman Sultans was considerable, especially during the era known as the Sultanate of Women, women had no chance to serve in any official political post in the Ottoman era.

One notable female political activist in the first days of the Republican era was Nezihe Muhiddin, who founded the first women's party in Turkey in June 1923; however, it was never legalized because the Republic was not officially declared yet. Mustafa Kemal Atatürk, the founder of the Republic initiated a series of reforms to modernize the country, including civil and political equality for women for the first time. On 17 February 1926, Turkey adopted a new civil code by which the rights of Turkish women and men were declared equal except in suffrage. Turkish women achieved voting rights in local elections by Act no. 1580 on 3 April 1930. Four years later, through legislation enacted on 5 December 1934, they gained full universal suffrage, earlier than many other countries.

== President ==
Turkey has not had a female president to date. Meral Akşener ran for office in the 2018 presidential election.

== Speaker of Parliament ==
Up to the present, there have been no female Speakers of Grand National Assembly in Turkey.

== Vice president ==
The post of vice President was established in 2018 and there have been no female Vice Presidents in Turkey.

== Prime Minister (1920–2018) ==
Tansu Çiller, a Turkish career professor of economics since 1983, entered politics in November 1990, joining the conservative True Path Party (DYP). On June 13, 1993, she was elected the party's leader, and on 25 June the same year, Çiller was appointed the Prime Minister of a coalition government, becoming Turkey's first and only female prime minister to date. She served at this post until 6 March 1996 in the 50th, 51st and the 52nd government of Turkey.

No.	Portrait	Prime Minister	Took office	Left office	Time in office	Government	President
22		Tansu Çiller (1946– )	25 June 1993	5 October 1995	2 year, 256 day	I. Çiller (50th government)	Süleyman Demirel
22		Tansu Çiller (1946– )	5 October 1995	30 October 1995	2 year, 256 day	II. Çiller (51st government)	Süleyman Demirel
22		Tansu Çiller (1946– )	30 October 1995	6 March 1996	2 year, 256 day	III. Çiller (52nd government)	Süleyman Demirel

Prime Minister office was abolished in Turkey in 2018.

== Government ministers ==
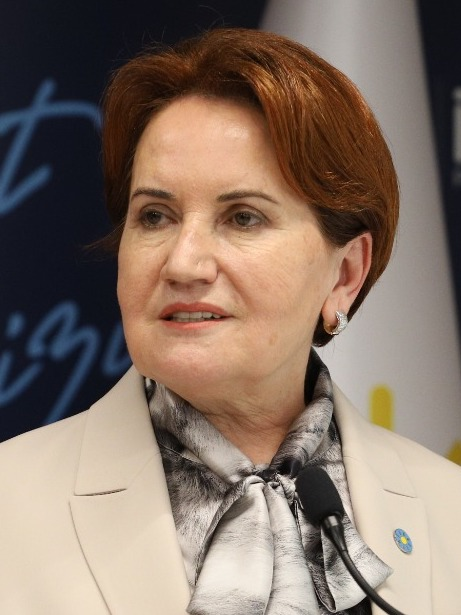
Turkey's first female Minister of the Interior Meral Akşener

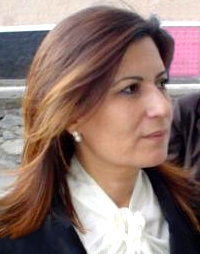
Turkey's first female Minister of National Education Nimet Baş

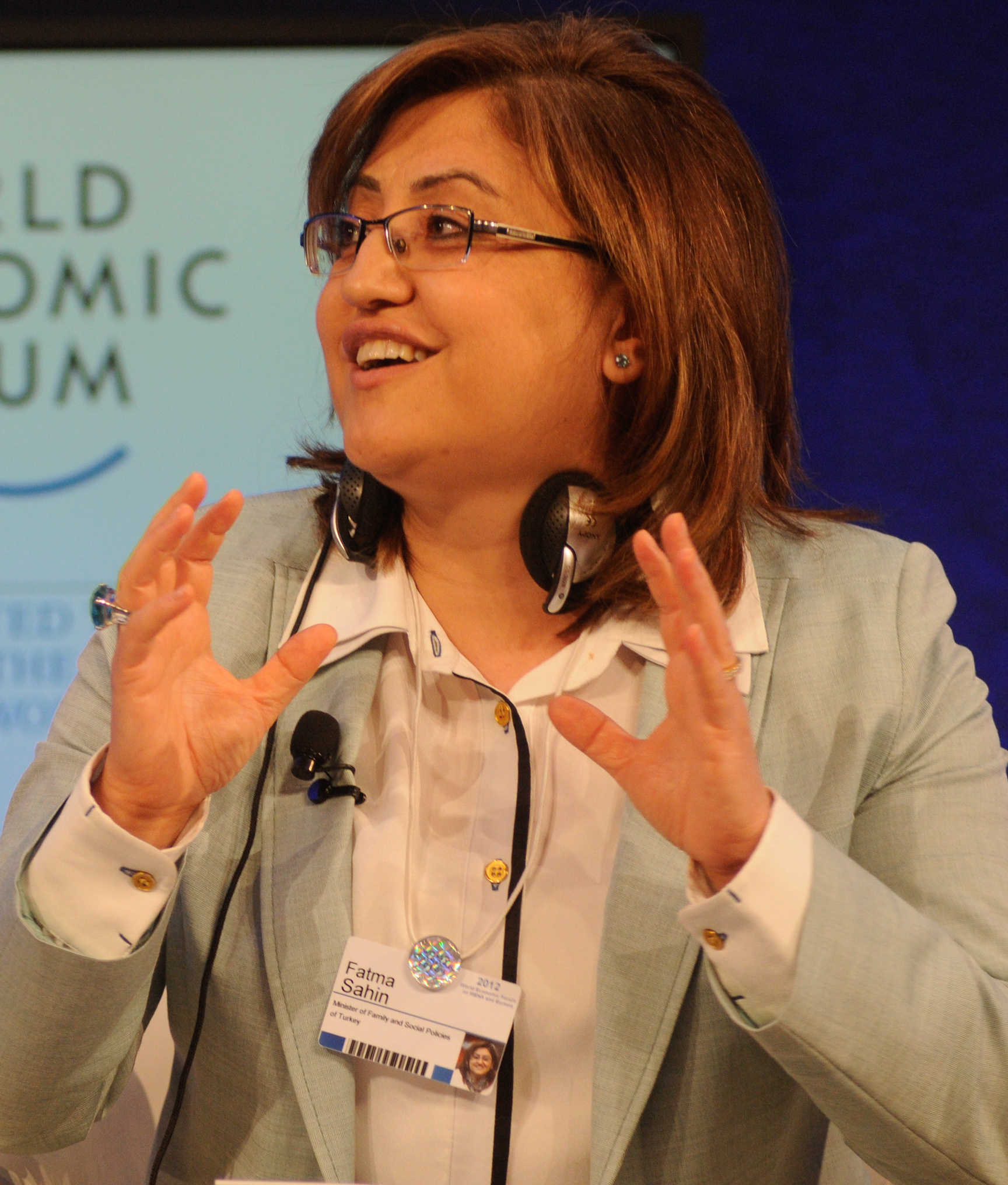
Turkey's first female Minister of Family, Labour and Social Services Fatma Şahin

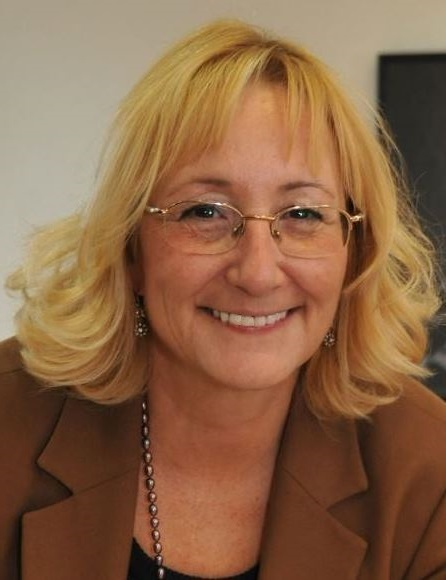
Turkey's first female Minister of European Union Affairs Beril Dedeoğlu

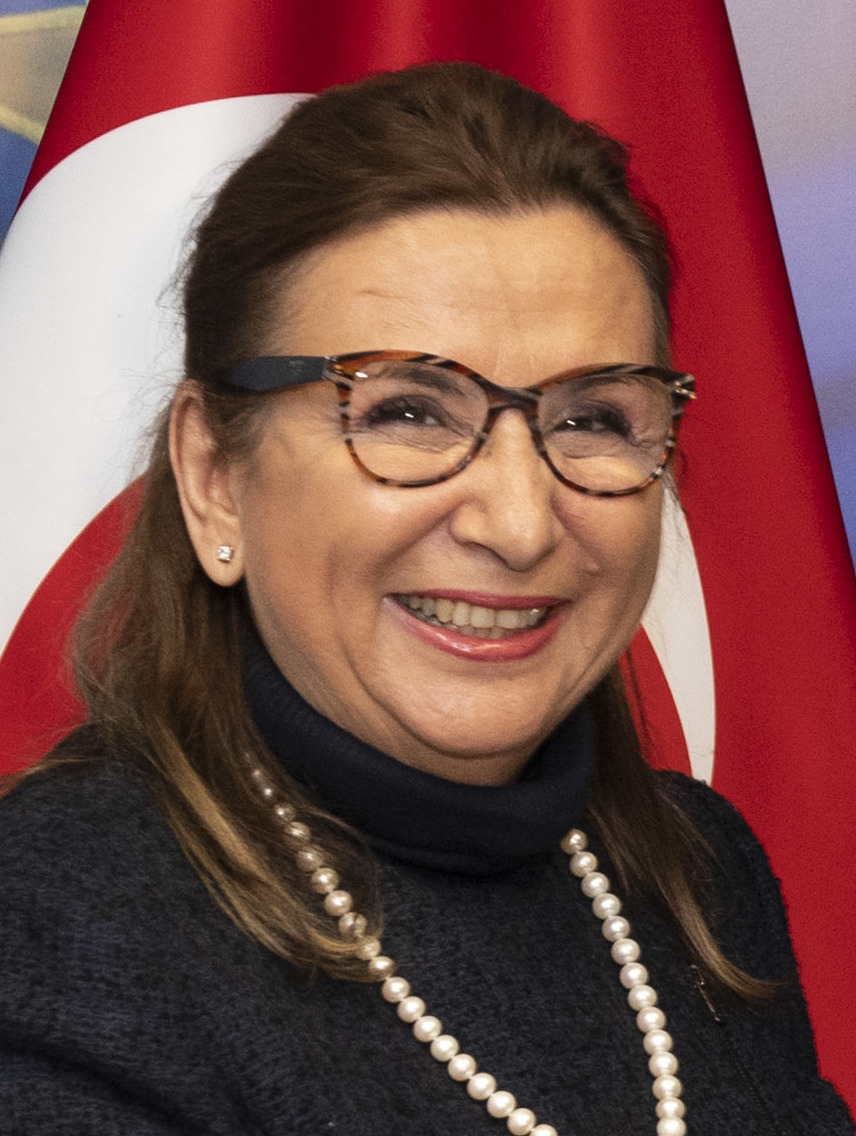
Turkey's first female Minister of Trade Ruhsar Pekcan

The first female Turkish government minister was Türkân Akyol, in 1971. She was the Minister of Health in Nihat Erim's technocratic government.(33rd government of Turkey) In 1983, she was one of the founders of SODEP, short for Social Democracy Party, a new party which went on to become one of the major political parties of Turkey in 1980s.

Female government ministers up to the present are as follows:

Name	Ministry	Party
Türkân Akyol (1928–2017)	Minister of Health and Social Security (1971)	Independent (Military supported government)
Türkân Akyol (1928–2017)	Minister of State (Family) 1992–1993	SHP
Nermin Neftçi (1924–2003)	Minister of Culture (1974–1975)	CGP
İmren Aykut (born 1940)	Minister of Labour and Social Security (1987–1991)	ANAP
İmren Aykut (born 1940)	Minister of State (1991 and 1996),	ANAP
İmren Aykut (born 1940)	Minister of Environment (1997–1999)	ANAP
Güler İleri (born 1948)	Minister of State (1991–1993)	SHP
Aysel Baykal (1939–2003)	Minister of State (1995–1995)	CHP
Önay Alpago (born 1947)	Minister of State (1994–1995)	SHP
Işılay Saygın (1947–2019)	Minister of State (1995–1996)	DYP
Işılay Saygın (1947–2019)	Minister of Environment (1996)	DYP
Işılay Saygın (1947–2019)	Minister of Tourism (1996)	DYP
Ayfer Yılmaz (born 1956)	Minister of State (1996–1997)	DYP
Tansu Çiller (born 1946)	Minister of Foreign Affairs (1996–1997)	DYP
Meral Akşener (born 1956)	Minister of Interior (1996–1997)	DYP
Tayyibe Gülek (born 1968)	Minister of State (1999–2002)	DSP
Melda Bayer (born 1950)	Minister of State (1999–2002)	DSP
Aysel Çelikel (born 1933)	Minister of Justice (2002)	Independent
Güldal Akşit (1960–2021)	Minister of Tourism (2002–2003)	AKP
Güldal Akşit (1960–2021)	Minister of State (2003–2007)	AKP
Nimet Baş (born 1965)	Minister of State (2003–2007)	AKP
Nimet Baş (born 1965)	Minister of National Education (2009–2011)	AKP
Selma Aliye Kavaf (born 1962)	Minister of State (Turkey) (2009–2011)	AKP
Fatma Şahin (born 1966)	Minister of Family and Social Policies (2011–2013)	AKP
Ayşenur İslam (born 1958)	Minister of Family and Social Policies (2013–2015)	AKP
Ayşen Gürcan (born 1963)	Minister of Family and Social Policies (2015)	Independent
Beril Dedeoğlu (1961–2019)	Minister of European Union (2015)	Independent
Fatma Betül Sayan Kaya (born 1981)	Minister of Family and Social Policy (2016–2018)	AKP
Jülide Sarıeroğlu (born 1979)	Minister of Labour and Social Security (2017–2018)	AKP
Zehra Zümrüt Selçuk (born 1979)	Minister of Family, Labour and Social Services (2018–2021)	AKP (non MP)
Ruhsar Pekcan (born 1958)	Minister of Trade (2018–2021)	AKP (non MP)
Derya Yanık (born 1972)	Minister of Family and Social Services (2021–2023)	AKP (non MP)
Mahinur Özdemir Göktaş (born 1982)	Minister of Family and Social Services (2023-present)	Independent (non MP)

Distribution of female ministers by party in long term
1. AKP (35.7%)
2. Independent (25.0%)
3. DYP (10.7%)
4. SHP (10.7%)
5. ANAP (7.14%)
6. DSP (7.14%)
7. CHP (3.58%)

== Deputy Speakers of the Parliament ==
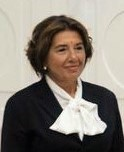
Ayşe Nur Bahçekapılı, Deputy Speaker of the Parliament of Turkey

Although no woman council president has served in the Grand National Assembly of Turkey until today, several politicians have served as the Deputy Speaker of the Parliament at different times. In 1972, the first female deputy president of the Republic of Turkey CGP parliamentary deputy has been Nermin Neftçi. Some of the other female deputy speakers were Meral Akşener (MHP), Güldal Mumcu (CHP) and finally Ayşe Nur Bahçekapılı (AK Party) for a long time.

== Party leaders ==
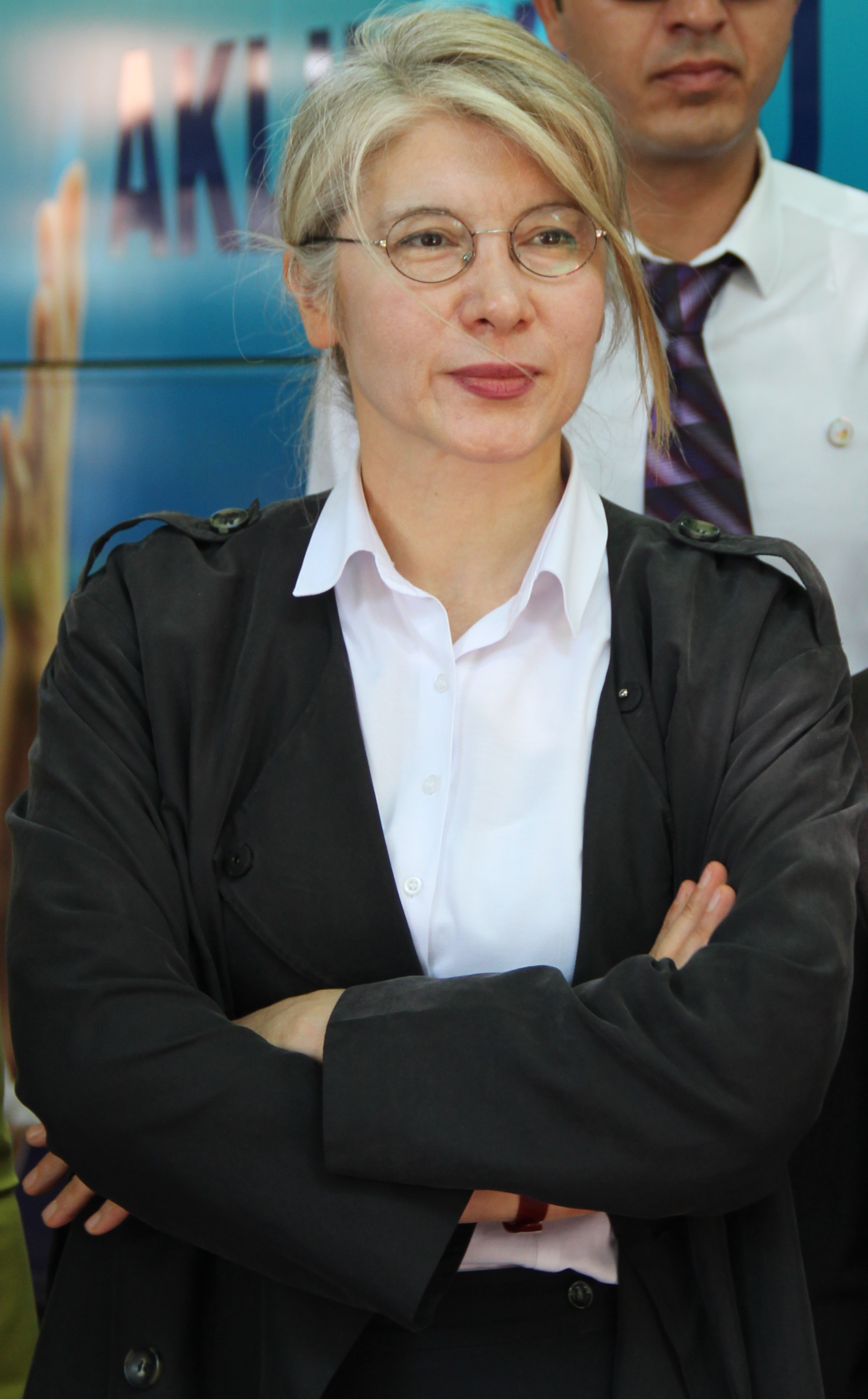
Emine Ülker Tarhan, former judge and leader of Anatolia Party

The first female Turkish party leader was Behice Boran (1910–1987). A member of the Workers Party of Turkey (TİP), she was elected as the chairwoman of the party in 1970 and continued in this post until all the political parties were closed following the September 11, 1980 military coup. Other female party leaders were:

- Mübeccel Göktuna (1915–1999) National Women's Party of Turkey (TUKP) (1972–1981)
- Rahşan Ecevit (1923–2020), Democratic Left Party (DSP) (1985–1987), Democratic Left People's Party (DSHP) (2010)
- Tansu Çiller (born 1946) True Path Party (DYP) (1993–2002), (Prime Minister from 1993 to 1996)
- Nesrin Nas (born 1958), Motherland Party (ANAP) (2003–2004)
- Filiz Koçali (born 1958), Socialist Democracy Party (2004–2009)
- Gültan Kışanak (born 1961), Peace and Democracy Party (BDP), (2011–2014)
- Sebahat Tuncel (born 1975) Peoples' Democratic Party (HDP) (2013–2014)
- Figen Yüksekdağ (born 1971), Peoples' Democratic Party (Turkey) (2014–2017) co-chair
- Emine Ülker Tarhan (born 1963), Anatolia Party (2014–2015) As of 2014, she is the founder and leader of the party.
- Fatma Benal Yazgan (born 1947), Women's Party (Turkey) (2014-present)
- Meral Akşener (born 1956), Good Party (2017–2024) co-founder and leader
- Serpil Kemalbay, Peoples' Democratic Party (2017–2018) co-chair
- Pervin Buldan (born 1967), Peoples' Democratic Party (2018–2023) co-chair

=== Women's parties ===
Two parties were founded by women: National Women's Party of Turkey in 1972 (up to 1980) and Women's Party (Turkey) in 2014

== Parliamentary Group Vice Chairwoman ==
According to the Turkish constitution, each party with over twenty seats forms a parliamentary group and each group is represented by 1–3 group vice chairpersons (Turkish: grup başkanvekili) who are authorized to represent, in general terms, the relevant party in the parliament both in relation to the parliament administration and in relations with other party groups, as well as presiding the parliamentary group in the absence of the party president. The first female group vice chairperson in Turkish parliament was Oya Araslı of the Republican People's Party between 1996 and 1999. Later, there were two parliamentary group chairwomen in parliament: Emine Ülker Tarhan of the Republican People's Party and Pervin Buldan of the Peace and Democracy Party.

== Members of Parliament ==
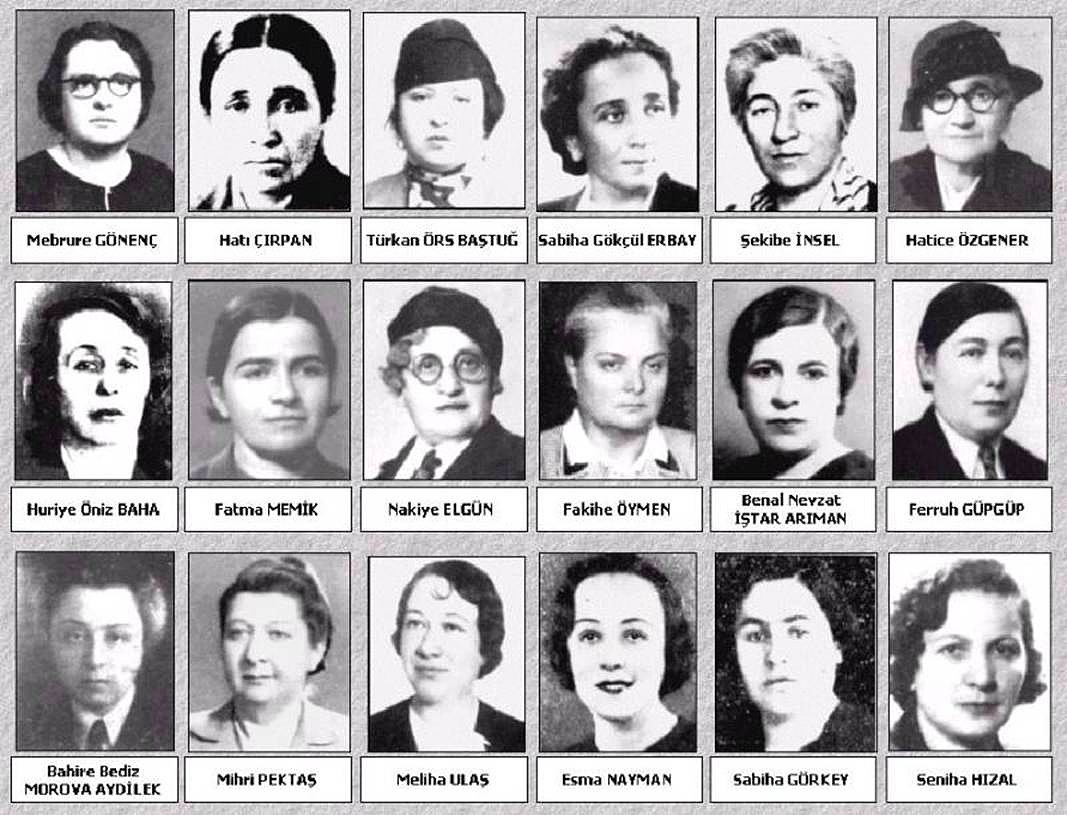
The first female MPs Republic of Turkey (1935). Top row (left to right): Mebrure Gönenç (Afyon), Hatı Çırpan (Ankara), Türkan Örs Baştuğ (Antalya), Sabiha Gökçül Erbay (Balıkesir), Şekibe İnsel (Bursa), Hatice Özgener (Çankırı) Middle row (left to right): Huriye Baha Öniz (Diyarbakır), Fatma Şakir Memik (Edirne), Nakiye Elgün (Erzurum), Fakihe Öymen (Ankara), Benal Nevzat İstar Arıman (İzmir), Ferruh Güpgüp (Kayseri) Bottom row (left to right): Bahire Bediş Morova Aydilek (Konya), Mihri Pektaş (Malatya), Meliha Ulaş (Samsun), Fatma Esma Nayman (Seyhan), Hatice Sabiha Görkey (Sivas), Seniha Nafız Hızal (Trabzon)

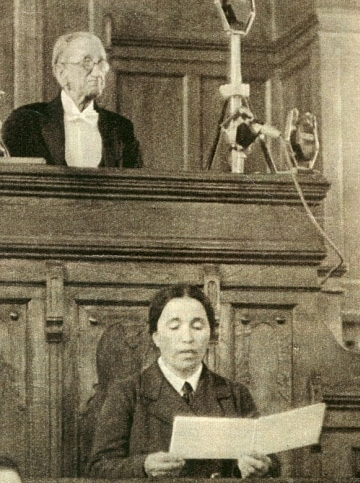
Ankara deputy Hatı Çırpan at the rostrum of the Parliament of Turkey, 1935

The first female MPs of the Turkish Parliament, elected with the 8 February 1935 general elections.

=== 1935–1999 elections ===
Following the promising 1935 start, however, the number of women in the parliament began to decrease. Especially in the 1950 and 1961 elections, only 3 women were able to enter the parliament, and since history has been given women the right to vote and be elected, it has been the least women entered into parliament.

Election year	Ratio of Women MP	Number of Women MP	Total Number of Deputies
1935	%4,6	18	395
1939	%3,7	15	429
1943	%3,7	16	435
1946	%1,9	9	465
1950	%0,6	3	487
1954	%0,7	4	541
1957	%1,3	8	610
1961	%0,7	3	450
1965	%1,8	8	450
1969	%1,1	5	450
1973	%1,3	6	450
1977	%0,9	4	450
1983	%3,0	12	399
1987	%1,3	6	450
1991	%1,8	8	450
1995	%2,4	13	550
1999	%4,2	22	550

=== 2002–present elections ===
Since 1995, the number of women in the parliament has been continually on the rise. The 1935 percentage of women, the first year that women were able to be elected to parliament, was surpassed no earlier than in 1999. However, the female representation rate did not fall below 10 percent after the 2011 elections.

Election year	Ratio of Women MP	Number of Women MP	Total Number of Deputies
2002	%4,4	24	550
2007	%9,1	50	550
2011	%14,3	79	550
2015; June	%17,6	97	550
2015; November	%14,7	81	550
2018	%17,1	103	600
2023	%20,1	121	600

=== Members of the Senate (1961–1980) ===
The Grand National Assembly of Turkey had a Senate (upper house) between 1961 and 1980. The following women were elected as the senators:

- Mebrure Aksoley (1902–1984), Republican People's Party (CHP) (1964–1973)
- Fatma Hikmet İşmen, (1918–2006), Workers Party of Turkey (TİP) (1966–1975)
- Bahriye Üçok (1919–1990), State President's contingency (1971–1976). The only assassinated female politician.
- Nermin Abadan Unat (1921–2025), State President's contingency (1978–1980)
- Aysel Baykal (1939–2003), Republican People's Party (CHP) (1979–1980)

== Governor ==
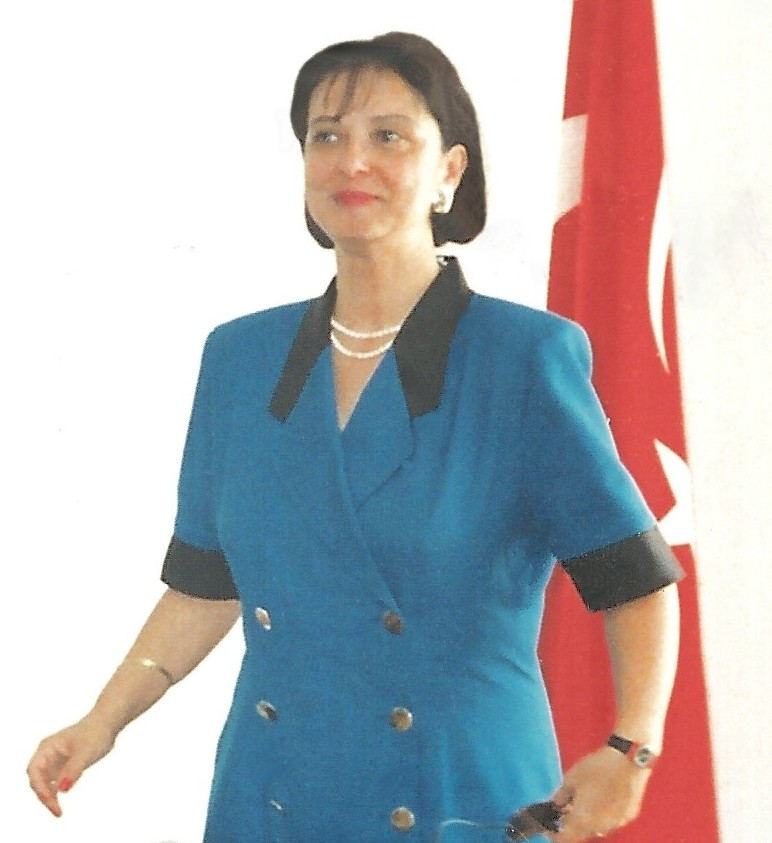
Lale Aytaman is first female Governor of Turkey, 1991

Turkey's first female governor was Lale Aytaman. Aytaman, who served as the governor of Muğla between 1991 and 1995, was appointed to this position by President Turgut Özal. Meanwhile, Turkey's first female district governor is Özlem Bozkurt Gevrek. She served in the Orta district of Çankırı in 1995. After these years, the number of female governors and district governors increased rapidly.

== Local governments ==
The first Turkish female mayor was Sadiye Hanım who was elected as the mayor of the town of Kılıçkaya in 1930. The first female muhtar (village head) in Turkey was Gülkız Ürbül, who became the muhtar of Demircidere village (now Karpuzlu) in the Çine district of Aydın Province in 1933. In the elections, she ran against seven male candidates. The first female major city mayor was Müfide İlhan, who was elected as the mayor of Mersin in 1950.

== See also ==
- Politics of Turkey
- Turkish order of precedence
- Women in Turkey
- Timeline of first women's suffrage in majority-Muslim countries
