= 1935 Turkish general election =

- 8 February 1935

All 399 seats in the Grand National Assembly 200 seats needed for a majority
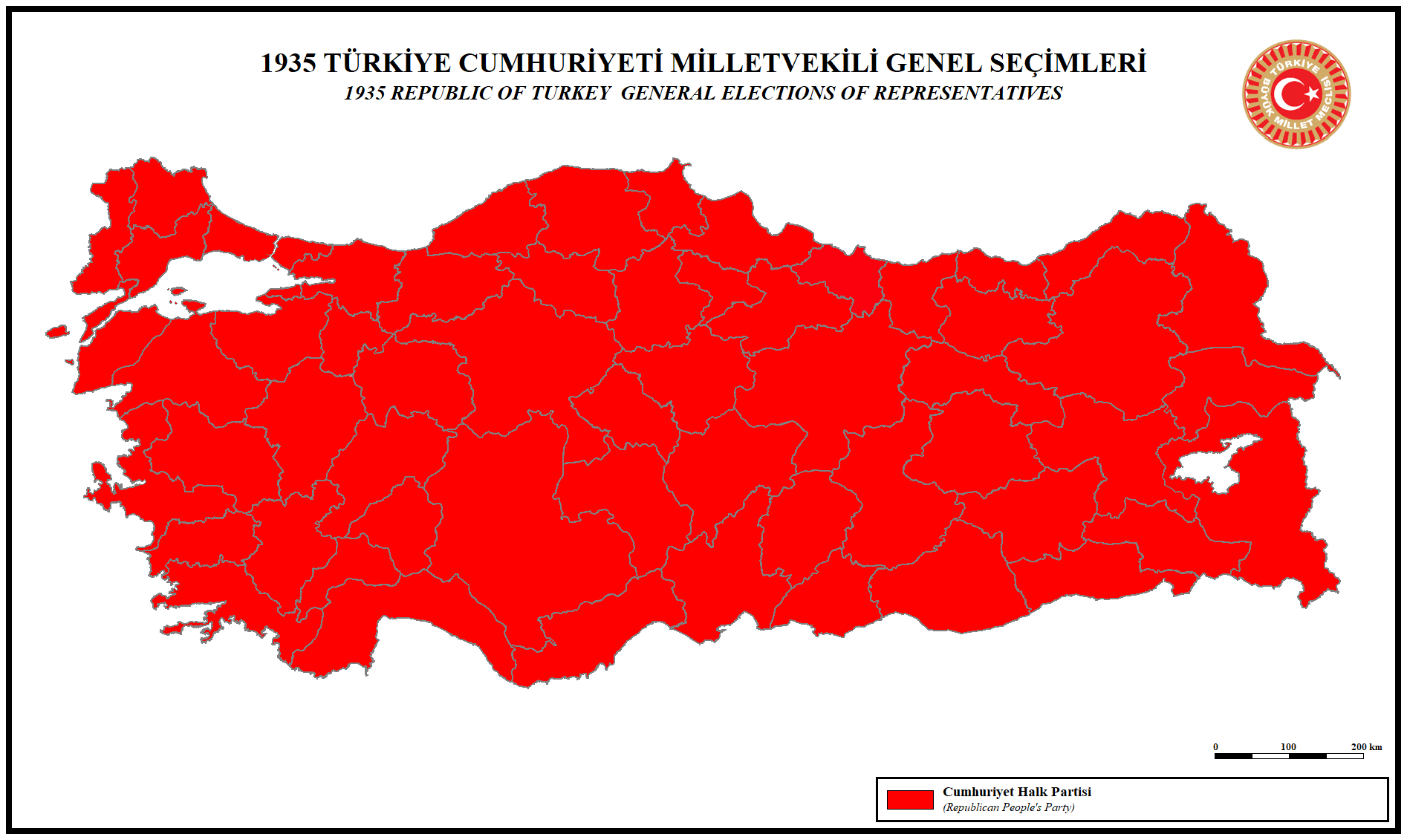
Prime Minister before election
İsmet İnönü
CHP
Elected Prime Minister
İsmet İnönü
CHP

General elections were held in Turkey on 8 February 1935. The Republican People's Party was the only party in the country at the time.

== Electoral system ==
The elections were held under the Ottoman electoral law passed in 1908, which provided for a two-stage process. In the first stage, voters elected secondary electors (one for the first 750 voters in a constituency, then one for every additional 500 voters). In the second stage the secondary electors elected the members of the Turkish Grand National Assembly.

Following a change in the law in 1934, women were granted the right to vote and run for election, and the age of voting was raised from 18 to 22.

== Results ==
Seventeen of the 399 elected members were women, with Bahire Bediş Morova Aydilek, Mihri Bektaş, Hatı Çırpan, Nakiye Elgün, Sabiha Gökçül Erbay, Mebrure Gönenç, Hatice Sabiha Görkey, Ferruh Güpgüp, Seniha Nafız Hızal, Ayşe Şekibe İnsel, Benal Nevzat İstar Arıman, Fatma Şakir Memik, Fatma Esma Nayman, Huriye Baha Öniz, Türkan Örs Baştuğ, Fakihe Öymen and Meliha Ulaş becoming the first women to hold seats in parliament.

== See also ==
- Women in Turkish politics
