= Sabiha Gökçül Erbay =

Turkish school teacher and politician

Ayşe Sabiha Gökçül Erbay
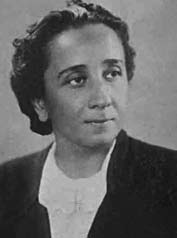
- Ayşe Sabiha Gökçül (1939)

Deputy of Balıkesir
- In office February 9, 1935 – March 26, 1939

Deputy of Samsun
- In office August 11, 1941 – July 21, 1946

Personal details
- Born: Ayşe Sabiha; 1900 Bergama, Balıkesir, Ottoman Empire
- Died: August 31, 1998 (aged 97–98)
- Party: Republican People's Party (CHP)
- Education: Teaching
- Alma mater: Teacher's College
- Occupation: School teacher, politician
- Known for: One of the first 18 female Turkish members of the parliament, the first female member of the parliament's presidium

Ayşe Sabiha Gökçül Erbay (1900 – August 31, 1998) was a Turkish school teacher, politician and one of the first 18 female members of the Turkish parliament.

== Private life ==
Ayşe Sabiha was born to Aziz and his spouse Nadire in Bergama, Balıkesir, then Ottoman Empire in 1900. She was educated at the Teacher's College. She then attended the Teacher's Higher College, and graduated in 1919.

After the enactment of 1934 Surname Law, she took the family name "Gökçül". Ayşe Sabiha Gökçül married to Mustafa Ulvi Erbay in 1943.

== School teacher career ==
On September 19, 1919, her teaching career began with her appointment to the Teacher's School for Girls in Edirne as a teacher for Turkish language. Her employment ended on June 21, 1920, when the Ottoman Empire was about to go to an end.

After three years of unemployment, and with the establishment of the Republic of Turkey, she returned to her career, appointed on October 22, 1923 to the Teacher's School for Girls in İzmir as a teacher for Turkish language. Between February and October 1924, she served at the Girls' High School in İzmir as a teacher of pedagogy, and at the same she had duties of a deputy principal. She was then appointed principal of the Teachers' School for Girls in Adana, where she also taught Turkish literature. In September 1925, she returned to her former workplace, the Teacher's School for Girls in İzmir, where she served as a teacher of Turkish language until May 1927, and then of Turkish literature to February 1935, when she resigned to enter politics.

== Politician career ==
According to the Law of Suffrage enacted in 1934, Turkish women were granted to vote and run for a seat in the parliament. She was nominated by the Republican People's Party (CHP) for the 1935 general election held on February 8. She entered the 5th Parliament as a deputy of Balıkesir. She became so one of the first 18 female members of the Turkish parliament. She was elected secretary of the parliament's presidium for the first year of the parliamentary session. She became so also the first female member of the parliament's presidium. In the following three years of her term, she served in the parliamentary committee for customs and monopoly.

In a report about her electoral district she prepared with other deputies of Balıkesir for the parliament in 1935, it was noted that a teacher was needed to be allocated to Ayvalık, Balıkesir Province in order to raise the cultural level of the immigrants settled there, reducing the oil prices would be very beneficial for the farmers and the land reforms have to be expedited for the villagers without agricultural land.

In the 1939 general election held on March 26, she was not able to keep her seat in the parliament as a deputy of Balıkesir. She returned to her profession as a teacher. She served as a teacher of Turkish literature at Erenköy Girls High School in Istanbul between June 1939 and August 1941.

In the intermediate general election of 1941, she gained a seat in the 6th Parliament as a deputy of Samsun. She continued with her membership in the 7th Parliament as a deputy of Samsun following the 1943 general election held on February 28.

She returned to the teaching career after the 1946 general election held on June 21.

== Later years ==
After leaving politics, Sabiha Gökçül Erbay resumed her profession as school teacher. She served at Gazi High School in Ankara as a teacher of Turkish literature between February 1947 and October 1948 befure she retired.

Sabiha Gökçül Erbay died on August 31, 1998.
