= Seniha Nafız Hızal =

Turkish politician

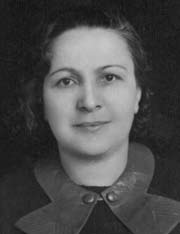
- Seniha Hızal (1935)

Deputy of Trabzon
- In office 8 February 1935 – 3 April 1939

Personal details
- Born: Seniha Nafız; 1897 Adapazarı, Ottoman Empire
- Died: 22 June 1985 (aged 87–88)
- Party: Republican People's Party (CHP)
- Education: Darülfünun
- Occupation: Politician
- Known for: One of the first 18 female Turkish members of the parliament

Seniha Nafız Hızal (1897 – 22 June 1985) was a Turkish school teacher and politician. She was one of the first 18 female members of the Turkish parliament.

== Private life ==
Seniha Nafız was born to Nafız and his wife Hüsniye in Adapazarı, then the Ottoman Empire, in 1897. After completing her primary education at Fatih Junior High School (Ottoman Turkish: Rüştiye), she entered the Vocational School for Girls. She then studied at the Higher Teachers College (Dârülmuallimât) between 14 October 1916, and 15 September 1917. In 1918, she graduated from the Faculty of Science at Darülfünun, which today is Istanbul University, as one of the first female graduates.

She adopted the surname "Hızal" following the enactment of 1934 Surname Law. She never married. Hızal died on 22 June 1985.

== School teacher career ==
She began a teacher's career in Biology. Between 6 December 1917 and 20 November 1918, she worked in the Directorate of the Teachers College. On 26 March 1919, she was appointed teacher for Biology at Erenköy Girls High School (Ottoman Turkish: Erenköy İnâs Sultanisi). She was appointed to the Board of Inspectors at the Educational General Inspectors Administration on 22 March 1922. She also became the first female educational inspector in Turkey. On 27 February 1923, she was appointed teacher of children's education and vice principal at Kandilli Girls Junior High School. Her next appointments were vice principal of the Istanbul Girls Teachers School on 8 November 1923, and principal of the Girls Teachers School in Bursa on 15 September 1924. On 27 October 1925, she returned to Istanbul Girls Teachers School as vice principal. She became an inspector general for the Istanbul Area on 12 December 1926. She served at the Istanbul Selçuk Hatun Vocational Girls School as a teacher for Turkish Literature from 15 October 1928, for Didactic, Physics and Chemistry from 1 September 1929, for Biology from 6 December 1930.

In 1931, she established a private school "Yeni Türkiye" ("New Turkey") in Şişli, Istanbul, and served as its principal until she entered a politician's career.

== Politician career ==
Seniha Hızal was nominated as a member of the parliament by the Republican People's Party (CHP). She entered the 5th parliament as a deputy of Trabzon following the 1935 general election held on 8 February. She became so one of the first 18 female members of the Turkish parliament.

During the four-year parliamentary term, she was part of the Committee for Education, and served also in other temporary committees. On 13 June 1936, she attended the Congress of the Society for the Protection of Children, and was elected member of the Central Board of the institution.

Her political career ended on 3 April 1939, until the 1939 general election.

== Return to her profession ==
After leaving politics, she returned to her profession, and was appointed educational inspector on 27 July 1939. She served at this post until 1949. She was then appointed teacher for Biology at the Istanbul Beyoğlu Girls High School. The school's name was changed to İstanbul Atatürk Girls High School on 20 January 1953. She finally retired on 3 October 1954.

== See also ==
- Women in Turkish politics
