= Fatma Şakir Memik =

Turkish female physician and politician

Dr. Fatma Şakir Memik
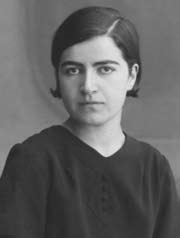
- Fatma Şakir Memik (1935)

Deputy of Edirne
- In office February 8, 1935 – August 5, 1946

Personal details
- Born: Fatma Şakir; 1903 Akviran village, Safranbolu, Ottoman Empire
- Died: February 9, 1991 (aged 87–88)
- Party: Republican People's Party (CHP)
- Education: Medicine
- Alma mater: Darülfünun
- Occupation: Politician
- Profession: Physician
- Known for: One of the first 18 female Turkish members of the parliament

Fatma Şakir Memik (1903 – February 9, 1991) was a Turkish physician, politician and one of the first 18 female members of the Turkish parliament. Memik was a philanthropist.

== Early life ==
Fatma Şakir was born to Şakir, a baker and flour trader, and his spouse Cemile in Akviran village of Safranbolu, Ottoman Empire in 1903.

She was schooled in her hometown. At the age of eight, she moved with her father to Istanbul, where she attended Bayezid girls' school and Bezmiâlem Valide Sultan School. After finishing the high school in 1923, she was educated in medicine at Darülfünun, today Istanbul University. In 1929, she graduated ranking first in class. Between 1929 and 1931, she conducted her medical specialization at Vakıf Gureba Hospital, today School of Medicine Hospital of Bezmialem Foundation University.

== Physician ==
Fatma Şakir served as an assistant physician at Heybeliada Sanatorium from January 31 to October 6, 1932. She was then assigned to Vakıf Gureba Hospital serving between October 9, 1932, and June 1, 1933. She became a specialist doctor for Internal medicine after receiving the Board certification in 1934. The next year, she was appointed clinic chief at the same hospital.

== Politician ==
Inline with the law of suffrage enacted in 1934, Turkish women were granted to vote and run for a seat in the parliament. She learned by chance that the Republican People's Party (CHP) nominated her for the 1935 general election. It was revealed that President Mustafa Kemal Atatürk personally wanted Memik's nomination due to her profession as a physician. She entered the 5th Parliament as a deputy from Edirne Province. She was so one of the first 18 female members of the Turkish parliament.

She was elected temporary secretary of the parliament's presidium in its first session. During her term, Memik served as secretary in the parliamentary commission of Health and Social Welfare. In addition, she was a member of the commissions formed for the bills to Labor Law and Sports Organizations. In a report for the parliament, she prepared with other deputies of Edirne Province, it was recommended that immigrants should be settled in empty areas to promote production, the Chemins de fer Orientaux (transl. Oriental Railway) should be nationalized, a leveee needs to be constructed to regulate the flooding River Maritsa and the swamps causing malaria in the region should be urgently drained. She took part at the International Congress on Child Welfare held in Belgrade, Kingdom of Yugoslavia on October 1, 1938. Memik kept her seat in the 6th and 7th Parliament.

== Philanthropist ==
From 1931 on, she served as a physician for the almshouse in Topkapı, Istanbul honorarily in her free time while she was a board member of the charity institution n the same time.

During her membership in the parliament in Ankara, she traveled by train to Istanbul on Friday evenings. On Saturdays, she gratuitously served in a private polyclinic in Çarşıkapı, Istanbul. In the Saturday evenings and Sundays, she was available for heath service to her neighbors.

Memik was nicknamed in İstanbul the "Doctor, who practice for free" or the "Mother of poor people".

She was a board member at "Turkish Children Welfare Corporation" (Turkish: Çocuk Esirgeme Kurumu), "Turkish Red Crescent" (Turkish: Kızılay).

== Later years ==
She returned to her principal profession after she left politics in 1946. Between 1947 and 1949, she worked as an internist at Ankara Numune Hospital, and from 1950 to 1951 in the dispensary of the health insurance of workers in Beşiktaş, Istanbul. In 1951, Memik was appointed chief of polyclinic at Şişli Children's Hospital in 1951. She served at this position until her retirement in 1968.

Fatma Şakir Memik died on February 9, 1991. She was not married.
