= Hatice Sabiha Görkey =

Turkish politician (1888–1963)

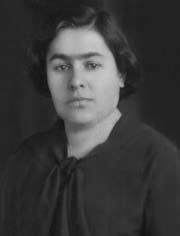
- Görkey (1935)

Deputy of Sivas
- In office 9 February 1935 – 26 March 1939

Personal details
- Born: Hatice Sabiha; 1888 Üsküdar, Istanbul, Ottoman Empire
- Died: 22 November 1963 (aged 74–75)
- Party: Republican People's Party (CHP)
- Education: Teacher education
- Alma mater: Istanbul Teacher's College, Istanbul University
- Occupation: Politician
- Profession: Headteacher and Mathematics teacher of Girls' Secondary School And First Female Mathematician Graduated from Turkish/ Ottoman University
- Known for: One of the first 18 female Turkish members of the parliament

Hatice Sabiha Görkey (1888 – 22 November 1963) was a Turkish headteacher and mathematics teacher at girls' secondary school; first female mathematician graduated from Turkish/Ottoman University; politician and one of the first 18 female members of the Turkish parliament.

== Early life ==
Hatice Sabiha was born to Hajji Ismail and his spouse Ayşe in Üsküdar, Istanbul, then Ottoman Empire in 1888. Her mother cared for the education of the children by working as a teacher for tailoring after her father died at her childhood. She finished Üsküdar Vocational High School for Girls in 1903 and graduated from Istanbul Dârülmuallimât (Teacher's College of Istanbul) in 1906.

== School teacher career ==
On 31 January 1907, she went out to work serving as a schoolteacher for embroidery at Molla Gürani Vocational Junior High School. She was then appointed to Üsküdar Vocational High School for Girls (March 1908), to Kadıköy Normal Junior High School (October 1911), again to Üsküdar Vocational Junior High School (January 1912), to Açık Türbe Vocational High School (January 1914) and to Mal Hatun Vocational High School (October 1914). During the time she earned her life, she studied mathematics in Darülfünun, the former Istanbul University, graduating with the highest mark in 1917. She was one of the first five graduating female students at the university. In September 1917, she was appointed to Teacher's College in Bursa as the assistant principal and teacher of mathematics. She was deemed resigned after she went to Istanbul on her vacation and did not return to her duty. In February 1919, she was appointed to Teacher's College for Girls in Edirne as the assistant principal and mathematics teacher. She retained these positions until September 1922.

During her time in Edirne, she married high school principal Kemal Görkey. From this marriage, a child was born.

During the final years of the Ottoman Empire, she became unemployed between October 1922 and September 1923. She served briefly in 1923 as a mathematics teacher at Teacher's College for Girls in Adana. From October 1923, the establishment of the Republic of Turkey, to August 1933, she was mathematics teacher at Teacher's College for Girls in Sivas, and then until February 1935 at a junior high school in Tokat.

== Politician career ==
According to the law of suffrage enacted in 1934, Turkish women were granted to vote and run for a seat in the parliament. Görkey entered politics for the Republican People's Party (CHP) and was nominated for the 1935 general election. She was elected to the 5th Parliament as a deputy of Sivas. She became one of the first 18 female members of the parliament. She served in the parliamentary committee for the interior during the four-year term. Following the 1939 general election, she retired voluntarily.

Görkey died on 22 November 1963.
