= Mebrure Gönenç =

Turkish politician

Emine Mebrure Gönenç
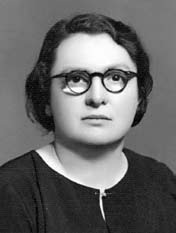
- Emine Mebrure Gönenç (1935)

Deputy of Afyonkarahisar
- In office 9 February 1935 – 20 July 1946

Personal details
- Born: Emine Mebrure; 1900 Istanbul, Ottoman Empire
- Died: 6 December 1981 (aged 80–81)
- Party: Republican People's Party (CHP)
- Education: Arnavutköy American High School for Girls
- Occupation: Teacher, politician
- Known for: One of the first 18 female Turkish members of the parliament

Emine Mebrure Gönenç (1900 – 6 December 1981) was a Turkish school teacher, politician and one of the first 18 female members of the Turkish parliament.

== Early life ==
Mebrure Gönenç was born in 1900 to İbrahim, a clerk in the office for personal private expenditures of Ottoman Sultan Abdul Hamid II (reigned 1876–1909), and his spouse Didar in Istanbul, then Ottoman Empire. According to an unofficial information of the family', she was born in 1898. She finished her primary education at Üsküdar Vocational High School for Girls, and then attended "Ottoman Union School" in Beşiktaş, which educated in Turkish and French. In 1914, she entered Arnavutköy American High School for Girls graduating in 1919.

== School teacher career ==
Emine Mebrure began a career serving as a teacher of French at Girls' School in Beylerbeyi. She then taught English and Science at American School in Gedikpaşa. Between 1925 and 1926, shortly after the establishment of the Republic of Turkey, she accompanied a traveling exhibition for the promotion of goods made in Turkey on a journey aboard SS Kardeniz, which extended up to Scandinavia.

In 1927, she married physician Ahmet Remzi, who was a resident of Adana in southern Turkey. She followed her spouse to Adana, and settled there. From this marriage, two children were born.

== Politician career ==
In 1930, she was elected as one of the first female members into the municipal council of Adana. She later became a member of the Municipal council of Mersin.

According to the law of suffrage enacted in 1934, Turkish women were granted to vote and run for a seat in the parliament. She assumed the surname "Gönenç" after the enactment of the 1934 Surname Law. She was nominated by the Republican People's Party (CHP) for the 1935 general election. She was elected into the 5th Parliament as a deputy of Afyonkarahisar. She became so one of the first 18 female members of the parliament. Gönenç took part at the 12th International Congress of Women held in Istanbul between 18 and 26 April 1935. She kept her seat in the following 6th and 7th Parliament until the 1946 general election held on 21 July.

In a report about her electoral district she prepared for the parliament in 1935, Gönenç emphasized the importance of the enlightenment of the villagers and the fight against alcoholism. She added that the women were socially not sufficient active, the high schools lack teachers and the thermal springs in the area need to be developed and opened for tourism. She served in the parliamentary committee for public works during her term.

== Social responsibility ==
In 1949, Gönenç became chairperson of the Association for the Blind and its School for the Blind, which was an institution affiliated with the Ministry of Health. She played an important role in the adoption of the Braille alphabet in Turkey as she was also visually impaired in a high grade.

Gönenç died on 6 December 1981 from cardiac insufficiency.
