= List of Turkish politicians =

This is a list of notable politicians in the Republic of Turkey.

Contents: A B C Ç D E F G H I İ J K L M N O Ö P R S Ş T U Ü V Y Z

== A ==
- Meral Akşener - vice speaker of parliament, leader of İyi Party
- Yıldırım Akbulut - prime minister
- İsmail Rüştü Aksal - CHP secretary general
- Ekrem Alican- YTP leader
- Oya Araslı- politician (CHP)
- Hamdi Apaydın - First term MP
- Saffet Arıkan - Government minister
- Mustafa Kemal Atatürk - Founder and first President of the Turkish Republic
- Mehmet Ali Aybar - leader of TİP

== B ==
- Ali Babacan – vice prime minister
- Devlet Bahçeli - leader of MHP - vice prime minister
- Cemil Sait Barlas - Government minister
- Faik Ahmet Barutçu - Government minister
- Celal Bayar - president - leader of DP
- Deniz Baykal – leader CHP
- Hikmet Bayur - Government minister
- Behice Boran - leader of TİP
- Ferruh Bozbeyli - Parliament speaker
- Mahmut Esat Bozkurt - Government minister
- Osman Bölükbaşı -leader of MP

== C ==
- Necdet Calp -leader of HP
- İsmail Cem - leader of YTP, foreign minister

== Ç ==
- İhsan Sabri Çağlayangil - senate chairman, acting president
- Fevzi Çakmak – leader of MP
- Mevlüt Çavuşoğlu - foreign minister
- Hikmet Çetin - leader of CHP
- Vasıf Çınar - Government minister
- Hatı Çırpan - first female villager parliament member
- Tansu Çiller - leader of DYP, female prime minister

== D ==
- Süleyman Demirel - leader of AP, leader of DYP, prime minister, president
- Ali Dinçer - mayor of Ankara, deputy chairman of the assembly

== E ==
- Bülent Ecevit - leader of DSP, prime minister
- Rahşan Ecevit -leader of DSP
- Necmettin Erbakan, prime minister
- Recep Tayyip Erdoğan - leader of AK Party, prime minister, president
- Nihat Erim - prime minister
- Kenan Evren - president

== F ==
- Turhan Feyzioğlu- leader of CGP

== G ==
- Reşit Galip - Minister of National Education
- Mübeccel Göktuna -leader of the first women's party
- Şemsettin Günaltay-prime minister
- Abdullah Gül - prime minister, president
- Kasım Gülek -secretary general of CHP
- Birgül Ayman Güler- vice president of CHP
- Cemal Gürsel- president and prime minister
- Gencay Gürün - MP, dramatist, diplomat
- Kemal Güven - parliament speaker
- Aydın Güven Gürkan - leader of HP, SHP

== I ==
- Sadi Irmak - prime minister

== İ ==
- Tevfik İleri - Government minister
- Müfide İlhan - first female mayor (Mersin)
- Erdal İnönü – leader of SODEP, SHP, vice prime minister
- İsmet İnönü - leader of CHP, prime minister, president

== K ==
- Atilla Karaosmanoğlu
- Murat Karayalçın -leader of SHP
- Cahit Karakaş - Parliament speaker
- Cezmi Kartay - leader of SODEP
- Kemal Kılıçdaroğlu - leader of CHP
- Refik Koraltan - chairman of the parliament
- Fahri Korutürk - president
- Numan Kurtulmuş - deputy prime minister, parliament speaker
- Sadık Kutlay - minister of settlement

== M ==
- Ferit Melen - prime minister
- Adnan Menderes - prime minister
- Hüseyin Numan Menemencioğlu -Government minister
- Güldal Mumcu - Parliament vice speaker
- Mustafa Hamarat - AK Party Deputy General Secretary

== N ==
- Mustafa Necati (Uğural) - Three times government minister
- Fatma Esma Nayman - one of the earliest female MPs

== O ==
- Ali Fethi Okyar - prime minister
- Rauf Orbay - chairman of the government - opposition leader (in early parliament)

== Ö ==
- Huriye Öniz - one of the first female MPs
- Turgut Özal - leader of ANAP; prime minister, president
- Fahrettin Özdilek - vice prime minister
- Altan Öymen - leader of CHP
- Özgür Özel - leader of CHP

== P ==
- Recep Peker - prime minister

== S ==
- Hasan Saka - prime minister
- Şükrü Saracoğlu- prime minister
- Kemal Satır -secretary general of CHP
- Refik Saydam- prime minister
- Gün Sazak - government minister
- Nur Serter - CHP MP
- Ahmet Necdet Sezer - president
- Zeki Sezer - leader of DSP
- Fuat Sirmen -Parliament speaker
- Cevdet Sunay - president
- Faruk Sükan - Government minister

== Ş ==
- Mustafa Şentop - Parliament speaker

== T ==
- Naim Talu - prime minister
- Ali Rana Tarhan - Government minister
- Emine Ülker Tarhan - group chair women of CHP
- Yusuf Kemal Tengirşenk - Government minister
- Alparslan Türkeş – leader of MHP
- Ahmet Fikri Tüzer - acting prime minister

== U ==
- Necdet Uğur - Government minister
- Bülent Ulusu - prime minister
- Hilmi Uran - Government minister
- Behçet Uz - Government minister

== Ü ==
- Gülkız Ürbül - first female villagehead
- Suat Hayri Ürgüplü - prime minister
- Mustafa Üstündağ - Government minister
- Besim Üstünel -Government minister

== Y ==
- Binali Yıldırım - prime minister
- Dilek Akagün Yılmaz - CHP MP
- Mesut Yılmaz - leader of ANAP, prime minister
- Lebit Yurdoğlu - minister of Settlement

== Turkish politicians serving in other countries ==
- Lale Akgün - German politician
- Nebahat Albayrak - Dutch politician
- Osman "Oz" Bengür, Maryland Democratic Party Congressional Candidate
- Sevim Dağdelen - German politician
- Ekin Deligöz - German politician
- Rauf Denktaş - Politician, Former President of the Turkish Republic of Northern Cyprus
- Ahmed Djemal - Politician, Member of the Young Turks
- Ahmed Doğan - Human rights activist and politician, leader of Movement for Rights and Freedoms.
- Fatma Ekenoğlu - Politician
- John Eren, politician brother of Tayfun Eren.
- Tayfun Eren, Politician, He was the first person of Turkish birth to be elected to a Parliament in Australia
- Hakkı Keskin - German politician
- Fazıl Küçük - Politician, Vice President of Cyprus
- Vural Öger - German politician
- Cem Özdemir - German Politician
- Ferdi Sabit Soyer – Politician
- Mehmet Ali Talat - Politician, President of the Turkish Republic of Northern Cyprus
- Zeki Velidi Togan - Politician, Historian
- Emel Etem Toshkova - Bulgarian politician, Deputy Prime Minister of Bulgaria (current)
- Ziya Gökalp - Politician, Poet
- Fatin Rüştü Zorlu - Politician, Diplomat, Minister of Foreign Affairs of Turkey
