= Özgener =

Özgener is a Turkish surname. Notable people with the surname include:

- Hatice Özgener (1865–1940), Turkish politician
- Mahmut Özgener (born 1963), Turkish football executive
