= Street signs of Istanbul =

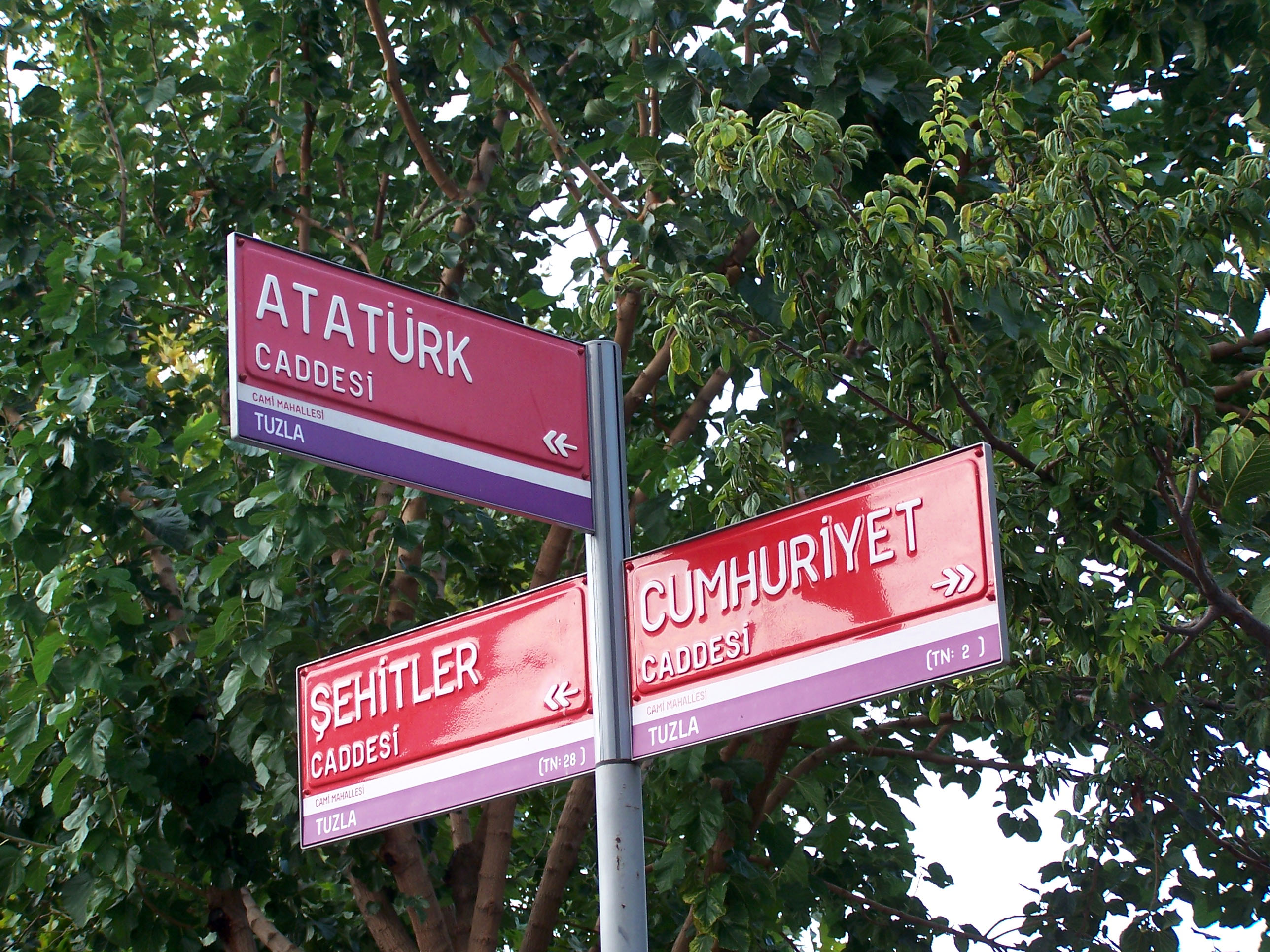
Direction signs for Atatürk, Şehitler and Cumhuriyet streets in Tuzla

The street signs of Istanbul are signs designed by Aykut Köksal and Bülent Erkmen as part of a project initiated by the Istanbul Metropolitan Municipality in 2007. These signs were first introduced at the "Reading Istanbul from Its Street Signs" exhibition, held on June 26, 2007, at the Garanti Gallery.

== History ==
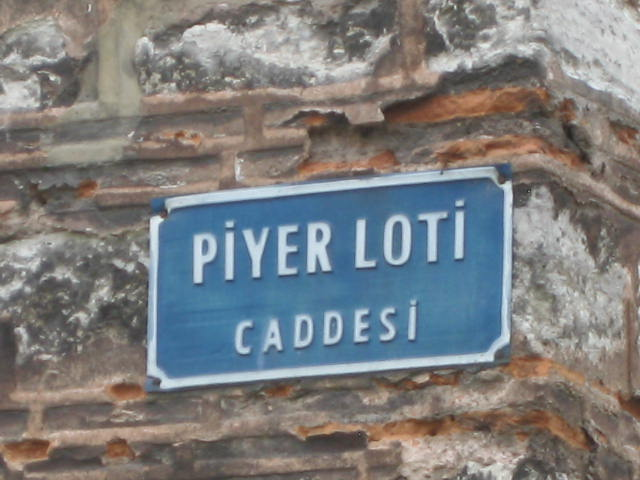
Old-style street sign of Pierre Loti Street

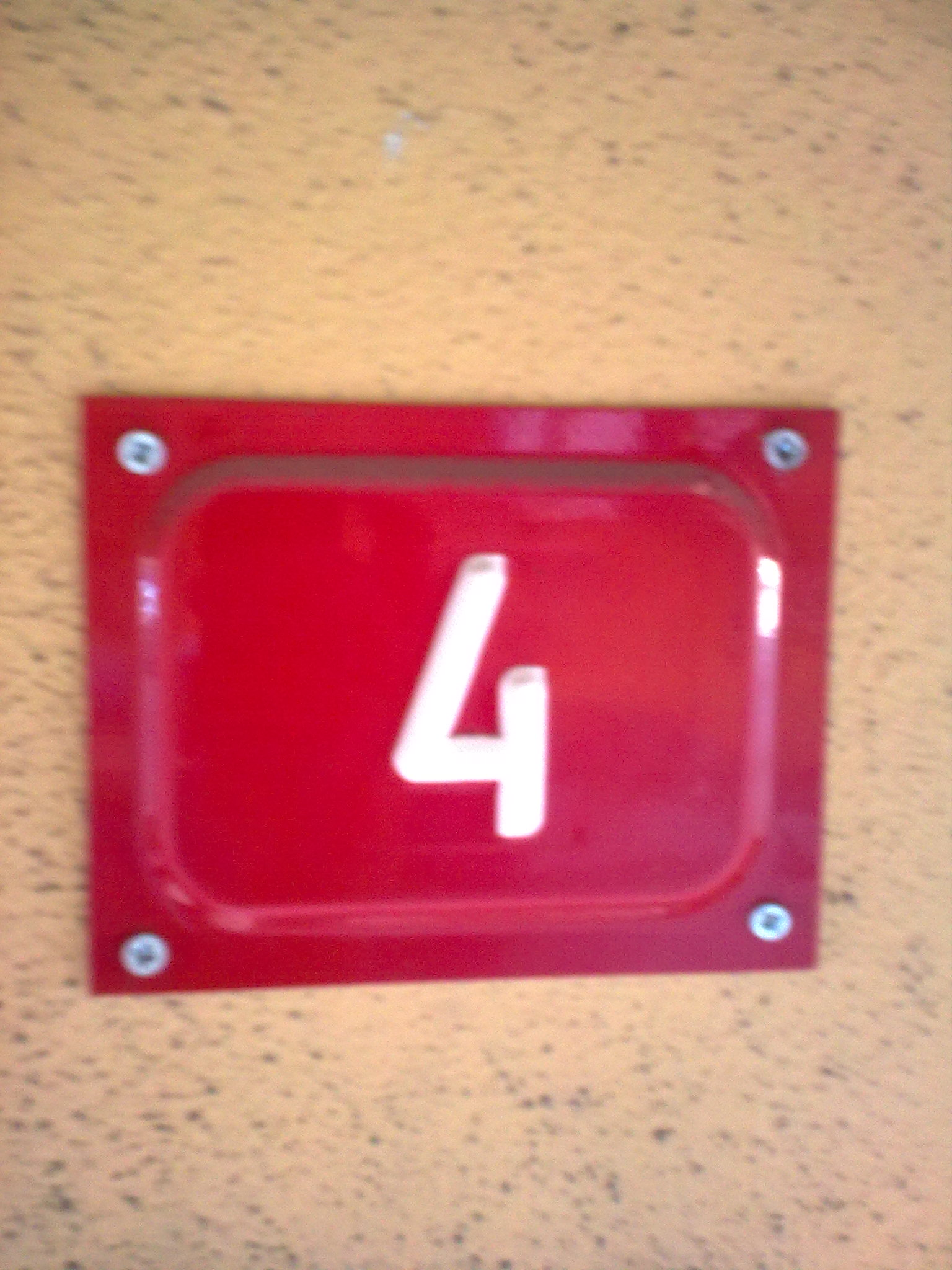
Door number with the same design used in Istanbul street signs

Prior to the standardization established in 2007, Istanbul had street signs and door numbers in various designs, predominantly in blue. However, as part of a project organized by the Istanbul Metropolitan Municipality in 2007, a standard was introduced for street signs. The new signs, designed by Aykut Köksal and Bülent Erkmen, feature a background color designated as Pantone 1945. The color of the lower strip, which displays the district names, varies depending on the district. To prevent confusion between neighboring districts, distinct colors have been assigned to more distant districts. The font used for the street signs is "Kent", specifically designed by Yetkin Başarır for this project.

=== Place in popular culture ===
In Istanbul, many gift shops sell signboards with similar designs, featuring the names of neighborhoods in the same style as the city's official street signs.

== Gallery ==
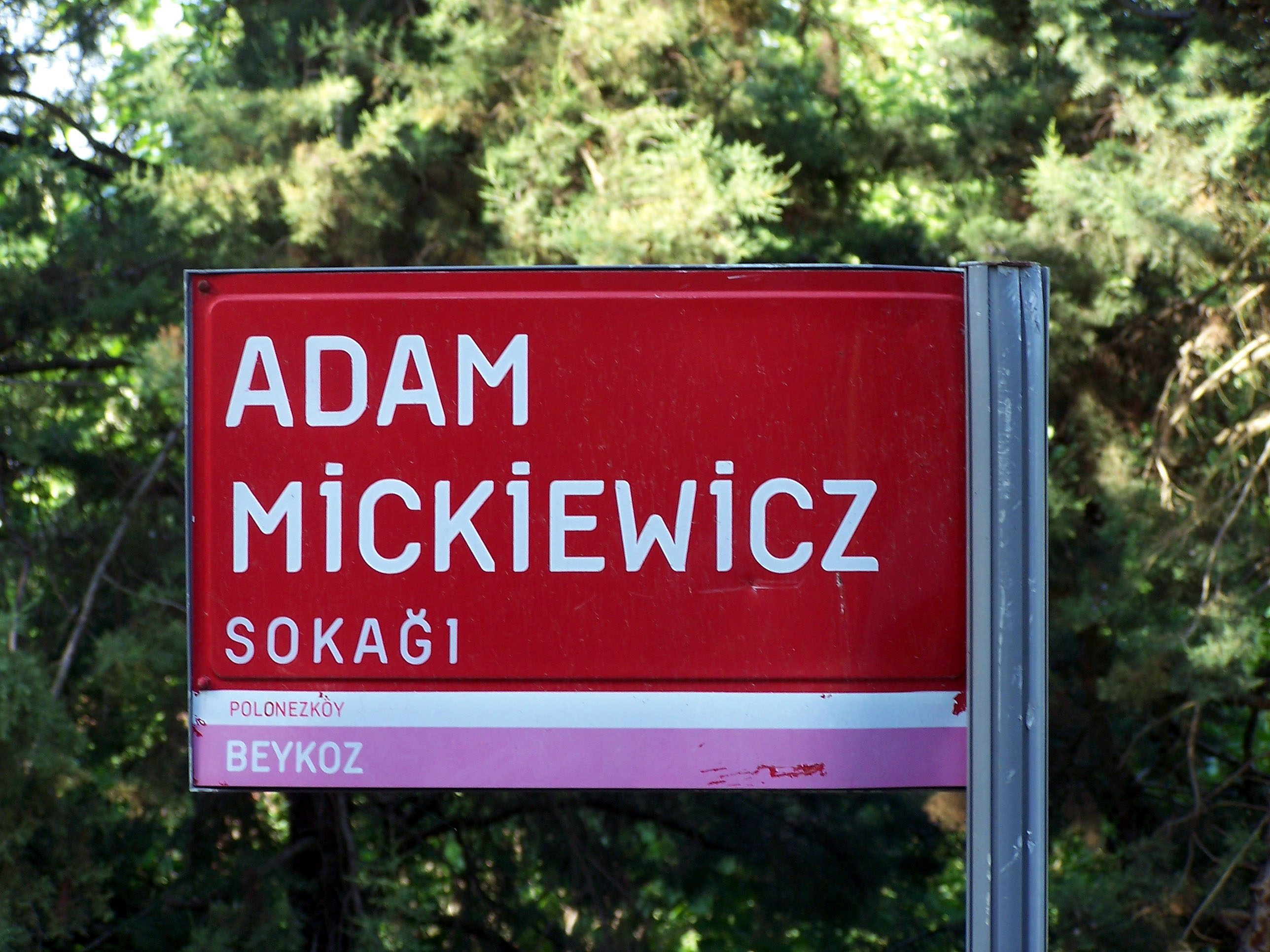
Street sign of Adam Mickiewicz Street in Beykoz

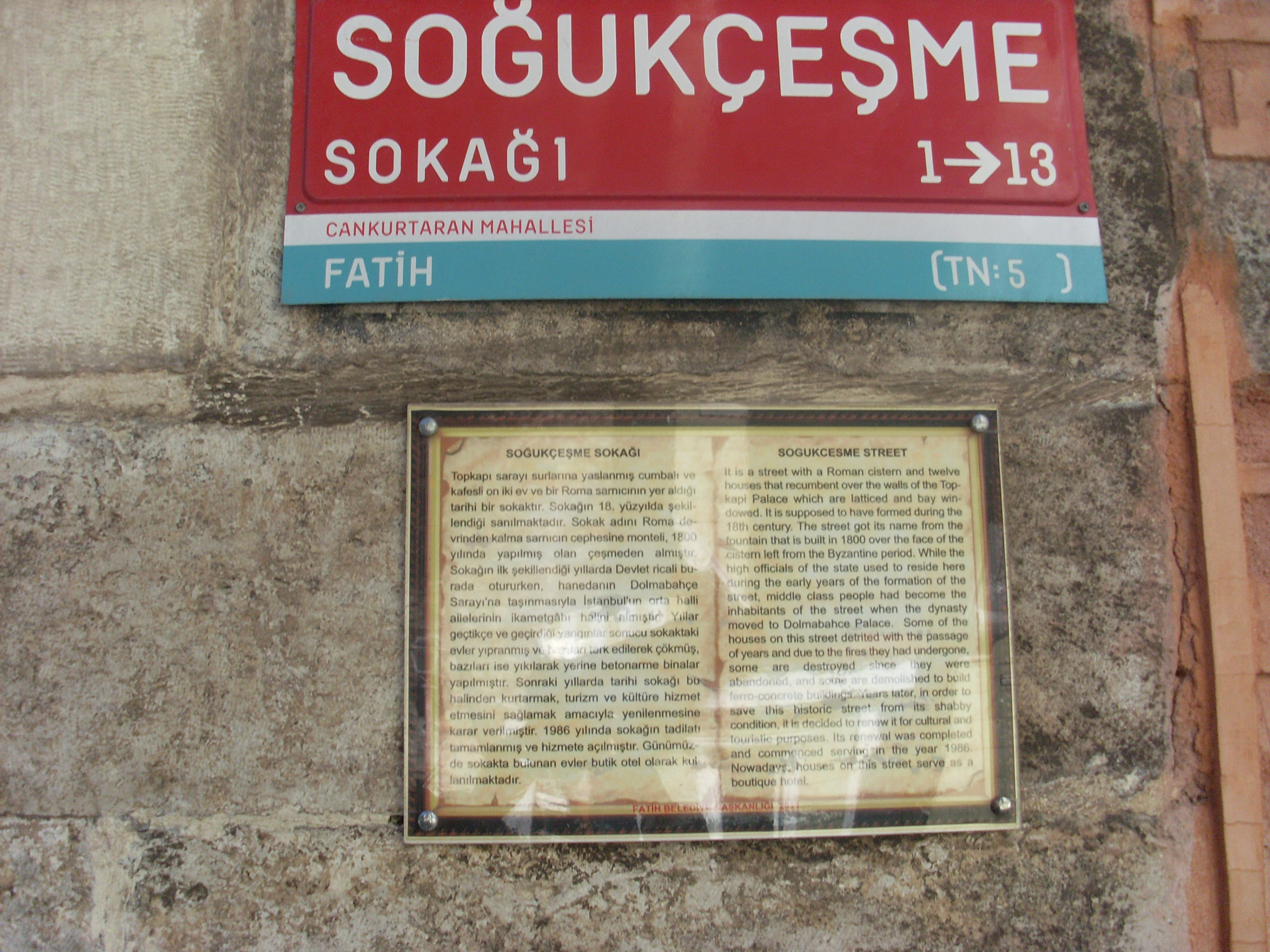
Street sign of Soğukçeşme Street in Fatih

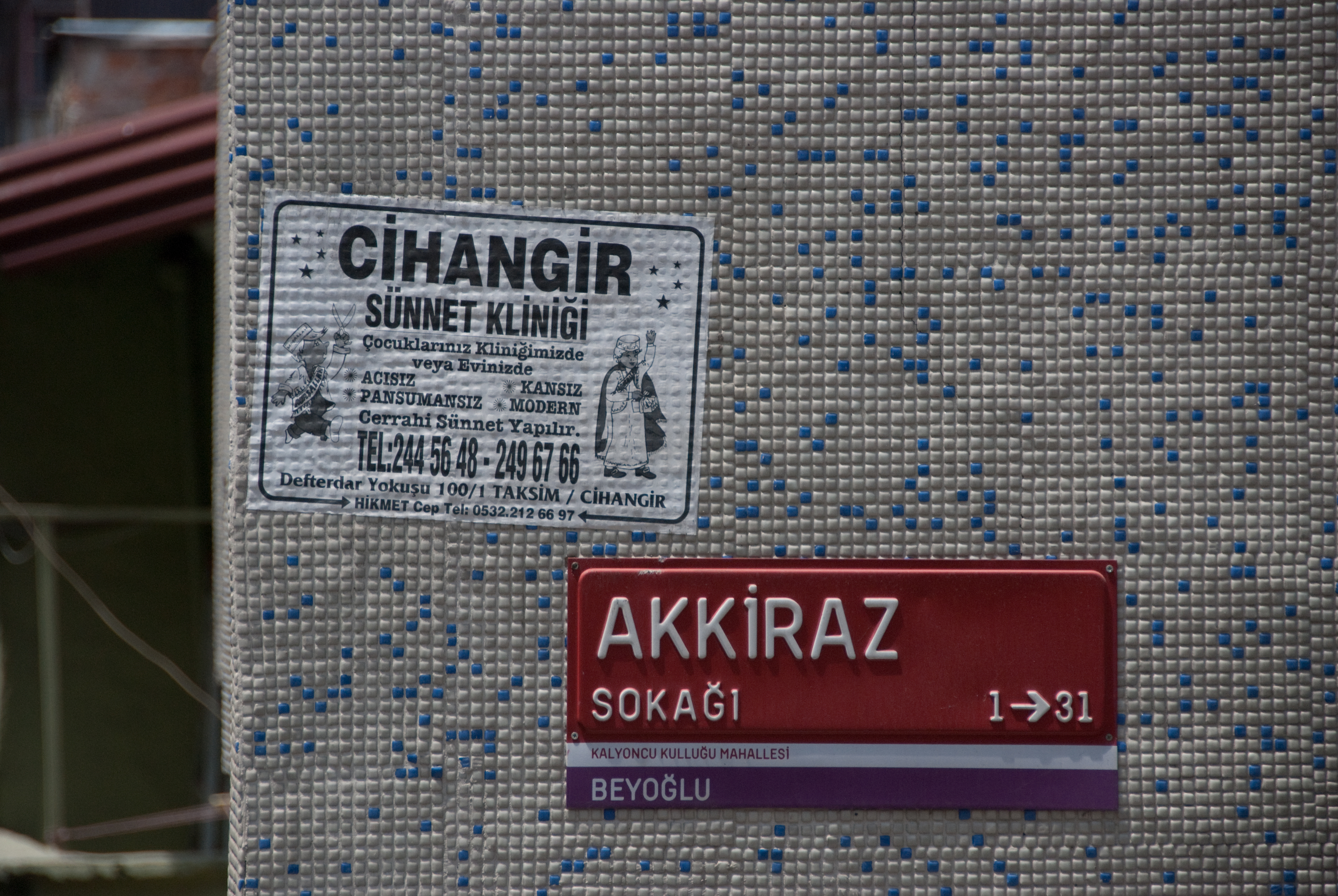
Street sign of Akkiraz Street in Beyoğlu

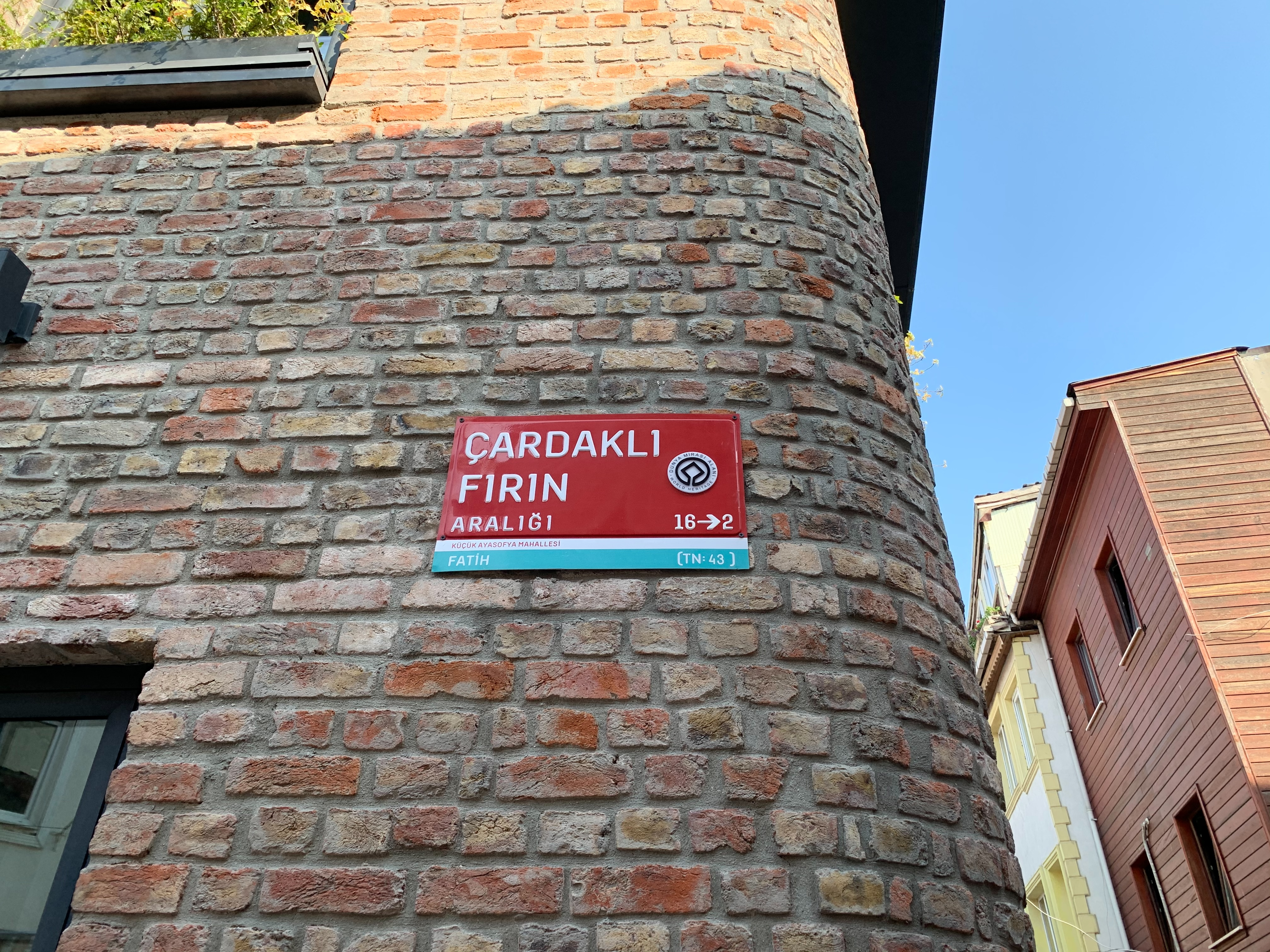
Street sign of Çardaklı Fırın Aralığı in Fatih, featuring the World Heritage emblem

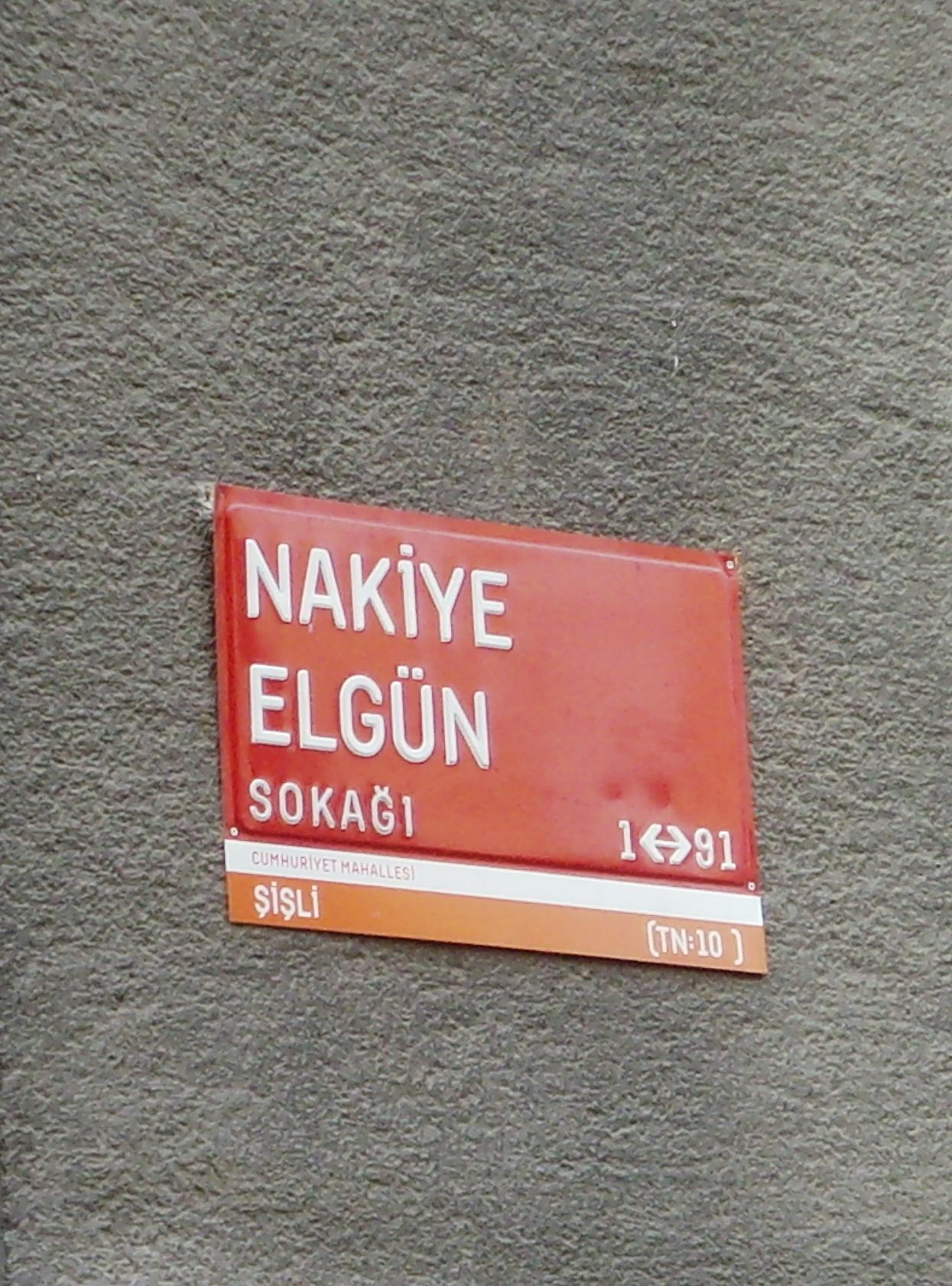
Street sign of Nakiye Elgün Street in Şişli

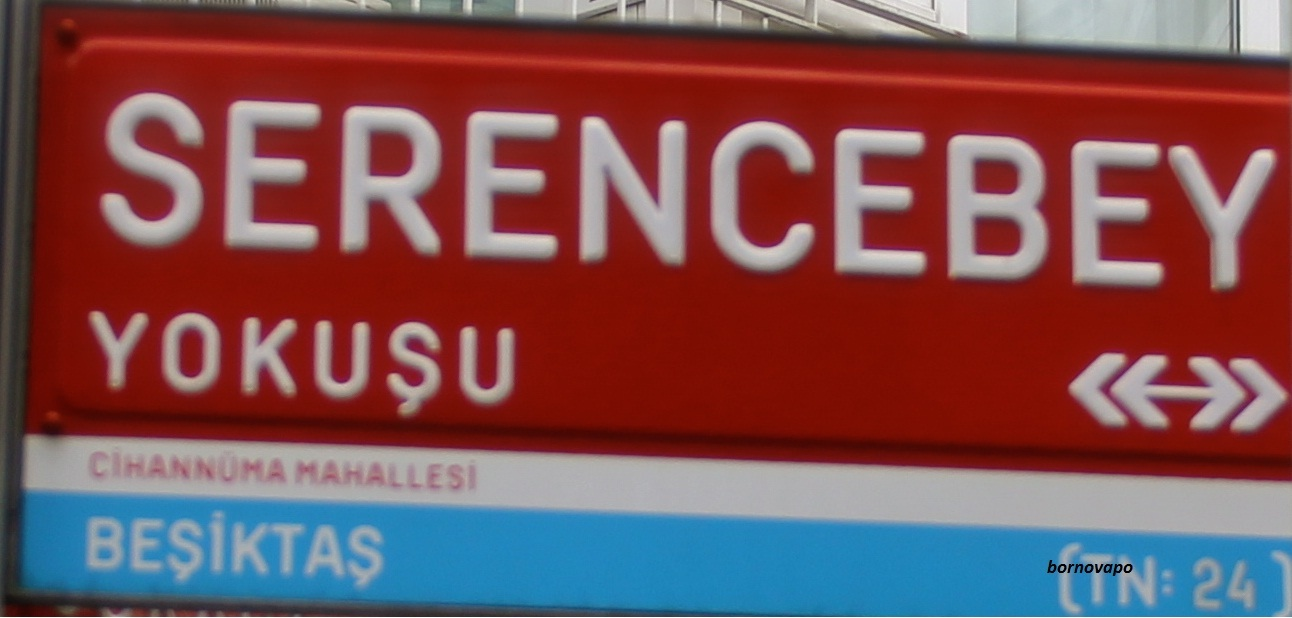
Street sign of Serencebey Street in Beşiktaş
