= Hatice Özgener =

Turkish politician

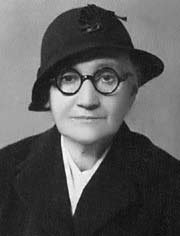
- Hatice Özgener (1936)

Deputy of Çankırı
- In office January 12, 1936 – March 26, 1939

Personal details
- Born: Hatice; 1865 Sanjak of Salonica, Ottoman Greece
- Died: February 21, 1940 (aged 74–75)
- Party: Republican People's Party (CHP)
- Occupation: School teacher, politician
- Known for: One of the first 18 female Turkish members of the parliament

Hatice Özgener (1865 – February 21, 1940) was a Turkish school teacher, politician and one of the first 18 female members of the Turkish parliament.

== Early life ==
Hatice was born to Sheikh Mustafa and his spouse Fatma in Sanjak of Salonica, Ottoman Greece in 1865. She was schooled in the "Red School", and then attended the newly-opened Girls' Secondary School in Thessaloniki.

== School teacher career ==
Hatice was appointed assistant teacher at the Girls' Secondary School in Thessaloniki, serving at this position from October 1878 to September 1885. End September 1894, she resigned from her assistant teacher post at the Secondary School. In August 1900, she returned to the same school as a teacher and served until end November 1911, in the last months teaching also drawing. Between December 1912 and March 1913, she received special payment from the government due to the occupation of Thessaloniki by Greeks during the First Balkan War in 1912.

She served as a teacher of history at several schools in Istanbul, such as at Istanbul Teacher's College (from March 1913), Süleymaniye Girl's Secondary School (from March 1914), Istanbul Industrial Vocational School for Girls (from December 1914) and Kadıköy Orphanage School for Girls (from March 1915). In 1919, she was promoted to principal at Çağlayan Orphanage School. She ended her career resigning in August 1924 after she was appointed a teacher at Beykoz Orphanage School one month earlier.

== Politician career ==
Inline with the law of suffrage enacted in 1934, Turkish women were granted to vote and run for a seat in the parliament. She was nominated by the Republican People's Party (CHP) in the intermediate election held on January 12, 1936. She became a member of the 5th Parliament as a deputy of Çankırı Province. She was so one of the first 18 female members of the parliament joining the 17 female members, who entered the parliament already following the 1935 general election. During her term, Özgener served in the parliamentary commission of Health and Social Welfare.

Hatice Özgener attended the parliamentary sessions wearing a modern hat instead of a headscarf, which was usual before the 1934 ban of religion-based clothing.

== Later years ==
Hatice Özgener died on February 21, 1940.
