= Mebrure Aksoley =

Turkish politician

Grand National Assembly of Turkey Deputy of Ankara
- In office 28 February 1943 – 22 May 1950

Constituent Assembly of Turkey Delegate of CHP
- In office 6 January 1961 – 24 October 1961

Senate of the Republic Deputy of Istanbul
- In office 7 June 1964 – 14 October 1973

Personal details
- Born: Emine Mebrure; 10 August 1902 Thessaloniki, Ottoman Empire
- Died: 2 March 1984 (aged 81)
- Party: Republican People's Party (CHP)
- Spouse: Ahmet İhsan Aksoley (m. 1923; died 1975)
- Education: Law
- Alma mater: Ankara University Law School
- Occupation: Educator, politician

Emine Mebrure Aksoley (10 August 1902 – 2 March 1984) was a Turkish educator, philanthropist, politician, women's rights activist, member of parliament, and senator.

== Early life, education, and family ==
Emine Mebrure was born on 10 August 1902, daughter to Turkish parents Halit Sezai (Güran), a retired major of the Ottoman Army Corps of Engineers, and his spouse Fatma in Thessaloniki, then Ottoman Empire. She lived in Thessaloniki until the outbreak of Balkan Wars in 1912. The family moved then to Anatolia, and she lived in Bandırma and Alaşehir due to her father's duty in the military right after the beginning of World War I.

She completed elementary school in Bandırma and middle school at İzmir High School for Girls. She completed her secondary education at Üsküdar Çamlıca High School for Girls in Istanbul. The family settled in Ankara when her father joined the Turkish War of Independence (1919–1922).

In 1923, she married Ahmet İhsan (Aksoley) (1899–1975), who would be an engineer and officer of the Turkish Army and retired as a Brigadier. Due to her husband's higher education abroad, she lived a long time in Germany, and also spent some time in France, England, and Hungary. She conducted research on social institutions during her stay in Germany.

After returning home, she attended Ankara University Law School and graduated with distinction in 1938. She started a career as an educator, opening a private elementary school in Çankaya district of Ankara.

== Social activist ==
In 1938, she entered the "Village Affairs" branch at Ankara Halkevi. The next year, she collaborated with the relief committee for the victims of the 1939 Erzincan earthquake. Between 1940 and 1941, Aksolay was a member of the "Yardımseverler Cemiyeti" ("Philanthropists Association"), and served as its secretary general and vice chairperson.

Aksoley was among the founders of the "Türk Kadınlar Birliği" ("Turkish Women's Union") during its re-establishment on 13 April 1949. The organization had been founded on 7 February 1924, but dissolved itself after the 1935 Turkish general election when they were satisfied with the swearing-in of 18 women politicians in the parliament. Between 1949 and 1951, Aksoley served as the chairperson of the organization.

== Politician ==
Aksoley entered politics in 1928 as a member of the Republican People's Party (CHP). She served as a Deputy of Ankara in two terms, the 7th (1943–1946) and the 8th parliament (1946–1950), of the Turkish Grand National Assembly (TBMM). During her membership, she served on several parliamentary committees.

After her tenure in the TBMM, Aksoley took charge of several administrative posts in the CHP, and continued her involvement in social activities.

In 1961, Aksoley was appointed to the Constituent Assembly of Turkey, established by the military rule of 1960 Turkish coup d'état, representing CHP. She was elected to the Senate of the Republic as a Deputy of Istanbul from CHP at the 1/3 Senate renewal after the 1964 Turkish Senate election, and served at this post until 1973. She was part of the parliamentary delegation that officially visited Yugoslavia in September 1967.

== Writer ==
Aksoley wrote articles defending women's rights and Atatürk's principles in the CHP-owned newspaper Ulus. In 1970, she wrote about her 42-year political career in the CHP in a book titled C.H.P de 42 Yıllık Çalışmalarımdan Bazı Örnekler (Some Examples From My 42 Years of Work at C.H.P).

== Death ==
Aksoley died on 2 March 1984, aged 81.
