= Benal Nevzat Arıman =

Turkish politician (1903–1990)

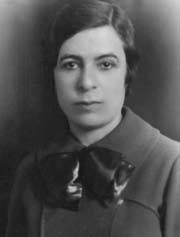
- Arıman in 1935

Deputy of İzmir
- In office 8 February 1935 – 22 May 1950

Personal details
- Born: Benal Zübeyde; 1903 İzmir, Aidin Vilayet, Ottoman Empire
- Died: 19 July 1990 (aged 86–87) Istanbul, Turkey
- Resting place: Zincirlikuyu Cemetery, Istanbul
- Party: Republican People's Party (CHP)
- Education: University of Paris
- Occupation: Poet, writer, politician
- Known for: One of the first 18 female Turkish members of the parliament

Benal Zübeyde Nevzat (İştar) Arıman (1903 – 19 July 1990) was a Turkish poet, writer and politician. She was one of the first 18 female members of the Turkish parliament.

== Private life ==
Benal Nevzat was born to Tevfik Nevzat and his wife Cemile in İzmir, in the Aidin Vilayet of the Ottoman Empire, in 1903. She had two sisters Emine Menije (Öke) and Mutahhara (Keskiner). Her father, a lawyer, prominent local journalist, poet and a member of the Young Turks, was imprisoned in Adana for opposition to Ottoman Sultan Abdul Hamid II's (reigned 1876–1909) press censorship. He was killed in the prison on 17 May 1905, three months prior to his release. His death was officially declared as suicide. The family faced financial difficulties after the Ottoman government seized the office following her father's death.

She was schooled in the "Bedreka-yi İrfan", a private primary school of the notable educator Yusuf Rıza Efendi. She completed her secondary education at Lycée Notre Dame de Sion, İzmir. In 1922, she was sent to France for education upon recommendation of Mustafa Kemal (later Atatürk), as he liberated İzmir from Greek invasion. She entered the Faculty of Letters at the University of Paris. During her study in Paris, she was supported by her paternal uncle Refik Nevzat, a prominent Young Turk. She graduated four years later, and returned home in 1926.

In 1936, she married Neşet Arıman, general manager of the Turkish representation of the Singer Corporation. She gave birth to their daughter İştar (Güralp).

Benal Nevzat Arıman died on 19 July 1990. She was interred at the Zincirlikuyu Cemetery following the religious ceremony at Teşvikiye Mosque.

== Career ==
As a member, Benal Nevzat served for several charity organizations, like Turkish Red Crescent (Ottoman Turkish: Hilal-i Ahmer or today Turkish: Kızılay), the Society for the Protection of Children (Ottoman Turkish: Himaye-i Etfal or today Turkish: Çocuk Esirgeme Kurumu), Association for Tuberculosis Control (Ottoman Turkish: Verem Mücadele Cemiyeti or today Turkish: Verem Savaş Derneği) and soup kitchen.

In 1926, she entered the Republican People's Party (CHP), and became so the first female member of the party's İzmir branch. She served four years in the provincial administrative board of the party. Between 1930 and 1934, she served as an alderman becoming so the first female member of the city council of İzmir. In the years 1932–1934, she was a member in the Committee for Language, History and Literature of the İzmir Community Center (Turkish: Halkevi).

In addition to her political, social and cultural activities, she wrote poems, short stories, columns and made translations, which were published in several journals and periodicals, like Hizmet (1926–1932), Fikirler Derfisi (1927–1928), Ahenk (1927–1929), Anadolu (1929–1934) and Halkın Sesi (1932). She took part in the 1931-established Association of Literature (Turkish: Edebiyat Cemiyeti). Even though in limited number, she continued to publish her poems and columns in the İzmir media after 1934.

Through legislation enacted on 5 December 1934, Turkish women gained full universal suffrage. President Mustafa Kemal Atatürk (in office 1923–1938), aware of the political activities of Benal Nevzat, recommended her nomination for the general election. She entered the 5th parliament as a deputy of İzmir following the 1935 general election held on 8 February. She became so one of the first 18 female members of the Turkish parliament.

During the first four-year parliamentary term, she was part of the Committee for Economics. She was elected three times more, and kept her seat in the 6th, 7th and 8th parliaments until 22 May 1950.

She published a play Kara Osman in 1973 and a poetry book Aytım in 1974.

== Legacy ==
A performance hall in the seventh floor in the Türkan Saylan Cultural Center of the İzmir's Konak Municipality is named "Benal Nevzat Hall".
