= Ayşe Şekibe İnsel =

Turkish politician

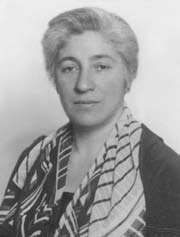
- Fatma Şekibe İnsel (1935)

Member of the Grand National Assembly
- In office 8 February 1935 – 3 April 1939

Personal details
- Born: Fatma Şekibe; 1886 Constantinople, Ottoman Empire
- Died: 29 March 1970 (aged 83–84)
- Party: Republican People's Party (CHP)
- Education: Deutsche Schule Istanbul
- Occupation: Farmer

Ayşe Şekibe İnsel (1886 – 29 March 1970) was a Turkish farmer, politician and one of the first 18 female members of the parliament.

== Private life ==
Ayşe Şekibe was born to Dr. Şekip Bey and his spouse Fatma Hanım in Istanbul, then Ottoman Empire in 1886. She spent her youth years in Istanbul. She attended Istanbul Vocational School for Girls and the Deutsche Schule Istanbul.

In 1905, she married Mehmet Kemalettin Bey, and became the mother of a son. She had knowledge of the German language because of her secondary education and her stay awhile in Germany due to her son's school. She settled in İsaören village of İnegöl district in Bursa Province, where she was occupied with farming.

Ayşe Şekibe İnsel died on 29 March 1970.

== Politics ==
Following the women's suffrage law in 1934, Turkish women were granted the right to vote and be elected into the parliament. She entered politics and was nominated by the Republican People's Party (CHP) for the 1935 general election held on 8 February. She won a seat in the Turkish Grand National Assembly. She became so a deputy among the 18 female politicians, who entered the parliament for the first time in its history. She served in the 5th parliament as a deputy of Bursa electoral district. She was a member of the "Parliamentary Committee for Agriculture", and focused her works in policies of agriculture and farming as she had over twenty years of experience among farmers. In a report she submitted in 1935, she emphasized the historical importance of İznik, Bursa (historically Nicaea) for tourism. She served in the parliament until 3 April 1939.
