= Türkan Örs Baştuğ =

Turkish politician

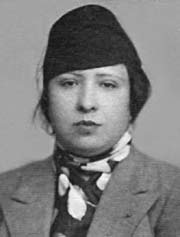
- Türkan Örs Baştuğ (1935)

Deputy of Antalya
- In office February 9, 1935 – February 27, 1943

Personal details
- Born: Türkan; 1900 Üsküdar, Istanbul, Ottoman Empire
- Died: September 27, 1975 (aged 74–75)
- Party: Republican People's Party (CHP)
- Education: Philosophy
- Alma mater: Istanbul University
- Occupation: School teacher, politician
- Known for: One of the first 18 female Turkish members of the parliament

Türkan Örs Baştuğ (1900 – September 27, 1975) was a Turkish school teacher, politician and one of the first 18 female members of the Turkish parliament.

== Private life ==
Türkan was born to Mehmet Sabri and his spouse Abide in Üsküdar, Istanbul, then Ottoman Empire, in 1900. After finishing Bezmialem School, she studied philosophy in Darülfünun, the forerunner of Istanbul University. She graduated in 1925 as one of the first female students of the Philosophy Department.

After the enactment of 1934 Surname Law, she took the family name "Baştuğ". Türkan Baştuğ married to Bekir İzzet Örs in 1937. The marriage lasted until 1946.

== School teacher career ==
Right after her graduation, she began working as a school teacher for sociology, psychology, logic and metaphysics at Bosphorus High School. In the same time, she served as the principal of the girls' section of the high school. Additionally, she taught a brief time philosophy per procuration at Teacher's College for Girls in 1927, and at Istanbul Girls High School in 1930.

== Politician career ==
According to the law of suffrage enacted in 1934, Turkish women were granted to vote and run for a seat in the parliament. As she saw a chance to enter active politics, she resigned from her teacher post, and applied for a candidate position by the Republican People's Party (CHP) for the 1935 general election held on February 8. She entered the 5th Parliament as a deputy of Antalya. She became so one of the first 18 female members of the parliament.

In a report about her electoral district she prepared for the parliament in 1935, Baştuğ noted that the tribes living scattered in the seaside area should be settled down, the marshes causing malaria should be drained, the mosque in Elmalı, which is believed to be built by the famous Ottoman chief architect Mimar Sinan (c. 1488/1490–1588), needs restoration, the village teachers should be re-educated to prevent their rustification.

Outside of her parliamentary work, Baştuğ participated at the 12th International Congress of Women held in Istanbul between April 18–26, 1935, and delivered a speech on "The Powers and Duties of A Female Citizen". On May 25, 1935, she was elected a substitute member of the board of the Turkish Aeronautical Association (Turkish: Türk Hava Kurumu).

She kept her seat in the 6th Parliament until the 1943 general election held on February 28. Örs Baştuğ served in the parliamentary committee for education during her term.

Türkan Örs Baştuğ attended the parliamentary sessions wearing a modern hat instead of a headscarf, which was usual before the 1934 ban of religion-based clothing.

== Later years ==
After leaving politics, Türkan Örs Baştuğ returned to her profession as a school teacher. On August 4, 1943, she was appointed teacher for philosophy at Anakara Atatürk High School. She retired from this post on October 5, 1963.

Türkan Örs Baştuğ died on September 27, 1975.
