= Meliha Ulaş =

Turkish politician

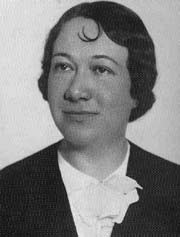
Meliha Ulaş

Ayşe Meliha Ulaş Ekeman (1901 – 17 February 1942) was a Turkish politician.

== Biography ==
Ayşe Meliha was born in Sinop in 1901. She graduated from the Department of Literature in Darülfünun, today Istanbul University. She was fluent in French and English languages. She worked as a literary teacher at Kandilli High School in Istanbul, five years as a teacher of literature at Girls' Muilim School in Erzurum and Samsun High School.

In the general elections held on 8 February 1935, 17 women deputies entered the Grand National Assembly of Turkey including Meliha Ulaş. She entered the parliament as a deputy of Samsun from the Republican People's Party (CHP). She served in the 5th and 6th Parliament as the first female deputy of Samsun.

Ulaş Ekeman died on 17 February 1942.
