= National Women's Party of Turkey =

Turkish political party

The National Women's Party of Turkey (Turkish: Türkiye Ulusal Kadınlar Partisi, TUKP for short) was a former Turkish political party, founded in 1972 by Mübeccel Göktuna in Istanbul. The goal of the party was to increase women's participation in politics. The party was still establishing enough branch offices to meet legal requirements to be registered for the election when the activities of all Turkish parties were suspended as a result of the 1980 Turkish coup d'état. In 1981 the party was closed by the military rule, as were all other political parties. The National Women's party was not revived after Turkey returned to civilian democracy in 1983. In June 2014, however, women's rights activists submitted a petition to the Interior Ministry for a new Woman Party (Kadın Partisi) to be formally registered as a political party.

== History ==
The National Women's Party of Turkey (Turkish: Türkiye Ulusal Kadınlar Partisi, TUKP for short) was a former Turkish political party. TUKP was founded on 17 November 1972 by Mübeccel Göktuna in Istanbul. Although Turkish women gained universal suffrage in 1934, in the 1970s women's participation in Turkish politics was very low. For example, in the 1969 elections only 5 women MPs were elected to the 450-seat lower house of the parliament.

Thus the goal of the TUKP party was to increase women's participation in politics. However the party faced with legal barriers. In order to enter the elections, the party had to form branch offices in at least 15 provinces which the party failed to achieve. Before they were able to fulfill the legal requirements to enter the election however, the activities of all Turkish parties were suspended as a result of the 1980 Turkish coup d'état. On 16 September 1981 the party (like all other parties) was closed by the military rule. Unlike main parties, the National Women's party was not revived after Turkey returned to civilian democracy in 1983. In June 2014, however, women's rights activists (led by Benal Yazgan) submitted a petition to the Interior Ministry for a new Woman Party (Kadın Partisi) to be formally registered as a political party.

== See also ==
- Women in Turkish politics
