= Nermin Abadan Unat =

Turkish politician, lawyer and sociologist (1921–2025)

Senator of the Turkish Senate
- In office 1978–1980

Personal details
- Born: 18 September 1921 Vienna, First Austrian Republic
- Died: 11 December 2025 (aged 104) Istanbul, Turkey
- Resting place: Zincirlikuyu Cemetery
- Education: Istanbul University (LLB); University of Minnesota; Ankara University (PhD)
- Occupation: Academic; lawyer; sociologist; writer

Nermin Abadan Unat (18 September 1921 – 11 December 2025) was a Turkish academic, lawyer, sociologist, writer and a professor at Boğaziçi University. She studied Turkish immigration as well as women's rights in Turkey. From 1978 to 1980, she was a member of the Senate of Turkey, which has since been abolished.

Unat was one of the leading faces in the development of communications management in Turkey. She introduced the word ''Kamuoyu'' to the Turkish language as a translation for the term public opinion. Similarly, she was the first person to use the term ''Halkla Münasebetler'' in literary works as a translation for the term public relations.

== Life and career ==
Unat went to İzmir Girls' High School when she was younger, after which she graduated from the Istanbul University Faculty of Law. She continued to work for a newspaper named Ulus from 1944 to 1950 following her graduation. She received a Fulbright Scholarship to attend the University of Minnesota, where she graduated in 1953.

After completing her education, she went on to work as an assistant in Ankara University Faculty of Political Sciences. She became an associate professor five years later, and a full professor in 1966. Unat, who founded the Political Behavior Institute in the same faculty, worked in many places abroad. She mainly dealt with issues of immigrant Turkish workers and women's issues abroad. Her book, Woman in Turkish Society, was also published in German and English.

She served as the vice president of the International Political Science Association (IPSA), president of the Turkish Social Sciences Association, and since 1978, vice president of the Council of Europe's Gender Equality Commission. Between 1978 and 1980, she entered the Turkish Senate of the Republic as a quota senator for the Republican People's Party.

She was awarded the Vehbi Koç award in 2012 for the value she added to the field of education.

Nermin Abadan Unat taught at Boğaziçi University and Istanbul University's Women Research Center. She received a medal of merit from the President of Germany. Her books and articles on Turkish workers abroad have been translated in German, English and French.

Unat died on 11 December 2025, at the age of 104, in Istanbul. Following the religious service held at Barbaros Hayrettin Pasha Mosque, she was buried at Zincirlikuyu Cemetery.

== Publications ==
- Migration and Development (Nuffic & SBF, Ankara, 1975)
- Abadan-Unat, Nermin (1976). Turkish Workers in Europe 1960–1975: A Socio-economic Reappraisal. Brill. ISBN 978-90-04-04478-4.
- Abadan-Unat, Nermin, ed. (1981). Women in Turkish Society. Brill. ISBN 978-90-04-06346-4.
- Women in the Developing World: Evidence from Turkey, (University of Denver, 1986)
- Migration without end.... From Guestworker to Transnational Citizen (İstanbul Bilgi University:Istanbul, 2002)

== See also ==
- Women in Turkish politics
