= Mübeccel Göktuna =

Turkish politician

Mübeccel Göktuna (1915 – October 3, 1999) was a Turkish politician. Se was one of the first woman political party leaders of Turkey. She founded the National Women's Party of Turkey. Established in 1972 and banned in 1980 during the military takeover of the Government, TUKP was the first all-women Turkish political party. Goktuna served as the founder of the party and its leader throughout the party's existence.

TUKP's main purpose was to increase the presence of women in politics and especially in the Turkish Parliament. By 1977, TUKP had established offices in three cities (Istanbul, Ankara and İzmir) with several branches in Istanbul. The number of delegates had exceeded 500. However, TUKP was never able to participate in any general elections because they did not meet the minimum requirement of being established in 12 cities. Although they had plans to open 9 new offices, the military coup of September 12, 1980 halted all activities.

Goktuna was under house arrest for a period of one month following the coup. Eventually, TUKP was shut down by the new military government, which was the same for all other political parties, never to resume activities again.

Since then, Goktuna attempted several times to re-establish the party but without success. Nevertheless, she was recognized as being the first woman to lead a political party in the Republic of Turkey.

Mubeccel Goktuna died of natural causes on October 3, 1999. She is buried in the Karacaahmet Cemetery in Istanbul, Turkey.
