= List of hospitals in Ankara Province =

This is a list of hospitals in Ankara Province, Turkey. Ankara, Turkey's capital, has more than 60 hospitals.

== State hospitals ==
- Ankara Egitim Ve Arastirma Hastanesi (Ankara Training and Research Hospital)
- Ankara Fizik Tedavi Ve Rehabilitasyon Merkezi / Ankara Physical Therapy and Rehabilitation Center
- Ankara Numune Hastanesi / Ankara Numune Hospital
- Ankara Onkoloji Hastanesi / Ankara Oncology Hospital
- Ankara Verem Savaş Derneği Hastanesi / Ankara Battling Tuberculosis Foundation Hospital
- Atatürk Araştırma Hastanesi (eski adiyla Trafik Hastanesi) / Atatürk Research Hospital (previously Traffic Hospital)
- Atatürk Sanatoryumu Göğüs Hastalıkları Hastanesi / Atatürk Senatorium Hospital for Breast Diseases
- Büyükşehir Belediye Hastanesi / Greater Municipality Hospital
- Deri Ve Zührevi Hastalıkları Hastanesi / Dermatological & Venereal Diseases Hospital
- Dr. M. Ülker Acil Yardım Ve Travmatoloji Hastanesi / Dr. M. Ülker Emergency Trauma Hospital
- Dr. Sami Ulus Çocuk Hastanesi / Dr. Sami Ulus Children's Hospital
- Dr. Zekai Tahir Burak Kadın Hastanesi / Dr. Zekai Tahir Burak Women's Hospital
- Etimesgut Devlet Hastanesi / Etimesgut State Hospital
- Muhittin Ülker Acil Yardım Hastanesi / Muhittin Ülker Emergency Hospital
- PTT Rüzgarlı Dispanseri / PTT Rüzgarlı Dispensary
- S.B. Ankara Hastanesi / S.B. Ankara Hospital
- Türkiye Yüksek İhtisas Hastanesi / Turkish High Specialty Hospital
- TC Ziraat Bankası Hastanesi / Turkish Ziraat Bank Hospital
- TCDD Hastanesi / Turkish State Railways Hospital,
- Ankara Meslek Hastanesi / Ankara Occupational Hospital

== Social security hospitals ==
- SSK Ankara Eğitim Hastanesi, Dışkapı
- SSK Ankara Çocuk Hastanesi
- SSK İhtisas Hastanesi
- SSK Meslek Hastalıkları Hastanesi
- SSK Ulus Hastanesi
- SSK Ulucanlar Dispanseri
- SSK Yenişehir Dispanseri

== Birth hospitals ==
- SSK Etlik Doğumevi
- Zübeyde Hanım Doğumevi

== University hospitals ==
- Ankara Üniversitesi Tıp Fakültesi Hastanesi
- Ankara Üniversitesi Tıp Fakültesi Cebeci Hastanesi
- Ankara Üniversitesi Tıp Fakültesi İbni Sina Hastanesi
- Başkent Üniversitesi Hastanesi(private)
- Fatih Üniversitesi Tıp Fakültesi Hastanesi(private)
- Gazi Üniversitesi Tıp Fakültesi Hastanesi(state)
- Gazi Üniversitesi Tıp Fakültesi Gölbaşı Hastanesi(state)
- Hacettepe Üniversitesi Tıp Fakültesi Hastanesi

== Military hospitals ==
- Ankara Gülhane Askeri Tıp Akademisi
- Ankara Mevki Asker Hastanesi
- Etimesgut Hava Hastanesi

== Private hospitals ==
- ANKARA VEREM SAVAŞ DERNEĞİ NUSRET KARASU GÖĞÜS HASTALIKLARI VE TÜBERKÜLOZ HASTANESİ
- LOKMAN HEKİM HAST.
- ÇANKAYA HASTANESİ
- ÖZEL AKAY HASTANESİ
- ÖZEL AKROPOL HASTANESİ
- ÖZEL ANKARA GÜVEN HASTANESİ
- ÖZEL ANKARA MEDICAL PARK HASTANESİ
- ÖZEL ANKARA MEMORIAL HASTANESI
- ÖZEL ANKARA UMUT HASTANESİ
- ÖZEL BAYINDIR HASTANESİ
- ÖZEL BİLGİ HASTANESİ
- ÖZEL ERYAMAN HASTANESİ
- ÖZEL ETİMED HASTANESI
- ÖZEL KEÇİÖREN HASTANESİ
- ÖZEL KORU ANKARA HASTANESİ
- ÖZEL KORU SİNCAN HASTANESİ
- ÖZEL KUDRET İNTERNATIONAL HOSPITAL
- ÖZEL LOKMAN HEKİM ANKARA HASTANESİ
- ÖZEL LÖSANTE LÖSEMİLİ ÇOCUKLAR HASTANESİ
- ÖZEL LİV HOSPITAL ANKARA
- ÖZEL MEDİCANA İNTERNATİONAL ANKARA HASTANESİ
- ÖZEL NATOMED HASTANESİ
- ÖZEL ORTADOĞU HASTANESİ
- ÖZEL ORTADOĞU 19 MAYIS HASTANESİ
- ÖZEL POLATLI CAN HASTANESİ
- ÖZEL TOBB ETÜ HASTANESİ
- ÖZEL YÜZÜNCÜYIL HASTANESİ
- ÖZEL ÇANKAYA YAŞAM HASTANESİ
- ÖZEL A LİFE ANKARA HASTANESİ
- ÖZEL A LİFE PURSAKLAR HASTANESİ
