= Mihri Pektaş =

Turkish politician

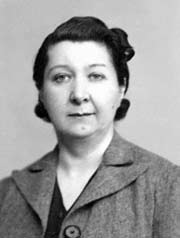
- Mihri Pektaş (1939)

Deputy of Malatya
- In office 8 February 1935 – 5 August 1946

Personal details
- Born: Mihri İffet; 1895 Bursa, Ottoman Empire
- Died: 4 July 1979 (aged 83–84)
- Party: Republican People's Party (CHP)
- Children: 2
- Education: Arnavutköy American High School for Girls
- Occupation: School teacher, politician
- Known for: One of the first 18 female Turkish members of the parliament

Mihri İffet Pektaş (1895 – 4 July 1979), also known as Mihri Bektaş, was a Turkish school teacher and former politician. She is known as one of the first 18 female parliament members of Turkey.

Mihri İffet was born in Bursa, then Ottoman Empire. In 1916, she graduated from Arnavutköy American High School for Girls in Istanbul. After graduation, she taught Turkish in the same institution between 1916 and 1918. After 1920, she began teaching English in various schools in Istanbul. She was also a part-time nurse.

She was married to Hüseyin Pektaş, vice principal of Robert College, and interpreter of the Turkish delegation at the Conference of Lausanne during 1922 and 1923. She was mother of two.

== Political career ==
Turkish women achieved voting rights in local elections on 3 April 1930. Four years later, on 5 December 1934, they gained full universal suffrage, earlier than most other countries. Mihri Pektaş joined the Republican People's Party (CHP), and was elected in the general election held on 8 February 1935 from Malatya Province into the 5th Parliament of Turkey. She was among the first 18 women members of the Turkish parliament. She kept her seat in the parliament in the following two terms up to 5 August 1946.

== Aftermath ==
After 1946, Pektaş resumed her teaching career, and between 1947 and 1950, she participated in the United Nations Entity for Gender Equality and the Empowerment of Women. She died on 4 July 1979.
