= Esma Nayman =

Turkish politician (1899–1967)

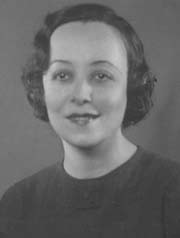
- Esma Nayman

Personal details
- Born: 1899 Istanbul, Ottoman Empire
- Died: 16 December 1967 (aged 67–68) Istanbul, Turkey
- Spouse: Zihni Nayman
- Children: 1
- Occupation: Teacher, translator, politician
- Known for: One of the first female MPs of Turkey

Esma Nayman (1899 – 16 December 1967) was a Turkish politician.

== Early life ==
Nayman was born to Hasip and Melek in Istanbul, Ottoman Empire, in 1899. She taught French for seven years in Bezmialem Girls' High School. In 1927, she married an attorney named Zihni who later assumed the surname Nayman, and settled in Adana. The next year, she gave birth to a son Erdem.

== Politics ==
Turkish women achieved voting rights in the local elections on 3 April 1930. Four years later, on 5 December 1934, they gained universal suffrage, earlier than most other countries. Nayman joined the Republican People's Party (CHP), and was elected in the election held on 8 February 1935 from Adana Province, then known as Seyhan Province, as one of the first seventeen female politicians into the 5th Parliament of Turkey. In the parliament, she worked on the projects to establish the reformatory schools for the juvenile delinquents.

== Later years ==
After the term in the parliament, she also served in the municipal council of Adana. In 1946, she served in the state-owned news agency Anadolu Agency as a translator.

Nayman died in 1967.
