= Huriye Baha Öniz =

Turkish politician

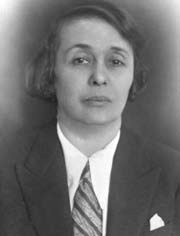
- Huriye Baha Öniz
- In office February 8, 1935 – March 26, 1939

Personal details
- Born: Huriye Baha; 1887 Istanbul, Ottoman Empire
- Died: November 2, 1950 (aged 62–63) Istanbul, Turkey
- Party: Republican People's Party (CHP)
- Children: 1
- Education: Bedford College, London
- Occupation: Politician, teacher
- Religion: Islam

Huriye Baha Öniz (1887 – November 2, 1950) was a Turkish educator and politician. Baha was her father's name and Öniz was the surname which she had assumed after the Surname Law. She was amongst the first group of women elected to the Turkish parliament.

== Life ==
Huriye Baha was born to Baha and Ayşe in Istanbul, then the capital of the Ottoman Empire, in 1887. After primary and secondary schools in İstanbul, she studied teaching at Bedford College, London. She married Hayrettin, and gave birth to a son named Sinasi Ali.

== Teaching career ==
During the Ottoman Empire era, she served in İstanbul as a teacher in various schools for girls. She also served as an educator for people of Turkish descent from Balkan countries who escaped to İstanbul after the Balkan Wars (1912–1913). During the Republican era beginning by 1926, she served in various missionary schools in İstanbul. She taught in a Greek school in 1926, in a Jewish school in 1928 and in an Italian school in 1927. In 1933 she was working in an Armenian school and in a Greek School in 1934. After political career, she continued in an Italian school in 1939. In 1946, she taught in Erenköy Girls High School, and finally in 1949 Beyoğlu Girls School.

Huriye Baha Öniz died in İstanbul on 2 November 1950.

== Political career ==
Turkish women achieved voting rights in local elections on 3 April 1930. Four years later, on 5 December 1934, they gained full universal suffrage, earlier than most other countries. In 1935, for the first time 17 women were elected into the 5th Parliament of Turkey. Huriye Baha Öniz joined the Republican People's Party (CHP), and was elected in the general election held on 8 February 1935 from Diyarbakır Province. In the parliament, she was a member of the commissions of the Forestry, Highways and the Airplane Factory.
