= Hatı Çırpan =

Turkish politician

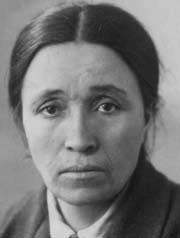
- Hatı Çırpan in 1935

Personal details
- Born: 1890 Kazan, Ankara, Ottoman Empire
- Died: March 21, 1956 (aged 65–66) Ankara, Turkey
- Occupation: Politician

Hatı Çırpan (formerly Satı Kadın, 1890 – March 21, 1956) was a Turkish politician, one of the first female members of the parliament in the Grand National Assembly of Turkey, elected in the 1935 general elections.

== Life ==
She was born in the village of Kahramankazan in 1890. Her father and mother were Kara Mehmet Efendi and Emine Hanım. She was the wife of a soldier who was wounded in the throat during the Balkan War. She was the mother of five children. She worked as a farmer and village headman after her father. On October 26, 1933, after women were given the right to be mukhtars, she won the elections for the village headman of Kazan and became one of the first female mukhtars in Turkey.

Just before the Second Language Congress (İkinci Türk Dil Kurultayı, 18–23 August 1934), on July 16, 1934, President Mustafa Kemal Atatürk left Ankara for an excursion to the village of Kazan (at the time part of Kızılcahamam district of Ankara Province), 50 kilometres (31 mi) away from the capital Ankara. During this excursion, Atatürk was introduced to Satı Kadın, who was the village chief of Kazan. She was a peasant from Central Anatolia who had fought for four years during the Turkish War of Independence. The two engaged in conversation, after which Atatürk was reported to have taken a liking to Satı Kadın's achievements and intelligence.

According to Afet İnan, Atatürk said after meeting her, "This is an exceptional woman who can thrive as a member of the parliament." Satı Kadın was sponsored and supported in her successful campaign for office by Atatürk himself. Later, she changed her first name to Hatı at the advice of Atatürk, who was interested in the civilization of the Hattians at the time, and because her former name Satı meant "sale" or "purchase" in Turkish. She adopted the surname of Çırpan after the 1934 Surname Law required all Turkish citizens to have a surname.

Satı Kadın returned to Kahramankazan after completing her parliamentary duty. She died on March 21, 1956.

There is a mausoleum in Kahramankazan and her house has been restored and turned into a museum.

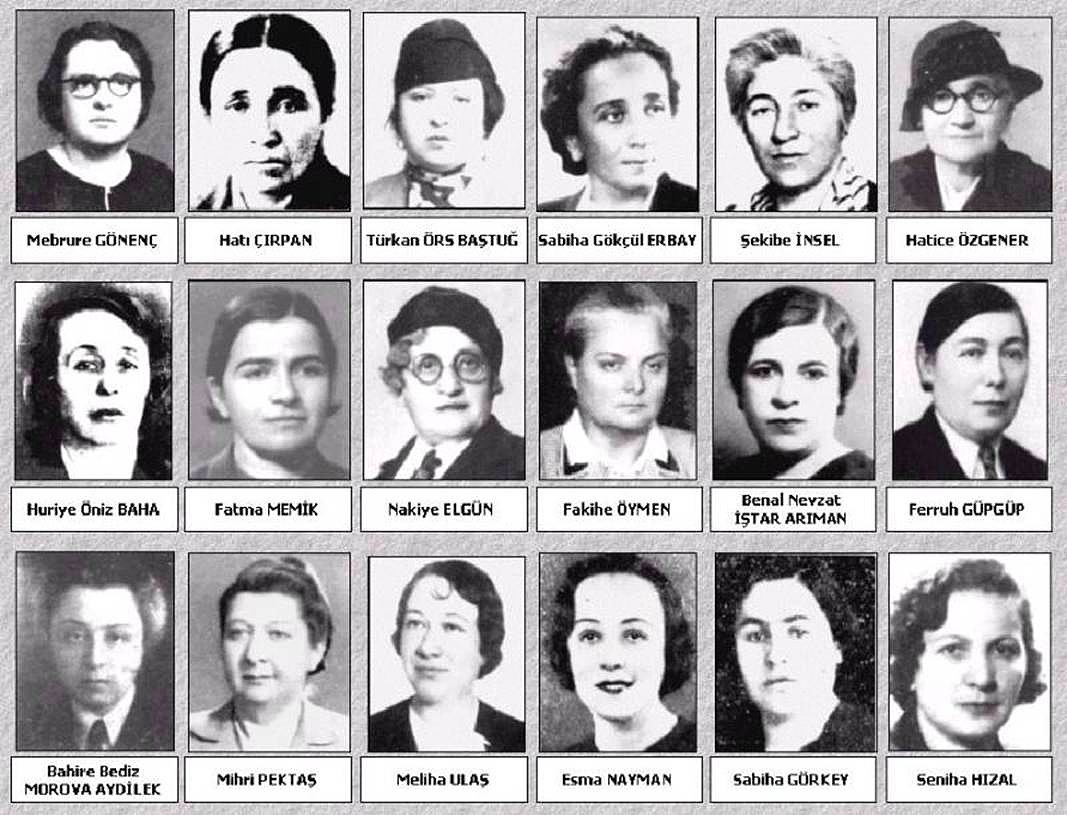
Eighteen female MPs joined the Grand National Assembly of Turkey in 1935.

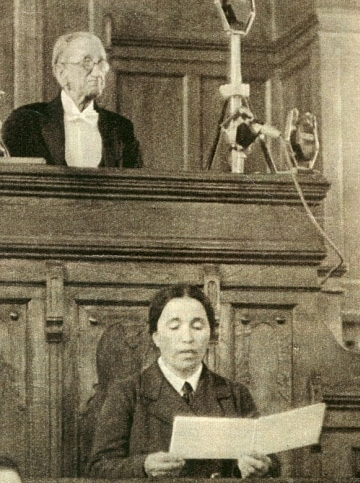
Hatı Çırpan at the rostrum of the Grand National Assembly of Turkey.

== See also ==
- Women in Turkish politics
