= Bahire Bediş Morova Aydilek =

Turkish politician

Bahir Bediş Morova Aydilek
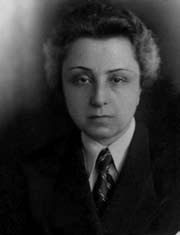

Personal details
- Born: 1897 Bosnia
- Died: November 10, 1938 (aged 40–41) Turkey
- Occupation: Politician

Bahir Bediş Morova Aydilek (1897 – November 10, 1938) was a Turkish artist and politician. She was one of the first 18 women elected to the Grand National Assembly of Turkey.

== Biography ==
After attending primary and secondary school in Bolu, Aydilek became a drawing teacher at a painting school. She quit her job in 1927 because of vision problems and worked for the Republican People's Party (CHP) and the Bolu halkevi.

In 1934 she was noticed by Mustafa Kemal Atatürk, who gave her the name of bediz (later retranscribed bediş), which means "painter".

On February 8, 1935, during the legislative elections of 1935, she was elected MPP of the CHP in the district of Konya. She sat on the Customs and Monopolies Committee of the Fifth Legislature, which was the first to include women.

During her tenure, she showed particular attention to her constituency by defending the construction of irrigation canal projects around Beyşehir Lake, as well as the connection to the rail network with Ankara, the labor law for peasants, penalizations for abuses of public officials' power and measures to protect the historic heritage.

Aydilek died on November 10, 1938, the same day as Atatürk.
