= Ferruh Güpgüp =

Turkish politician

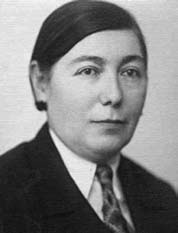
Ferruh Güpgüp

Ferruh Güpgüp (1891, Kayseri – 18 April 1951) was a Turkish politician.

She had private education and knew Arabic. She was a member of Kayseri CHP Administrative Council and City Council. She was a representative of Kayseri in the Turkish parliament and one of the first women to be elected as a parliament member in Turkey.
