= Dârülmuallimât =

Dârülmuallimât or Women's Teachers' Training College was founded in Istanbul in 1870. It was the first state college for women in Istanbul, in Turkey, and in the Ottoman Empire, and played a major pioneer role in the education history of women.

== History ==
The college was founded as a part of the Tanzimat reforms. In 1858, the first state schools open to girls were opened in the Ottoman Empire, and in 1869, girls were also included in the state school system through state girls' schools (though for a long time this was on paper only). Since it was considered unacceptable to have male teachers instruct female students because of the then customary Islamic gender segregation, it was deemed necessary to found a college to educate women teachers to work in the state girls' schools.

In the period of 1910-1911, the school was turned into a boarding school to involve students from the provinces. Students were placed in Saip Paşa Mansion in Fatih Çarşamba.

In the 1915-1916 academic year, there were 737 students at Dârülmuallimât, 499 of whom were boarding students and 238 were day students.
