= Nakiye Elgün =

Turkish politician and educator

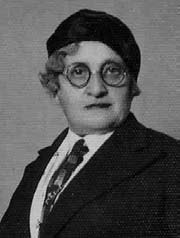
Nakiye Elgün

Nakiye Elgün (1882, Rumelifeneri, Istanbul – 23 March 1954, Istanbul) was a Turkish politician and teacher.

She was one of the educators who worked for the dissemination of girls' education in the late Ottoman period and in the early years of the Republic of Turkey. She later joined the Ottoman women's movement, and became one of the Republican era's women to obtain political rights by becoming the first female member of the Istanbul Municipal Assembly in 1930. In 1934, she became one of the first women parliamentarians of the Republic of Turkey, representing Erzurum for three terms.

== Life ==
Elgün was born in 1882 in Istanbul. In 1911, she was appointed to the newly opened Istanbul İnas School after the Second Constitutional Era. She played an active role in social life as well as in the education sector. She was a clerk in the Association of Teal-i Nisvan, one of the earliest Ottoman women's organizations. During her tenure at İnas School, the Ministry of Education asked her to prepare a project that would lead the system in the renewal of education levels; she later proposed that students should take courses in white-colored classes. When her projects were rejected by the Ministry of Education, she resigned in 1914.

Between 1914 and 1917 she worked at the Pious Ministry (Evkaf Nazırlığı); she was involved in the rehabilitation and organization of the Foundation Schools established in Sultanahmet. In 1916, upon the invitation of the Governor of Syria, Djemal Pasha, she led the establishment of girls' teacher schools together with Halide Edib Adıvar in Syria, where she taught Turkish in Damascus, Jerusalem and Beirut. As the Ministry of Education, on the basis of centralizing all the education, took control of all the foundation schools, Elgün thought that there was no longer a task for her in the official school sector and left her position.

She later accepted the offer to restore an old school, which was established in Beyazıt in 1915, but had come to the point of disintegration when Mustafa Satı Bey resigned from his position as the school's principal. She re-established this institution in 1917 under the name of Fevziye High School

During World War I, Elgün volunteered for the Red Crescent and after the war, she spoke at various meetings in Istanbul to protest the occupation of Anatolia as chairman of the Association of Teachers during that period. On 23 May 1919, she was one of the speakers in a big rally in Sultanahmet Square. These meetings are considered as an era during which she turned into a political figure.

After the War of Independence, in order to protect the families of unaccompanied and unaided families in the war, she established a community with the name of Society for Helping Families of Martyrs; she also supported the National Campaign by hiding some of the war materials that were shipped to Anatolia via Bartın in the warehouses of the Feyziye School. The Society for Helping Families of the Martyrs was dissolved after the war ended; Nakiye Elgün resigned from her position at Fevziye School at the end of 1928.

After the war, Elgün took part in the opening of the Istanbul Branch of the Turkish Aeroplane Society, which was originally established in Ankara, and was the president of this branch. She also took part in the establishment of the Istanbul branch of the Economy and Savings Society and later worked at the Halkevleri Istanbul Branch. Meanwhile, she returned to her working life in 1929 and was appointed as the director of Istanbul Girls High School. However, when women were granted the right to be elected to the municipal and provincial councils in 1930, she quit her post and joined Istanbul General Assembly as a member from Beyoğlu. She was the first woman to be elected as a member of the Permanent Council of the Assembly. In the 1934 elections, she was again elected to the Istanbul General Assembly and the Standing Council.

On 5 December 1934, when women were given the right to vote and to be elected, Elgün participated actively in the celebrations organized by women. In the elections of 8 February 1935, she was nominated as a member of parliament by the Republican People's Party, and with 870 votes, she entered the parliament as a deputy from Erzurum in the fifth term.

On 24 March 1935, she was elected President of the Society at the Fourth Meeting of the Society for the Protection of Women. On 25 May 1935, she was elected as a member of the Central Executive Board of the Turkish Aeronautical Association and on 13 June 1936 she was elected as a member of the General Staff of the Institution in the General Assembly of the Child Protection Organization. In 1938, she assumed the task of chairman of the Topkapı Fukaraperver Society and continued her role in this position until her death.

She died on 23 March 1954 in Istanbul. An avenue in Osmanbey is named after her.
