= 7th Parliament of Turkey =

Grand National Assembly from 1943 to 1946

The 7th Grand National Assembly of Turkey existed from 28 February 1943 to 5 August 1946. There were 492 MPs in the parliament, all of which were the members of the Republican People's Party (CHP). But towards the end of the term some issued from CHP to form Democrat Party (DP)

== Main parliamentary milestones ==
Some of the important events in the history of the parliament are the following:

- 8 March 1943 – İsmet İnönü was reelected as the president of Turkey for the third time.
- 9 March 1943 – Şükrü Saracoğlu of CHP formed the 14th government of Turkey.
- 2 August 1944 – The parliament decided to suspend Turco-German relations
- 10 January 1945 – Law 4695: The text of the constitution was revised to replace non Turkish words with the Turkish equivalents.
- 10 January 1945 – Law 4696 Four Arabic month names were changed to Turkish month names.
- 23 February – Parliament approved declaration of war to Germany and Japan
- 12 June – Motion with four signatures (Turkish: Dörtlü takrir): An important step in Turkish democracy. Four CHP MPs called for a change in party regulations
- 15 August 1945 – The parliament approved the United Nations principle agreement.
- 20 November 1945 – President İsmet İnönü called for an opposition party
- 1 December 1945 – Celal Bayar, a former prime minister (1937–1939) announced that he'll found a new party.
- 7 January 1946 – Democrat Party (DP) was founded by Celal Bayar, Fuat Köprülü, Adnan Menderes and Refik Koraltan.
- 31 May 1946 – New election system (direct suffrage)
- 15 June 1946 – Law 4936: Universities became autonomous
- 21 July – General Elections

Preceded by 6th Parliament of Turkey	7th Parliament of Turkey; Abdülhalik Renda; 28 February 1943-5 August 1946	Succeeded by 8th Parliament of Turkey
