= 1946 Turkish general election =

- 21 July 1946

All 465 seats in the Grand National Assembly 233 seats needed for a majority
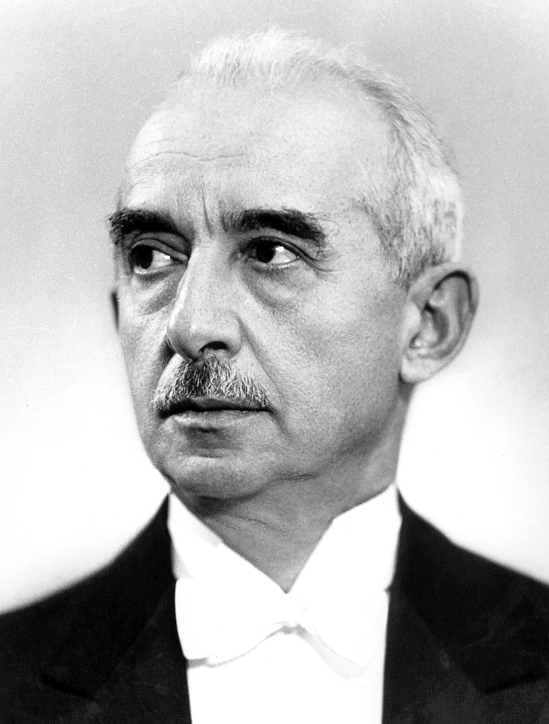

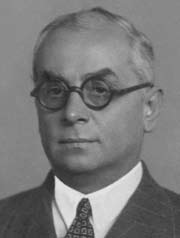
	First party	Second party
Leader	İsmet İnönü	Celâl Bayar
Party	CHP	DP
Seats won	395	64
Prime Minister before election
Şükrü Saracoğlu
CHP
Elected Prime Minister
Recep Peker
CHP

General elections were held in Turkey on 21 July 1946, the first multi-party general elections in the country's history. The multiple non-transferable vote electoral system was used. The result was a victory for the Republican People's Party, which won 395 of the 465 seats. This election was held on the basis of open voting, secret counting and majority system, with the exception of judicial supervision (open vote, secret classification). Due to these irregularities, it has also been referred to as a "fraudulent election".

== Results ==
Party	Seats
Republican People's Party	395
Democrat Party	64
Independents	6
Total	465
Source: Nohlen et al.
