= 1939 Turkish general election =

- 26 March 1939

All 429 seats in the Grand National Assembly 215 seats needed for a majority
- Turnout: 77.8%
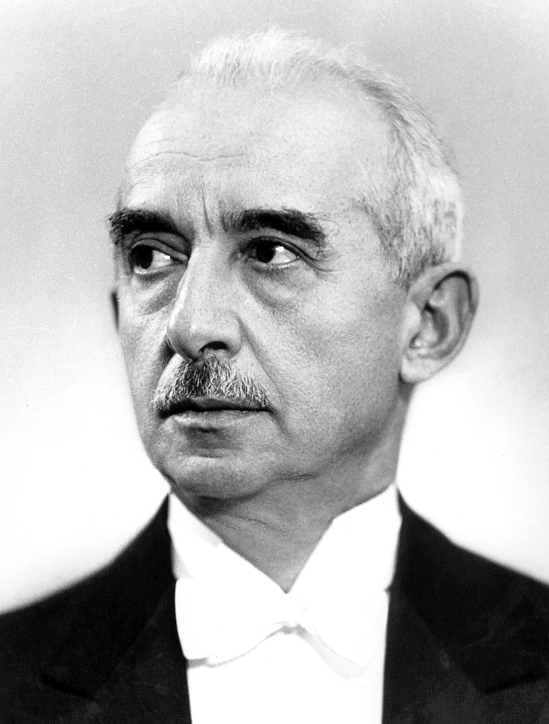
	First party
Leader	İsmet İnönü
Party	CHP
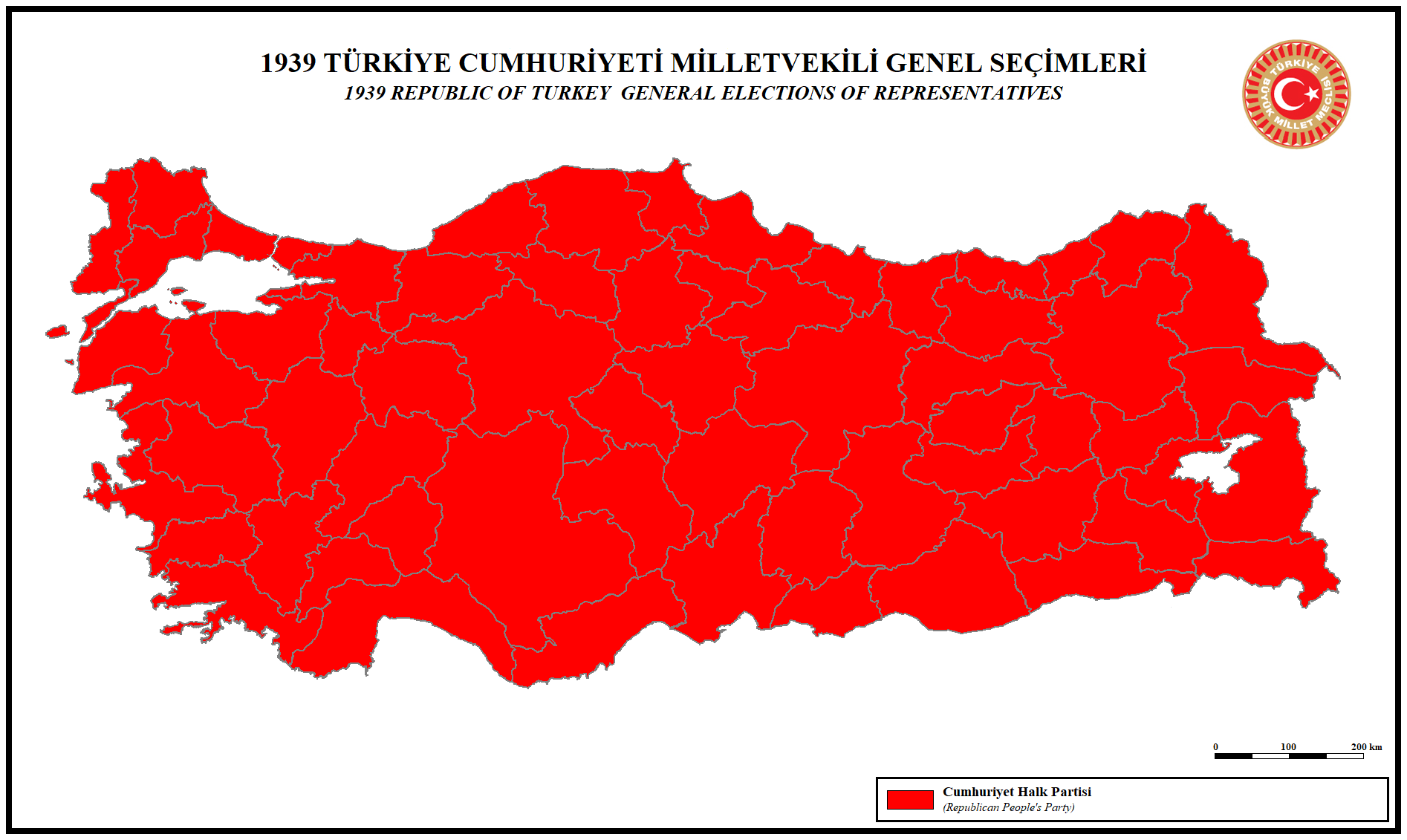
Prime Minister before election
Refik Saydam
CHP
Elected Prime Minister
Refik Saydam
CHP

General elections were held in Turkey on 26 March 1939. The Republican People's Party was the only party in the country at the time. Voter turnout was reported to be 77.8%.

== Electoral system ==
The elections were held under the Ottoman electoral law passed in 1908, which provided for a two-stage process. In the first stage, voters elected secondary electors (one for the first 750 voters in a constituency, then one for every additional 500 voters). In the second stage the secondary electors elected the members of the Turkish Grand National Assembly. A total of 429 members were elected.
