= 5th Parliament of Turkey =

Grand National Assembly from 1935 to 1939

The 5th Grand National Assembly of Turkey existed from 8 February 1935 to 3 April 1939. There were 444 MPs in the parliament all of which were the members of the Republican People's Party (CHP). 5th parliament was the first Turkish parliament in which women deputies were elected.

== Main parliamentary milestones ==
Some of the important events in the history of the parliament are the following:

- 1 March 1935 – Mustafa Kemal Atatürk was elected as the president of Turkey for the 4th time.
- 1 March 1935 – İsmet İnönü of CHP formed the 8th government of Turkey
- 27 May 1935 – Law 2739 : The official holidays and vacations were established. Sunday became the rest day (instead of Friday).
- 31 July 1936 - Law 3056 : Montreux Convention (20 July) approved by the parliament
- 25 October 1937 – Celal Bayar of CHP formed the 9th government of Turkey
- 10 November 1938 – President Mustafa Kemal Atatürk died.
- 11 November 1938 – İsmet İnönü was elected as the second president of Turkey.
- 11 November 1938 – Celal Bayar formed the 10th government of Turkey
- 25 January 1939 – Refik Saydam of CHP formed the 11th government of Turkey
- 26 March 1939 – General Elections

== See also ==
- Women in Turkish politics

Preceded by 4th Parliament of Turkey	5th Parliament of Turkey; Abdülhalik Renda; 8 January – 3 April 1939	Succeeded by 6th Parliament of Turkey
