= Osman Bölükbaşı =

Turkish politician (1911-2002)

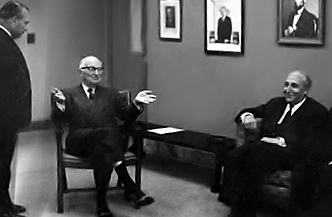
- Harry S. Truman meets with Osman Bölükbaşı in Washington, DC (April 12, 1949).

Personal details
- Born: 1913 Hasanlar village, Mucur Kaza, Kırşehir Sanjak, Ankara Vilayet, Ottoman Empire
- Died: February 6, 2002 (aged 88–89) Ankara, Turkey
- Party: 1962-72 Nation Party; 1958-62 Republican Peasants' Nation Party; 1954-58 Republican Nation Party; 1948-53 Nation Party; 1946-47 Democrat Party
- Spouse: Mediha (Büyükyağcıoğlu) Bölükbaşı
- Children: Deniz Bölükbaşı, Fatma Gül Bölükbaşı, Gönül Hürriyet Bölükbaşı (son) grandchildren = Ebru Erbay, Cem Aykan, Tamer Tezgel, Zeynep Bölükbaşı
- Education: Mathematics
- Alma mater: Istanbul High School; University of Nancy, France
- Occupation: Politician

Osman Bölükbaşı (1913 – February 6, 2002) was a Turkish politician and political party leader.

== Early life ==
He was born at Hasanlar village of the former Mucur district in 1913.

He completed his secondary education at the Istanbul High School. He studied Mathematics at the University of Nancy in France graduating in 1937.

Returned home in 1938, Bölükbaşı began working as assistant to Fatin Gökmen at the Kandilli Observatory in Istanbul. In 1940, he took a teacher post in the Haydarpaşa High School, where he served until 1946.

== Political career ==
Introduced to Mehmet Fuat Köprülü and Celal Bayar, the co-founders of the Democrat Party (DP) by Fatin Gökmen, Osman Bölükbaşı entered politics in 1946 becoming a party member. He was appointed Inspector General of the DP. However, he left the party in 1947 along with some other members due to a controversy over the intention of making harsh politics against the Republican People's Party (CHP).

On July 20, 1948, he co-founded with Fevzi Çakmak and some others the Nation Party (MP). Bölükbaşı was arrested in 1949 on allegation for conspiracy against Celal Bayar, leader of the DP, and İsmet İnönü, leader of the CHP. After a brieft while, he was released.

Bölükbaşı entered the parliament representing his hometown Kırşehir as the only deputy of his party following the 1950 general elections. His party was banned in 1953 on the grounds of anti-secularism politics. Osman Bölükbaşı subsequently formed the Republican Nation Party (CMP) with the founders of the closed party. The new established party won five seats in the parliament at the 1954 general elections. All the five deputies were from Kırşehir, the hometown of Bölükbaşı.

The ruling Democrat Party changed the province status of Kırşehir to district and subordinated it to Nevşehir Province. Kırşehir remained district for the following period of three years. During this time, Bölükbaşı harshly criticized the government. Kırşehir's province status was restored in June 1957, however, the district of his village Hasanlar and three other districts remained within Nevşehir Province. Bölükbaşı was arrested in July 1957 on grounds of insulting the parliament.

In the 1957 general elections, he secured a seat in the parliament along with other three party colleagues from the CMP. Because still imprisoned, he took the required oath of office at the Tenth Ward of the Ankara Central Prison in pajamas before the inmates.

To strengthen opposition to the ruling Democratic Party, the CMP merged with the Turkey Peasants' Party (TKP) to form the Republican Peasants' Nation Party (CKMP) in 1958 under the leadership of Bölükbaşı. He was sentenced to ten months in prison in 1959.

Following the 1960 military coup, Bölükbașı participated at the Constitutional Assembly in 1961 representing the CKMP. However, he rejected in an uncompromising manner to join the coalition government after the 1961 general elections. Bölükbaşı left the CKMP along with 28 other deputies in June 1962, and re-established the National Party (MP) upon his party's joining the 2nd coalition government of İsmet İnönü. He was named leader of the new party. In 1965, his party took part in the coalition government of Suat Hayri Ürgüplü. Bölükbaşı did not take office in the cabinet, and also openly criticized the government. In February 1969, the general assembly of his former party CKMP approved the renaming of the party to today's Nationalist Movement Party (MHP).

== Later years ==
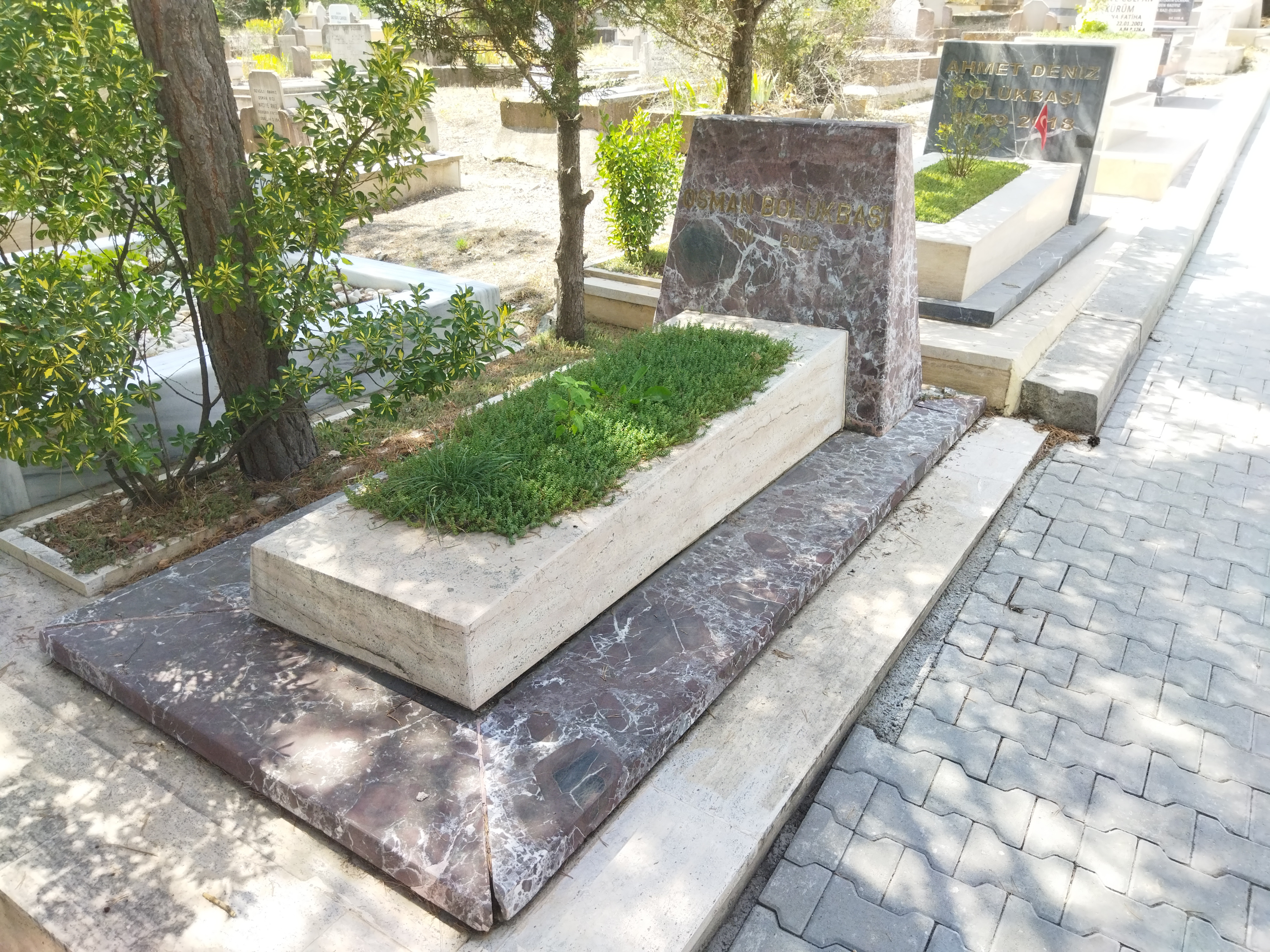
Grave of Osman Bölükbaşı in Cebeci Asri Cemetery, Ankara

Osman Bölükbaşı stepped down from the post of the Nation Party's leadership in 1972. The reason of his quitting was the conflict of opinion within the party, and also finally injustice done by party members to Hasan Koçdemir, his close friend in active politics. On September 9, 1973, Bölükbaşı resigned from his post as the deputy of Ankara, he was holding since 1961, and left active politics five weeks before the 1973 general elections.

He was nicknamed "Anatolian Storm" Turkish: Anadolu Fırtınası). For chatterers, the saying "Bölükbaşı gab" was coined. His mass meetings during the electoral campaigns were attended by crowds, who, however, did not always vote for him.

Osman Bölükbaşı died of respiratory failure at the university hospital in Ankara on February 6, 2002, and was laid to rest two days later at the Cebeci Asri Cemetery following a memorial ceremony held at the parliament building and later a religious funeral service at the Kocatepe Mosque in Ankara. He was survived by his wife Mediha Bölükbaşı (née Büyükyağcıoğlu) and his son Ahmet Deniz Bölükbaşı, who is a former ambassador and former MP from the Nationalist Movement Party (MHP), his daughters, Fatma Gül Bölükbaşı, Hürriyet Gönül Bölükbaşı and grandchildren, Ebru Erbay, Cem Aykan, Tamer Tezgel and Zeynep Bölükbaşı.
