= Grand National Assembly of Turkey =

Unicameral legislature of Turkey

Coordinates: 39°54′42″N 32°51′04″E

Grand National Assembly of Turkey Türkiye Büyük Millet Meclisi
- 28th Parliament of Turkey
- Seal of the Grand National Assembly

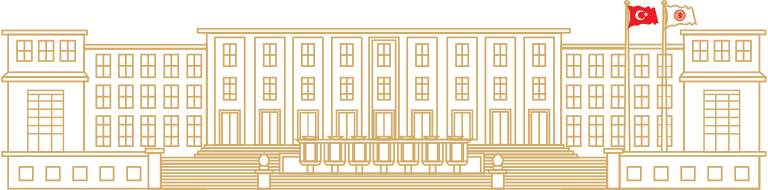
- Logo of the Grand National Assembly

Type
- Type: Unicameral

History
- Founded: 23 April 1920; 106 years ago
- Preceded by: General Assembly

Leadership
- Speaker: Numan Kurtulmuş, AK Party since 7 June 2023
- Deputy Speakers: Yusuf Beyazıt, AK Party; Tekin Bingöl, YENİ Party; Celal Adan, MHP; Pervin Buldan, DEM Party
- Government Group Leader: Abdullah Güler, AK Party since 3 June 2023
- Main Opposition Group Leader: Özgür Özel, YENİ Party since 24 July 2026

Structure
- Seats: Speaker (non-voting); 600
- Political groups: Government (67th cabinet of Turkey) (281): AK Party (281); Supported by (51): MHP (46); HÜDA PAR (4); DSP (1); Main Opposition (90): YENİ Party (90); Opposition (158): DEM Party (56); CHP (44); İYİ Party (26); New Path (20) (Note: DEVA Party (7); SAADET (8); CHP (1); YRP (1); Independent (3)); TİP (3); YRP (3); DBP (2); EMEP (2); DP (1); SAADET (1); Independent (12): Independent (12); Vacant (8): Vacant (8)
- Committees: 19 committees
- Length of term: 5 years
- Authority: Constitution of Turkey
- Salary: ₺310,332 monthly

Elections
- Voting system: Closed list proportional representation (D'Hondt method with a 7% electoral threshold)
- First election: 1920
- Last election: 14 May 2023
- Next election: On or before 7 May 2028
- Redistricting: Supreme Election Council

Motto
- Egemenlik kayıtsız şartsız Milletindir; Sovereignty unconditionally belongs to the Nation

Meeting place
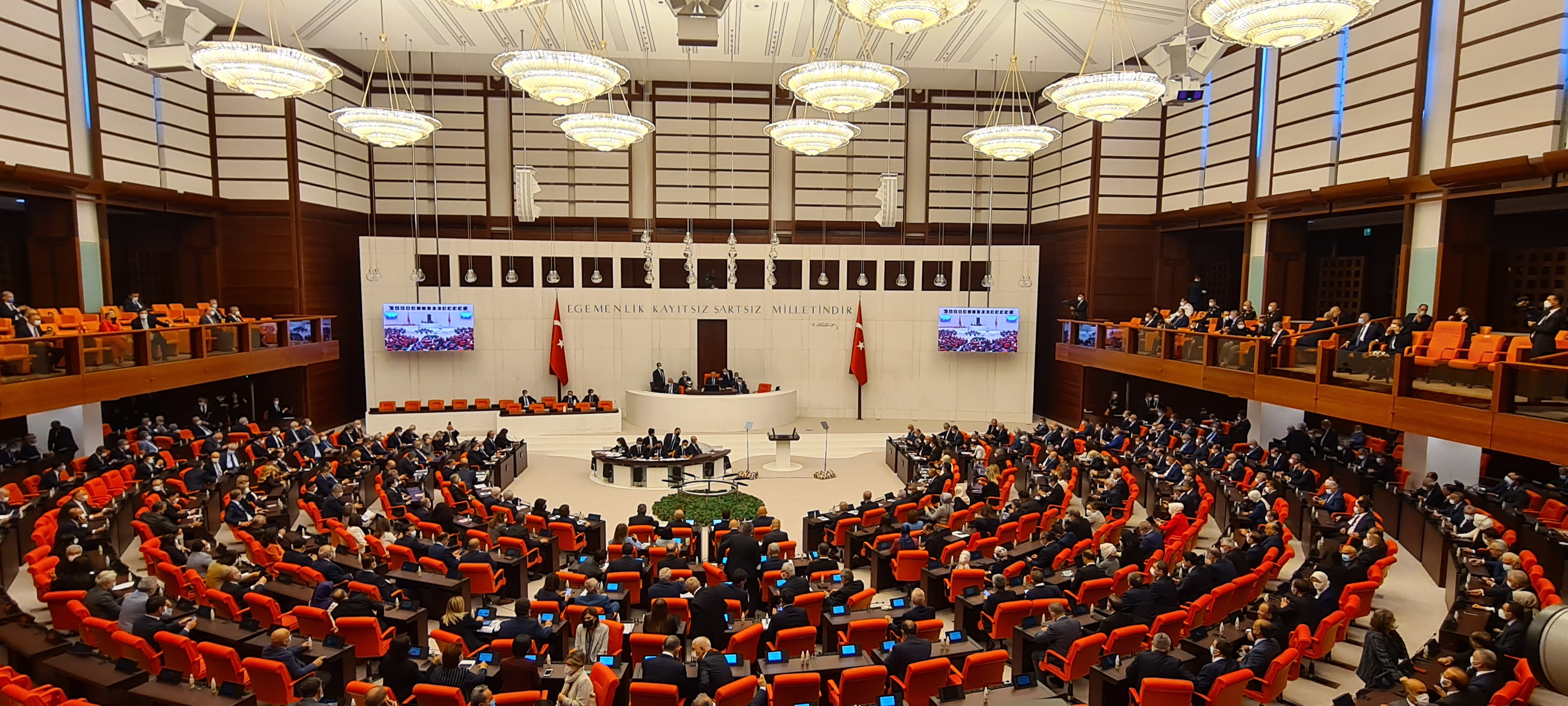
- General Assembly Hall; Grand National Assembly of Turkey; 06543, Bakanlıklar; Ankara, Turkey

Website
- global.tbmm.gov.tr

Constitution
- Constitution of Turkey

The Grand National Assembly of Turkey (Note: Turkish: Türkiye Büyük Millet Meclisi (TBMM) [tyɾcije byjyc milːet medʒlisi], also referred to as Parlamento (lit. 'Parliament' in Turkish) or archaically Kamutay) is the unicameral legislative branch of the Turkish government. It is the sole body given the legislative prerogatives by the unitary Turkish Constitution.

== Composition ==
There are 600 members of parliament (deputies) who are elected for a five-year term by the D'Hondt method, a party-list proportional representation system, from 87 electoral districts which represent the 81 administrative provinces of Turkey (Istanbul and Ankara are divided into three electoral districts whereas İzmir and Bursa are divided into two each because of their large populations). To avoid a hung parliament and its excessive political fragmentation, from 1982 to 2022, a party must have won at least 10% of the national vote to qualify for representation in the parliament, but in 2022 this was reduced to 7%. As a result of the 10% threshold, only two parties won seats in the legislature after the 2002 elections and three in 2007. The 2002 elections saw every party represented in the previous parliament ejected from the chamber and parties representing 46.3% of the voter turnout were excluded from being represented in parliament. This threshold has been criticized, but a complaint with the European Court for Human Rights was turned down.

Independent candidates may also run and can be elected without needing a threshold.

=== Speaker of the parliament ===
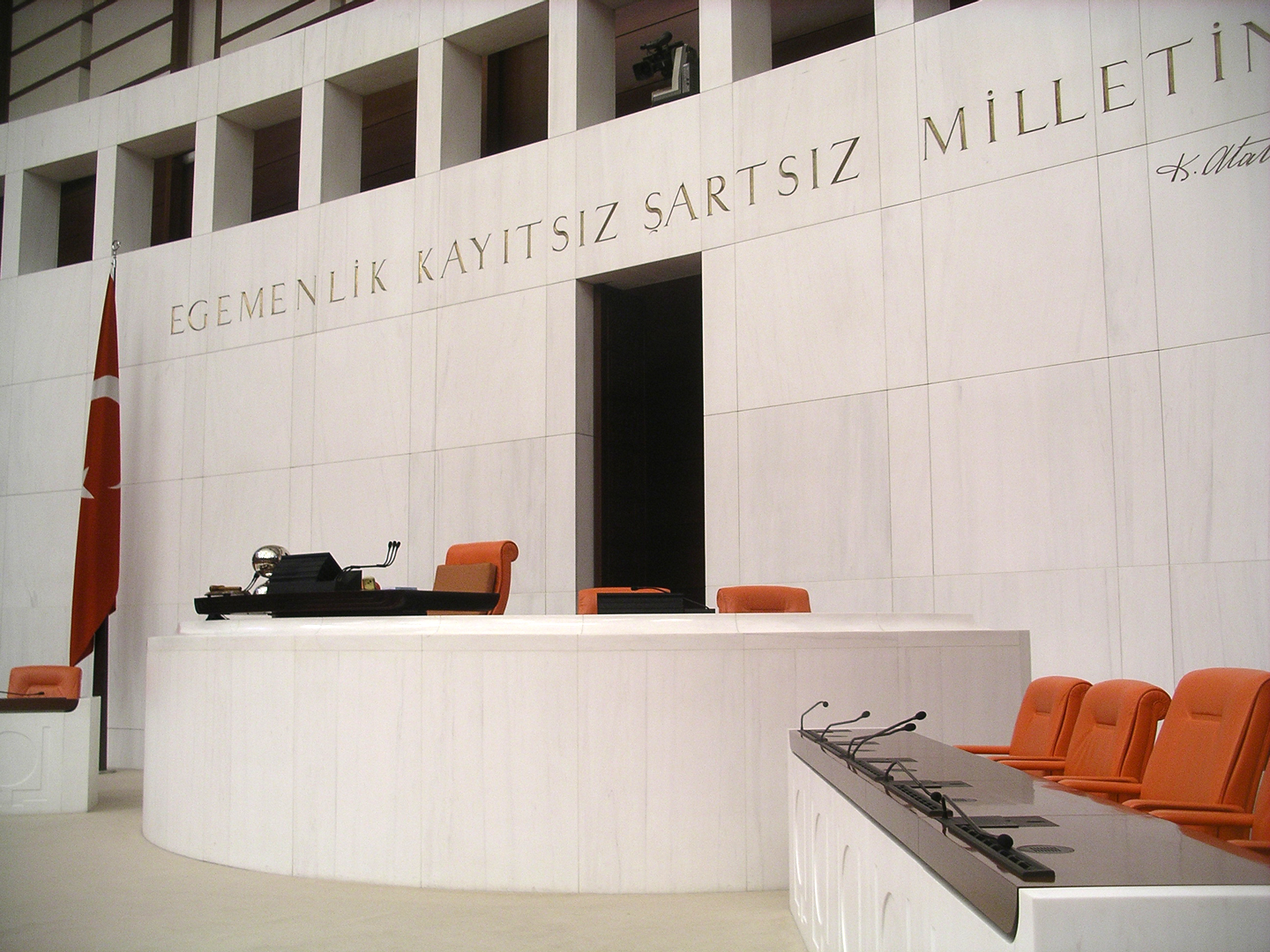
The chair of the Speaker of the Parliament

A new term in the parliament began on 2 June 2023, after the 2023 general election. Devlet Bahçeli MHP temporarily served as the speaker, as it is customary for the oldest member of the TBMM to serve as speaker during a hung parliament. Numan Kurtulmuş was elected after the snap elections on 7 June 2023.

=== Languages ===
The parliament's minutes are translated into the four languages: Arabic, Russian, English and French, but not in the Kurdish language which is the second most spoken native language in Turkey. Though phrases in the Kurdish language can be permitted, whole speeches remain forbidden.

=== Members (since 1999) ===
- Members elected in 1999 (21st Parliament)
- Members elected in 2002 (22nd Parliament)
- Members elected in 2007 (23rd Parliament)
- Members elected in 2011 (24th Parliament)
- Members elected in June 2015 (25th Parliament)
- Members elected in November 2015 (26th Parliament)
- Members elected in 2018 (27th Parliament)
- Members elected in 2023 (28th Parliament)

=== Parliamentary groups ===
Parties who have at least 20 deputies may form a parliamentary group. Currently there are seven parliamentary groups at the GNAT: AK Party, YENİ Party, DEM, MHP, CHP, Good Party, and New Path.

=== Committees ===
==== Specialized committees ====
1. Justice Committee (27 members)
2. Constitution Committee (26 members)
3. Committee for Harmonization with the European Union (27 members)
4. Public Works, Zoning, Transportation, and Tourism Committee (26 members)
5. Environment Committee (26 members)
6. Foreign Affairs Committee (25 members)
7. Digital Media Committee (17 members)
8. Petitions Committee (12 members)
9. Security and Intelligence Committee (17 members)
10. Internal Affairs Committee (26 members)
11. Committee for the Inspection of Human Rights (25 members)
  1. Subcommittee for the Inspection of Islamophobia and Racism (10 members)
  2. Subcommittee for the Inspection of the Rights of Convicts and Detainees
  3. Migration and Integration Subcommittee (10 members)
  4. Children's Rights Subcommittee (10 members)
12. Committee for Equal Opportunities for Women and Men (26 members)
13. State-owned Enterprises Committee (35 members)
14. National Education, Culture, Youth, and Sports committee (26 members)
15. National Defense Committee (26 members)
16. Planning and Budgeting Committee (30 members)
17. Health, Family, Employment, and Social Affairs Committee (27 members)
18. Industry, Commerce, Energy, Natural Resources, Information, and Technology Committee (26 members)
19. Agriculture, Forestry, and Rural Works Committee (26 members)

==== Parliamentary research committees ====
These committees are one of auditing tools of the Parliament. The research can begin upon the demand of the Government, political party groups or a minimum of 20 MPs. The duty is assigned to a committee whose number of members, duration of work and location of work is determined by the proposal of the Parliamentary Speaker and the approval of the General Assembly.

Seal of the Turkish Parliament (Türkiye Büyük Millet Meclisi)

==== Parliamentary investigation committees ====
These committees are established if any investigation demand re the president, vice president, and ministers occur and approved by the General Assembly through hidden voting.

==== International committees ====
1. Parliamentary Assembly of the Organization for Security and Co-operation in Europe (8 members)
2. NATO Parliamentary Assembly (18 members)
3. Parliamentary Assembly of the Council of Europe (18 members)
4. Turkey — European Union Joint Parliamentary Committee (25 members)
5. Parliamentary Union of the OIC Member States (5 members)
6. Asian Parliamentary Assembly (5 members)
7. Parliamentary Assembly of the Union for the Mediterranean (7 members)
8. Inter-parliamentary Union (9 members)
9. Parliamentary Assembly of the Black Sea Economic Cooperation (9 members)
10. Parliamentary Assembly of the Mediterranean (5 members)
11. Parliamentary Assembly of Turkic States (9 members)
12. Parliamentary Assembly of the Economic Cooperation Organization (5 members)
13. Parliamentary Assembly of the Southeast European Cooperation Process (6 members)
14. Andean Parliament (observer) (3 members)
15. Latin American Parliament (observer) (3 members)

MPs can attend more than one committee if not a member of Petitions Committee or Planning and Budgeting Committee. Members of those committees can not participate in any other committees. On the other hand, MPs do not have to work for a committee either. Number of members of each committee is determined by the proposal of the Advisory Council and the approval of the General Assembly.

Sub committees are established according to the issue that the committee receives. Only State-owned Enterprises (SOEs) Committee has constant sub committees that are specifically responsible for a group of SOEs.

Committee meetings are open to the MPs, the Ministers' Board members and the Government representatives. The MPs and the Ministers' Board members can talk in the committees but can not make amendments proposals or vote. Every MP can read the reports of the committees.

NGOs can attend the committee meetings upon the invitation of the committee therefore volunteer individual or public participation is not available. Media, but not the visual media, can attend the meetings. The media representatives are usually the parliamentary staff of the media institutions. The committees can prevent the attendance of the media with a joint decision.

== Current composition ==
The 28th Parliament of Turkey took office on 2 June 2023, following the ratification of the results of the general election held on 14 May 2023. The composition of the 28th Parliament, is shown below.

== Parliament Building ==
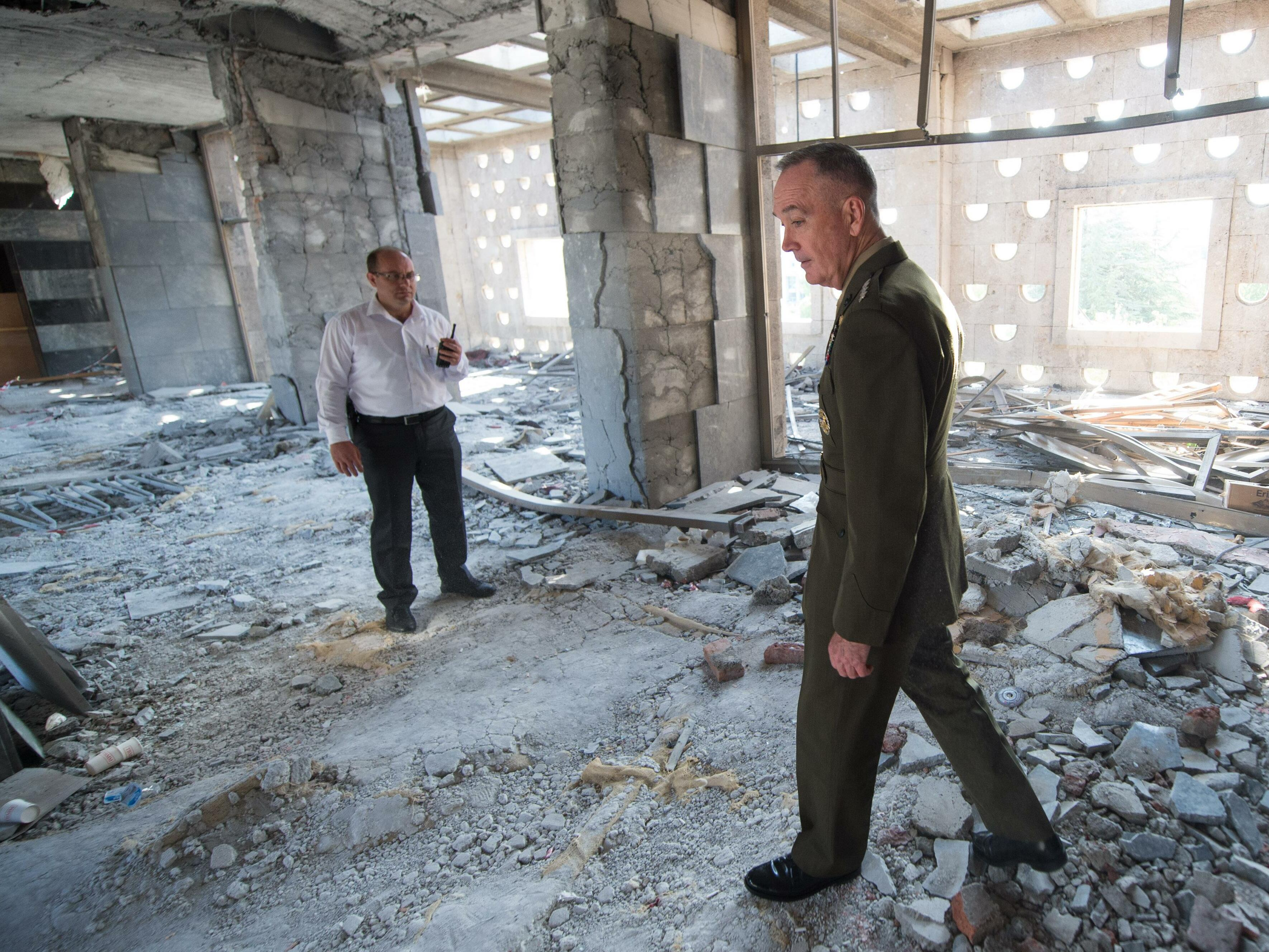
Damage to the Parliament Building after the failed 2016 coup

The current Parliament Building is the third to house the nation's parliament. The building which first housed the Parliament was converted from the Ankara headquarters of the Committee of Union and Progress. Designed by architect Hasip Bey, it was used until 1924 and is now used as the locale of the War of Independence Museum, the second building which housed the Parliament was designed by architect Vedat Tek (1873–1942) and used from 1924 to 1960. It is now been converted as the Republic Museum. The Grand National Assembly is now housed in a modern and imposing building in the Bakanlıklar neighborhood of Ankara. The monumental building's project was designed by architect and professor Clemens Holzmeister (1886–1993). The building was depicted on the reverse of the Turkish 50,000 lira banknotes of 1989–1999. The building was hit by airstrikes three times during the 2016 Turkish coup d'état attempt, suffering noticeable damage. It went through a renovation in the summer of 2016.

== History ==
It was founded in Ankara on 23 April 1920 amid the National Campaign. This constitution had founded its pre-government known as 1st Executive Ministers of Turkey (Commitment Deputy Committee) in May 1920. The parliament was fundamental in the efforts of Great Leader Mustafa Kemal Atatürk, founder of Turkey, and his colleagues to found a new government out of the remnants of the Ottoman Empire.

Turkey has had a history of parliamentary government before the establishment of the current national parliament. These include attempts at curbing absolute monarchy during the Ottoman Empire through constitutional monarchy, as well as establishments of caretaker national assemblies immediately prior to the declaration of the Republic of Turkey in 1923 but after the de facto dissolution of the Ottoman Empire earlier in the decade.

=== Parliamentary practice before the Republican era ===
==== Ottoman Empire ====
There were two periods of parliamentary governance during the Ottoman Empire. The First Constitutional Era lasted for only two years, elections being held only twice. After the first elections, there were a number of criticisms of the government due to the Russo-Turkish War, 1877–1878 by the representatives, and the assembly was dissolved and an election called on 28 June 1877. The second assembly was also dissolved by the Sultan Abdul Hamid II on 14 February 1878, the result being the return of absolute monarchy with Abdul Hamid II in power and the suspension of the Ottoman constitution of 1876, which had come with the democratic reforms resulting in the First Constitutional Era.

The Second Constitutional Era began on 23 July 1908 with the Young Turk Revolution. The constitution that was written for the first parliament included control of the sultan on the public and was removed during 1909, 1912, 1914 and 1916, in a session known as the "declaration of freedom". Most of the modern parliamentary rights that were not granted in the first constitution were granted, such as the abolition of the right of the Sultan to deport citizens that were claimed to have committed harmful activities, the establishment of a free press, a ban on censorship. Freedom to hold meetings and establish political parties was recognized, and the government was held responsible to the assembly, not to the sultan.

During the two constitutional eras of the Ottoman Empire, the Ottoman parliament was called the General Assembly of the Ottoman Empire and was bicameral. The upper house was the Senate of the Ottoman Empire, the members of which were selected by the sultan. The role of the Grand Vizier, the centuries-old top ministerial office in the empire, transformed in line with other European states into one identical to the office of a prime minister, as well as that of the speaker of the Senate. The lower chamber of the General Assembly was the Chamber of Deputies of the Ottoman Empire, the members of which were elected by the general public.

==== Establishment of the National Assembly ====
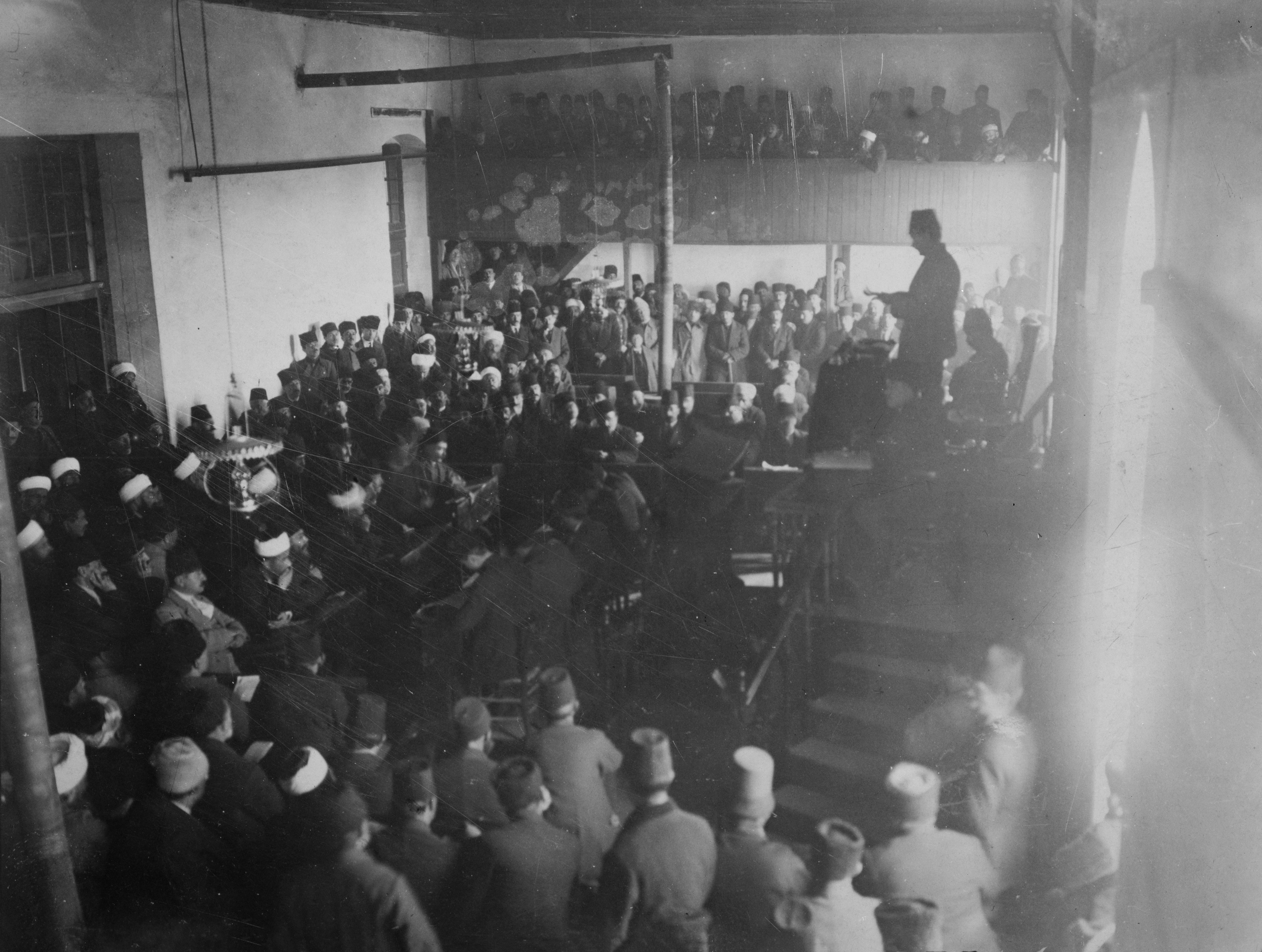
Address of Mustafa Kemal Pasha, the President of the Turkish Grand National Assembly to the members of parliament during the second legislative period of the assembly (1 March 1921)

After World War I, the victorious Allied Powers sought the dismemberment of the Ottoman Empire through the Treaty of Sèvres. The sovereign existence of the Turkish nation was to be eliminated under these plans, except for a small region. Nationalist Turkish sentiment rose in the Anatolian peninsula, engendering the establishment of the Turkish national movement. The political developments during this period have made a lasting impact which continues to affect the character of the Turkish nation. During the Turkish War of Independence, Mustafa Kemal put forth the notion that there would be only one way for the liberation of the Turkish people in the aftermath of World War I, namely, through the creation of an independent, sovereign Turkish state. The Sultanate was abolished by the newly founded parliament in 1922, paving the way for the formal proclamation of the republic that was to come on 29 October 1923.

==== Transition to Ankara ====
Mustafa Kemal Atatürk was the first speaker of the Grand National Assembly.

Mustafa Kemal, in a speech he made on 19 March 1920 announced that "an Assembly will be gathered in Ankara that will possess extraordinary powers" and communicated how the members who would participate in the assembly would be elected and the need to realise elections, at the latest, within 15 days. He also stated that the members of the dispersed Ottoman Chamber of Deputies could also participate in the assembly in Ankara, to increase the representative power of the parliament. These elections were held as planned, in the style of the elections of the preceding Chamber of Deputies, in order to select the first members of the new Turkish assembly. This Grand National Assembly, established on national sovereignty, held its inaugural session on 23 April 1920. From this date until the end of the Turkish War of Independence in 1923, the provisional government of Turkey was known as the Government of the Grand National Assembly.

=== Republican era ===
==== 1923–1945 ====
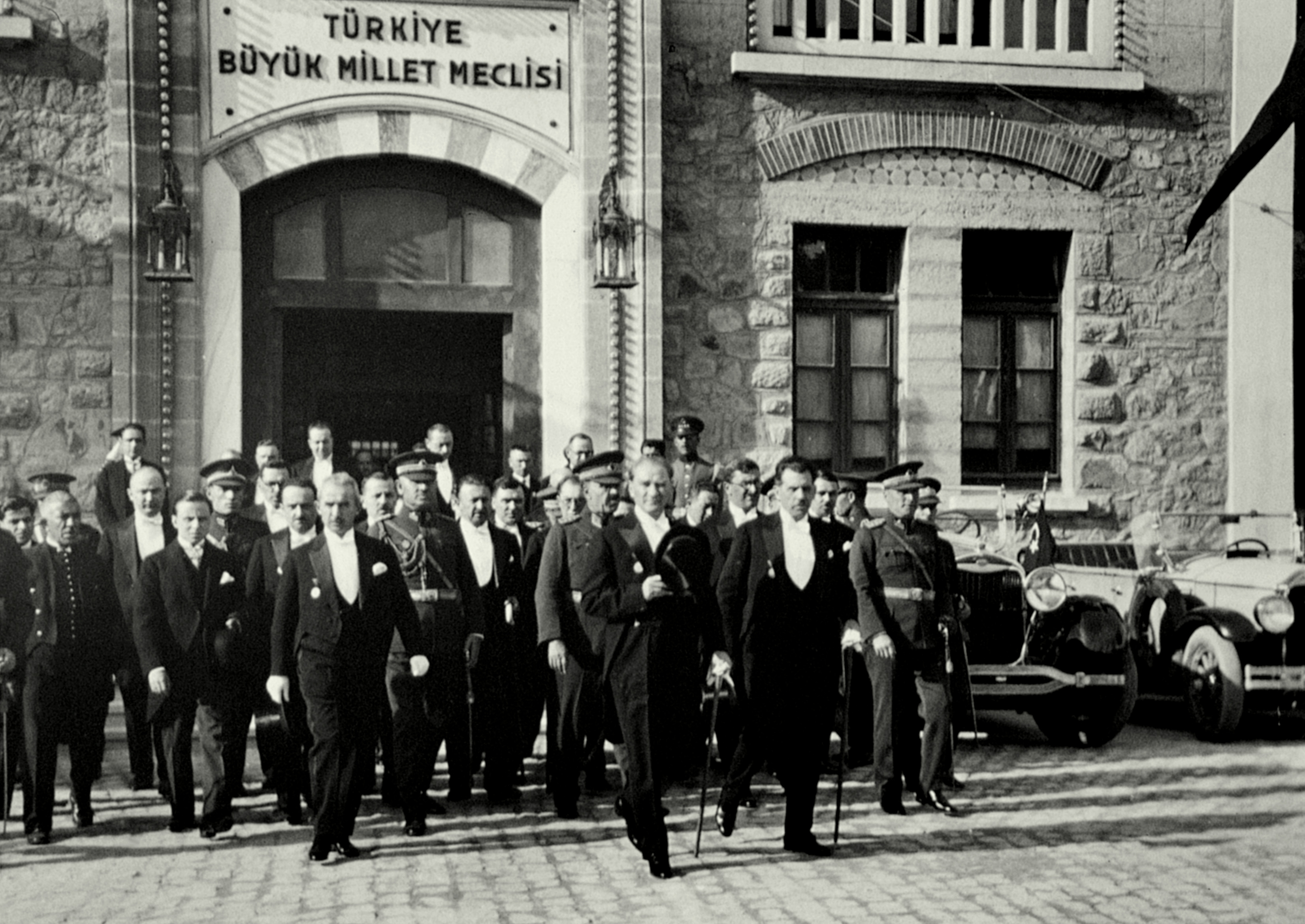
President Atatürk and his colleagues leaving the building of the Grand National Assembly of Turkey (today the Republic Museum) after a meeting for the seventh anniversary of the foundation of the Republic of Turkey (1930)

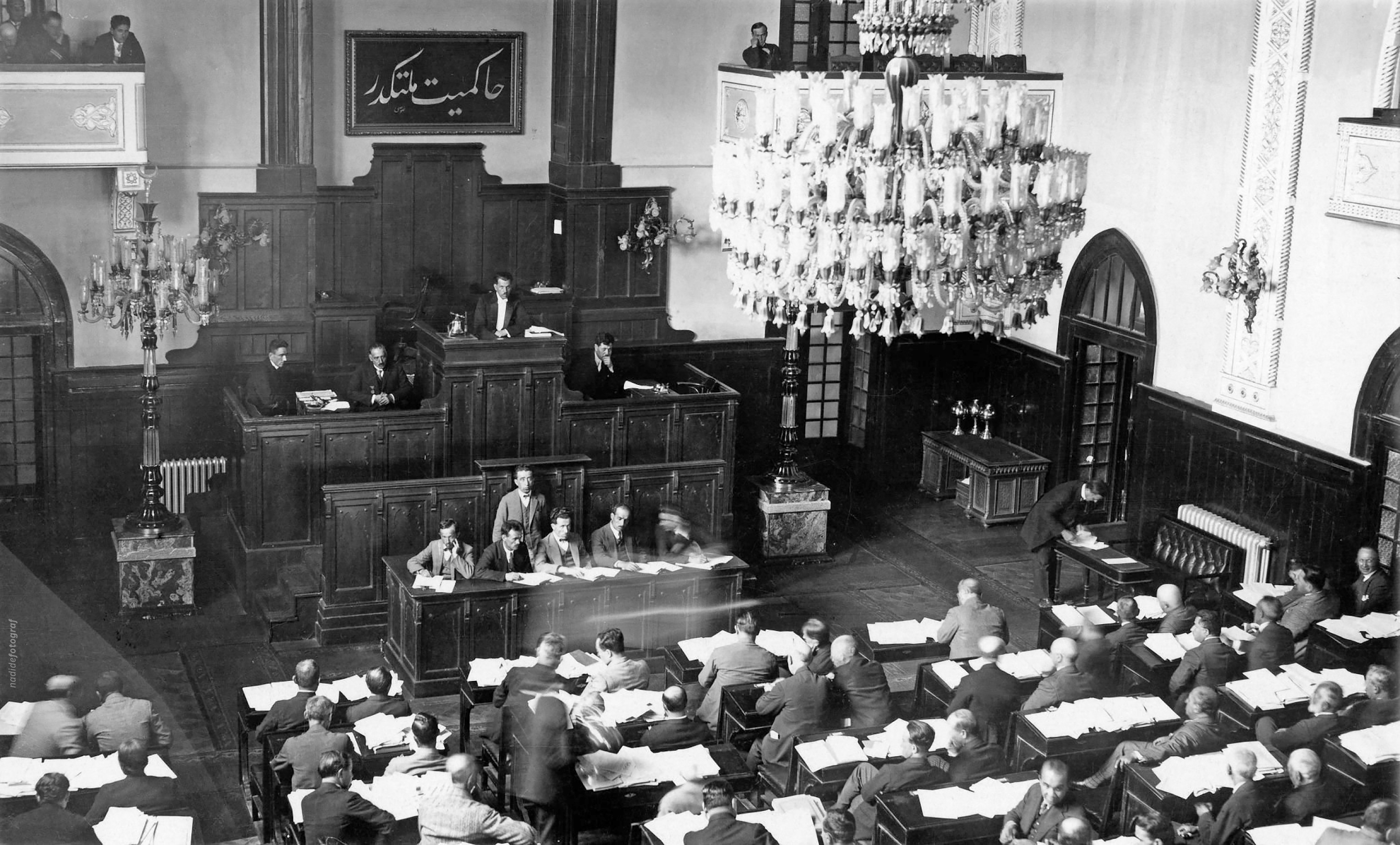
The session of the Grand National Assembly in 1928 (In the 2nd Parliament)

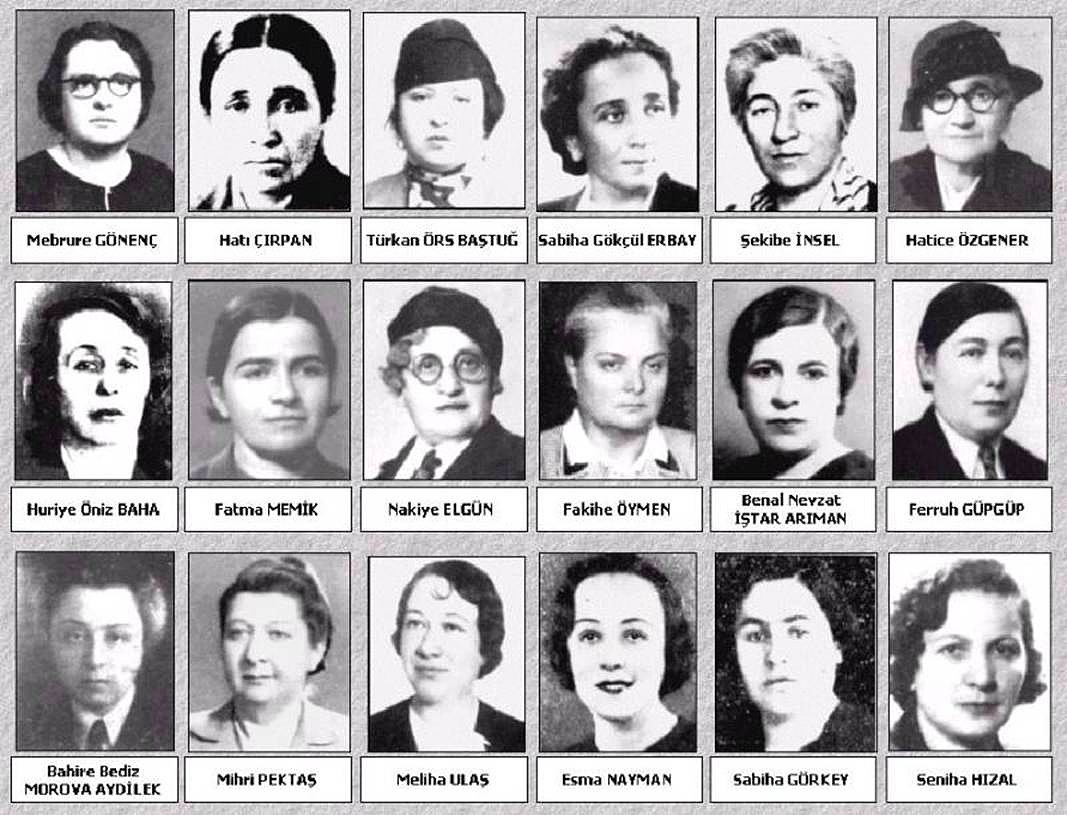
Eighteen female deputies joined the Turkish Parliament with the 1935 general elections.

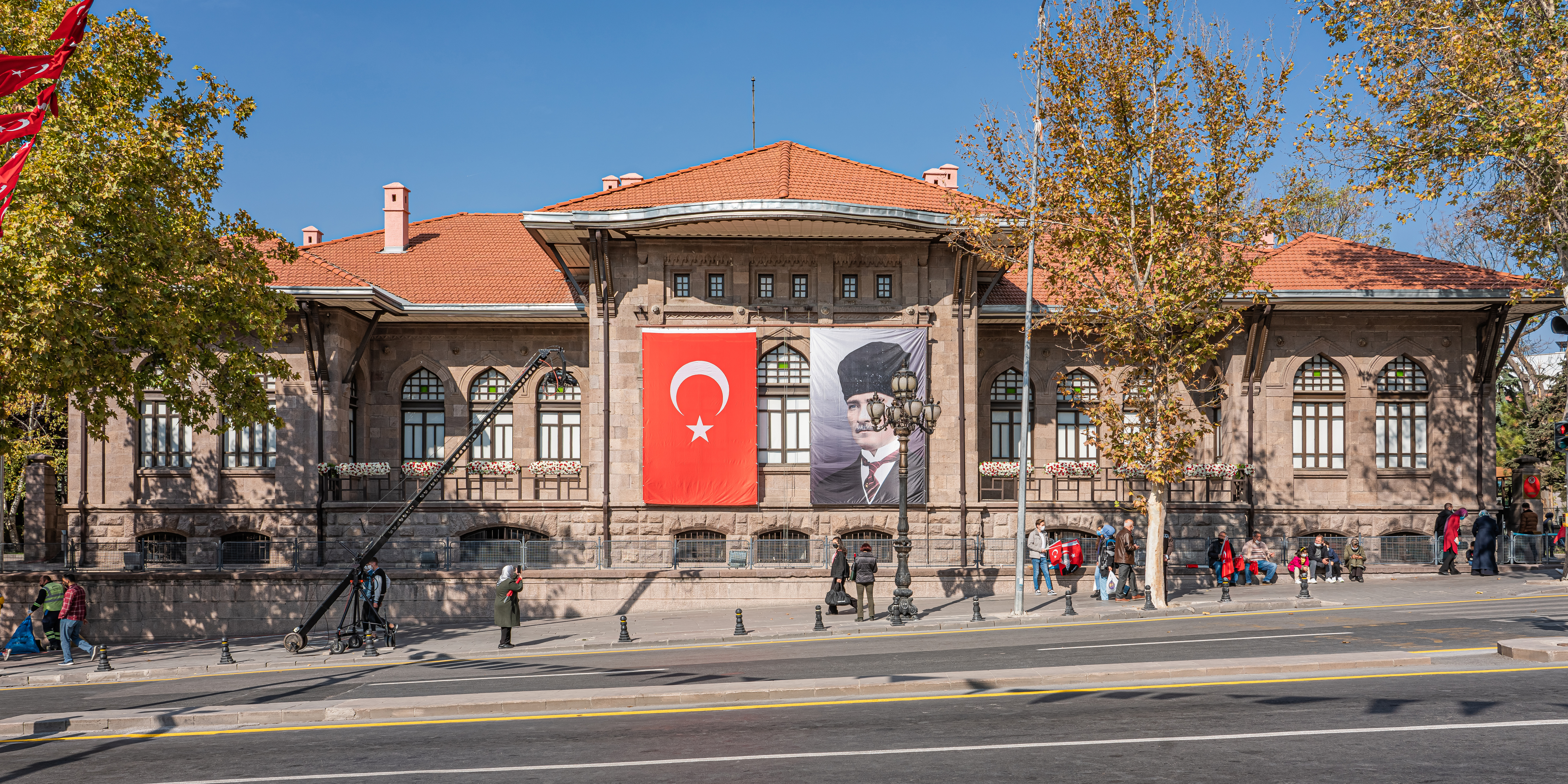
The War of Independence Museum (Kurtuluş Savaşı Müzesi), housed in the first Turkish Grand National Assembly building in the Ulus district of Ankara

The first trial of multi-party politics, during the republican era, was made in 1924 by the establishment of the Terakkiperver Cumhuriyet Fırkası (Progressive Republican Party) at the request of Mustafa Kemal, which was closed after several months. Following a 6-year one-party rule, after the foundation of the Serbest Fırka (Liberal Party) by Ali Fethi Okyar, again at the request of Mustafa Kemal, in 1930, some violent disorders took place, especially in the eastern parts of the country. The Liberal Party was dissolved on 17 November 1930 and no further attempt at a multiparty democracy was made until 1945.

==== 1945–1960 ====
The multi-party period in Turkey was resumed by the founding of the National Development Party (Milli Kalkınma Partisi), by Nuri Demirağ, in 1945. The Democrat Party was established the following year, and won the general elections of 1950; one of its leaders, Celal Bayar, becoming President of the Republic and another, Adnan Menderes, Prime Minister.

==== 1960–1980 ====
After the a military coup on 27 May 1960, Prime Minister Adnan Menderes, President Celal Bayar, and all the ministers and members of the Assembly were arrested. The Assembly was closed. The Committee of National Unity, CNU (Milli Birlik Komitesi), assumed all the powers of the Assembly by a provisional constitution and began to run the country. Executive power was used by ministers appointed by the CNU.

The members of the CNU began to work on a new and comprehensive constitution. The Constituent Assembly (Kurucu Meclis), composed of members of the CNU and the members of the House of Representatives, was established to draft a new constitution on 6 January 1961. The House of Representatives consisted of those appointed by the CNU, representatives designated by two parties of that time (CHP and Republican Villagers National Party, RVNP), and representatives of various professional associations.

The constitutional text drafted by the Constituent Assembly was presented to the voters in a referendum on 9 July 1961, and was accepted by 61.17% of the voters. The 1961 Constitution, the first prepared by a Constituent Assembly and the first to be presented to the people in a referendum, included innovations in many subjects.

The 1961 Constitution stipulated a typical parliamentarian system. According to the Constitution, Parliament was bicameral. The legislative power was vested in the House of Representatives and the Senate. while the executive authority was vested in the President and the Council of Ministers. The Constitution envisaged a Constitutional Court.

The 1961 Constitution regulated fundamental rights and freedom, including economic and social rights, over a wide spectrum and adopted the principles of a democratic social state and the rule of law. The 1961 Constitution underwent many comprehensive changes after the military memorandum of 12 March 1971, but continued to be in force until the military coup of 1980.

==== 1980–2018 ====
The country underwent another military coup on 12 September 1980. The Constitution was suspended and political parties were dissolved. Many politicians were forbidden from entering politics again. The military power ruling the country established a "Constituent Assembly", as had been done in 1961. The Constituent Assembly was composed of the National Security Council and the Advisory Assembly. Within two years, the new constitution was drafted and was presented to the referendum on 7 November 1982. Participation in the referendum was 91.27%. As a result, the 1982 Constitution was passed with 91.37% of the votes.

The greatest change brought about by the 1982 Constitution was the unicameral parliamentary system. The number of MPs were 550 members. The executive was empowered and new and more definite limitations were introduced on fundamental rights and freedoms. Also, a 10% electoral threshold was introduced. Except for these aspects, the 1982 Constitution greatly resembled the 1961 Constitution.

The 1982 Constitution, from the time it was accepted until the present time, has undergone many changes, especially the "integration laws", which have been introduced within the framework of the European Union membership process, and which has led to a fundamental evolution.

==== 2018–present ====
After the 2017 constitutional referendums, the first general election of the Assembly was under a presidential system, with an executive president who has the power to renew the elections for the Assembly and vice versa. Following the referendum, the number of MPs increased from 550 to 600. Furthermore, due to separation of powers, members of the cabinet cannot introduce laws anymore. This task is left to the parliamentarians. In line with this change, the seats for the members of the cabinet have been removed from the parliament. These seats were originally located on the left side of the Parliament Speaker.

In 2022, at the initiative of the ruling AK Party and its main political ally MHP, the national electoral threshold for a party to enter parliament was lowered from 10 to 7 percent.

=== Changes since 2023 ===
#	Party	Leader	Position	Group chairperson	Start	Current	Change	Status	National affiliation
1	AK PARTY; Justice and Development Party	Recep Tayyip Erdoğan	Right-wing; Conservatism	Abdullah Güler	268 / 600	281 / 600	▲13	Government	People's Alliance
2	YENİ PARTY; New Party	Özgür Özel	Center-left; Social democracy	Özgür Özel	0 / 600	90 / 600	▲90	Main opposition	—
3	DEM PARTİ; Peoples' Equality and Democracy Party	Tülay Hatimoğulları & Tuncer Bakırhan	Center-left to left-wing Green politics Regionalism	Tuncer Bakırhan	61 / 600	56 / 600	▼5	Opposition	Labour and Freedom Alliance
4	MHP; Nationalist Movement Party	Devlet Bahçeli	Far-right; Ultranationalism	Devlet Bahçeli	50 / 600	46 / 600	▼4	Confidence and supply	People's Alliance
5	CHP; Republican People's Party	Kemal Kılıçdaroğlu	Center-left; Kemalism	Faik Öztrak	169 / 600	44 / 600	▼125	Opposition	—
6	İYİ PARTİ; Good Party	Müsavat Dervişoğlu	Center-right; Turkish nationalism	Müsavat Dervişoğlu	43 / 600	26 / 600	▼17	Opposition	—
7	NEW PATH; New Path	İzzettin Küçük	Center-right to right-wing Conservatism	Mehmet Emin Ekmen	0 / 600	20 / 600	▲20	Opposition	—
Parties without parliamentary groups (Note: Parties need at least 20 members to form parliamentary groups.)
8	HÜDA PAR; Free Cause Party	Zekeriya Yapıcıoğlu	Far-right; Kurdish-Islamic synthesis	—	0 / 600	4 / 600	▲4	Confidence and supply	—
9	YENİDEN REFAH; New Welfare Party	Fatih Erbakan	Far-right; Millî Görüş	—	5 / 600	3 / 600	▼2	Opposition	—
10	TİP; Workers' Party of Turkey	Erkan Baş	Far-left; Socialism	—	4 / 600	3 / 600	▼1	Opposition	Labour and Freedom Alliance
11	DBP; Democratic Regions Party	Çiğdem Kılıçgün Uçar & Keskin Bayındır	Left-wing; Regionalism	—	0 / 600	2 / 600	▲2	Opposition	Labour and Freedom Alliance
12	EMEP; Labour Party	Seyit Aslan	Far-left; Hoxhaism	—	0 / 600	2 / 600	▲2	Opposition	Labour and Freedom Alliance
13	DP; Democrat Party	Gültekin Uysal	Center-right; Liberal conservatism	—	0 / 600	1 / 600	▲1	Opposition	—
14	SAADET; Felicity Party	Mahmut Arıkan	Right-wing; Millî Görüş	—	0 / 600	1 / 600	▲1	Opposition	—
15	DSP; Democratic Left Party	Önder Aksakal	Center-left; Ecevitism	—	0 / 600	1 / 600	▲1	Confidence and supply	—
	Independent			—	0 / 600	12 / 600	▲12		
Total					600 / 600	592 / 600	▼8		

== Historical composition ==
=== Single-party period ===
ARMHC / CHP / Ind.
1923	332 / 1
1927	335
1931	287 / 30
1935	401 / 27
1939	470
1943	492

=== Beginning of the multi-party period ===
CHP / HP / Ind. / DP (1946) / MP (1948) / CMP / CKMP
1946	395 / 6 / 64
1950	69 / 1 / 416 / 1
1954	31 / 2 / 503 / 5
1957	178 / 4 / 424 / 4

=== After the 1960 coup ===
TİP (1961) / TBP / CHP / Ind. / CGP / YTP / DP (1970) / AP / MP (1962) / CKMP / MHP / MSP
1961	173 / 65 / 158 / 54
1965	14 / 134 / 1 / 19 / 240 / 31 / 11
1969	2 / 8 / 143 / 13 / 15 / 6 / 256 / 6 / 1
1973	1 / 185 / 6 / 13 / 45 / 149 / 3 / 48
1977	213 / 4 / 3 / 1 / 189 / 16 / 24

=== After the 1980 coup ===
DSP / HP / SHP / CHP / Ind. / MDP / ANAP / DYP / MHP / RP / FP
1983	117 / 71 / 211
1987	99 / 292 / 59
1991	7 / 88 / 115 / 178 / 62
1995	76 / 49 / 132 / 135 / 158
1999	136 / 3 / 86 / 85 / 129 / 111

=== After the 2002 election ===
TİP (2017) / HDP / DEM / CHP / Ind. / İYİ / MHP / AK Party / YRP
2002	178 / 9 / 363
2007	112 / 26 / 71 / 341
2011	135 / 35 / 53 / 327
2015.06	80 / 132 / 80 / 258
2015.11	59 / 134 / 40 / 317
2018	67 / 146 / 43 / 49 / 295
2023	4 / 61 / 169 / 43 / 50 / 268 / 5

== List of foreign leaders addressing the Turkish Parliament ==
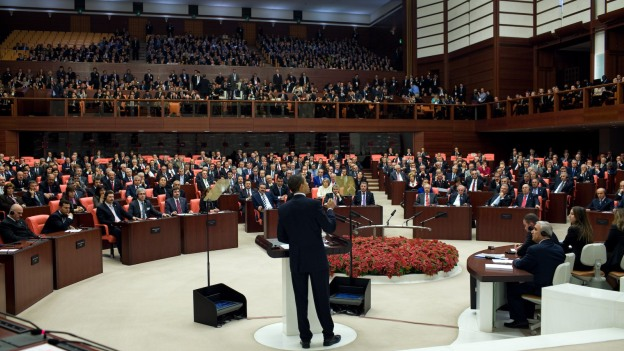
US president Barack Obama addressing the Turkish Parliament in 2009

The General Assembly of the Turkish Grand National Assembly hosts foreign dignitaries from time to time. However, the protocol here may vary depending on the situation. For the foreign guest to make a speech a decision of the General Assembly is required.

	Year	Country	Name	Title
1	15 April 1955	Iraq	Abdul-Wahab Mirjan	Chairman of the Iraqi Parliament
2	16 July 1956	Pakistan	Iskander Mirza	President of Pakistan
3	1 November 1958	Iran	Serdar Fahi̇r Hi̇kmat	Chairman of the Iranian Parliamentary Delegation
4	24 April 1959	Indonesia	Sukarno	President of Indonesia
5	1 April 1964	West Germany	Eugen Gerstenmaier	President of the Bundestag
6	5 January 1965	USSR	Nikolay Podgorny	General Secretary of the Communist Party of the USSR
7	25 March 1965	Tunisia	Habib Bourguiba	President of Tunisia
8	5 December 1984	China	Lei Jieqiong	Member of National People's Congress of the People's Republic of China
9	23 April 1985	Japan	Susumu Kobayashi	Member of the House of Representatives of Japan
10	23 April 1986	Council of Europe	Oliver James Flanagan	Deputy President of the Parliamentary Assembly of the Council of Europe
11	23 April 1987	Luxembourg	Astrid Lulling	Member of Chamber of Deputies of Luxembourg
12	23 April 1988	Malaysia	Mohamed Zahir Ismail	Speaker of the Dewan Rakyat
13	23 April 1989	Switzerland	Hubert Reymond	President of the Swiss Council of States
14	23 April 1990	Malaysia	Ahmad Urai Abang Muhideen	President of the Senate of Malaysia
15	23 April 1991	Hungary	Kelemen András	Hungarian Deputy Minister of Social Security
16	12 May 1992	Bosnia and Herzegovina	Muhamed Čengić	Deputy Prime Minister of Bosnia and Herzegovina
17	26 June 1992	Azerbaijan	Abulfaz Elchibey	President of Azerbaijan
18	23 April 1992	Kyrgyzstan	Serikbolsyn Abdildin	Chairman of the Supreme Council of Kazakhstan
19	10 June 1993	Northern Cyprus	Rauf Denktaş	President of the Turkish Republic of Northern Cyprus
20	9 February 1994	Azerbaijan	Heydar Aliyev	President of Azerbaijan
21	23 April 1994	Northern Cyprus	Ayhan Halit Acarkan	Speakers of the Assembly of the Republic
22	13 October 1994	Kyrgyzstan	Askar Akayev	President of Kyrgyzstan
23	23 April 1995	Croatia	Katica Ivanišević	Speaker of the Chamber of Counties of Croatia
24	4 April 1996	Georgia	Eduard Shevardnadze	President of Georgia
25	21 January 1997	Northern Cyprus	Rauf Denktaş	President of the Turkish Republic of Northern Cyprus
26	29 April 1997	Romania	Emil Constantinescu	President of Romania
27	6 May 1997	Azerbaijan	Heydar Aliyev	President of Azerbaijan
28	29 July 1997	Bulgaria	Petar Stoyanov	President of Bulgaria
29	12 February 1998	Albania	Rexhep Meidani	President of Albania
30	23 April 1998	Northern Cyprus	Rauf Denktaş	President of the Turkish Republic of Northern Cyprus
31	30 June 1998	India	Ganti Mohana Chandra Balayogi	Speaker of the Parliament of India
32	15 July 1999	Northern Cyprus	Rauf Denktaş	President of the Turkish Republic of Northern Cyprus
33	15 November 1999	United States of America	Bill Clinton	President of the United States of America
34	7 March 2000	Jordan	Abdullah II	King of Jordan
35	14 April 2000	Poland	Aleksander Kwasniewski	President of Poland
36	23 April 2000	Turkmenistan	Sahat Muradow	Speaker of the Parliament of Turkmenistan
37	23 November 2000	Ukraine	Leonid Kuchma	President of Ukraine
38	13 March 2001	Azerbaijan	Heydar Aliyev	President of Azerbaijan
39	6 March 2003	Northern Cyprus	Rauf Denktaş	President of the Turkish Republic of Northern Cyprus
40	15 January 2004	European Union	Romano Prodi	President of the European Commission
41	20 January 2004	Pakistan	Pervez Musharraf	President of Pakistan
42	2 March 2004	European Union	Pat Cox	President of the European Parliament
43	14 April 2004	Azerbaijan	Ilham Aliyev	President of Azerbaijan
44	15 April 2004	Northern Cyprus	Rauf Denktaş	President of the Turkish Republic of Northern Cyprus
45	3 December 2004	European Union	Josep Borrell Fontelles	President of the European Parliament
46	9 November 2005	Council of Europe	René van der Linden	President of the Parliamentary Assembly of the Council of Europe
47	13 November 2007	Palestine	Mahmud Abbas	President of the Palestinian National Authority
48	13 November 2007	Israel	Shimon Peres	President of Israel
49	10 April 2008	European Union	Jose Manuel Barroso	President of the European Commission
50	6 November 2008	Azerbaijan	Ilham Aliyev	President of Azerbaijan
51	6 April 2009	United States of America	Barack Hussein Obama	President of the United States of America
52	12 May 2009	Portugal	Anibal Cavaco Silva	President of Portugal
53	22 October 2009	Kazakhstan	Nursultan Nazarbayev	President of Kazakhstan
54	29 June 2010	Indonesia	Susilo Bambang Yudhoyono	President of Indonesia
55	19 October 2010	Germany	Christian Wulff	President of Germany
56	7 December 2010	Pakistan	Yusuf Raza Gilani	Prime Minister of Pakistan
57	24 November 2011	European Union	Jerzy Buzek	President of the European Parliament
58	10 January 2012	Council of Europe	Mevlüt Çavuşoğlu	President of the Parliamentary Assembly of the Council of Europe
59	12 January 2012	Kyrgyzstan	Almazbek Atambayev	President of the Kyrgyz Republic
60	10 December 2012	Palestine	Mahmud Abbas	President of Palestine
61	30 May 2013	Tunisia	Moncef Marzouki	President of Tunisia
62	16 August 2024	Palestine	Mahmud Abbas	President of Palestine
63	10 April 2025	Indonesia	Prabowo Subianto	President of Indonesia

== Picture gallery ==
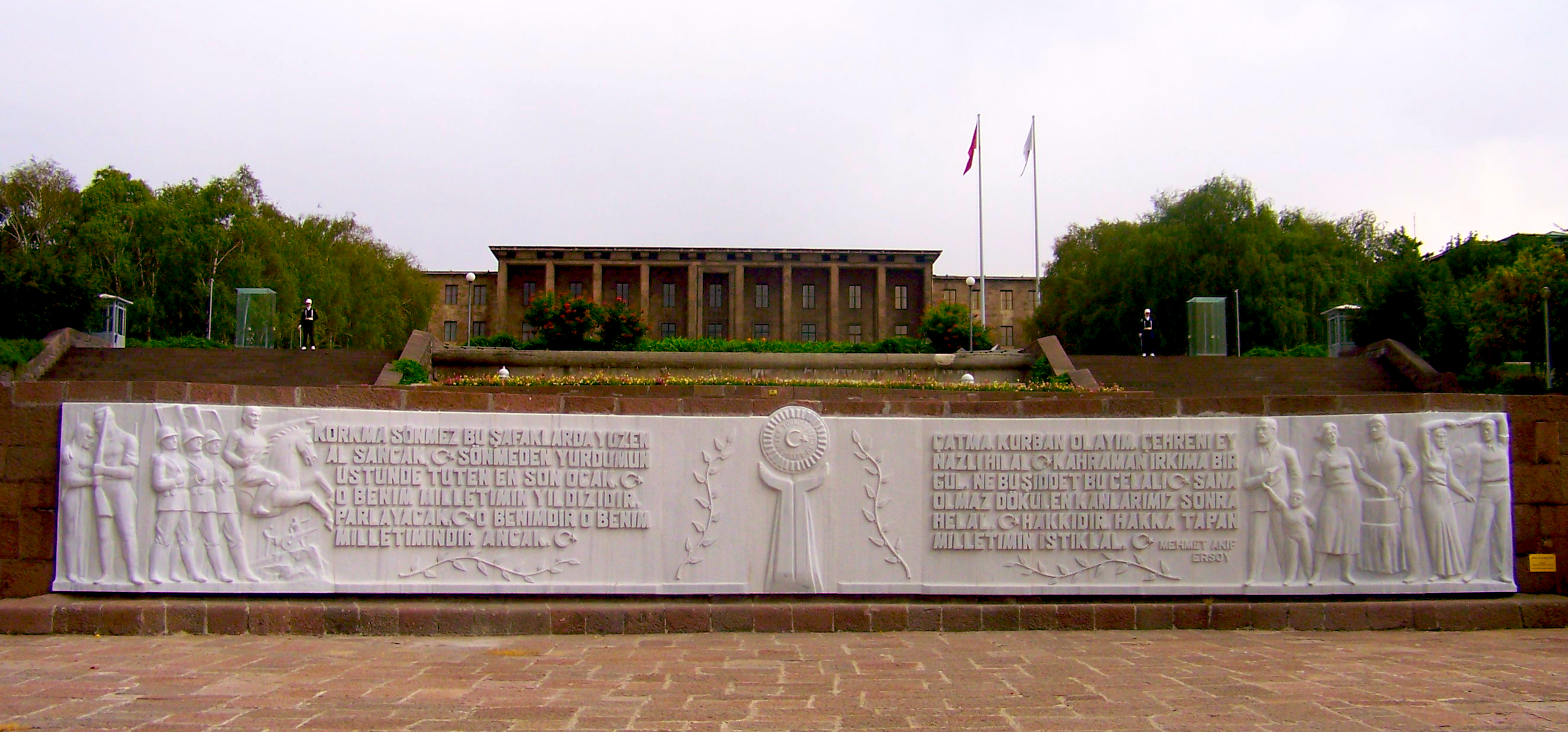
The current TBMM front facade

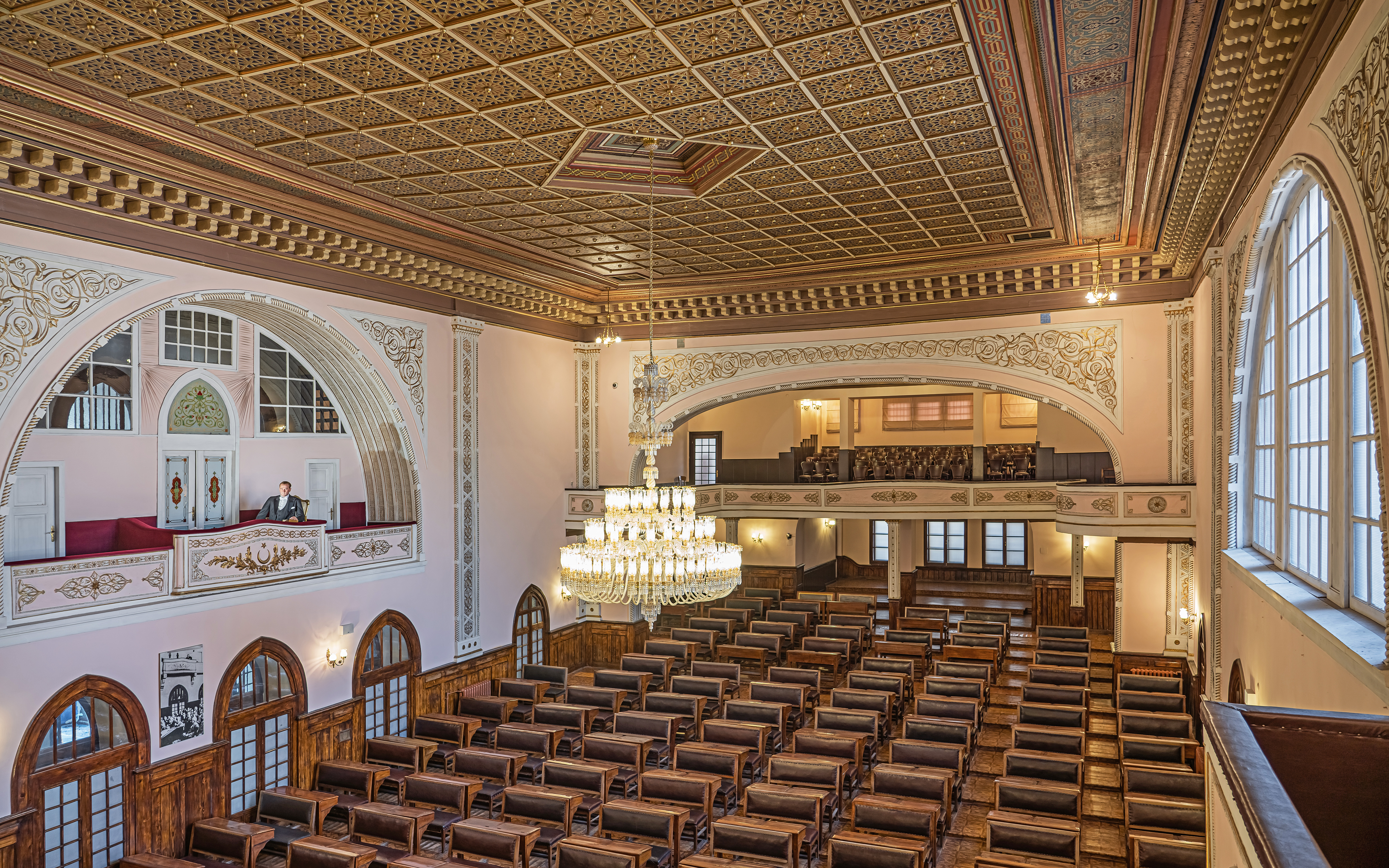
The old TBMM

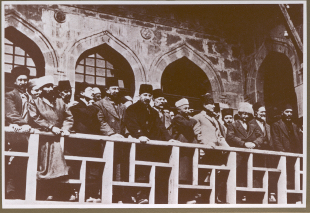
Balcony of the old TBMM

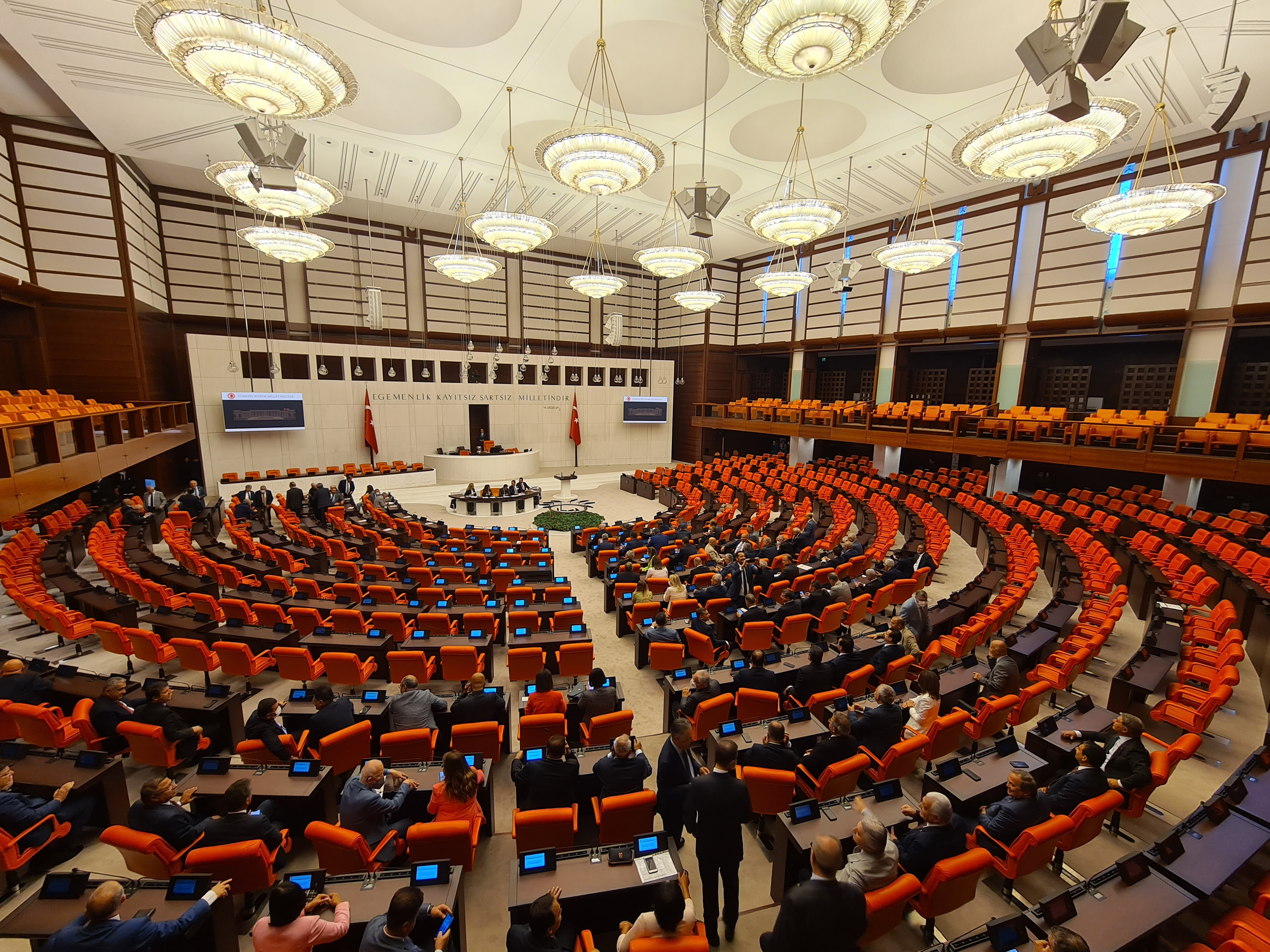
The General Assembly is the meeting place of the TBMM.

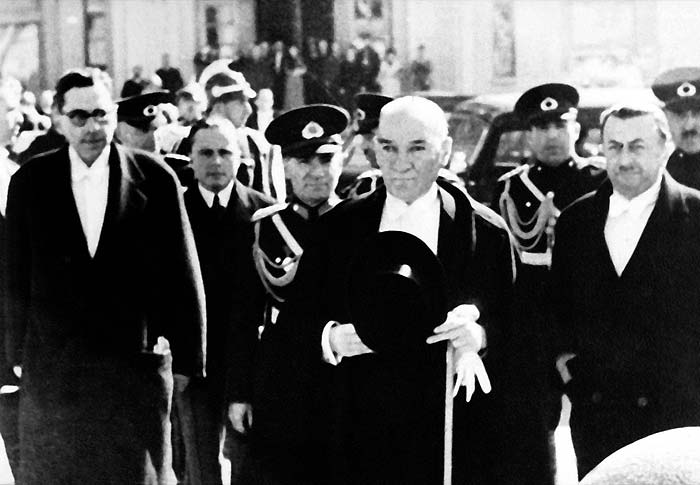
President Atatürk entering the TBMM

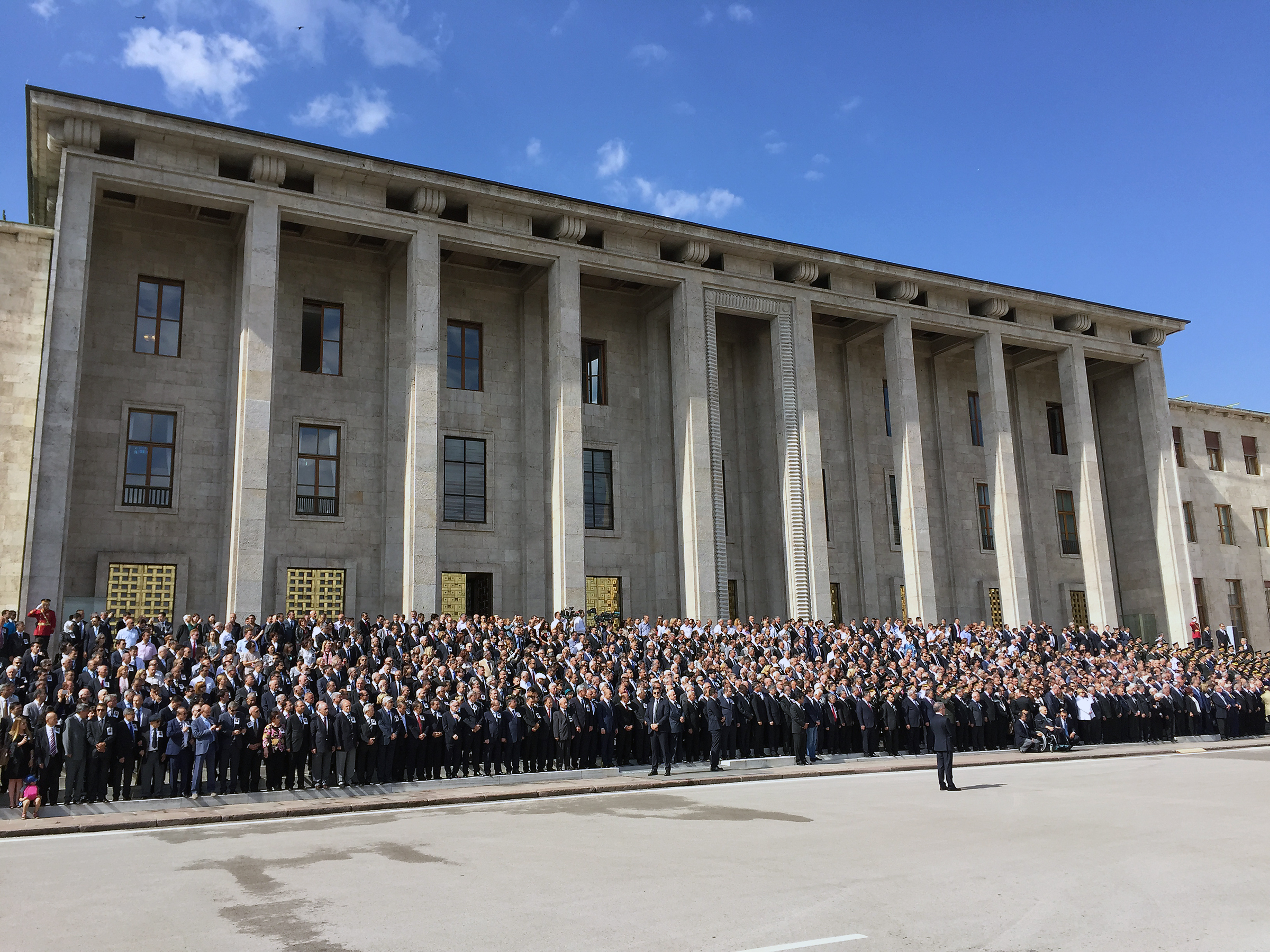
Funeral of President Demirel

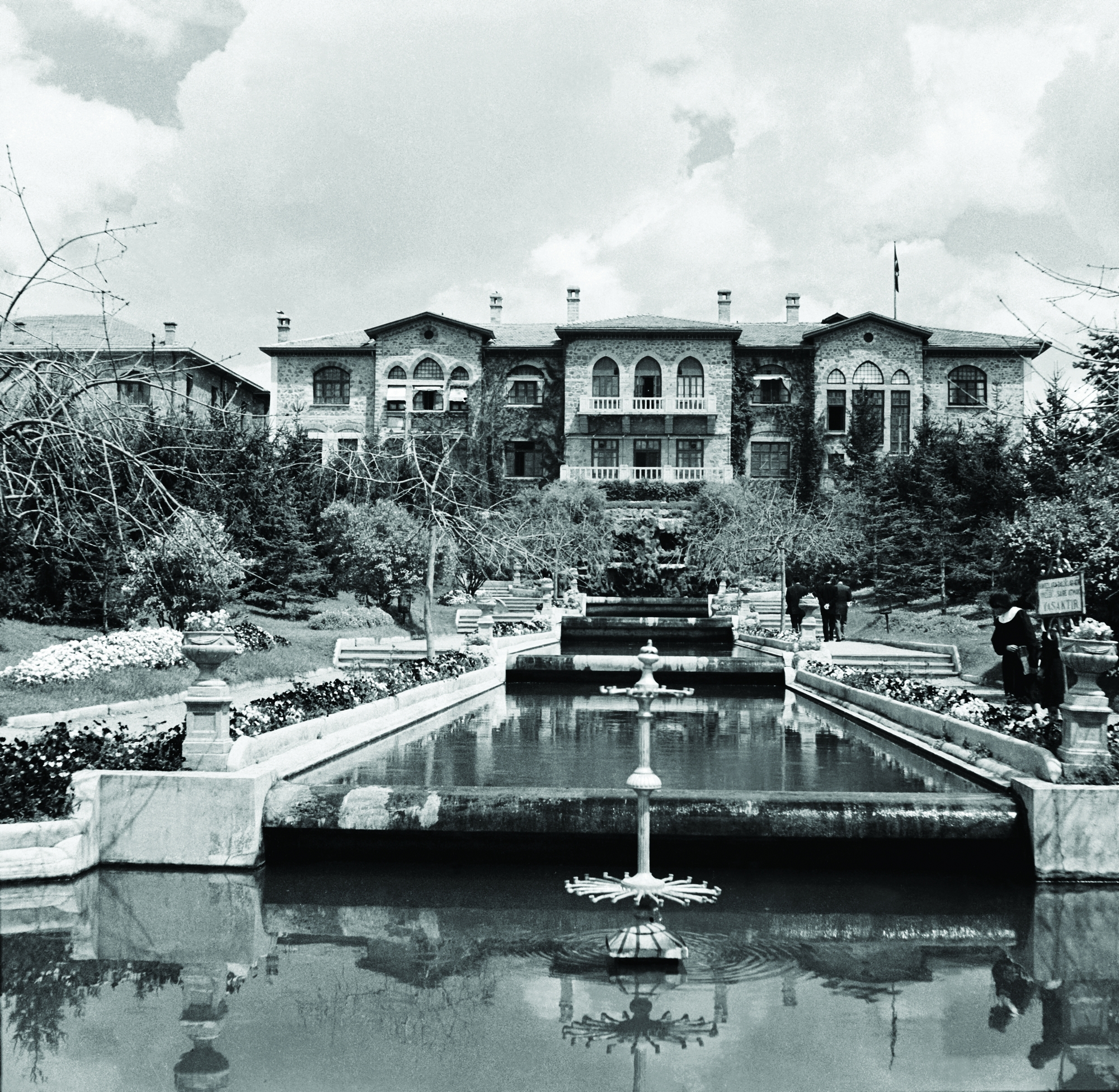
Garden of the second TBMM

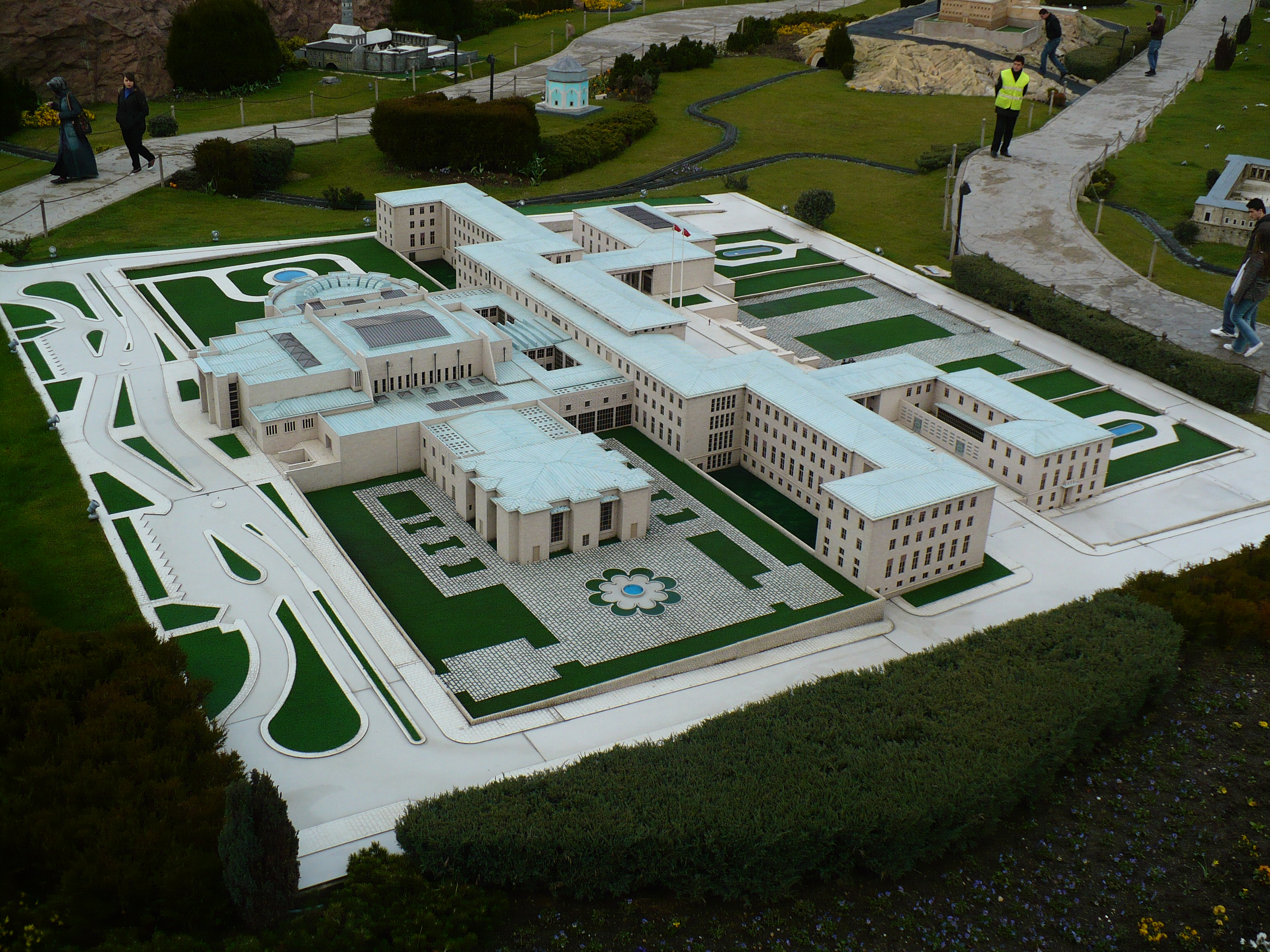
A scale model of the current TBMM

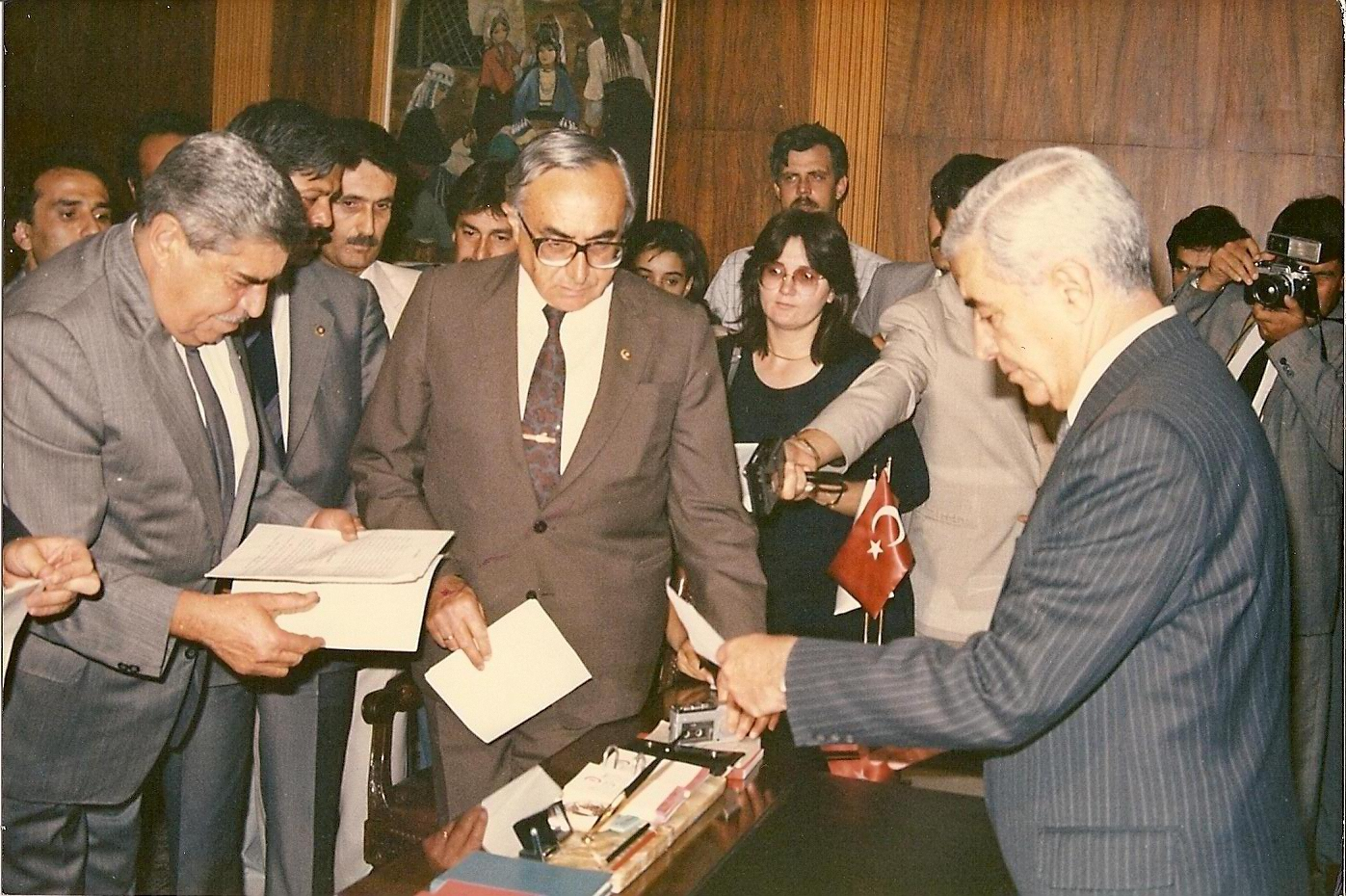
Discussion in the TBMM in the 1980s

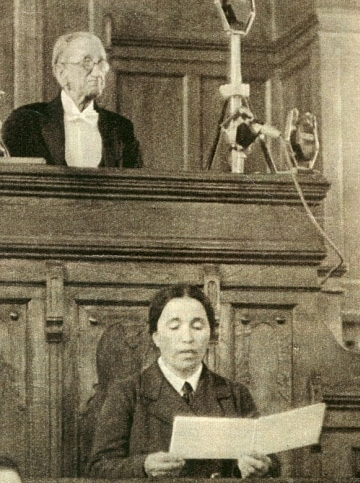
Hatı Çırpan at the rostrum

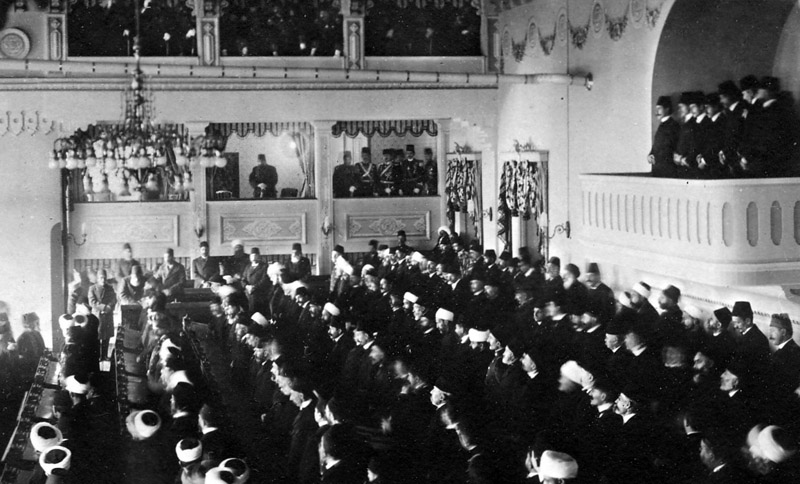
The predecessor of the TBMM was the Ottoman Parliament.

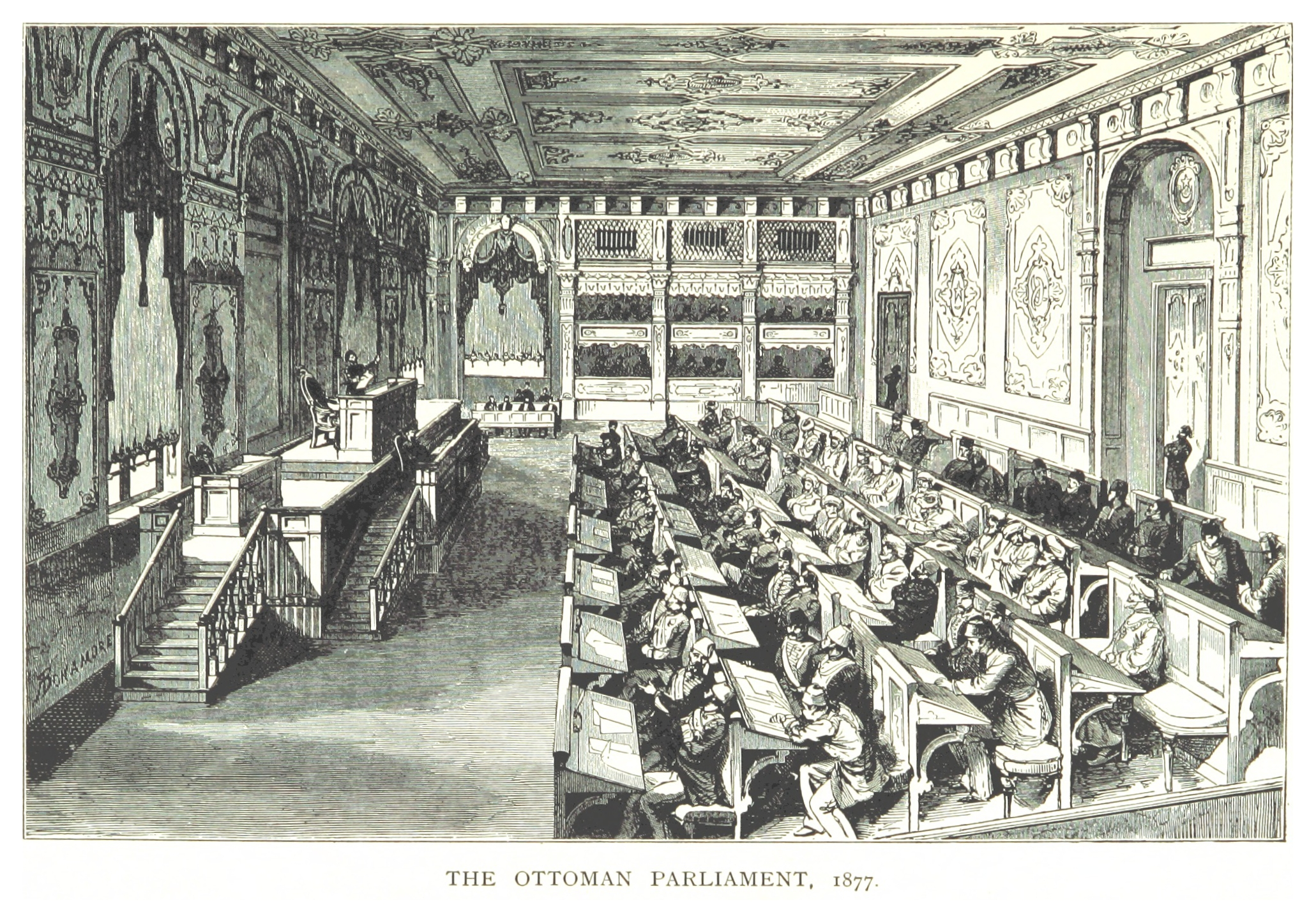
The Ottoman Parliament in 1877

== See also ==
- Ottoman Chamber of Deputies
- Turkish Senate
- List of political parties in Turkey
- List of members of the Grand National Assembly of Turkey who died in office
