= Republican Villagers Nation Party =

Defunct far-right political party in Turkey

Republican Villagers Nation Party Cumhuriyetçi Köylü Millet Partisi
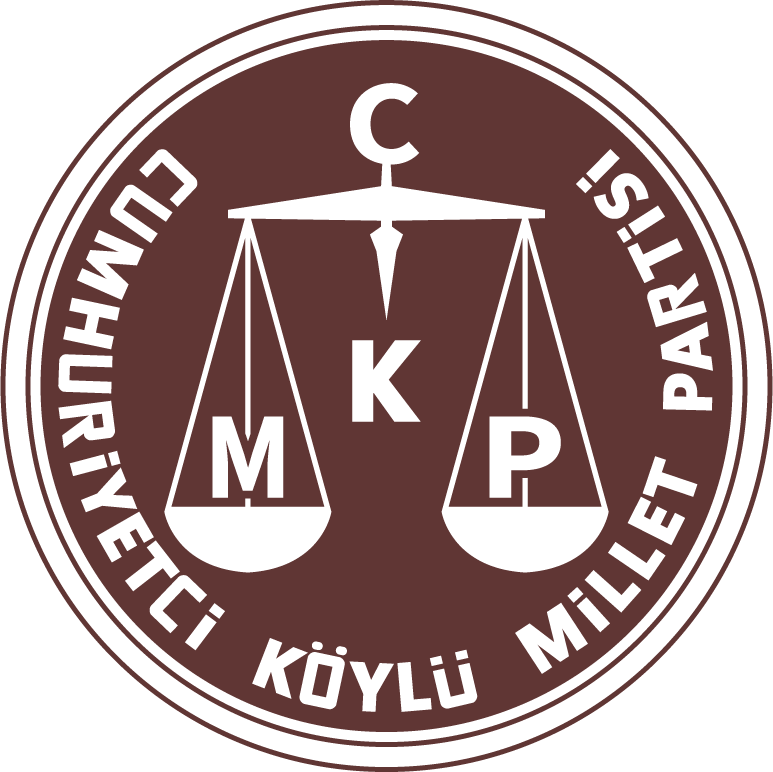
- President: Osman Bölükbaşı (first); Alparslan Türkeş (last)
- Founder: Osman Bölükbaşı
- Founded: 16 October 1958
- Dissolved: 9 February 1969
- Merger of: Republican Nation Party; Villagers Party
- Succeeded by: Nationalist Movement Party
- Ideology: Turkish nationalism National conservatism Agrarianism; Pan-Turkism; Turanism
- Political position: Far-right
- Colours: Brown (official); Ruby red (customary)

The Republican Villagers Nation Party (Turkish: Cumhuriyetçi Köylü Millet Partisi, CKMP), alternatively translated Republican Peasants' Nation Party, was a political party in Turkey.

== Fusions ==
The party was founded after the fusion of two smaller nationalist parties.

One of these parties was the Villagers Party, founded by Remzi Oğuz Arık on16 May 1952. Most of the members of this party were former Democrat Party members and they were known as Nationalists. After the death of the founder in a plane crash in 1954, the party could not gain any seats in the parliament in the 1954 and 1957 elections.

Another party was Osman Bölükbaşı's Republican Nation Party, which was founded on 27 January 1954. But unlike Turkey Villagers Party, the Republican Nation Party was actually the continuation of Bölükbaşı's former party named Nation Party which was banned in 1953. Both in 1954 and in 1957 elections they were able to gain seats in the Parliament. On October 17, 1958, the Villagers Party merged with the Republican Nation Party to form the Republican Villagers' Nation Party. The chairman of the party was Osman Bölükbaşı.

== 1960s ==
On June 12, 1960, following the May 27 coup d’état, the junta, dubbed the "National Unity Committee", dissolved the parliament and on June 13, closed the district organizations of all political parties. In 1961, when the civil parliamentary system was once again in effect, on October 15, the general elections were held, at which the Republican Villagers’ Nation Party received 14% of the votes to emerge as the third party and win 54 seats in the parliament and 16 senators. However, Osman Bölükbaşı refused to take place in the coalition government.

The CKMP members of parliament along with the members from the four remaining parties and the independent members signed a declaration on October 11, 1962, stating that they are "determined and decisive to confront any transgressions of the foundation built by the national revolution of May 27." Subsequently, the parliament decided a partial pardon for political prisoners. On June 15, 1962, the CKMP became part of the coalition led by İsmet İnönü.

== Split in the party ==
In 1962, the party faced with the problem of coalition partnership. Up to 1962, CKMP had always been an opposition party. Also in 1962, the CKMP was offered to take part in İsmet İnönü's coalition government for the first time. (see the 27th government of Turkey.) Although this offer was attractive for most of the party members, Osman Bölükbaşı was against serving under İsmet İnönü. Thus, a group of MPs under the leadership of Osman Bölükbaşı issued from the party. The new chairman of the party was Ahmet Oğuz. The party participated in the coalition government and one member, Hasan Dincer, became the deputy prime minister. But without the rhetoric of Osman Bölükbaşı the party began to lose support. Between the general elections in 1961 and 1965 the support dropped from 14% to 2.2%. Meanwhile, in 1965 Bölükbaşı refounded the Nation Party, which received 6.3% in the elections of that year.

== Conversion into MHP ==
In 1965, a meeting took place with opposition leaders, including the president of CKMP, Ahmet Oğuz and of the revived Nation Party (see below), Osman Bölükbaşı, which caused the government to resign. The new government led by independent senator Suat Hayri Ürgüplü had four ministers from the CKMP. In spring 1965, Alparslan Türkeş, along with "the 14s" who were expelled from the National Unity Committee, joined the CKMP. In August 1965 Türkeş became the new president at the expense of Ahmet Oğuz and many other senior politicians of the party. This enabled Alparslan Türkeş to a major influence over the party and during the party congress in 1967, the party's program was redesigned in line with the Nine Lights Doctrine. The CKMP gained a more nationalistic and Pan-Turkist ideology, and was hierarchically restructured after the old leadership was eliminated from the administration. Türkeş reportedly stated that: "Whoever joins the cause and becomes a traitor, kill him."

General elections were held on October 10, 1965, at which CKMP won 11 seats at the parliament and four at the senate. However, the 2.2% of votes meant that it was losing ground. On February 6–9, 1969, at the extraordinary party congress, the name of the Republican Villager's Nation Party was changed to Nationalist Movement Party (Milliyetçi Hareket Partisi – MHP) and it opened itself for the Islamist electorate. Several of the nationalist party members who opposed the new party program which included an Islamic notion, where subsequently expelled. The MHP to this day is one of Turkey's major political parties and its most prominent far-right nationalist party.
