= Nation Party (Turkey, 1948) =

Defunct nationalist political party in Turkey

The Nation Party (Turkish: Millet Partisi) was a conservative and nationalistic political party developed as a third option within the then bipartisan system in Turkey. It lasted from 1948 until 1954, when it was outlawed.

The Nation Party was founded on July 19, 1948 by former prime minister and chief of staff Fevzi Çakmak, Osman Bölükbaşı, Enis Akaygen, Yusuf Hikmet Bayur, Mustafa Kentli, Osman Nuri Köni, Kenan Öner and Sadık Aldoğan. The founders were from a conservative clique within the Democrat Party (Demokrat Parti). One of the reasons for their establishment of the party was the claim that the Democrat Party was ineffective as opposition to the Republican People's Party (CHP), the Turkish population was trapped between two political alternatives and a third alternative with a nationalistic ideology was necessary. Fevzi Çakmak was appointed as the honorary leader of the party and dubbed as the "Believer General".

The Nation Party did not participate in the 1946 elections. Before the 1950 elections, on 8 April, Fevzi Çakmak made an announcement claiming that Republican People's Party's oppression was getting fiercer. Two days later, on April 10, he died from complications following a prostatectomy. At the elections on May 14, 1950, at which the Democrat Party had won 55% of the votes, it received 3.11% of the votes (250.414 votes) to win one seat, and one of the founders, Osman Bölükbaşı became an MP. In 1954, before the elections on May 2, the Nation Party was shut down and declared outlawed on grounds of "anti-Laïcité" politics.

== Ideology ==
The party, strongly opposed the CHP's understanding of religion and laicism, while also asserting that the DP was a controlled opposition party and that they are the real opposition.

The party's program included such views as the establishment of a democratic administration, the removal of the Six Arrows from the constitution, the expansion of people's freedoms, the preparation of a general development program, and the monitoring of a liberal economic policy. The party also advocated the transition to a bicameral system.

== Successor parties ==
=== Republican Nation Party ===
The founders of the party, led by Osman Bölükbaşı, subsequently formed the Republican Nation Party (Cumhuriyetçi Millet Partisi) and won 5 seats in the parliament. All five MPs were from Kırşehir, the hometown of Bölükbaşı.

=== Republican Peasants Nation Party ===
On October 17, 1958, the Peasants' Party of Turkey merged with the Republican Nation Party to form the Republican Peasants' Nation Party (Cumhuriyetçi Köylü Millet Partisi - CKMP). On June 12, 1960, following the May 27 coup d’état, the junta, dubbed the "National Unity Committee", dissolved the parliament and on June 13, closed the district organizations of all political parties. In 1961, when the civil parliamentary system was once again in effect, on October 15, general elections were held, at which the Republican Peasants’ Nation Party received 14% of the votes to emerge as the third party and win 54 seats in the parliament and 16 senators. When the Justice Party emerged victorious at the 1963 elections, Osman Bölükbaşı, together with 28 MPs, resigned from CKMP to establish once more the Nation Party and be elected its president.

Republican Peasants’ Nation Party emblem

Colonel Alparslan Türkeş joined the party in 1965 and turned the party into a more Pan-Turkic and Islamist party. In a 1969 party convention, the CKMP renamed itself to MHP.

=== Nation Party (1962) ===
In 1962, the name was reused when Osman Bölükbaşı and a group of deputies and senators left the CKMP after a conflict and founded a new party. After some initial electoral success the party did not win any seats in the 1973 general elections, eventually dissolving itself in 1977.

=== Nation Party (1992) ===
In 1992, the name was reused again when the Reformist Democracy Party (Islahatçı Demokrasi Partisi), led by Aykut Edibali, renamed itself as Millet Partisi.
