= Turkish Villagers' Party =

Former political party in Turkey

Turkish Villagers' Party Türkiye Köylü Partisi
- Abbreviation: TKP
- President: Remzi Oğuz Arık (first); Tahsin Demiray (last)
- Founder: Remzi Oğuz Arık
- Founded: 19 May 1952
- Dissolved: 16 October 1958
- Split from: Democrat Party
- Merged into: Republican Villagers Nation Party
- Ideology: Turkish nationalism Agrarianism
- Political position: Centre-right
- Colours: Blue

Turkish Villagers' Party (Turkish: Türkiye Köylü Partisi; TKP) was a former Turkish political party.

Following 27 years of single party rule, the Democrat Party (DP) defeated the Republican People's Party (CHP) in the 1950 elections. However, DP which was a champion of democracy during the opposition years, began to follow a more centralized policy in the party during its government years. During the provincial party congress held in Adana (then known as Seyhan) the party center supported a candidate against a popular candidate of the Adana partisans. After the congress three MPs (all of which were from Adana electoral district) as well as Adana mayor resigned from the party.

On 19 May 1952, they formed the Turkish Villagers' Party. The leader of the party was Remzi Oğuz Arık an MP and a professor of archaeology. On 3 April 1954 Arık died on an airplane crash while flying from Adana to Ankara. This event was just before the 1954 Turkish general election and the party could not gain a seat in the parliament. After another failure in the 1957 Turkish general election, the party decided to merge into Republican Nation Party. (see Republican Villagers Nation Party)
