= Yeter! Söz Milletindir! =

Slogan and political propaganda

Yeter! Söz Milletindir! was the main slogan used by the Democrat Party in the 1950 Turkish general elections, which has been used since by the National Salvation Party, the Welfare Party and the Justice and Development Party. It means "Enough! The Word Belongs To The People!" in English.

When political propaganda was legalized in 1950, DP made use of radio and printed materials. An example of propaganda used through posters by the party is; "Enough! The Word Belongs To The People!" The poster has a hand meaning "stop", with the words Democrat Party below it. On the top right, "Yeter! Söz Milletindir!" is written. The term was used by Turkish revolutionaries at the time.

This poster was made by architect Selçuk Milar. According to historical testimonies, this poster was very effective and helped the Democrat Party win the election. and even the members of the Republican People's Party were surprised by the effectiveness and success of the poster. Selçuk Milar gave his full support for the poster, saying that he wanted the Turkish nation and its people to live in democracy, and that the CHP should go with the votes of the people.
