= Republican Nation Party =

Former Turkish political party

Republican Nation Party Cumhuriyetçi Millet Partisi
- Founder: Osman Bölükbaşı
- Founded: 10 February 1954
- Dissolved: 16 October 1958
- Preceded by: Nation Party
- Succeeded by: Republican Villagers Nation Party
- Ideology: Turkish nationalism
- Political position: Right-wing

The Republican Nation Party (Turkish: Cumhuriyetçi Millet Partisi, CMP) was a right-wing Turkish political party.

== History ==
The party was founded by the members of the Nation Party, which was closed by the court on 27 January 1954. Osman Bölükbaşı founded the Republican Nation Party on 10 February 1954 with the former members of the Nation Party, two weeks after the closure of the former party. Bölükbaşı became party chairman. In the elections held on 2 May 1954, the Republican Nation Party won 5 seats due in large part to Bölükbaşı's rhetoric and campaigning.

On June 24, 1957, the parliament stripped Bölükbaşı of his parliamentary immunity on the grounds of "insulting the incorporeal personality of the parliament". Bölükbaşı was arrested on July 2, on a court decision, which was overturned by another court order on July 23. Two days later, on July 25, Bölükbaşı was again arrested. When he won a seat at the elections on October 27, along with three more from his party, Bölükbaşı was released on immunity.

On 30 May of the same year the government, led by the Democrat Party, abolished Kırşehir Province (Bölükbaşı’s electoral province). Prime Minister Adnan Menderes stated that the reason of statue change was the abnormality of voters' decision: the percentage of CMP votes was much higher in Kırşehir Province than it was in Turkey in general. Kırşehir regained its status as a province on 1 July 1957. Despite the reinstatement, Bölükbaşı made a name as a political opponent of the Democrat Party government with his small party. Shortly afterwards, on 2 July 1957, Bölükbaşı was arrested for the alleged offense of insulting the parliament. As a result of his arrest, he couldn’t campaign for the 1957 elections. Despite his inability to campaign, his party increased its votes and Bölükbaşı kept his seat in the elections held on 27 October 1957. One month after the election, he was acquitted.

== Merger ==
On 17 October 1958 Republican Nation Party merged with the Turkish Villagers' Party to form the Republican Peasants' Nation Party.
