= Abdullah Güler =

Turkish politician (born 1969)

Parliamentary Leader of the Justice and Development Party
- Incumbent
- Assumed office 3 June 2023
- Preceded by: İsmet Yılmaz

Member of the Grand National Assembly
- Incumbent
- Assumed office 7 July 2018
- Constituency: Istanbul (II) (2018); Sivas (2023)

Personal details
- Born: March 28, 1969 (age 56) Sivas, Turkey
- Political party: Justice and Development Party

Abdullah Güler (born March 28, 1969) is a Turkish politician currently serving as the parliamentary leader for the Justice and Development Party.

== Biography ==
Güler was born on March 28, 1969, in Sivas, to Ahmet Ali and Fatma Güler. He graduated from the Istanbul University Faculty of Law in 1994, and went on to work as a freelance lawyer for many years. From 2009 to 2014, he served on the Istanbul Metropolitan Municipality Council, and also worked as the Vice President of the Turkish Archery Federation from 2016 to 2018. Güler was elected as the Chairman of the AK Party in May of 2023.
