= Fatin Gökmen =

Turkish astronomer

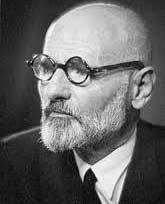
- Born: 6 January 1877; Akseki, Ottoman Empire
- Died: 1955 (aged 77–78); Istanbul, Turkey
- Occupation: Astronomer

Fatin Gökmen (6 January 1877 – 1955) was a Turkish astronomer and politician. He was a key figure in facilitating the emergence of the modern astronomical observatory in Turkey. The Imperial Observatory, established in Istanbul in 1867 under the directorship of Aristide Coumbary, was mainly a meteorological centre.

== Life ==
He was born in 1877 in Akseki, Turkey. His father was a traditional Islamic scholar. His primary education occurred in Akseki and Alanya.

He died in 1955 in Istanbul.

== Career ==
He spent most of his life in the Kandilli Observatory. He spent nearly fifteen years there. He installed several Zeiss lenses there. He wrote several books on the history of Islamic astronomy.

He entered Istanbul University in 1933 and left the university in 1943. He also played a key role in Turkish politics.

A primary school in Istanbul is named after him.
