= Nation Party (Turkey, 1962) =

Nation Party Millet Partisi
- Founder: Osman Bölükbaşı
- Founded: 14 June 1962
- Banned: 16 October 1981
- Split from: Republican Villagers Nation Party

The Nation Party (Turkish: Millet Partisi) was a Turkish conservative and nationalistic political party active from 1962 to 1977.

== History ==
An earlier party named "Nation Party" had existed from 1948 to 1953, when it was outlawed. The founders of the party, led by Osman Bölükbaşı, subsequently formed the Republican Nation Party (Cumhuriyetçi Millet Partisi), which next merged with the Peasants' Party of Turkey to form the Republican Villagers Nation Party (Cumhuriyetçi Köylü Millet Partisi – CKMP).

In 1962 the name was reused when Osman Bölükbaşı and a group of deputies and senators left the CKMP after a conflict about whether CKMP should join İsmet İnönü's 27th government of Turkey, and founded a new party, for which they reused the name "Nation Party". The new Nation Party, with Osman Bölükbaşı as president won 31 seats in parliament and 2 in the senate in the 1965 elections, joining the coalition government led by Suat Hayri Ürgüplü. However, Osman Bölükbaşı was not a part of the cabinet and publicly criticized it. In the June 5, 1966 partial senate elections, the Nation Party won one seat, and in the October 12, 1969 elections, it won 6 seats in the parliament.

In 1972, Osman Bölükbaşı resigned, and retired Chief of Staff Cemal Tural became the president of the Nation Party. The party did not win any seats in the 1973 general elections.

After the 1980 Turkish coup d'état, the party was banned with the Law No. 2533 dated 16 October 1981.

== See also ==
- Nation Party (Turkey, 1948)
- Nation Party (Turkey, 1992)
