= 1957 Turkish general election =

- 27 October 1957

610 seats in the Grand National Assembly 306 seats needed for a majority
- Turnout: 76.6% ▼12.0pp
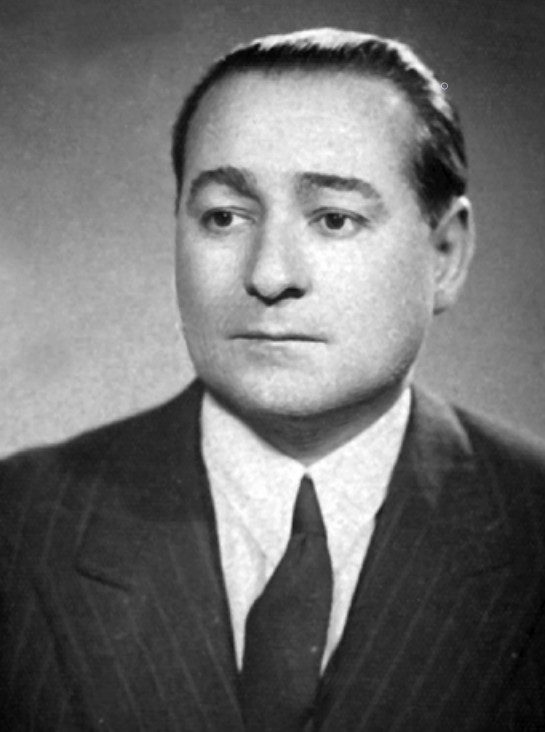

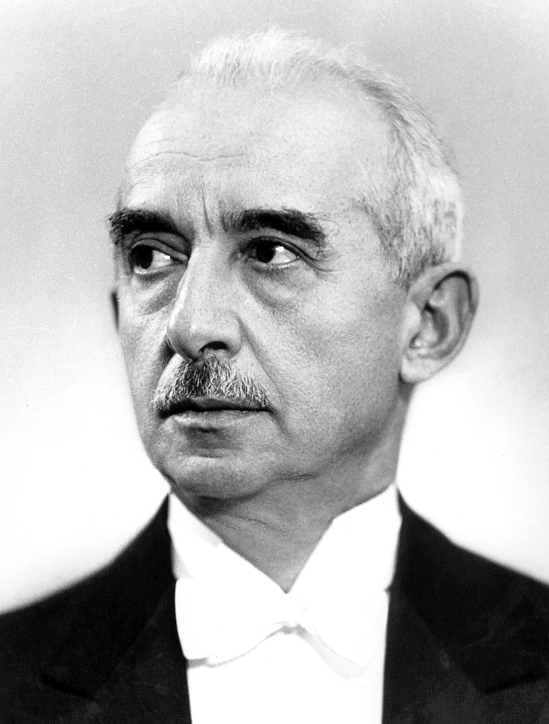

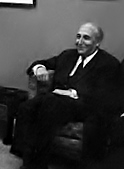
	First party	Second party
Leader	Adnan Menderes	İsmet İnönü
Party	DP	CHP
Last election	58.42%, 503 seats	35.11%, 31 seats
Seats won	424	178
Seat change	▼79	▲147
Popular vote	4,497,811	3,825,267
Percentage	48.62%	41.35%
Swing	▼9.80pp	▲6.24pp
	Third party	Fourth party
Leader	Osman Bölükbaşı	Fevzi Lütfi Karaosmanoğlu
Party	CMP	HP
Last election	5.28%, 5 seats	–
Seats won	4	4
Seat change	▼1	New
Popular vote	604,087	321,471
Percentage	6.53%	3.48%
Swing	▲1.25pp	New
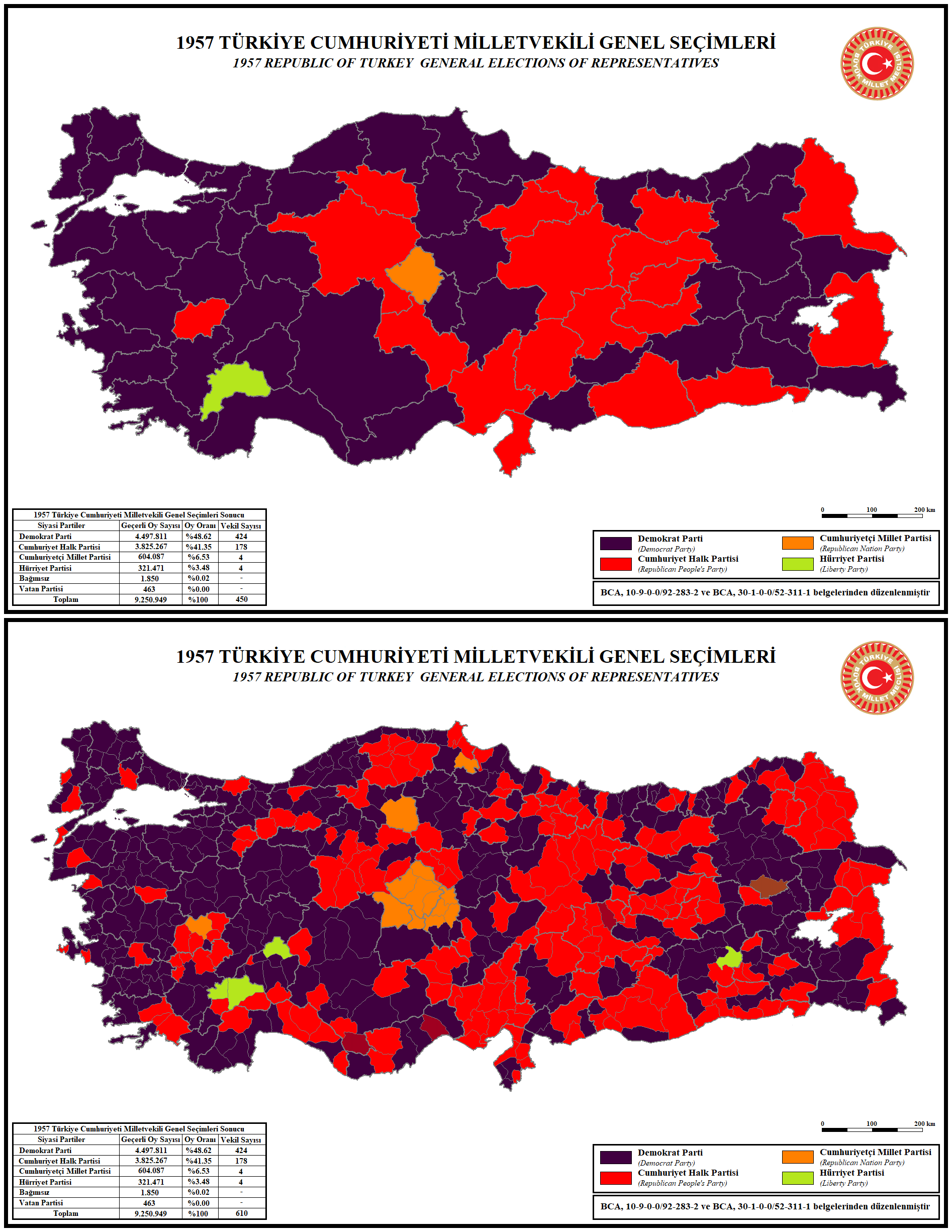
Prime Minister before election
Adnan Menderes
DP
Elected Prime Minister
Adnan Menderes
DP

General elections were held in Turkey on 27 October 1957. The electoral system used was the multiple non-transferable vote, with each electoral district electing an average of nine members. The result was a victory for the Democrat Party, which won 424 of the 610 seats.

== Results ==
Party	Votes	%	Seats	+/–
Democrat Party	4,497,811	48.62	424	–79
Republican People's Party	3,825,267	41.35	178	+147
Republican Nation Party	604,087	6.53	4	–1
Liberty Party	321,471	3.48	4	New
Homeland Party	463	0.01	0	New
Independents	1,850	0.02	0	–2
Total	9,250,949	100.00	610	+69
Registered voters/turnout	12,078,623	–		
Source: YSK
