= 1954 Turkish general election =

- 2 May 1954

541 seats in the Grand National Assembly 271 seats needed for a majority
- Turnout: 88.6% ▼0.7pp
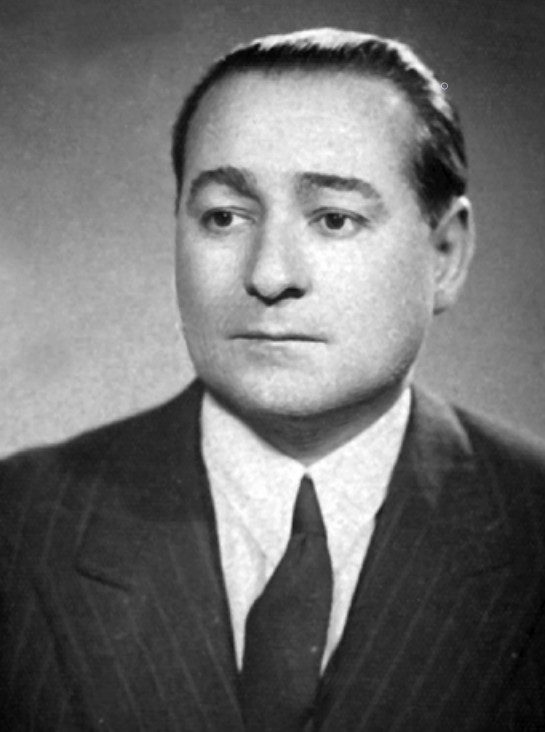

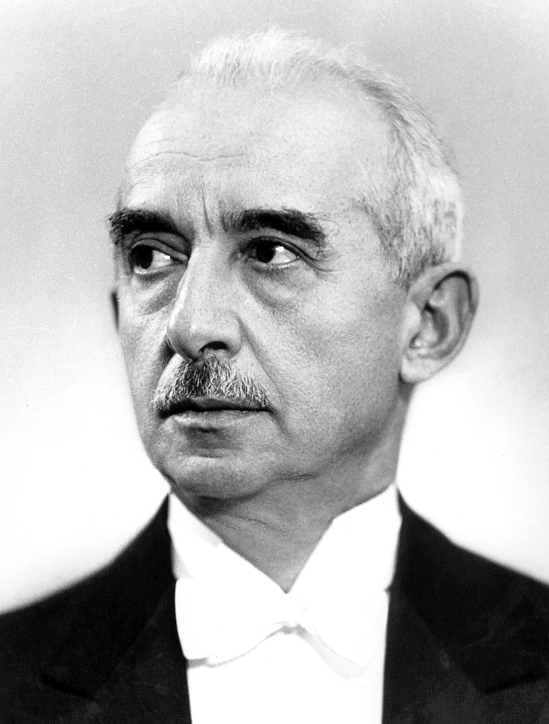
	First party	Second party
Leader	Adnan Menderes	İsmet İnönü
Party	DP	CHP
Last election	55.22%, 416 seats	39.59%, 69 seats
Seats won	503	31
Seat change	▲87	▼38
Popular vote	5,313,659	3,193,471
Percentage	58.42%	35.11%
Swing	▲3.20pp	▼4.48pp
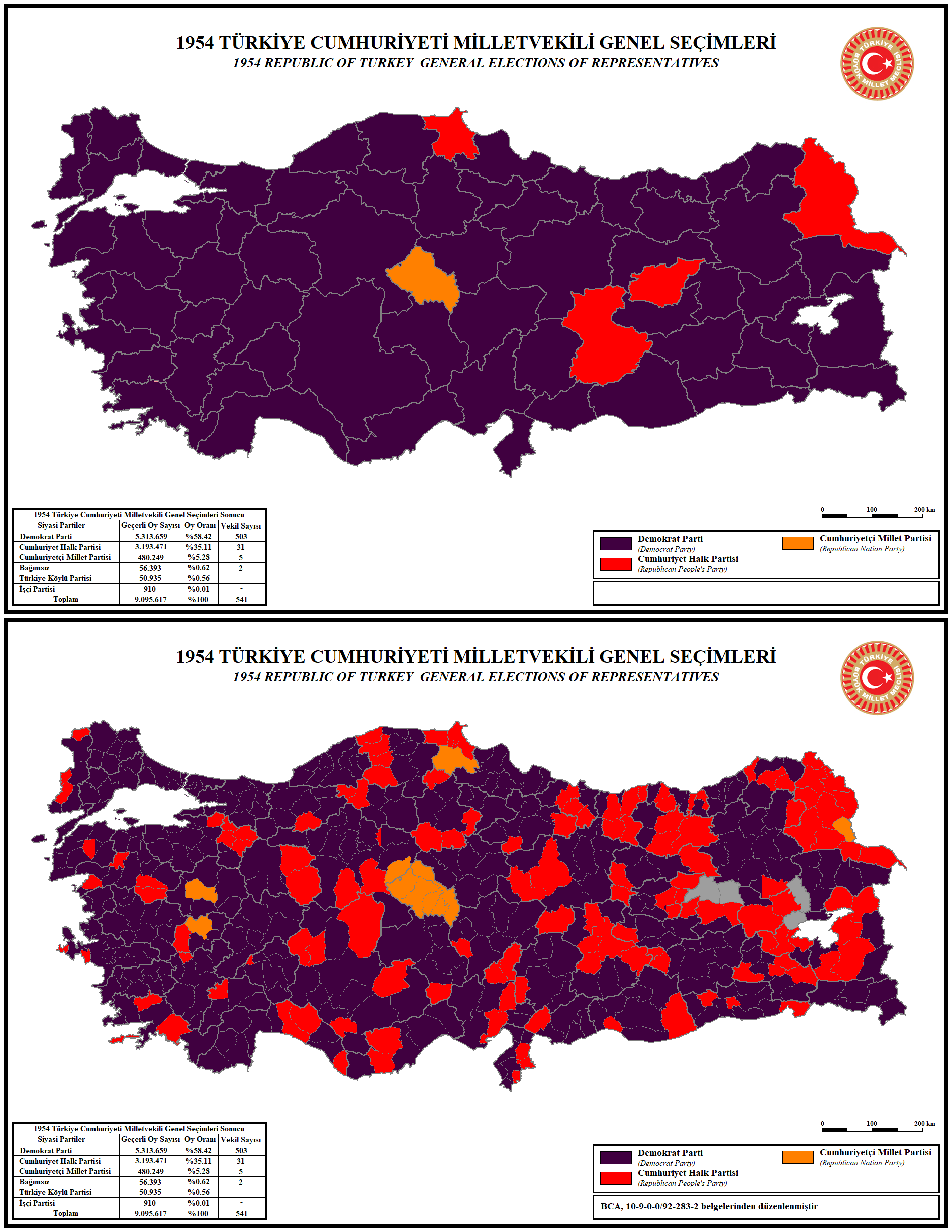
- Most voted-for party by province
Prime Minister before election
Adnan Menderes
DP
Elected Prime Minister
Adnan Menderes
DP

General elections were held in Turkey on 2 May 1954. The electoral system used was the multiple non-transferable vote. The result was a landslide victory for the Democrat Party, which won 503 of the 541 seats. Voter turnout was 88.6%.

== Results ==
Party	Votes	%	Seats	+/–
Democrat Party	5,313,659	58.42	503	+87
Republican People's Party	3,193,471	35.11	31	–38
Republican Nation Party	480,249	5.28	5	New
Turkish Villagers' Party	50,935	0.56	0	New
Democratic Labour Party	910	0.01	0	New
Independents	56,393	0.62	2	–6
Total	9,095,617	100.00	541	+54
Registered voters/turnout	10,262,063	–		
Source: YSK
