= 1961 Turkish general election =

- 15 October 1961

450 seats in the National Assembly 226 seats needed for a majority
- Turnout: 81.41% (▲4.82pp)
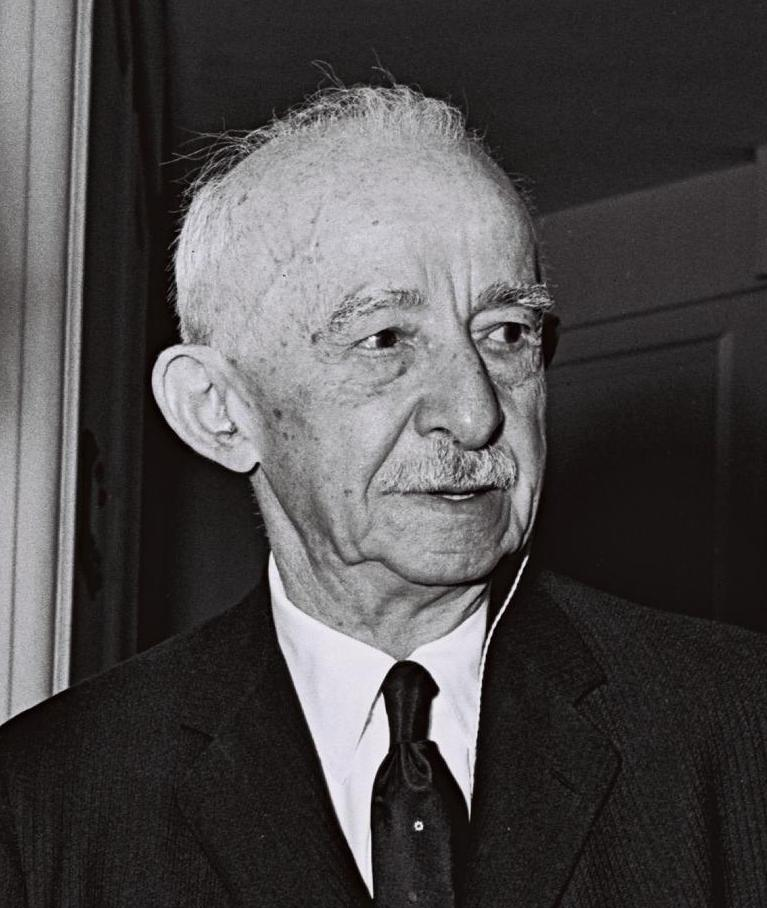

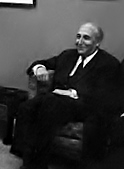

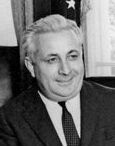
	First party	Second party
Leader	İsmet İnönü	Ragıp Gümüşpala
Party	CHP	AP
Last election	41.35%, 178 seats	–
Seats won	173	158
Seat change	▼5	New
Popular vote	3,724,752	3,527,435
Percentage	36.73%	34.78%
Swing	▼4.62pp	New
	Third party	Fourth party
Leader	Osman Bölükbaşı	Ekrem Alican
Party	CKMP	YTP
Last election	–	–
Seats won	54	65
Seat change	New	New
Popular vote	1,415,390	1,391,934
Percentage	13.96%	13.73%
Swing	New	New
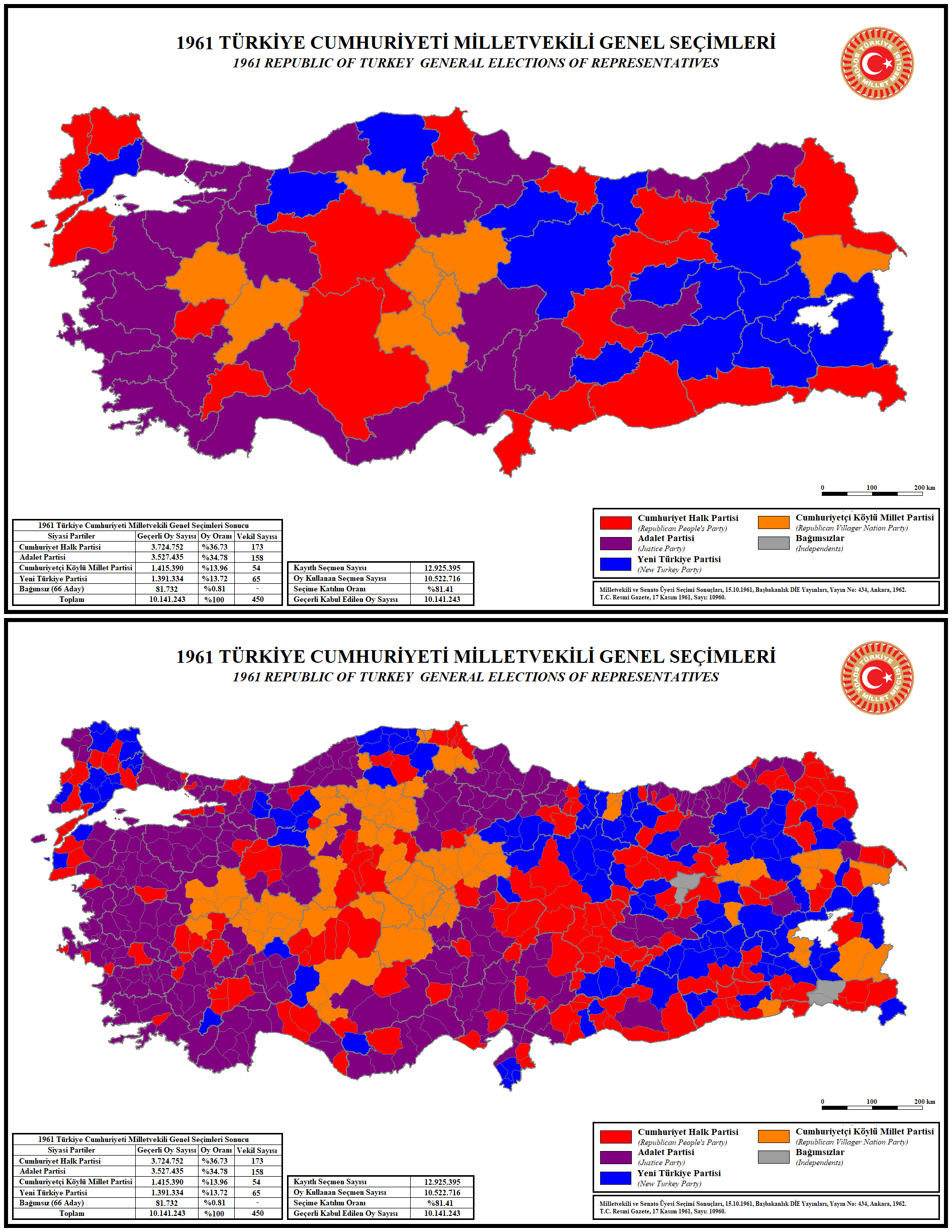
- Most voted-for party by province

Prime Minister before election
Cemal Gürsel (acting Fahri Özdilek)
Military
Elected Prime Minister
İsmet İnönü
CHP

General elections were held in Turkey on 15 October 1961. The Republican People's Party (CHP) emerged as the largest party, winning 173 of the 450 seats. It was the first time the CHP had won the most seats after the transition to a multi-party system, and the first time no party won a majority of seats. Voter turnout was 81%.

== Electoral system ==
The electoral system used was party-list proportional representation with the D'Hondt method in 67 electoral districts. In order to receive seats in a district, parties needed to win a Hare quota in that district.

== Results ==
Party	Votes	%	Seats	+/–
Republican People's Party	3,724,752	36.73	173	–5
Justice Party	3,527,435	34.78	158	New
Republican Villagers Nation Party	1,415,390	13.96	54	New
New Turkey Party	1,391,934	13.73	65	New
Independents	81,732	0.81	0	–2
Total	10,141,243	100.00	450	–160
Valid votes	10,138,035	96.34		
Invalid/blank votes	384,681	3.66		
Total votes	10,522,716	100.00		
Registered voters/turnout	12,925,395	81.41		
Source: YSK
