= Democrat Party (Turkey, 1946–1960) =

Democrat Party Demokrat Parti
- President: Celâl Bayar (first); Adnan Menderes (second)
- Founder: Celâl Bayar, Adnan Menderes, Fuat Köprülü and Refik Koraltan
- Founded: 7 January 1946
- Banned: 29 September 1960
- Split from: Republican People's Party
- Succeeded by: Justice Party; New Turkey Party
- Headquarters: Ankara, Turkey
- Ideology: Liberal conservatism Economic liberalism Right-wing populism Atlanticism; Party program: Kemalism
- Political position: Centre-right
- Colours: Red (official); Purple (customary)

Party flag

The Democrat Party (Turkish: Demokrat Parti, DP for short) was a centre-right political party in Turkey, and the country's third legal opposition party, after the Liberal Republican Party (Serbest Cumhuriyet Fırkası) established by Ali Fethi Okyar in 1930, and the National Development Party (Milli Kalkınma Partisi) established by Nuri Demirağ in 1945. Founded and led by Celâl Bayar and Adnan Menderes, it was the first of the opposition parties to rise to power, unseating the Republican People's Party (Cumhuriyet Halk Partisi) during the national elections of 1950 and ending Turkey's one party era. The party ″facilitated the resurgence of Islam, especially at the popular level, in Turkey″.

== History ==
The events and outcome of World War II played a large role in the emergence of the Democrat Party. A condemnation of fascism coincided with the defeat of the Axis Powers, and President İsmet İnönü realized that if he did not invite opposition against the CHP, Turkey would fall into social upheaval: one-party governments were no longer seen as acceptable means of rule for modern states. Though the Independent Group – an opposition group of independents– was formed upon İnönü's assention as President in 1938, the opposition was weak and confined to 5–8% of the parliament. On November 1, 1945, İnönü made a speech in which he formally invited the formation of opposition parties in order to align Turkey with the democratic principles that had emerged victorious in the war.

But other factors were already at work in undermining the rule of the Republican People's Party – namely, the stagnant nature of the economy. Within the CHP and throughout the country, a rift was forming between statists and liberals, and that rift was magnified with the passage of the land reform bill of 1945. Although the bill was passed, 4 CHP parliamentarians, Celal Bayar, Adnan Menderes, Refik Koraltan, and Fuat Köprülü signed a motion criticizing party regulations, and were expelled from the CHP. They formed the Democrat Party that same year.

Due to the Democrat Party's infancy and its inability to fully organize or establish rapport with the Turkish public immediately after its conception, they lost the 1946 national elections with no surprise. In the four years that spanned before the next election, İnönü and the CHP tried desperately to reaffirm their popularity in the Republic, but voters were unconvinced that the party could implement any real change after 27 years in power.

By 1950, the Democrat Party had come to portray itself as the champions of the Turkish people, resentful of the CHP and ruling elite classes, despite the fact that most of its leaders were members of this same bureaucratic class. The Democrat Party exploited the CHP's association with Westernization, a source of hostility for the public and a sign they were losing touch with their citizenry. Following the example of the DP, the CHP extended its efforts into the villages to compete for votes, inducting the peasantry into politics for the first time.

In the 1950 elections, the Democrat Party enjoyed a landslide victory and won the majority of seats in the National Assembly, surprising many, especially the Democrats themselves. This was because of the multiple non-transferable vote system employed in the elections. Their leader, Adnan Menderes, became Prime Minister and Celal Bayar became president. The peaceful transition to power from the CHP to the DP marked the beginning of a competitive political system in Turkey.

=== 1950–60 ===
The new Democratic-controlled Parliament offered a new, broadened political elite. There was a shift from members with military and bureaucratic backgrounds to those with commercial backgrounds and increased representation from small provinces (opposed to mainly Istanbul or Ankara). Despite attacks on İnönü and the CHP's efforts to orient Turkey with the West, the Democrats under Menderes continued this trend. After several busts of Mustafa Kemal Atatürk were vandalized, the DP Government introduced Law No.5816 on the 31 July 1951, which prohibited the defamation of Atatürk. In 1952, Turkey joined NATO and strengthened its ties with the West, an effort to protect against potential Soviet expansionism. Menderes and the Democrat Party became increasingly more involved in issues of national security, and it is often thought that they highlighted these efforts to draw attention away from the poor economic health of the nation, a tactic that would not remain successful for long. The economy grew with Marshall Plan aid and from privatizing state industry that had 27 years of protected growth under the CHP's statist economic policy.

The 1954 elections were again overwhelmingly won by the Democrat Party and Menderes remained Prime Minister. However, by 1955 widespread support for the DP began to deteriorate due to the nation's worsening economic situation, partly due to Marshall Plan aid running out. To distract citizens from the economy, xenophobia was employed against the remaining Greeks of Turkey in the Istanbul Pogrom. The economic policies pursued under the DP rule had led to high inflation rates, shortages of critical goods, and poor economic development. Additionally, the DP government began showing a deep authoritarian streak. In the years ahead, the DP increasingly suppressed opposition within their own party and with that of rival parties and stifled the press.

In the 1957 elections, the DP blocked opposition parties from forming electoral alliances. While the opposition parties won the popular vote, this was not represented in parliament due to the winner-takes-all electoral system used at the time. The DP continued their authoritarian policies until 1960 saw the country's political situation rapidly deteriorate.

=== 27 May 1960 coup d'état ===
On May 27, 1960, the DP government was overthrown by military group called the National Unity Committee, led by General Cemal Gürsel. The military feared that the founding principles of the Turkish Republic were being eroded, and there was growing public dissatisfaction with Menderes' perceived intolerance of criticism. The military junta stayed in power for the next eighteen months, trying several top DP leaders for unconstitutional rule and high treason. Three of them, including Menderes, were executed. Five others, including Bayar, were sentenced to life imprisonment. The party was officially suppressed on September 29, 1960.

== Ideology ==
The Democrat Party was founded in 1946 to oppose the ruling Republican People's Party, which had established the Turkish Republic and had remained in power from the founding of the Republic through 1950. Its founding members were all well-respected figures in the CHP before breaking off and establishing the Democrat Party. For this reason, both political parties had ideologies rooted in Kemalism which prevented the DP from differing substantially in practice from its predecessor, although it held notable variances in platform. Additionally, the DP still had to function within the confines of the 1924 constitution established by Atatürk and the first parliament which restricted the distance they could put between themselves and the CHP. Although it supported the resurgence of Islam, Democrat Party MPs who supported the creation of an Islamic state were expelled from the party.

The main differences in platform between the two lay in economic policy. While the CHP was guided by statism, the Democrat Party was more interested in privatizing state industries that had helped jump-start the Turkish Republic after World War I and the War of Independence now that the country was no longer nascent. The Democrat Party did not repudiate the Republican People's Party's policy of Westernization, but did not pursue it with quite the same vigour. It was also less militantly secular than the Republican People's Party, and championed populism which gained it wide support among Turkey's intelligentsia.

The party's logo, a galloping white horse, comes from the strong resemblance of the foreign word Demokrat to the Turkish words Demir Kırat, "Iron Kırat". The horse Kırat was a character in popular Turkish legend; it was the horse and trusted companion of Köroğlu, a Robin Hood-type hero who championed causes of the common people against the oppressive regime. Demokrat and Demir Kırat were often interchanged by the peasantry.

== Successor parties ==
=== Justice Party ===
Though the military executed Menderes, the military was overall sympathetic with the DP's policies, as was much of the country, particularly the peasants. In the 1961 elections, neo-DP parties captured 48% of the vote, among them being the New Turkey Party (Yeni Türkiye Partisi) and the Justice Party (Adalet Partisi) founded by Ragıp Gümüşpala. Süleyman Demirel became leader of the right-wing AP in 1964. With his position as leader of the preeminent DP-successor party, Demirel became one of Turkey's major political figures, and AP one of Turkey's major political parties. It was banned after the 1980 coup.

=== Democratic Party (1970) ===
In 1970, the Justice Party's conservative wing broke away and launched the Democratic Party, which included many former DP leaders. It received 11.9% of the vote in the 1973 elections. By 1980, the party dissolved itself.

=== True Path Party ===
With the 1980 coup, all political parties were banned, including the use of their names and logos, while party leaders were imprisoned. The True Path Party (Doğru Yol Partisi) was founded in 1983 as a successor party of the Justice Party. In 1987, a passed referendum allowed pre-1980 politicians to participate in political life again, allowing Demirel to become leader of his political movement again. DYP and its rival Motherland Party (ANAP) will be Turkey's preeminent center-right political parties.

In 1993, Demirel stepped down as leader of DYP when he was elected Turkey's 9th president, picking Tansu Çiller to become leader of the party to succeed him as well as his premiership. In the 2002 elections, the party was not able to surpass the 10% threshold and received no seats in the National Assembly. In a 2007 party convention, it renamed itself to the modern Democrat Party.

=== Democrat Party (1992) ===
In November 1992, at what was declared to be the party's 5th Grand Conference, several former members relaunched the Democrat Party under the same name and emblem. It was at first led by Hayrettin Erkmen, but the most prominent leader was Aydın Menderes, son of Adnan, who was elected the party's third leader in February 1994. He led until a crippling road accident in 1996. The relaunched Democratic Party never entertained mainstream politics, and did not participate in Turkey's elections of 2002. Other recent leaders have included Yalçın Koçak.

=== Democrat Party (2007) ===
In the 2007 DYP congress, DYP and ANAP announced a merger and for the occasion renamed itself to the Democrat Party. While the merger failed in the lead up to the 2007 election, DP and ANAP were eventually able to merge in 2009. In the 2018 elections, it participated in the Nation Alliance with the CHP, İyi Parti and Saadet Partisi. It received one seat in the elected from İyi Parti's lists. In the 2023 parliamentary election it received three seats from CHP's lists.

== Election results ==
Grand National Assembly of Turkey
Year	Votes	Vote %	Seats	Government
1946			64 / 465	CHP
1950	4,241,393	53.3	408 / 487	DP
1954	5,313,659	58.4	503 / 541	DP
1957	4,497,811	48.6	424 / 610	DP

== See also ==
- Liberalism in Turkey
- Conservatism in Turkey
- Justice and Development Party
- Süleyman Demirel
