= Öymen =

Öymen is a Turkish surname. Notable people with the surname include:

- Altan Öymen (1932–2025), Turkish journalist and politician
- Fakihe Öymen (1900–1983), Turkish school teacher and politician
- Onur Öymen (born 1940), Turkish diplomat and politician
