= List of Turkish women who won international beauty pageants =

Below is the list of Turkish women who won the international beauty pageants.

Year	Contest	Name
1932	International Beauty	Keriman Halis Ece
1952	Miss Europe	Günseli Başar
1971	Miss Europe	Filiz Vural
1981	Miss Asia Pacific	Ayla Atlas
1982	Miss Europe	Nazlı Deniz Kuruoğlu
1983	Miss Europe	Neşe Erberk
1986	Miss Asia Pacific	Melek Gürkan
1993	Miss Europe	Arzum Onan
2002	Miss World	Azra Akın

== See also ==
- Women in Turkey
