= Fatma Seher Erden =

Turkish soldier during the War of Independence (1888–1955)

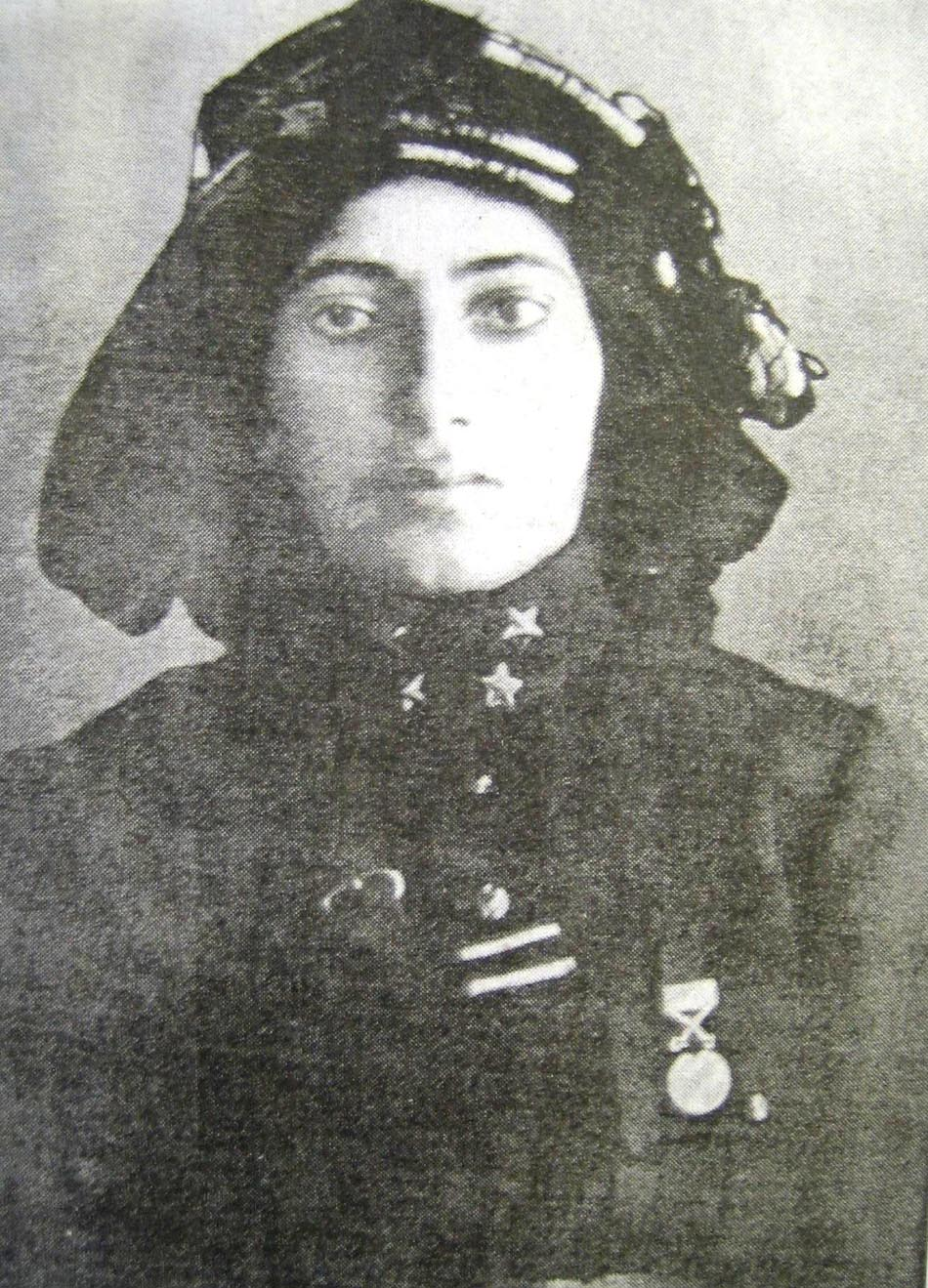
- Fatma Seher Erden
- Born: 1888; Erzurum, Erzurum Vilayet, Ottoman Empire
- Died: 1955 (aged 66–67); Istanbul, Turkey
- Burial place: Kulaksız Cemetery, Istanbul
- Military career
- Allegiance: Turkey
- Service years: 1919–1923
- Rank: First Lieutenant
- Nickname: Kara Fatma
- Commands: Militia
- Conflicts: Turkish War of Independence
- Awards: Medal of Independence

Fatma Seher Erden (1888 – 2 July 1955), known as Kara Fatma, was a female Turkish soldier who distinguished herself as a militia leader during the Turkish War of Independence.

== Nickname ==
The word kara literally means "black" in Turkish and is sometimes used as a synonym for "brunette"; when used for warriors, however, it usually means "courageous". Mustafa Kemal Atatürk gave her the nickname of Kara Fatma.

== Life ==
She was born in the city of Erzurum, in the Erzurum Vilayet of the Ottoman Empire. Her father was Yusuf Ağa. Her husband died during the Caucasus Campaign in the First World War. In 1919, she travelled to Sivas where a congress was held by Mustafa Kemal Pasha (later Atatürk). She requested to be enlisted in the army. After Mustafa Kemal Pasha's approval, she formed a militia group. There were 43 women in addition to 700 men under her command. She was taken prisoner twice by the Greek Army. According to an interview in the newspaper Tanin, during her second imprisonment, she was taken to the headquarters of General Nikolaos Trikoupis, where the general spoke to her. She managed to escape from the prison soon afterwards. She fought at both the İzmit-Bursa and İzmir fronts. According to the columnist Yılmaz Özdil, her unit was one of the first to enter İzmir during the Liberation of İzmir from the Greeks on 9 September 1922. Her unit controlled Karşıyaka (north of İzmir Gulf).

== Later years ==
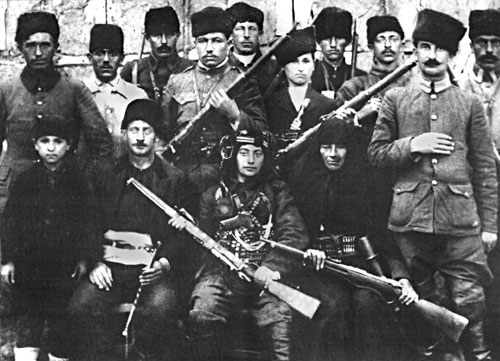
Kara Fatma (bottom center) and colleagues

Although female soldiers were unheard of until 1919, Kara Fatma was officially appointed as a soldier, as were many others (including Halide Edib Adıvar) under Mustafa Kemal Pasha. She began her military career as a corporal and ended as a first lieutenant. She then retired and donated her pension to the Turkish Red Crescent. She almost faded away from public memory until 1933, when a journalist found her living in poverty in a former Russian monastery in Istanbul with her grandchild. In 1944, she published her memoirs. She was given work and honoured by displaying her medal on military parades in national days.

Kara Fatma died on 2 July 1955 at the hospital of Darülaceze, a charity foundation, run by the Municipality of Istanbul, where she spent the last years of her life.

== Legacy ==
She was decorated with a Medal of Independence, a medal reserved to those people who majorly contributed to the Turkish War of Independence.

== See also ==
- Women in Turkey
- 1927 Adana Railway Strike
