= Polygamy in Turkey =

Turkey is a predominantly Muslim nation that has abolished polygamy, which was officially criminalized with the adoption of the Turkish Civil Code in 1926, a milestone in Atatürk's secularist reforms. Penalties for illegal polygamy are up to 2 years imprisonment. Turkey has long been known for its promotion of secularism, and later introduced even stricter bans on polygamy.

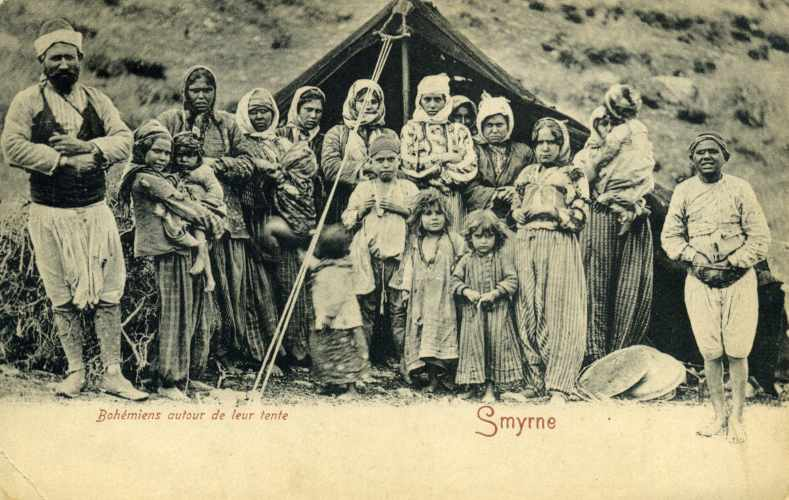
Postcard of a Turkish Romani man with his wives and children, in front of their tent in Smyrna (today İzmir) in 1903

Although polygamy is rare in Turkish society, the practice still exists in the Kurdish-populated rural southeast.

== See also ==
- Turkish women
- Secularism in Turkey
- Women in Turkish politics
- Religion in Turkey
