= 1927 Adana Railway Strike =

Labor dispute in Turkey

The 1927 Adana Railway Strike was a labor strike in Turkey initiated by the workers on the Mersin-Nusaybin railway line on August 10, 1927, lasting for 13 days, after which the workers accepted a seven percent salary increase following the intervention of the government.

== Background ==
Although the ownership of the train lines passed to the state after the proclamation of Turkey, the operation of the Mersin-Nusaybin line was in the hands of a French company located in the city of Aleppo, Syria, under the French mandate. At that time, the line was used not only for passenger transportation but also for freight transportation. However, the fact that the line was operated by a foreign company further complicated the situation in the newly independent country.

== Strike ==
The unrest that broke out over the non-payment of the salaries of the railway warehouse workers in Adana spread to the railway workers along the entire line. When there was no result in the negotiations between the workers' representatives and the French company officials, a strike began on the whole line on 10 August 1927. Although the Minister of Public Works, Behiç Erkin, was involved in the negotiations at the beginning of the strike and he was in charge of the railways during the Turkish War of Independence, it was welcomed by the workers, but the government did not take steps to solve the problem. Meanwhile, the company tried to make train services by force, the police and soldiers pressed for the opening of the line, tried to employ the strikebreaker workers, but backed down in the face of the workers' determination. Kara Fatma, one of the heroes of the War of Independence, also supported the strike and organized the women of the workers for the strike.

== Effect of Communist Party of Turkey ==
The Communist Party of Turkey, which was founded in Baku in 1920 and which was prosecuted and whose leaders were killed despite wanting to support the War of Independence, joined the strike. Very few of its cadres were helpful in initiating and maintaining the strike, and intervened when the strike might fail. However, due to insufficient organization in Adana and communication problems with the underground Central Committee, the party could not fully direct the strike. In addition, the party cadres could not organize adequately as they were under constant police pressure. İsmail Bilen, who would later become the TKP General Secretary, also joined the strike.

== Legacy ==
The strike, which took place in the early years of the Turkish Republic. Thanks to the strike, the tendency of the workers to the attitude taken by the government was better seen. In addition, the craftsmen and merchants of Adana did not accept the existence of a foreign company engaged in freight transportation and showed a side attitude towards the workers. The government, which did not want to damage the relations that were re-established with France after the Treaty of Lausanne, took sides with the railway company. In addition, this strike is important in that it is an action carried out jointly by civil servants, workers and part-time workers.

== Written work on the subject ==
There are very few written works on the subject. The primary source is the 47-page manuscripts written by Alaaddin, a member of the TKP, in Ottoman Turkish. Since the impartiality of these manuscripts, which were written in the form of diaries, is doubtful and there were various ruptures within the party at that time, it is necessary to reveal other impartial documents and information on the subject. Information on Müştak Bey, who was the governor of Adana at the time, is also limited.

== Literature ==
- 1927 Adana Demiryolu Grevi, Derleyen: Şeyda Oğuz, TÜSTAV Yayınları, Mayıs 2005
