= Nükhet Sirman =

Turkish social anthropologist

- Born: 1951
- Occupation: Social anthropologist

Academic background
- Education: Doctor of Philosophy
- Alma mater: University College London
- Thesis: Peasants and Family Farms: The Position of Households in Cotton Production in a Village of Western Turkey (1988)

Academic work
- Discipline: Anthropology; Sociology
- Sub-discipline: Ethnology; Social anthropology
- Institutions: Professor of anthropology at Department of Sociology, Boğaziçi University
- Main interests: Family and kinship Gender; Interpretive methods Postcolonial societies
- Notable ideas: Familial citizenship

Nükhet Sirman (born 1951) is a Turkish social anthropologist. She earned a doctorate degree from Britain's University College London in 1988, and since 1989, she is a professor of anthropology at the Boğaziçi University in Istanbul, Turkey. She has done academic analysis of the feminist movement in Turkey and introduced the concept of "familial citizenship" in the academic realm.

== Education and academic career ==
Sirman finished high school education at the American Robert College of Istanbul and did a B.A., M.A. and Ph.D. in anthropology at the University College London. She completed her Ph.D. in 1988 with the thesis titled Peasants and Family Farms: The Position of Households in Cotton Production in a Village of Western Turkey. It was an ethnographic study of the production of cotton in Turkey's Söke which detailed "the production and labor processes during the 1980s in terms of household". Since 1989, she is a professor of anthropology at sociology department of Boğaziçi University.

== Research ==
Sirman is a social anthropologist. Her research subjects include gender, establishment of gender identity, ethnic conflict, family and kinship, feminist theory, interpretive methods, postcolonial societies, rural sociology, and sociology of emotions. She has also studied "gender construction under nationalist discourses", "honor crimes and violence against women", "Kurdish women's movements", and "settlement of internally displaced persons".

=== Feminism ===
Sirman is a feminist. Between 1984 and 1991, she participated in Turkey's feminist movement, and she has carried out research on the life of women in Turkey. In her research on the feminist struggle, Sirman pointed out three movements which she considers as "standard reference points" in the study of feminism in Turkey. She views the resistance to the "Ottoman family system" by women "within the framework of proposed reforms to save the empire" during its final decades as the first, the according of numerous rights to women by the "modernizing Turkish state" as the second, and the "reaction" of women in opposition to "the patronizing role of the Turkish state in defining how women's liberation should look" that surfaced as an after-effect of the 1980 Turkish coup d'état as the third historically important movement. Sirman is of the view that the feminist movement in the 1980s was Turkish women's stand against the "Kemalist regime and the limitations of state feminism inspired by Kemalism". Some feminism and social science scholars are of the opinion that the leftist and Kemalist ideologies equally repress women's gender identity. Sirman suggests that though the "integration" of women in "traditional Islamic", "statist Kemalist" and "revolutionary leftist" ideologies made them enter the political arena, the feminist movement will gain momentum only when it would steer clear of these ideologies.

In her study on the "discursive and cultural productions" of nation state, Sirman has put forward the idea that "women were made part of the nation through the control of their bodies and, through cultural elaborations of femininity, the definition and control of the cultural boundaries of the nation".

=== Familial citizenship ===
Sirman studied Turkey's "nation-building discourse" which had established that a "sovereign" man and his "dependent" wife or mother are "ideal" citizens. In 2005, she devised the term "familial citizenship" to describe "a situation in which a position within a particular familial discourse provides the person with a status within the national polity." Daphna Hacker views Sirman's definition of the term as "relational and identity-based". Drawing from Christian Joppke's definition of citizenship as "membership in a State", Hacker herself applies a "physical-legal sense" to term "familial citizenship" and defines it as "the right of family members to be citizens of the same country, based on their family relations". "Familial citizenship" differs in meaning from the term "family citizenship" which was devised by Pierpaolo Donati in 1998. Donati wrote that "family citizenship means that the family as such must enjoy its own set of rights–obligations, as a reality of solidarity, and not simply as the sum of the rights–obligations of its individual members".

=== Law ===
From October 2016 to June 2017, Sirman worked on a research project titled Creating a Life Alongside the Law as a research fellow at the Nantes Institute for Advanced Study Foundation. In her research, she worked to present an ethnographic study report from her field study that was conducted in Turkey's Mersin where the Kurds have moved in to, and are not living within the bounds of official laws, after being "forcefully displaced from their villages in the 1990s". Sirman labored to answer — "what exactly is the law, and what does it mean to be alongside the law; and, secondly, what do we understand from the notion of "a life," what constitutes a life?"

== Selected papers ==
- Sirman, Nükhet (1989). "Feminism in Turkey: A Short History". New Perspectives on Turkey. 3. Cambridge University Press: 1–34. doi:10.15184/S0896634600000704. S2CID 147770162.
- Sirman, Nükhet (2004). "Kinship, Politics and Love: Honour in Post-colonial Contexts – The Case of Turkey". In Mojab, Shahrzad; Abdo-Zubi, Nahla (eds.). Violence in the Name of Honour: Theoretical and Political Challenges. Istanbul, Turkey: Istanbul Bilgi University Press. pp. 39–56. ISBN 978-9756857984. OCLC 1030075507.
- Sirman, Nükhet (1990). "State, Village and Gender in Western Turkey". In Finkel, Andrew; Sirman, Nükhet (eds.). Turkish State, Turkish Society (illustrated ed.). New York, USA: Routledge. pp. 21–51. ISBN 978-0415046855. LCCN 90031651. OCLC 912533333.
- Sirman, Nükhet (2000). "Gender Construction and Nationalist Discourse: Dethroning the Father in the Early Turkish Novel". In Güneş Ayata, Ayşe; Acar, Feride (eds.). Gender and Identity Construction: Women of Central Asia, the Caucasus and Turkey. Volume 68 of Social, Economic and Political Studies of the Middle East and Asia (illustrated ed.). Boston, Massachusetts, USA: Brill. pp. 162–176. ISBN 978-9004115613. LCCN 99033641. OCLC 1014522310.
- Sirman, Nükhet; Akınerdem, Feyza (2019). Özselçuk, Ceren; Küçük, Bülent (eds.). "From Seekers of Truth to Masters of Power: Televised Stories in a Post-Truth World". South Atlantic Quarterly. 118 (1): 129–144. doi:10.1215/00382876-7281648. S2CID 149510538.
- Sirman, Nükhet (October 2016). "When Antigone is a Man: Feminist "Trouble" in the Late Colony". In Butler, Judith; Gambetti, Zeynep; Sabsay, Leticia (eds.). Vulnerability in Resistance. Durham, North Carolina, USA: Duke University Press. pp. 191–210. doi:10.1215/9780822373490-010. ISBN 978-0822373490. LCCN 2016021707.

== See also ==
- Feminist anthropology
