= Women in Turkey =

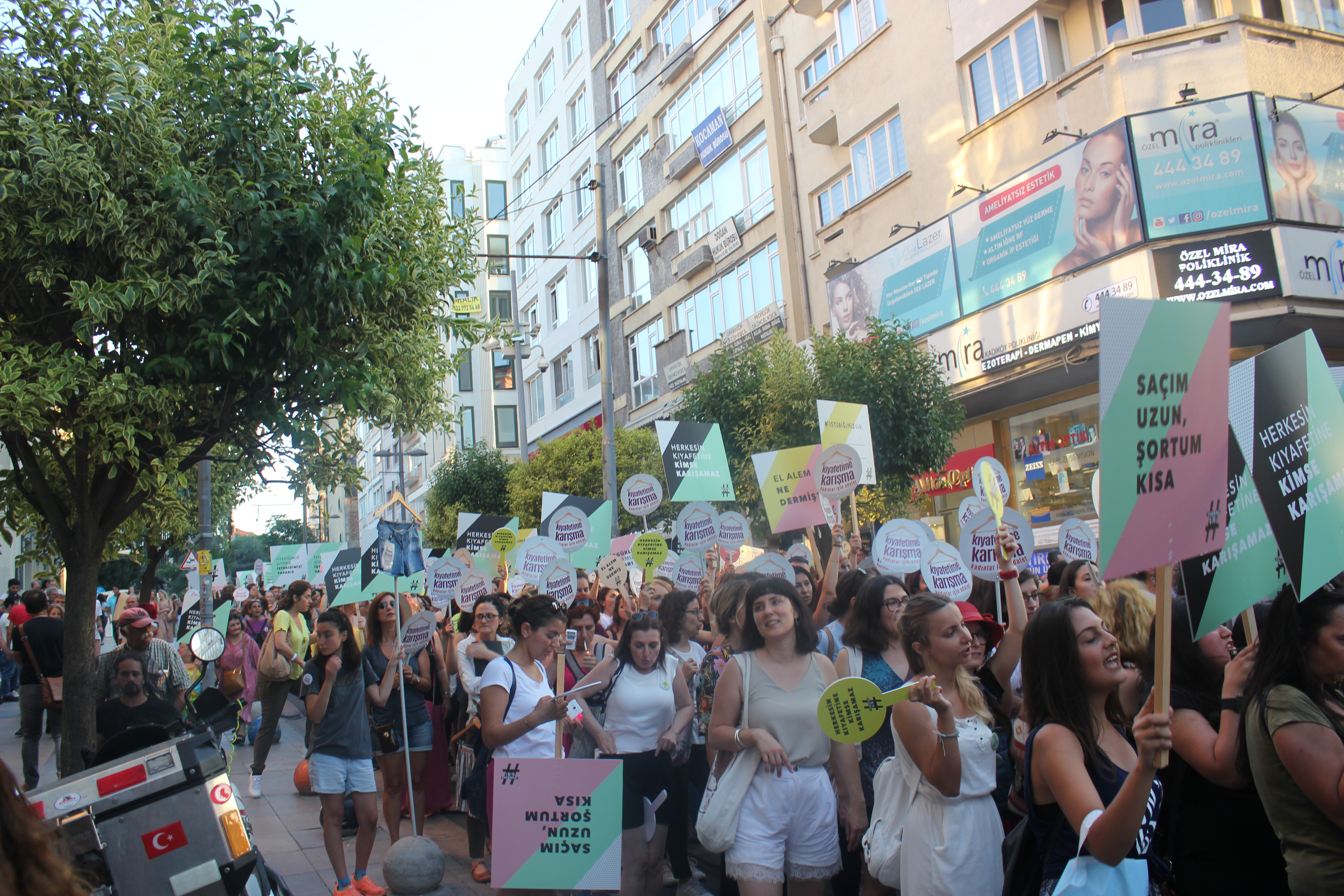
- Women protesting in Turkey

General statistics
- Maternal mortality (per 100,000): 20 (2010)
- Women in parliament: 20.1% (2023)
- Women over 25 with secondary education: 26.7% (2010)
- Women in labour force: 29.7% (employment rate OECD definition, 2020)

Gender Inequality Index
- Value: 0.272 (2021)
- Rank: 65th out of 191

Global Gender Gap Index
- Value: 0.639 (2022)
- Rank: 124th out of 146

Women in Turkey obtained full political participation rights, including the right to vote and run for office nationwide offices in 1934. Article 10 of the Turkish Constitution bans any discrimination, state or private, on the grounds of sex. It is the first country to have a woman as the President of its Constitutional Court. Article 41 of the Turkish Constitution reads that the family is "based on equality between spouses". However, 15% of girls in Turkey marry before the age of 18.

There are many historical examples of Turkish women involved in public life and activism. The Turkish feminist movement began in the 19th century during the decline of the Ottoman Empire when the Ottoman Welfare Organisation of Women was founded in 1908. The ideal of gender equality was embraced after the declaration of the Republic of Turkey by the administration of Mustafa Kemal Atatürk, whose modernising reforms included a ban on polygamy and the provision of full political rights to Turkish women by 1930.

Research by scholars and government agencies indicate widespread domestic violence among the people of Turkey, as well as in the Turkish diaspora. Turkey is the first and only country to withdraw from the Istanbul Convention, the Council of Europe Convention on Preventing and Combating Violence Against Women and Domestic Violence. It was estimated in 2012 that 40 percent of women have experienced physical sexual violence. The participation of Turkish women in the labour force stands at about 35 percent.

Women in Turkey face discrimination in employment, and, in some regions, education. The participation of Turkish women in the labor force is less than half of that of the European Union average, and while several campaigns have been successfully undertaken to promote female literacy, there is still a gender gap in secondary education.

== History ==
=== Sultanate of Women ===
In the course of the 16th and 17th centuries during the Sultanate of Women, some individual women of the Imperial Harem achieved an uncommon degree of influence on politics of the Ottoman Empire. The period started in 1520 during the reign of Suleiman the Magnificent until 1656, the reign of Mehmed IV.

The sultans did not fear their female relatives as much as they feared their male relatives, allowing women to become close advisers. Some of the Sultans during this time were minors and it was their mothers, like Kösem Sultan, who were the leaders of the Harem and effectively ruled the Empire, though at one time it was the daughter of the sultan, as with Mihrimah Sultan. Most of the sultan mothers were former concubines (sex slaves).

=== Decline of the Ottoman Empire ===
During the decline of the Ottoman Empire in the 19th century, educated women within the elite classes of Istanbul began to organise themselves as feminists. The first women's magazine, Terakki-i Muhadderat, appeared on 27 June 1869 as a weekly supplement to Terakki (Progress) newspaper.

With the Tanzimat reforms, improving women's conditions was considered as part of a wider modernisation effort. Ottoman women's movement began to demand rights. They fought to increase women's access to education and paid work, to abolish polygamy, and the peçe, an Islamic veil. Early feminists published woman magazines in different languages and established different organizations dedicated to the advancement of women. The first women's association in Turkey, the Ottoman Welfare Organization of Women, was founded in 1908 and became partially involved in the Young Turks Movement, and the Sade Giyinen Hanımlar Cemiyeti campaigned for the unveiling of women and their participation in public life.

Writers and politicians such as Fatma Aliye Topuz, Nezihe Muhiddin and Halide Edib Adıvar also joined the movement. In her novels, Halide Edib Adıvar criticised the low social status of Turkish women and what she saw as the lack of interest of most women in changing their situation. Nene Hatun became a folk heroine during Russo-Turkish War

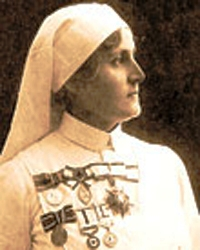
Safiye Ali, the first Turkish female doctor. She opened her office in Istanbul in 1922

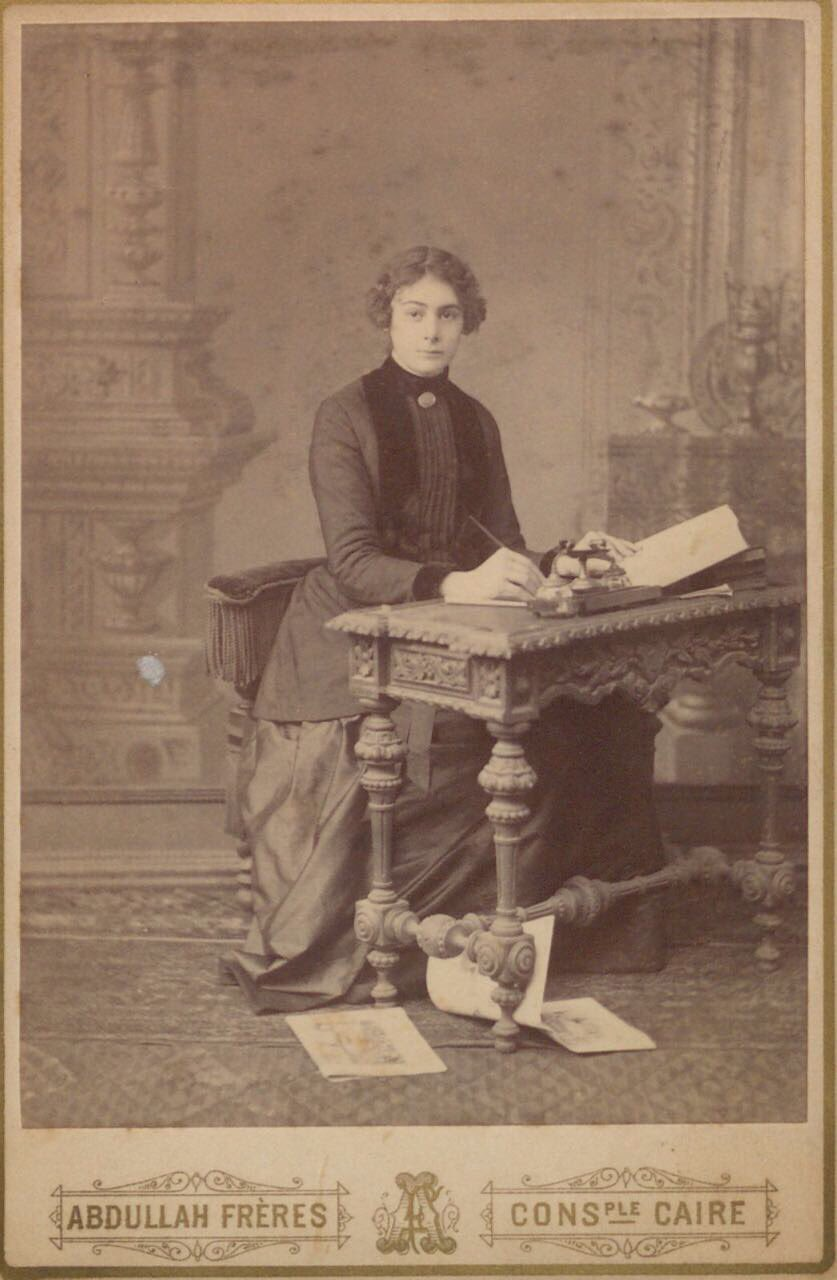
Selma Rıza, the first female Turkish journalist and an early novelist

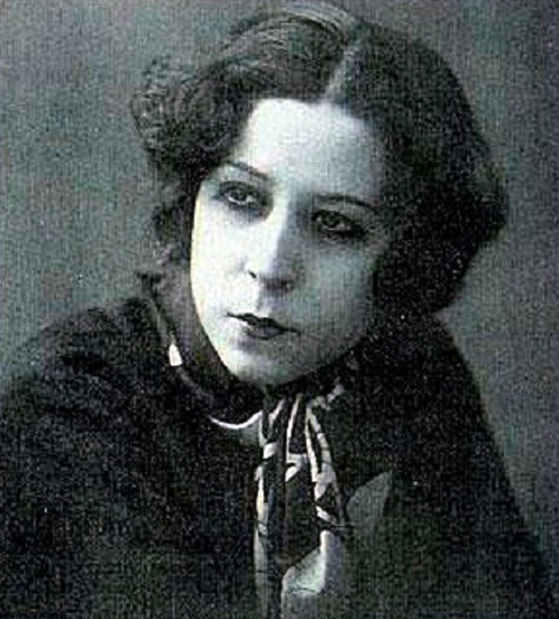
Afife Jale was the first Muslim theatre actress in Turkey

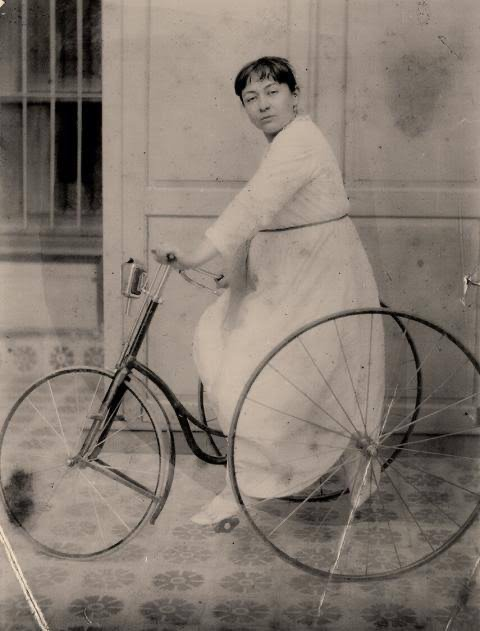
Fatma Aliye Topuz, first female novelist, and women's rights activist

=== Turkish Republic ===
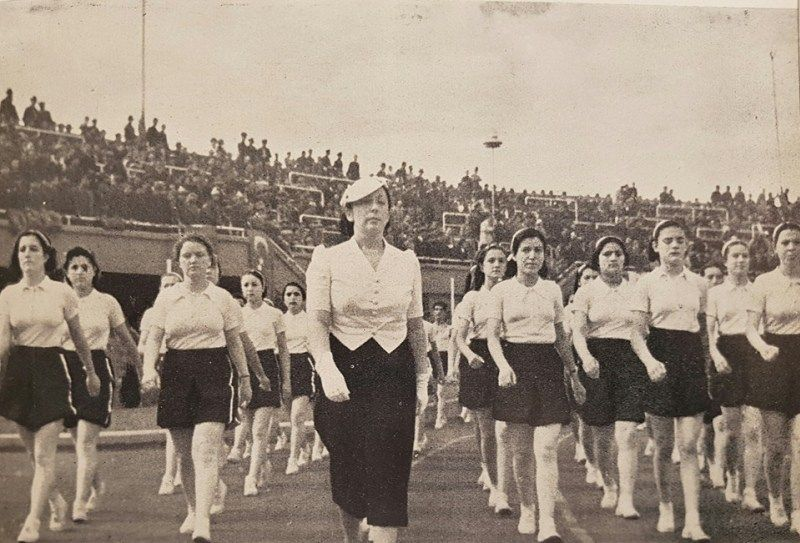
Turkish women in a holiday celebration in 1930s

During the Turkish War of Independence, Fatma Seher Erden, also called Kara Fatma, proved herself as a successful militia leader.

After the founding of the Turkish Republic in 1923, the feminist movement gradually became part of the Kemalist modernization efforts. Polygamy was banned, divorce and inheritance rights were made equal. Mustafa Kemal had the ambition to make Turkey a new modern secular nation. In 1925, the Turkish government introduced a new Family Law modelled after the Swiss Family Law, and in the same year, it banned the fez. In 1928, the Turkish government removed the official religion provision from the constitution.

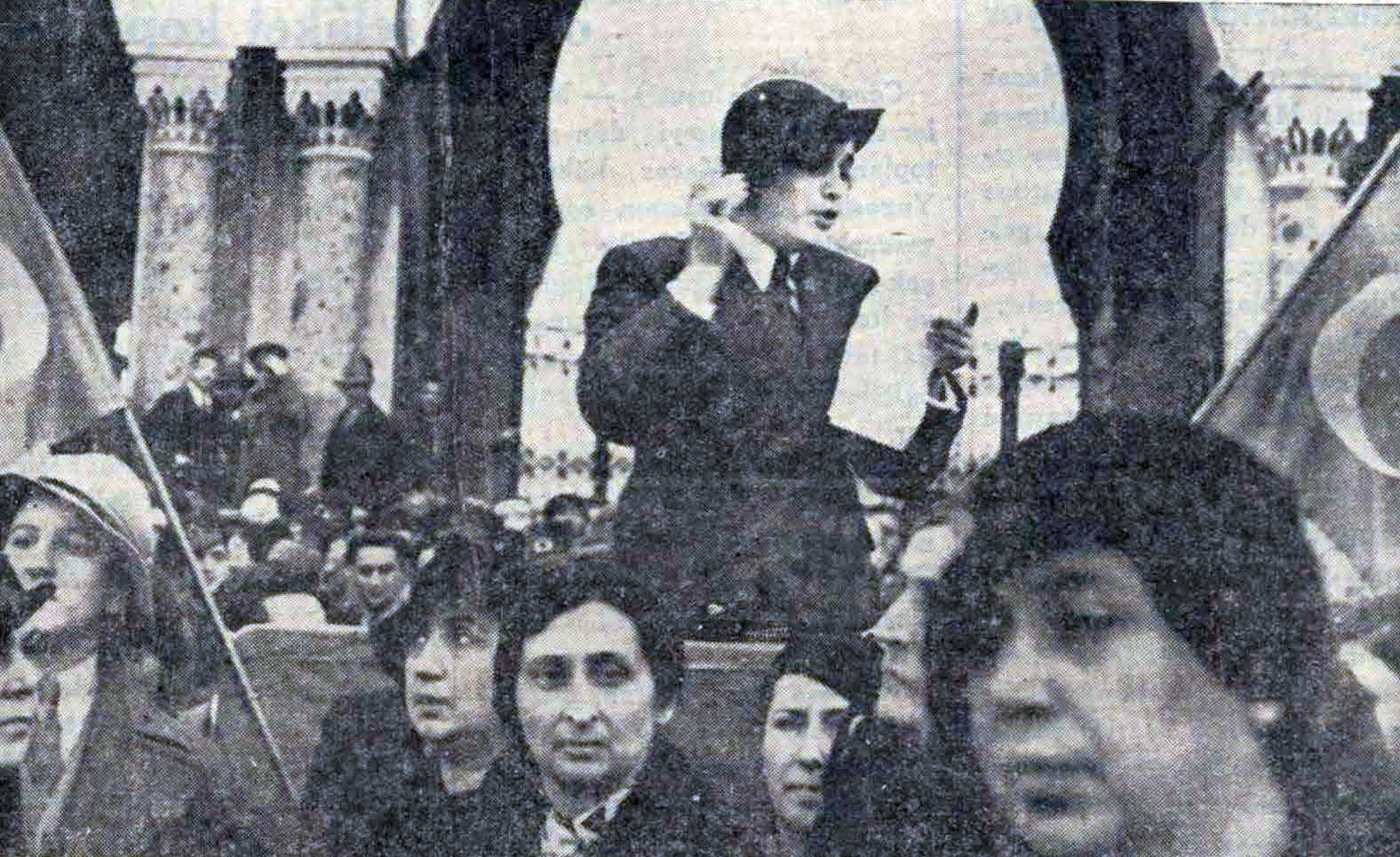
Photographs from the December 8, 1934, issue of Akşam newspaper, showing the Turkish Women's Union's rally in Beyazıt.

Mustafa Kemal viewed modern clothing as an essential visual symbol of the new secular nation and encouraged both women and men to wear modern fashion, but in contrast to his law against traditional wear (for example, the fez) for men, he never introduced a ban against the hijab. However, he appeared in public with his wife Latife Uşaki unveiled and arranged formal state receptions with dinner and dance were men and women could mingle, to encourage women to leave seclusion and adopt modern clothing, and in the mid-1920s, upper and middle class Turkish women started to appear unveiled in public. In the 1930s, Turkey gave full political rights to women, including the right to elect and be elected locally (in 1930) and nationwide (in 1934). Granted by Mustafa Kemal Atatürk, Turkish women gained women's suffrage before women in many European countries such as France, Italy and Greece. There still remained, however, a large discrepancy between formal rights and the social position of women.

In the 1980s, women's movements became more independent of the efforts to modify the state. After the 1980 Turkish coup d'état, women from both urban and academic milieus began to meet in reading groups and discuss feminist literature together. In these "awareness-raising groups", which were established notably in Istanbul, Ankara, and Izmir, they criticized the standard construction of the family as well as the gender-specific role behavior that was forced on women. The movement was criticized for being feminist because of western influence, of being middle class, as well as criticized by the socialists for being reformist and liberal. Independent feminist women's magazines were founded to expose the frequency of sexual harassment and violence against women. Şirin Tekeli, Stella Ovadia and Gülnur Savran were some notable women in the movement. They were part of the TUMAS trade union which they organized, which they hoped would be a democratic and egalitarian organization. The feminists published articles in Somut, which subsequently became the most widely spread paper among Turkish women.

According to an article by Charlotte Binder and Natalie Richman, in 1987 feminists organized the first public protest against male violence, followed by campaigns against sexual harassment, "purple needle" and campaigns seeking the right of self-determination over the female body. These campaigns arose due to women's wish to reject the traditional patriarchal code of ethics, honor, and religion, which left men to decide the fate of the female body. The second wave of the women's movement in Turkey reached a wider and more diverse group of women than the first women's movement.

The acceptance of women's issues as an independent political and planning problem was discussed for the first time in the Fifth Five Year Development Plan (1985–1990), and "the General Directorate for the Status and Problems of Women" was established as a national mechanism in 1990. The General Directorate, which was connected to the Prime Ministry in 1991, has been carrying out its activities under the responsibility of a State Ministry. It conducts a large variety of activities with the objectives of protecting women's rights, strengthening the position of women in social, economic, cultural, and political life, and providing the equal utilization of rights, opportunities, and capacities. Since the 1990s, feminist discourse has become institutionalized, with the foundation of women's studies centers and university programs at universities such as Marmara University and Istanbul University. In 1993, Tansu Çiller became the first female Prime Minister of Turkey.

In 2002, the Turkish government reformed Turkish criminal and civil law to equalize the rights of women and men during marriage, divorce, and any subsequent property rights. Additions to the Turkish constitution oblige the state to use all the necessary means to promote the equality of the sexes. Family courts were also created, labour laws were instituted to prohibit sexism, and programs were created to educate against domestic violence and improve access to education for girls.

In 2021, Turkey left the Convention on Preventing and Combating Violence against Women and Domestic Violence at the Istanbul Convention. In response CEDAW told the Turkish government to reverse its decision. A UN special rapporteur said that Turkey's abandonment of the convention "emboldened perpetrators" against women.

The Turkish government prohibited marching to commemorate International Women's Day, but despite the prohibition, several thousand women marched in Istanbul in March 2024.

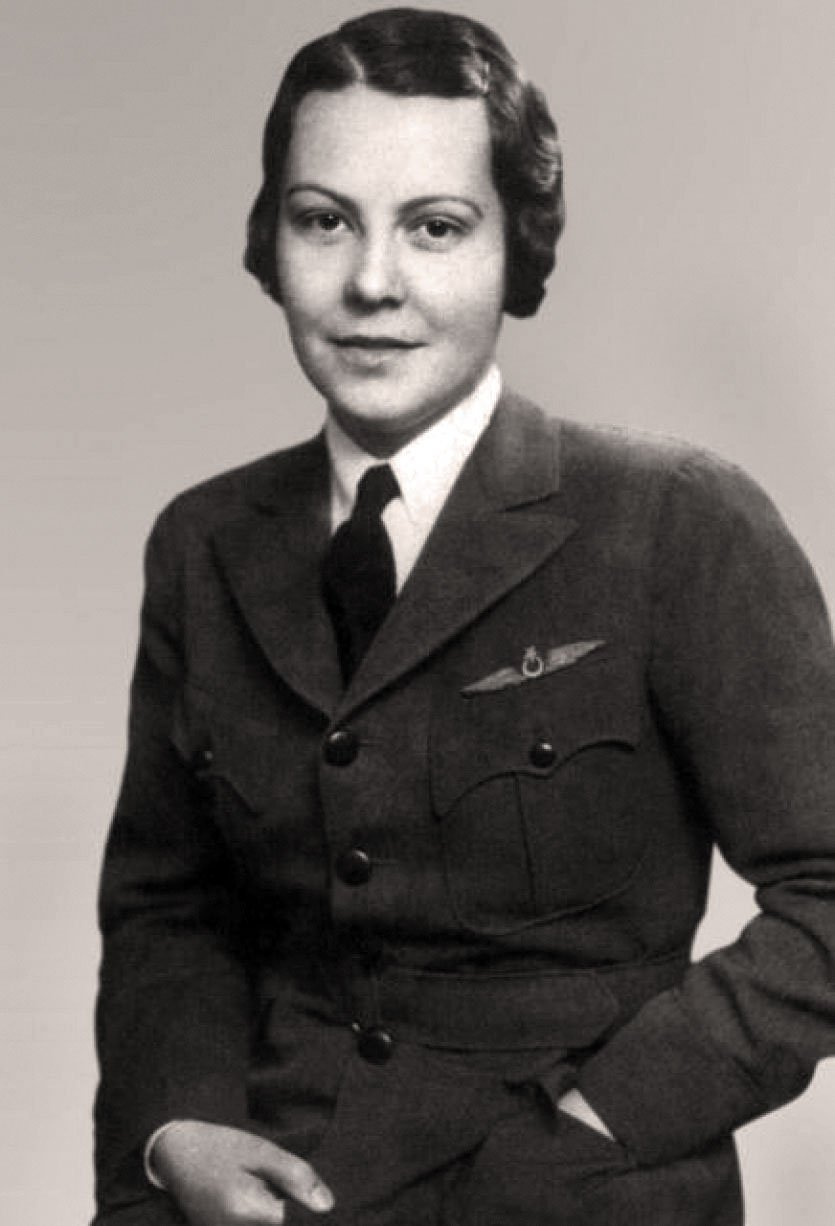
Sabiha Gökçen was the world's first female fighter pilot

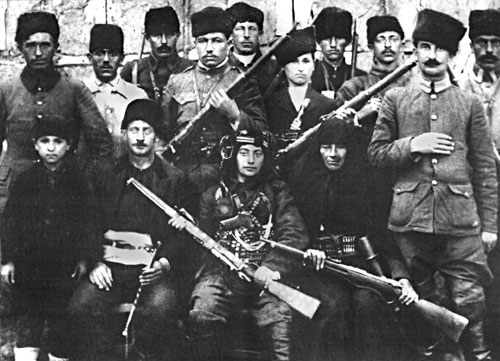
Kara Fatma, military commander

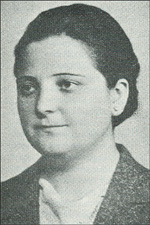
Afet İnan, co-founder of the Turkish Historical Society

== Legal rights ==
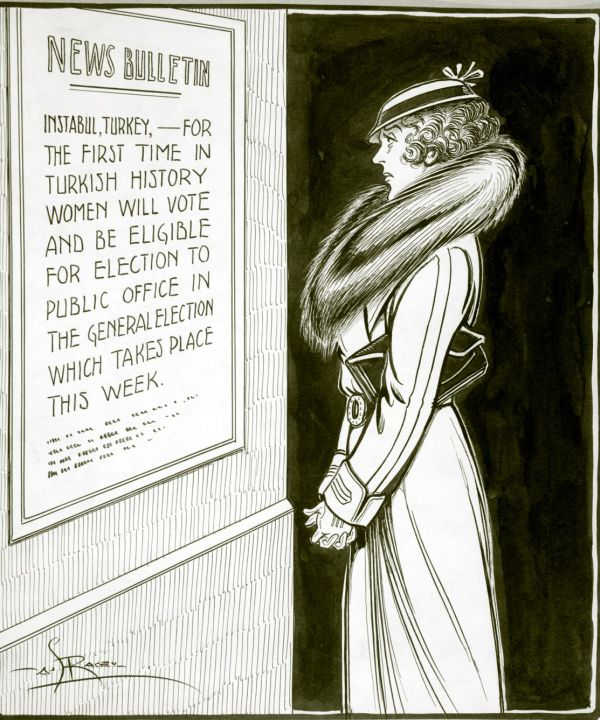
Canadian political cartoon of a woman in Quebec reading a sign that reads: "News bulletin: for the first time in Turkish history women will vote and be eligible to the public office in the general election which takes place this week." Women were granted the right to vote in Turkey in 1930, but the right to vote was not extended to women in provincial elections in Quebec until 1940.

Turkey is a party to the Convention on the Elimination of All Forms of Discrimination Against Women since 1985, as well as to its Optional Protocol since 2002.

Article 10 of the Turkish Constitution bans any discrimination, state or private, on the grounds of sex. It is the first country which had a woman as the President of its Constitutional Court, Tülay Tuğcu. In addition, Turkish Council of State, the supreme court for administrative cases, also has a woman judge Sumru Çörtoğlu as its president.

The article 41 of the Turkish Constitution was revised to read that the family is "based on equality between spouses". The new code also granted women equal rights to property acquired during marriage, which was supposedly meant to give economic value to women's labor within the family household.

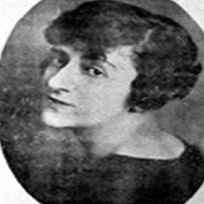
Nezihe Muhiddin, one of leading names of the First Wave Republican feminists. She completed the formation of Women's People Party

The minimum age for marriage was also raised to 18 (17 with parental consent). In cases of forced marriage, women have right to ask an annulment within the first five years of marriage. In 2004, an update to article 10 of the constitution placed the responsibility for establishing gender equality on the state: "men and women have equal rights. The state shall have the obligation to ensure that this equality exists in practice".

In 2005, the Turkish penal code was changed to criminalize marital rape and harshen the sentences for those convicted of honor killings, which previously carried reduced sentenced because of "provocation". The Human Rights Directorate reported that the number of honor killings committed in Turkey rose to 220 in 2007, with most of the killings occurring in major cities.

The Islamic headscarf, worn by 20% of Turkish women, is allowed to women working in public offices during the practice of their functions. Girl students in primary and secondary education also are allowed to use headscarf.

== Politics ==
=== Feminism ===
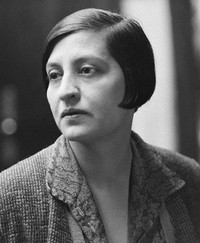
Halide Edib Adıvar. Turkish novelist and feminist political leader.

The first wave of Turkish feminism occurred in the early 20th century, when women's organizations began to demand equality in civic and political rights. An important women's organization was the Ottoman Society for the Defense of Women's Rights, which was and its organ, the journal Kadınlar Dünyası (Women's World) was established in 1913.

After the establishment of the Republic, the women's movement organized in the Women's People Party, which was transformed in to the Turkish Women's Union in 1924, which worked for women's suffrage in the new modern state. During this early period, the women's rights claims overlapped with the Kemalist reform process in the aftermath of the Republic.

On 17 November 1972, National Women's Party of Turkey founded by Mübeccel Göktuna Törüner in İstanbul. Although Turkish women gained universal suffrage in 1934, in the 1970s women's participation in Turkish politics was very low.

Second wave feminism reached Turkey in the 1980s, bringing up issues common to the movement which had emerged in the West in the 1960s, such as the elimination of violence against women, the oppression experienced in the family and the challenge against virginity tests, then a common practice for women who were about to get married or who had been subjected to sexual assault.

The rise of a global civil society and the internationalization of women's organizations and the accession of Turkey to the European Union have given women's organizations the possibility of accessing foreign funds. The number of women's organizations as well as the projects that these organizations conduct have increased. On the 23 July 1995, it was allowed for political parties to form women's branches, which beforehand was banned in the Turkish constitution of 1982.

=== Political representation ===
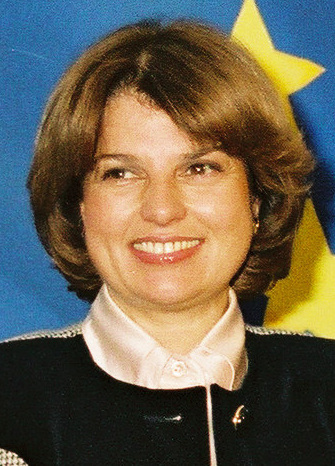
Tansu Çiller, the first female Prime Minister of Turkey, from 1993 to 1996.

In 1930s, Turkish women entered politics for the first time. The first elected female mayor in Turkey was Sadiye Hanım (1930). In the elections held on 8 February 1935 18 women entered the parliament. One of them, Hatı Çırpan was a muhtar (village head) of a village prior to entrance to parliament. The first female city mayor was Müfide İlhan in 1950. Although representation of women in political and decision-making bodies is relatively low, Tansu Çiller has been prime minister between 1993 and 1996. The number of women in the Turkish parliament has increased to 14.3% after the 2011 Turkish general election (79 individuals in the parliament), most of them are affiliated with the Justice and Development Party. In 1975 the percentage was 10.9 and in 2006 it was 16.3. Only 5.58 percent of mayors are women and in the whole of Turkey there is one governor (among 81) and 14 local governors.

== Crime against women ==
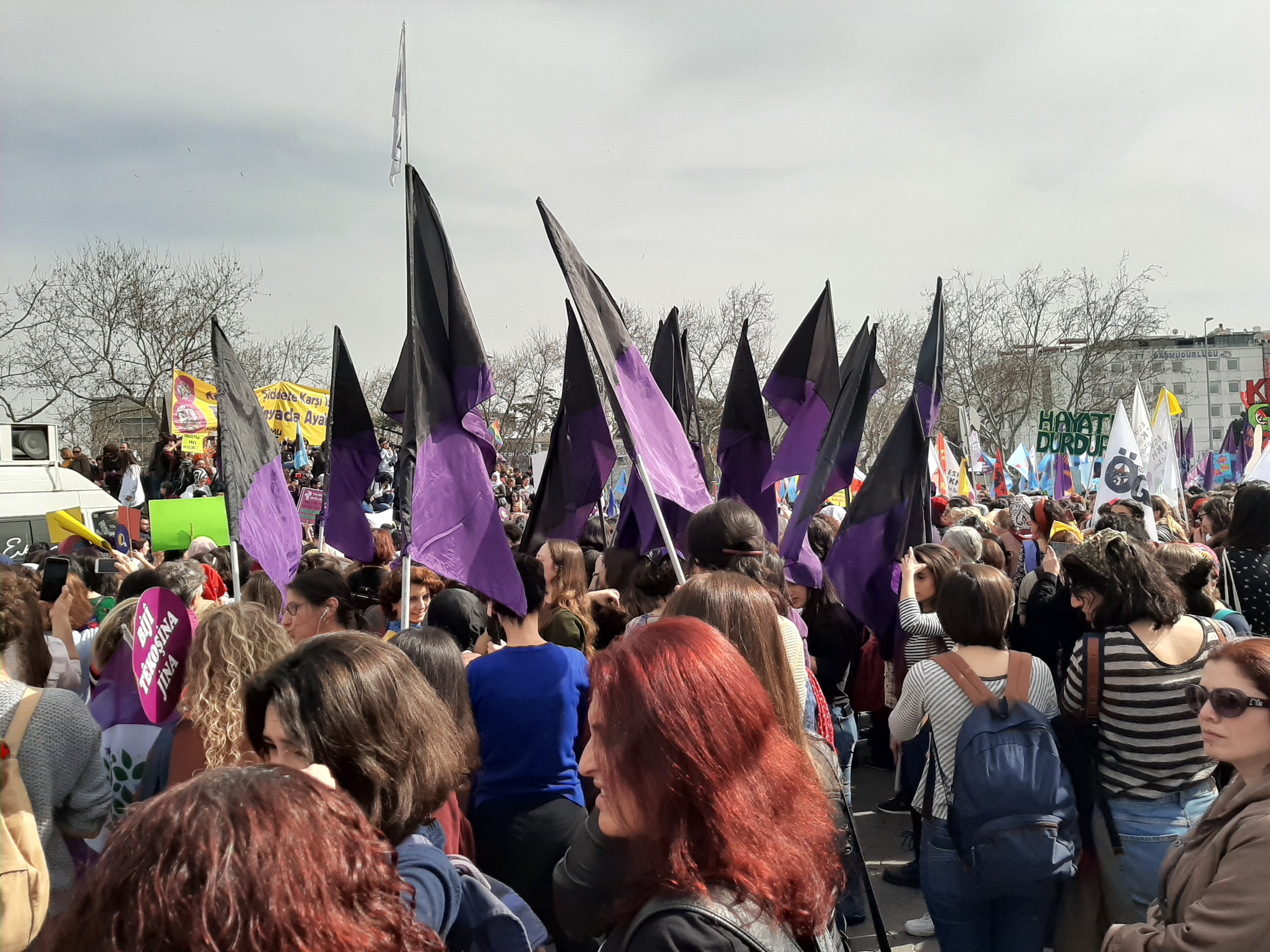
International Women's Day Protests in Turkey.

Because Turkey does not keep official statistics on femicide and does not release any regular data about murders of women, most of the statistics comes from human rights NGOs which jointly try to collect the data.

In March 2018, Turkish police launched the "Women Emergency Assistance Notification System" (KADES) app for women to report cases of domestic violence and seek assistance faster. In November 2018, the Turkish Interior Minister Süleyman Soylu said that the app has been downloaded by over 353,000 people. The murders of women in Turkey increased from 66 in 2002 to 953 in the first seven months of 2009. In the Eastern and Southeastern Anatolia regions in particular, women face domestic violence, forced marriages, and honor killings. Şefkat-Der, a Turkish non-governmental organization, has suggested granting licensed, tax-free guns to women as a way to combat domestic violence. On 8 March 2017, a mob illegally entered the Istanbul Bilgi University campus and attacked students celebrating International Women's Day, also, students mentioned that they had been threatened on Twitter before the incident. Between 2002 and 2009, the murder rate of women skyrocketed by 1,400 percent. On 2010, the Turkish anti-violence group Mor Cati created a video attempted to raise awareness of violence toward women in a public way. The group placed large posters of women jumping for joy, their arms and legs splayed out beyond the frame's borders, all around Istanbul. The text next to the women reads, "I want to live in freedom." The organization then set up hidden video cameras, which purport to show male passersby kicking and ripping off the cutouts' arms and legs. In 2013, about 28,000 women were assaulted, according to official figures. Of those, more than 214 were murdered, monitors say, normally by husbands or lovers.

In November 2015, Izmir Bar Association's Women's Rights and Legal Support Office said that the last decade has not only seen the increase in the numbers of women subject to violence, but that the violence itself has become more intense and barbaric, "bordering on torture." They also stated that the number of femicides in the last few years has ranged between 5,000 and 6,000, adding that the State either cannot or do not disclose exact records, so different platforms try to fill in this gap in terms of adequate data through media monitoring,". The journalist Ceyda Ulukaya, made an interactive ""Femicide Map" of Turkey. The project, supported by the Platform for Independent Journalism, contains detailed data about 1,134 femicide victims between 2010 and 2015, including the victims, the identity of the accused/murderer, the reason and links to newspaper stories about their murders. Both qualitative and quantitative data showed that the majority of the victims were killed by husbands/ex-husbands (608 cases) and boyfriends/ex-boyfriends (161). The most often-cited reason of the murder is that the woman wanted a divorce or refused reconciliation.

On 15 March 2017, Turkish Interior Ministry has announced that a total of 20 women were killed while under temporary state protection between 2015 and 2017. An average of 358 women a day applied to law enforcement officers after suffering violence in 2016. Around five women every hour, or 115 a day, were faced with the threat of murder. The Umut Foundation released statistics regarding violence against women in Turkey on International Women's Day, showing that 397 women were killed in Turkey in 2016. A total of 317 women were killed with weapons in 2016, an increase over the 309 women killed with weapons – out of a total of 413 – in 2015. On 6 July 2017, a pregnant Syrian woman was raped and killed with her 10-month-old baby in the Sakarya Province, Turkey.

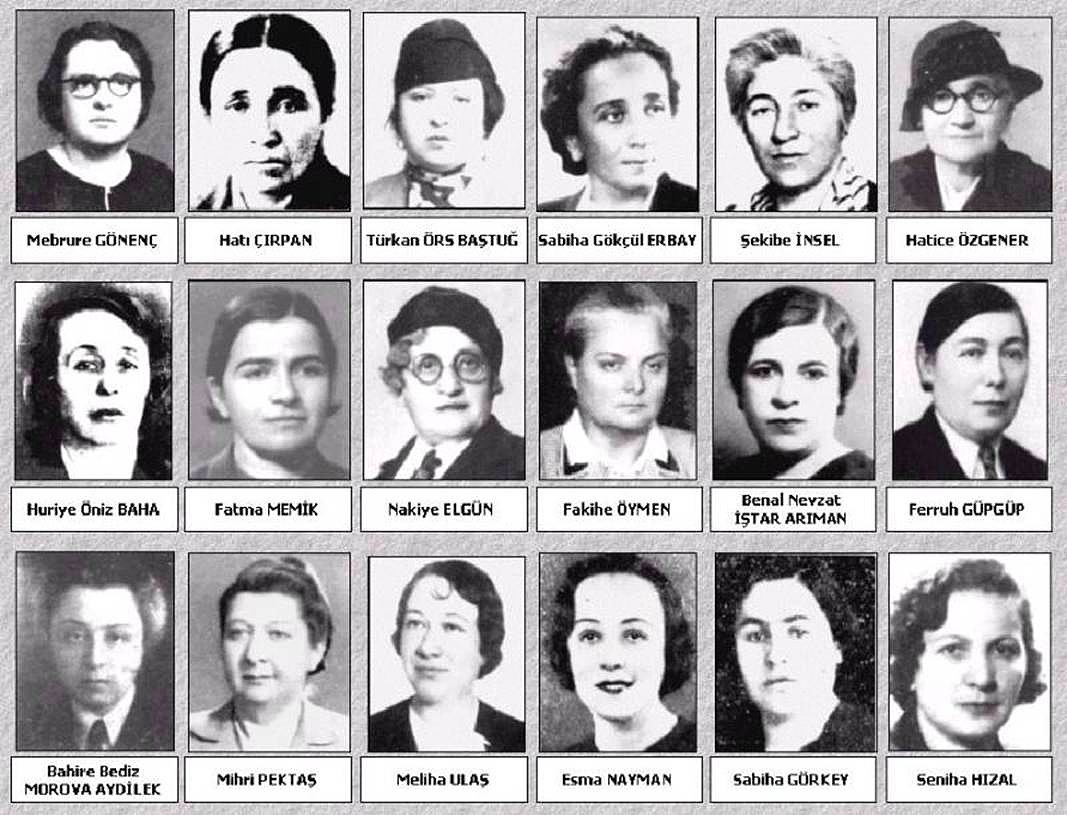
The first female MPs Republic of Turkey (1935). Top row (left to right): Mebrure Gönenç (Afyon), Hatı Çırpan (Ankara), Türkan Örs Baştuğ (Antalya), Sabiha Gökçül Erbay (Balıkesir), Şekibe İnsel (Bursa), Hatice Özgener (Çankırı) Middle row (left to right): Huriye Baha Öniz (Diyarbakır), Fatma Şakir Memik (Edirne), Nakiye Elgün (Erzurum), Fakihe Öymen (Ankara), Benal Nevzat İstar Arıman (İzmir), Ferruh Güpgüp (Kayseri) Bottom row (left to right): Bahire Bediş Morova Aydilek (Konya), Mihri Pektaş (Malatya), Meliha Ulaş (Samsun), Fatma Esma Nayman (Seyhan), Hatice Sabiha Görkey (Sivas), Seniha Nafız Hızal (Trabzon)

In the monthly report of the group "We Will Stop Femicide", in May 2017, it mentions that 328 women were killed in 2016 while in the first five months of 2017, 173 women were killed across Turkey compared with 137 in the same period of 2016. 210 Turkish women were killed or forced to commit suicide in 2012 in misogynist attacks by men. Women's activists said that the rise in killings had come as more women sought to exercise their rights, including divorcing abusive partners. 294 women killed in 2014 and 237 in 2013. From 2010 till May 2017, 118 women have been killed in İzmir alone. In December 2016, a man attacked a pregnant woman, in Manisa for jogging at a park. According to reports monitoring the number of women killed at the hands of abusive men, 41 women were killed in August 2018 in Turkey. Unofficial data compiled by a Turkish advocacy group reported that in 2018, 440 women in Turkey murdered by men. In 2019, the eight women lawmakers from the main opposition staged a protest in Turkey's general assembly. They were banging their desks and singing the "A Rapist in Your Path", while some other lawmakers stood up and held around 20 pictures of victims of femicide in Turkey. According to the We Will Stop Femicides Platform (Kadın Cinayetlerini Durduracağız Platformu), more than 157 women were murdered by men in Turkey from January 2020 - July 2020.

On the 14 March 2012, Turkey was the first country to ratify the Istanbul Convention, the Council of Europe Convention on Preventing and Combating Violence Against Women and Domestic Violence,. The convention entered into effect on the 1 August 2014 as on this date enough member states ratified the Istanbul convention. In July 2020, the deputy chair Numan Kurtulmuş of the Turkish ruling party (Justice and Development Party (AKP)) said that Turkey's 2012 decision of ratifying the convention was wrong, adding that Turkey might consider withdrawing from it. In the same month, the leader of the main opposition party in Turkey (CHP) said that there is a rise in violence against women in the country. World famous celebrities have joined Turkish women's social media campaign with the hashtag #ChallengeAccepted, in order to put an end to domestic violence in Turkey. Despite resistance from the opposition, the Turkish Government of Recep Tayyip Erdoğan decided to withdraw from the Istanbul Convention in March 2021.

=== Domestic violence ===
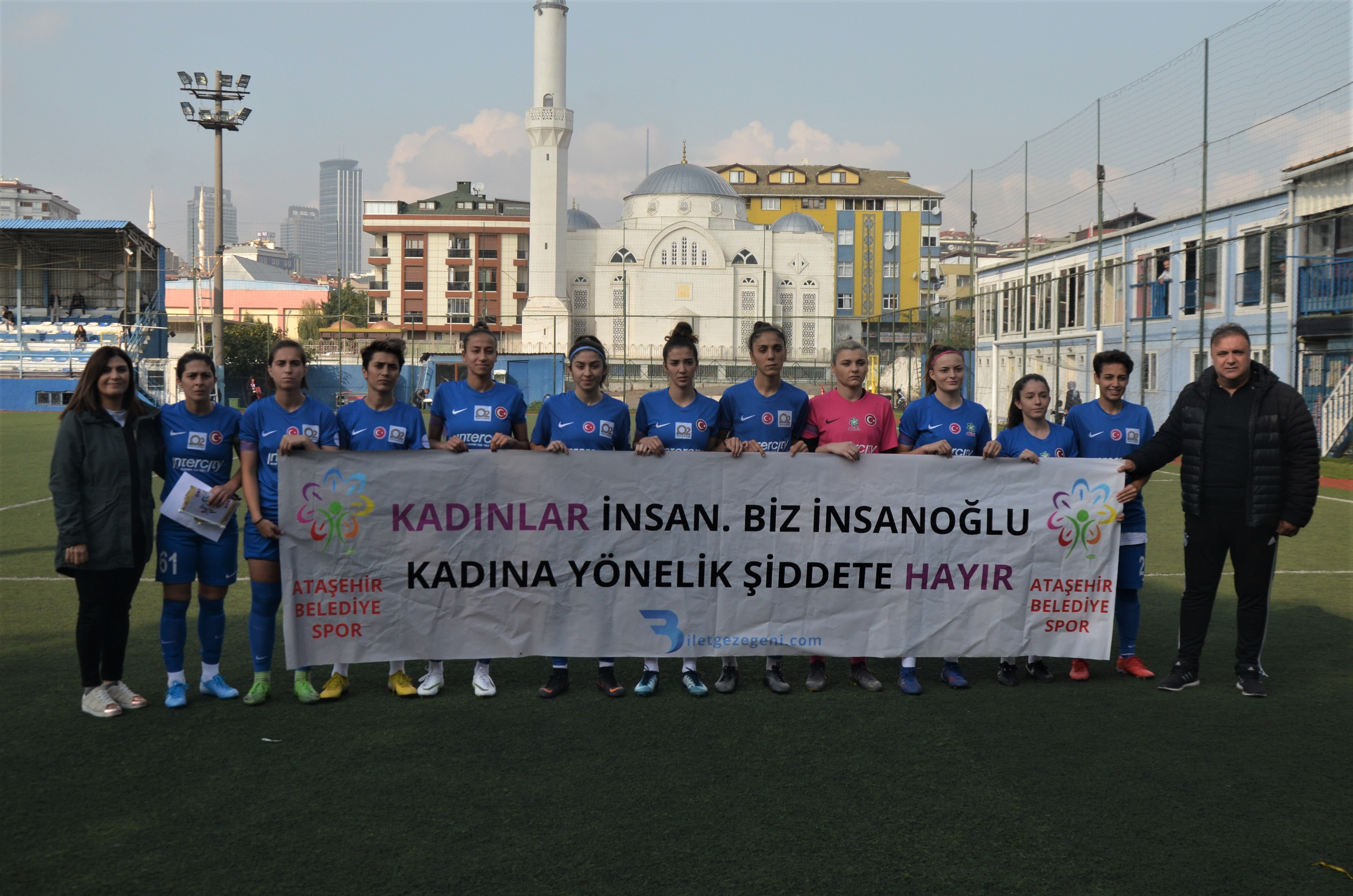
Ataşehir Belediyespor protesting against violence against women

A 2002 study by Ayranci, et al. observed that in Turkey, 36.4% of women reported physical violence and 71% mentioned physical, psychological or sexual assault during pregnancy.

According to report by the Turkish government dating from 2009, 42% of the surveyed women said they had been physically or sexually abused by their husband or partner. Nearly half of the victims never spoke to anyone about their abuse, and only 8% approached government institutions for support. When women do approach them, police and gendarmerie tend towards attempting to "reconcile" the families rather than protecting the female victims. While the rates of violence are particularly high among poor, rural women, one third of the women in the highest economic brackets have also been subject to domestic violence.

A 2009 survey conducted by a leading Turkish university stated that some 42 percent of women over age 15 in Turkey and 47 percent of rural women have experienced physical or sexual violence at the hands of a husband or partner at some point in their lives.

According to a United Nations report published in July 2011, 39% of women in Turkey have suffered physical abuse at some time in their lives, compared with 22% in the United States. Even though every municipality with more than 50,000 inhabitants is required by law to have at least one women's shelter, there are just 79 in the whole country. In May 2011, the Human Rights Watch said in a report that Turkey's flawed family violence protection system leaves women and girls across the country unprotected against domestic abuse. The 58-page report, "'He Loves You, He Beats You': Family Violence in Turkey and Access to Protection," documents brutal and long-lasting violence against women and girls by husbands, partners, and family members and the survivors' struggle to seek protection.

Over 37% of Turkish women said that they had experienced physical or sexual violence – or both – according to an exhaustive 2014 survey of 15,000 households by the country's family ministry. According to the We Will Stop Women Homicides Platform, 294 women were killed in 2014, and 60% of them perished at the hands of husbands and boyfriends. On 3 October 2017, a woman who took refuge in a women's shelter due to being subjected to violence from her husband was killed by him at Kastamonu.

On 9 October 2017, Habertürk reported that the number of electronic bracelets given for domestic violence incidents throughout Turkey is only 30, although some 120,000 women are subjected to violence by men every year in the Turkey. In November 2017, according to a study conducted by a student at Muğla Sıtkı Koçman University, mentioned that 28.5 percent of the respondents said they have witnessed domestic abuse. In the same study 52.9 percent of those who were involved in a relationship said they were subjected to "dating abuse," described in the report as "psychological harassment or physical aggression." The report also revealed that 6.25 percent of victims said they were touched without their consent and 4.54 said they were raped. The study also showed that abusers are overwhelmingly men.

A total of 365 women were killed by men in the first 11 months of 2017, according to data compiled by the "We Will Stop Femicide" activist platform based on news reported in the media. The report also stressed that women who are victims of sexual abuse tend to be neglected by their families, which pushes them to undertake independent measures for their self-protection. Among many victimized women, some end up committing suicide. The report stated that 2017, as of November, 15 percent of the women killed were victims of murder for "wanting to get a divorce," 11 percent were killed for "taking decisions about their lives independently," 7 percent were killed for "financial reasons," 4 percent were killed for "turning down [the man's] reconciliation efforts," and another 4 percent were killed over "debates about their children." Most of the women killed in Turkey in November were aged between 25 and 35, with 75 percent of the women in this age range becoming victims after wanting to get divorce. In 2017, a total of 409 women were killed and 387 children sexually abused in Turkey, according to data compiled by the group "We Will Stop Femicide". A report about October 2017 reveals that during that month 40 women have lost their lives due to femicide, while 25 women have been subject to sexual violence and 32 children have been sexually abused. Also, 20% of women who have been murdered, range between 19 and 24. In addition the report mention that 70% of victims have been murdered by their close relatives (partner, father, son, brother, etc.), and that 40% of victims have been shot dead, whereas 28% have been stabbed to death.

According to a report released by the group "We Will Stop Femicide", 28 women were killed and 25 others were subjected to sexual violence in January 2018, added that also 147 children had been sexually abused during January. Twenty one percent of the women killed were murdered for making decisions regarding their own lives, while four percent of women were murdered for refusing to reunite with their former partners. 43 percent were between 36 and 65 years old, 14 percent were older than 66, and 11 percent were between 25 and 35 years old. The majority of the women were killed at home. The platform said the total number of femicides fell slightly compared to the final months of 2017.

A 2020 study investigated the relationship between femicides and economic development in Turkey. Using data from the 2010-2017 period, it found that "whether economic development reduces femicide depends on other factors: in poorer provinces, there is a strong positive correlation between women's murders and equality in education and divorce rates, but in richer provinces, these associations are significantly weaker." It concluded that "These results are consistent with the idea that economic development may not reduce women's murders by itself, but it can mitigate the effects of male backlash against women who challenge the status quo."

=== Monument Counter ===
The Monument Counter is an online Internet monument commemorating women who have lost their lives to domestic and male violence. It is updated every day. It was conceived in 2012 as a device to generate public awareness concerning the rising number of deaths due to domestic violence and to keep track of this data that is often suppressed, and largely unknown. The website, clearly setting out on its homepage all the names of the women who were murdered, also features a large active counter. Not only is it an awareness raising mechanism for society around domestic violence, but it is also a space for commemoration and mourning. The Monument Counter demonstrates a worrying increase, as well as inviting an urgent countdown. Each name is backed by a news article, with a focus on increasing knowledge and ensuring verifiability. At the time of writing (26.05.2021), the counter is at 162 women thus far for the year of 2021.

=== Violence for choice of clothing ===
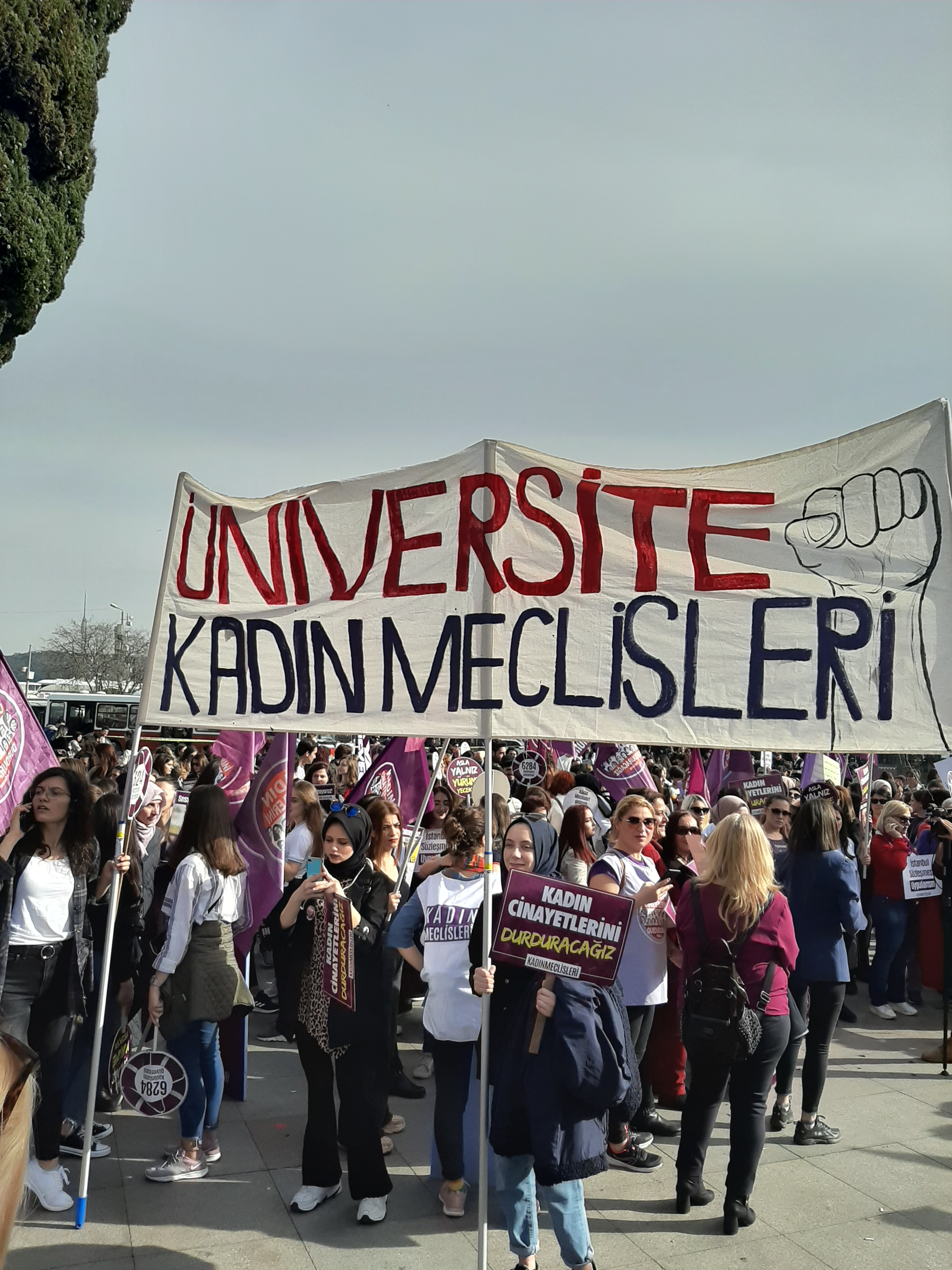
Protest during women's day

In September 2016, Ayşegül Terzi was called a "devil" and kicked by a man in face on a public bus for wearing shorts. Footage showed the man telling her that those who wear shorts "should die." In protest at the attack, the hashtag #AyşegülTerzininSesiOlalim, which translates into English as "let's be the voice of Aysegul Terzi", was used thousands of times. Women in Turkey also posted images to social media of themselves wearing shorts in solidarity. On 18 September 2016, campaigners gathered in Istanbul to protest the attack and put pressure on authorities to focus on ending violence against women.

In June 2017, a female university student, Asena Melisa Sağlam, was attacked verbally and physically by a man on a bus in Istanbul for wearing shorts during the Muslim holy month of Ramadan. The incident was caught on security cameras. Also, later on the same month a woman was harassed on the street in Istanbul when a man accused her of wearing provocative clothing, saying she should be careful because she was "turning people on."

In July 2017, hundreds of women marched in Istanbul on to protest against violence and animosity they face from men demanding they dress more conservatively. Protesters say there has been an increase in the number of verbal and physical attacks against women for their choice of clothing in Turkey in recent years. Also, later on the same month the security chief of the Maçka Democracy Park in the Şişli district of Istanbul verbally abused a young woman for the way she was dressed and he also called the police. On 30 July 2017, Women's rights associations protested in the Park against such actions.

On 10 August 2017, two men on motorbikes sexually harassed two women, at İzmir. Then the women asked for help from two police officers in the street, but one of them started beating one of the women, according to the woman's testimony the "officer said the harassers were right because we were 'dressed inappropriately'". Security footage showed one of the police officers starting to beat one of the women. In September 2017, at Ankara, neighbors complained to the manager of an apartment building about a woman for wearing shorts at her home, demanding that she must keep her curtains closed. The manager warned the woman to keep her curtains closed for her own sake. In March 2018, a teacher at a religious vocational high school in Konya was dismissed from his post over comments he made about female students wearing gym clothes. He also wrote that physical education classes should be an optional class for students, as it "prepared girls for the devil".

=== Rape ===
Turkey outlawed marital rape in 2005.

Reporting on cases of sexual abuse in Turkey is often difficult; the issue is still taboo in Turkish culture, as well as the fact that much of Turkish media don't report on such cases as they tarnish the country's modern and secular image. The result of this is that many injustices within Turkey, including systematic rapes carried out in prisons to maintain power over communities, go unheard by the rest of the world.

=== Honor killings ===
According to researchers, one of the important reasons for the high number of honor killings is that punishments are not harsh and laws and legal applications protect the perpetrators. Between 2003 and 2007, 432 (58.5%) of 739 honor killings were committed in İstanbul (167 persons), Ankara (144 persons) and İzmir (121 persons).

A July 2008 Turkish study by a team from Dicle University on honor killings in rural Anatolia has so far shown that little if any social stigma is attached to honor killing. The team interviewed 180 perpetrators of honor killings and it also commented that the practice is not related to a feudal societal structure, "there are also perpetrators who are well-educated university graduates. Of all those surveyed perpetrators, 60 percent are either high school or university graduates or at the very least, literate".

A June 2008 report by the Turkish Prime Ministry's Human Rights Directorate said that in Istanbul alone there was one honor killing every week, and reported over 1,000 during the previous five years. Istanbul, Ankara, Izmir, and Bursa having the highest numbers of reported honor killings.

=== Human trafficking ===
In 2008, critics have pointed out that Turkey has become a major market for foreign women who are coaxed and forcibly brought to the country by international mafia to work as sex slaves, especially in big and touristic cities.

=== Sexual harassment ===
On 15 February 2015, a social media campaign started in order to let women share their own sexual harassment stories under the hashtag #sendeanlat (you tell your story too), after a 20-year-old woman was brutally killed in Turkey. As of 25 February 2015, there were more than 800,000 tweets.

In 2015, the Turkish model, Didem Soydan, tweeted that she had received abusive text messages, after testifying and giving her cell phone number to police in the case of a woman who was forced into a car after being beaten. In addition, the actress Beren Saat, tweeted her own experiences about the sexual harassment and abuses. In June 2018, the Turkish actress Hande Ataizi and a Turkish costume assistant accused the actor Talat Bulut of sexual harassment. A total of 56 producers and directors in Turkey supported the victims with a written statement. In the statement it mention that: "We know it is hard for a woman to expose harassment and abuse incidents in Turkey". The male actor had rejected the allegations and threatened to launch a countersuit.

=== Women's shelters ===
As of September 2018, there are a total of 132 women's shelters in Turkey. Only the province of Bitlis does not have a shelter for women. Most of those facilities are run by the Family, Labor and Social Services Ministry while others are operated by municipalities, the Immigration Authority (Göç İdaresi) and the Purple Roof (Mor Çatı), an NGO. According to data from 2016, 102 shelters under the Family Ministry accommodated 29,612 women and 17,956 children. Thirty-three facilities operated by municipalities sheltered 2,088 women and 1,433 children. And 66 women and 23 children were hosted at the shelter run by the NGO.

Aslı Elif Sakallı, from the Purple Roof Women's Shelter Foundation, said that only one or two social workers are employed at shelters that host 25 to 30 women. She also added that some employees at the shelters who are not conscious about gender equality could make statements such as: "But clearly you deserved this".

== Religious officials and women ==
In 2017, the mufti of the Kocaeli's Gölcük district had likened women without headscarves to products sold at half price. In 2018, the mufti of the Zonguldak said that "Women should enter the sea in a way that other women cannot see them. Even women should hide their bodies from other women."

== Education ==
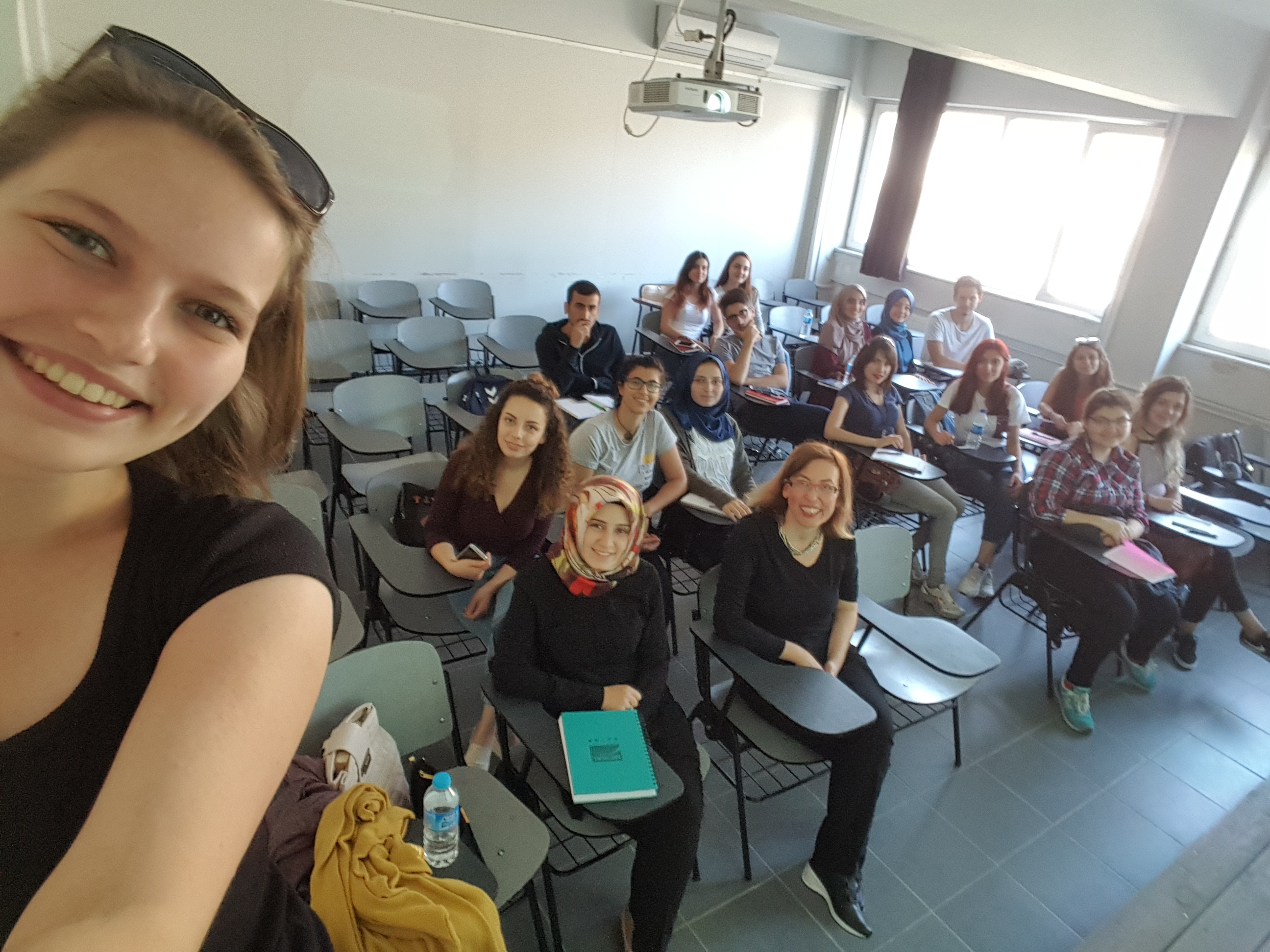
A scene from a female-majority class at the Psychology Department of Uludağ University in Bursa, Turkey. In Turkey, 47.5% of staff at the top five universities are female, a higher proportion than for their equivalents in the United States (35.9%), Denmark (31%) and Japan (12.7%).

While still trailing male literacy rates, female literacy rates in Turkey have grown substantially to 93.6% in 2016. Illiteracy is particularly prevalent among rural women, who are often not sent to school as girls. Half of girls aged between 15 and 19 are neither in the education system nor in the workforce. The government and various other foundations are engaged in education campaigns in Southeastern Anatolia to improve the rate of literacy and education levels of women. In 2008, 4 million women were illiterate, as opposed to 990 thousand men. A 2008 poll by the Women Entrepreneurs Association of Turkey showed that almost half of urban Turkish women believe economic independence for women is unnecessary reflecting, in the view of psychologist Leyla Navaro, a heritage of patriarchy.

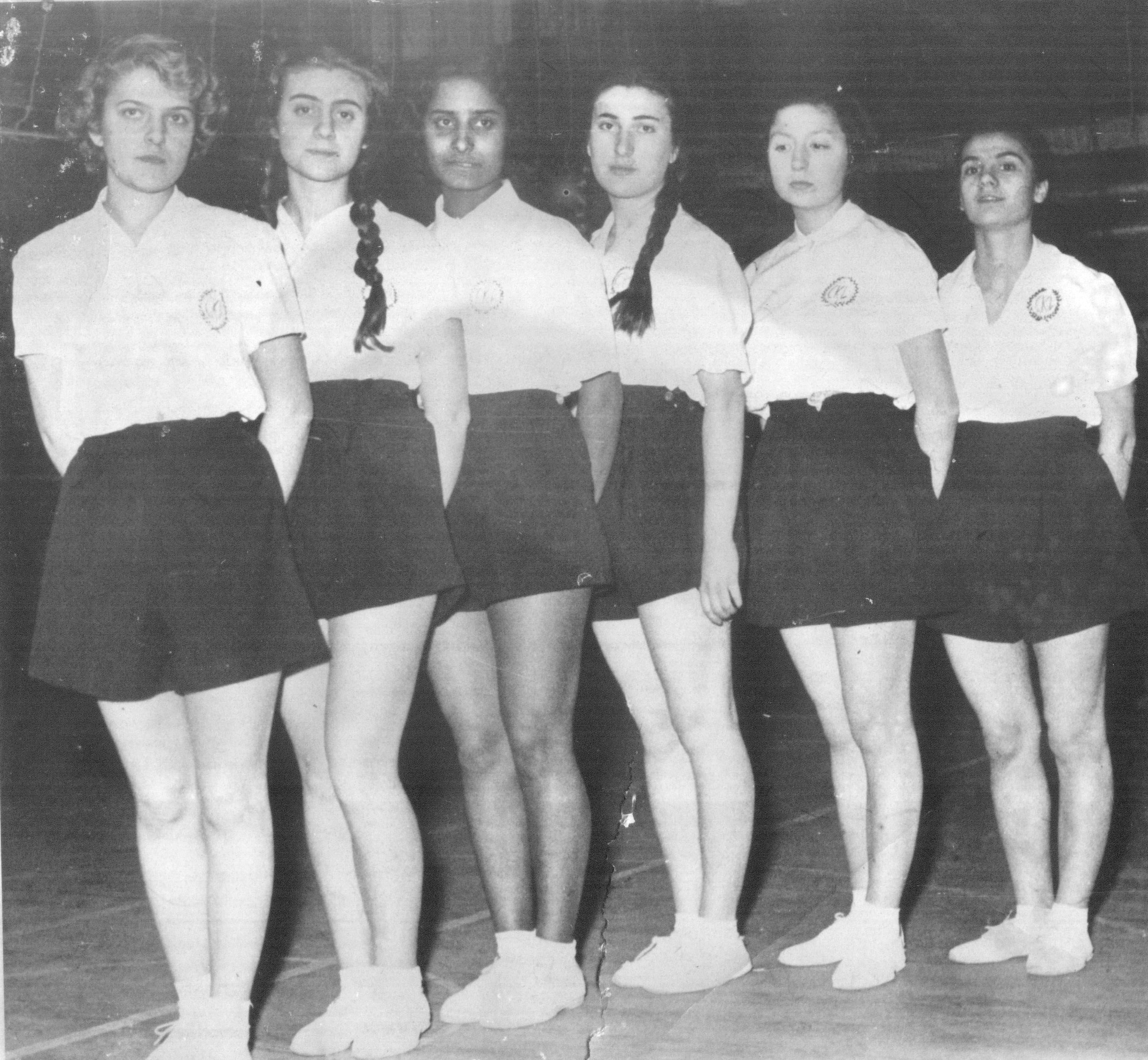
Volleyball team of Çamlıca Girls' High School in 1950s

In the 2012–2013, the schooling ratio of girls (at 99.61% as of 2014 according to the Turkish Statistical Institute) exceeded that of the boys for the first time in Turkish history. The gender gap in secondary education (5.3% lower than boys) remained, albeit at much lower levels in comparison to the 2002–2003 educational year (25.8%). However, the gender gap in higher education increased between 2002 and 2012 to 9.5%. Significant regional differences still persist, with only 15.9% of girls attending secondary school in the Muş Province as of 2010, as opposed to 82.4% in the Bilecik Province, the province with the highest percentage. In 2009, the provinces with the lowest schooling ratios for girls were Bitlis, Van and Hakkari, all in southeastern Turkey, while those with the highest ratios were Ankara, İzmir and Mersin, all in western Turkey. Dropout rates for girls at primary level are higher than boys, especially concentrating at the fifth and sixth years.

Daily Habertürk reported on 9 January 2018, that only three state universities in Turkey have women rectors, despite women making up 43.58 percent of all academics in the country. According to education specialist Alaaddin Dinçer, the absence of women among universities' boards of directors is the result of a "consciously made decision."

== Employment ==
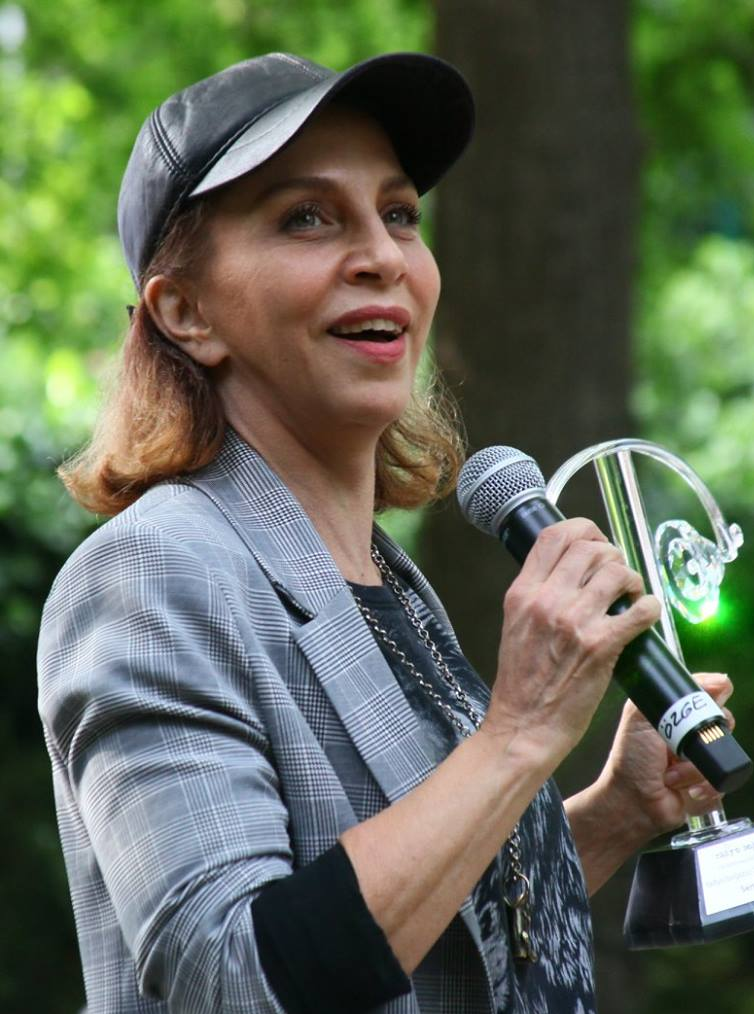
Sertab Erener is a Turkish singer and the winner of Eurovision Song Contest 2003

The employment rate (for ages 15–64), as of 2017, was 32.2% for women, much lower than that of men which was 70.7%. In 2011, out of 26 million employable women, only 5.9 million were in the labor force. 23.4% of women have either been forced by men to quit their jobs or prevented from working. The rate of women not covered by social security is 84% in the East and 87% in the Southeast.

According to World Bank, women made up 32.7% of the labor force in 2018 (roughly unchanged from 1990 when they made up 30.8%).

On the other hand, it is possible that the involvement of women in the labour force is very underestimated, due to women working in the informal economy.

Despite the relatively low involvement of women in the workforce compared to other countries, women in Turkey are quite well represented in the business world; for instance the proportion of women in business leadership roles in Turkey is almost twice higher than that of Germany.

Research on Turkish family businesses has found that women's formal participation in business ownership increased during the second half of the twentieth century. Using firm registry data from 1957 to 1994, researchers found that women became increasingly represented as shareholders and founders, particularly during the 1980s. However, formal ownership did not necessarily translate into executive authority. Inheritance practices and family structures continued to shape women's roles, while greater educational opportunities, generational change and export-oriented growth created new opportunities for younger women to participate in family firms.

On 19 October 2017, Turkish Enterprise and Business Confederation (TÜRKONFED) Chairman said that half of the women in Turkey's labor force are unregistered and that the ratio of unregistered women workers in the country is much higher than that of men. He also, said that Turkey must raise women's participation in the workforce to ensure sustainable development, adding that Turkey is the only country in Europe with an employment rate among women lower than 40 percent.

As of 2018, just 34% of women in Turkey work, by far the lowest of the 35 industrialised countries of the Organisation for Economic Co-operation and Development (OECD) where the average is 63%.

On 19 June 2018, the European Court of Human Rights has fined Turkey 11,000 euros over the government-owned electricity distribution company's refusal to appoint a woman as a security officer on account of her gender. In October 1999 the female applicant, Hülya Ebru Demirel, passed a civil service exam and was informed that she would be appointed as a security officer at the Kilis branch of the Turkish Electricity Distribution company (TEDAŞ). However, the company refused to appoint her, citing her failure to fulfil the condition for the position to be "a man who has completed military service". The applicant initially won a discrimination court case against the company in 2001 but that decision was overturned on appeal by the Supreme Administrative Court in December 2002. Demirel's subsequent appeals were all reported to be unsuccessful, which ultimately led her to lodge an appeal at the ECHR on 17 June 2008.

As of 2025, structural inequalities continue to limit Turkish women in the workplace: "Women are overrepresented in low-paid, low-security sectors such as care work, education, textiles, and retail, while underrepresented in male-dominated fields like construction, transport, engineering, and technology. Even within female-dominated sectors, women often occupy lower-level positions, while leadership roles remain largely inaccessible."

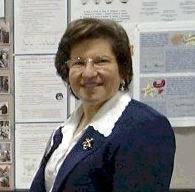
Janet Akyüz Mattei, 2009, Astronomer

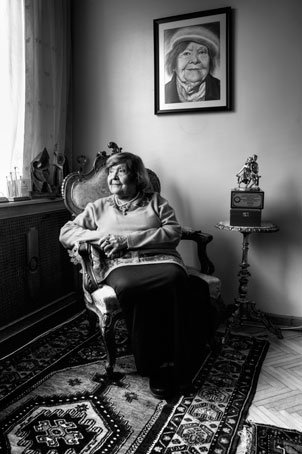
Muazzez İlmiye Çığ, 2010, Sumerologist

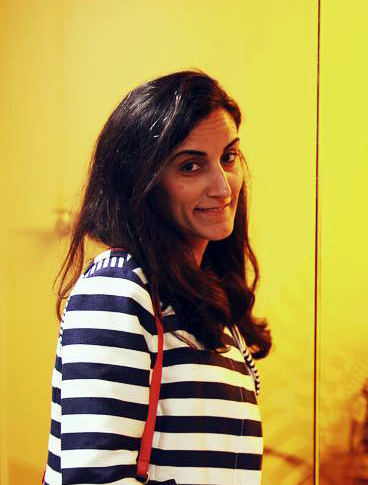
Canan Dağdeviren, Scientist

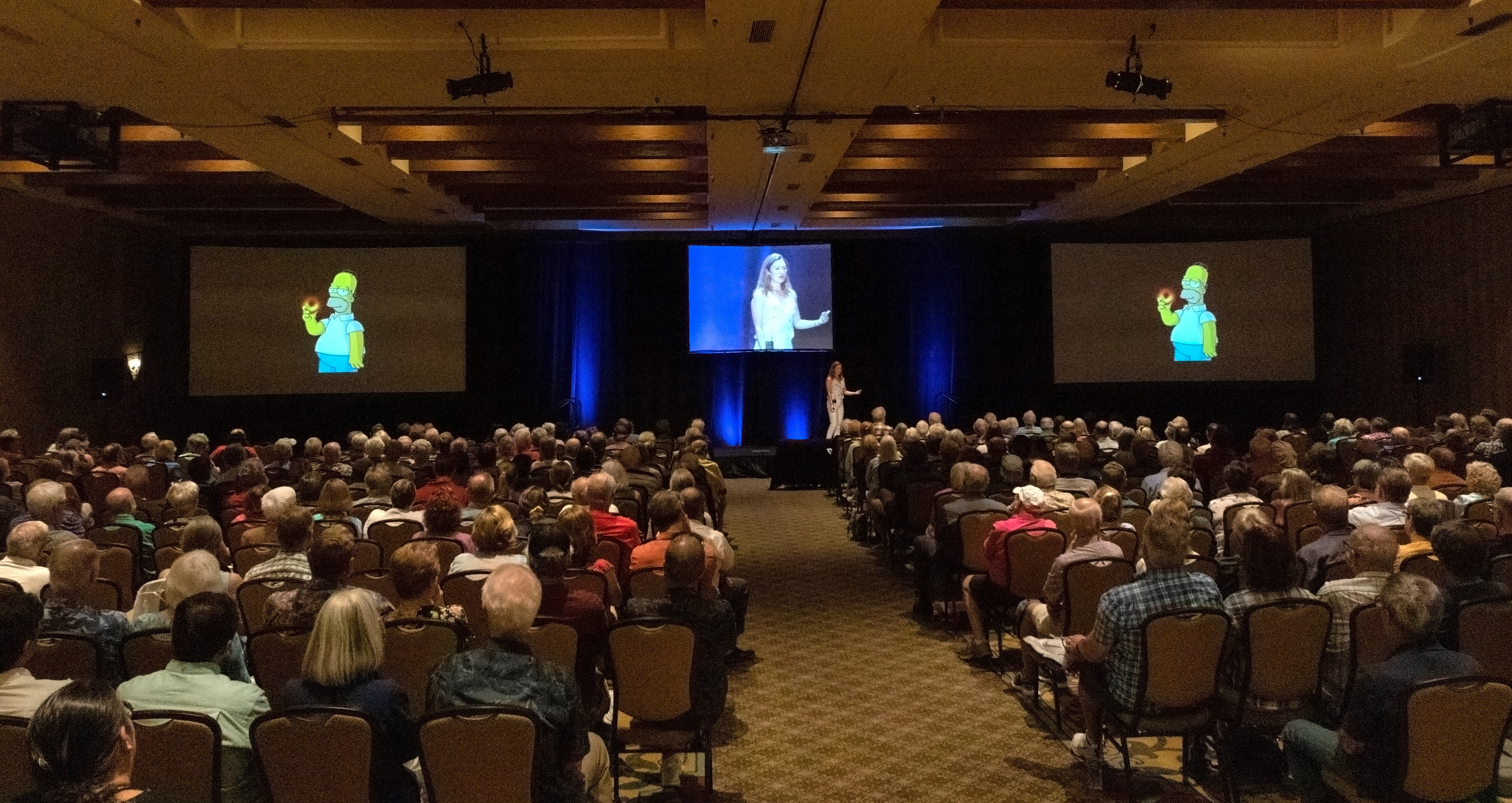
Feryal Özel, Scientist

== Censorship ==
In March 2018, Parliament Speaker İsmail Kahraman forbid the women of a troupe from being onstage, at a tribute to the anniversary of the Gallipoli Campaign at the Turkish Parliament. He was offended that actresses playing the mothers of soldiers would be giving men public hugs.

In September 2020, a female politician of Kurdish origin Sebahat Tuncel was sentenced to 11 months in prison for calling Turkish President Recep Tayyip Erdoğan an enemy of women in a speech in 2016. She had made this statement after two controversial statements of Erdogan where in 2014 he said "publicly women are not equal to men" and in 2016 he said "women who reject motherhood are deficient and incomplete".

== Family life ==
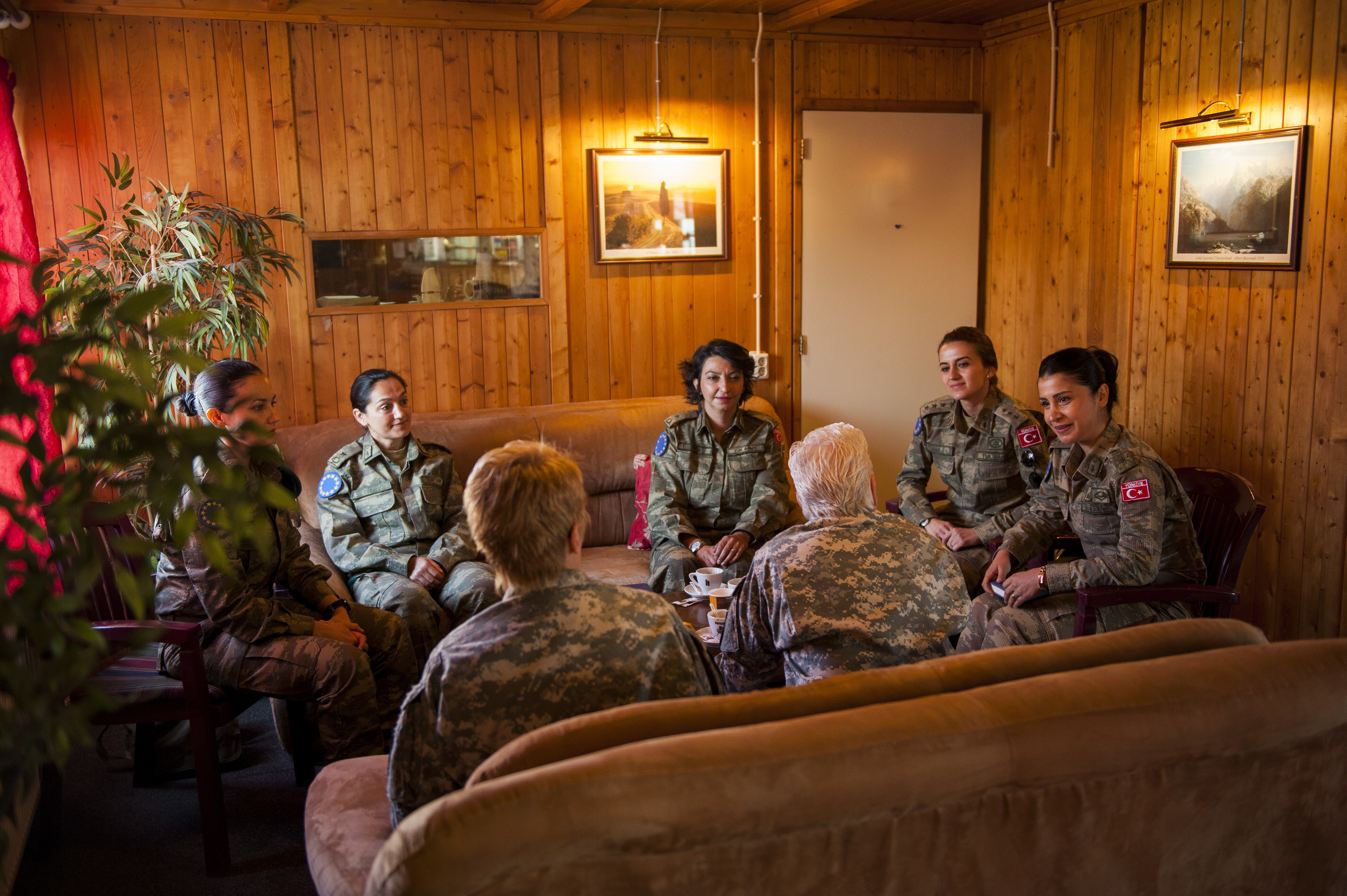
Female soldiers of Turkish Armed Forces in NATO Headquarters Sarajevo.

On average, 18% of Turkish women were married before the age of 18. Because of the large regional differences in the incidence of underage marriages, as many as 30% are married as minors, particularly in Eastern Anatolia. A report by the Commission on Equality of Opportunity for Women and Men states that childhood marriages are "widely accepted" by Turkish society. A bride price is still paid in parts of Turkey.

In 2016, the governing Islamist conservative Justice and Development Party (AKP) sought to introduce legislation which would have made a child rape no longer punishable if the perpetrator would offer to marry his victim; this was withdrawn after a public outcry against what was widely seen as an attempt of "legitimising rape and encouraging child marriage".

In February 2018, daily Habertürk reported that the number of Turkish women illegally seeking surrogate mothers abroad, especially in countries where the practice is common and legal, such as in Cyprus, Georgia and the United States, or women offering to become surrogates for money has been on the rise. This practice is forbidden by Turkish law.

=== Underage pregnancy ===
General Directorate of Population and Citizenship Affairs, mentioned that 2,730 girls younger than 15 years old and 50,848 girls aged between 15 and 17 gave birth in 2001.

Turkish Statistical Institute (TÜIK) mentioned that 16,396 girls aged between 15 and 17 gave birth across Turkey in 2016, as well as 234 girls younger than 15.

In 2017, officials in Turkey recorded the number of underage pregnancies at 15,216. Istanbul and the province of Gaziantep topped the list with 1,106.

In January 2018, media reports revealed that a single Istanbul hospital had covered up over 100 underage pregnancies in just six months.

In the first half of 2018, there were 625 underage conceptions in Istanbul and 499 in Gaziantep.

During 2017 and the first half of 2018, there were 1,348 underage pregnancies in the province of Adana, 1,005 in the province of Diyarbakır and 1,313 in the province of Hatay. During this period, in only four provinces of Turkey the number of underage pregnancies fell below 10.

== Clothing ==
Do you cover when going outside?
	1999	2012
No, I do not	47.3%	70.5%
Yes, I wear a headscarf	33.4%	18.8%
Yes, I wear a türban	15.7%	11.4%
Yes, I wear a çarşaf	3.4%	0.1%
NI/NA	0.3%	2.2%

A 2006 survey by the Turkish Economic and Social Studies Foundation estimated the prevalence of hair covering among Turkish women at 30%. There are regional variations: in 2005, 30% of women in Istanbul covered their hair, while in central and eastern Turkey, women are rarely seen on the streets, and wear headscarves in public.

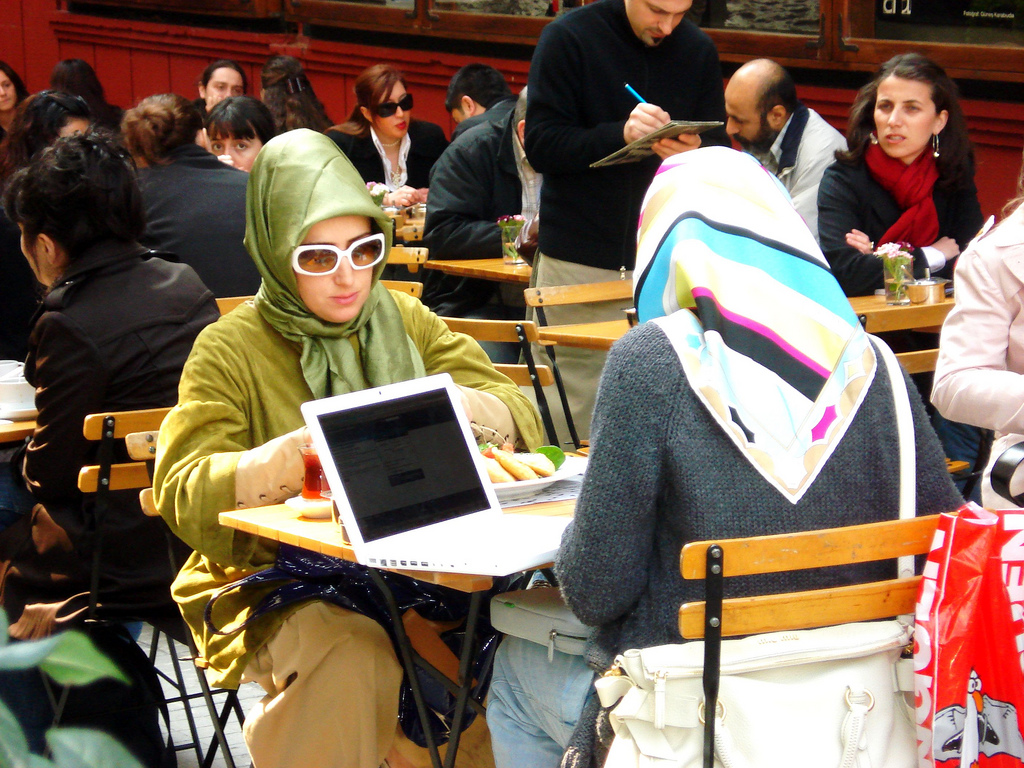
Women in headscarves at a cafe

The 2006 survey found that, compared to a previous study carried out in 1999, the number of women who employ headcoverings had increased in rural areas, but decreased in cities. It also found that the çarşaf, Turkish version of Arabic niqab, was almost never worn by women in the 18–39 age group.

From 1999 to 2006, women not wearing head coverings in the 25–39 age group rose from 28% to 41.5%, and in the 18–24 group increased from 40.5% to 50.7%. The prevalence also differs by income: in 2006, 37.2% of women in the medium income group were uncovered, compared to 71.2% in the higher income group.

The same survey asked single men whether they would want prospective wives to go covered: 56% responded no, 44% yes. Only 1.1% of covered women said they cover because of their spouses, fiancees or family.

== Women's health ==
Since 1985, Turkish women have the right to freely exercise abortions in the first 10 weeks of pregnancy and the right to contraceptive medicine paid for by the Social Security. Turkish prime minister Erdoğan argued that women should have at least three children.

With the 1994 World Population and Development Conference, the Ministry of Health adopted a policy change which included the emotional, social and physical health of women and young girls with an integrated approach, rather than only reproductive health and family planning as it did in the past. Another initiative brought onto the agenda by the Ministry of Health after the Beijing Conference, is to ensure the participation of men in reproductive health and family planning.

== Sport ==
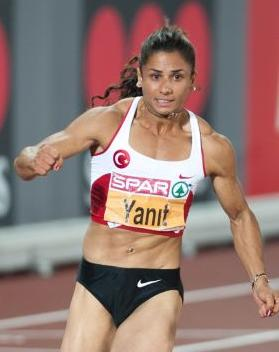
Nevin Yanıt, 2012, Turkish sprinter, winner of 2010 European Athletics Championships in 100 m.hurdles

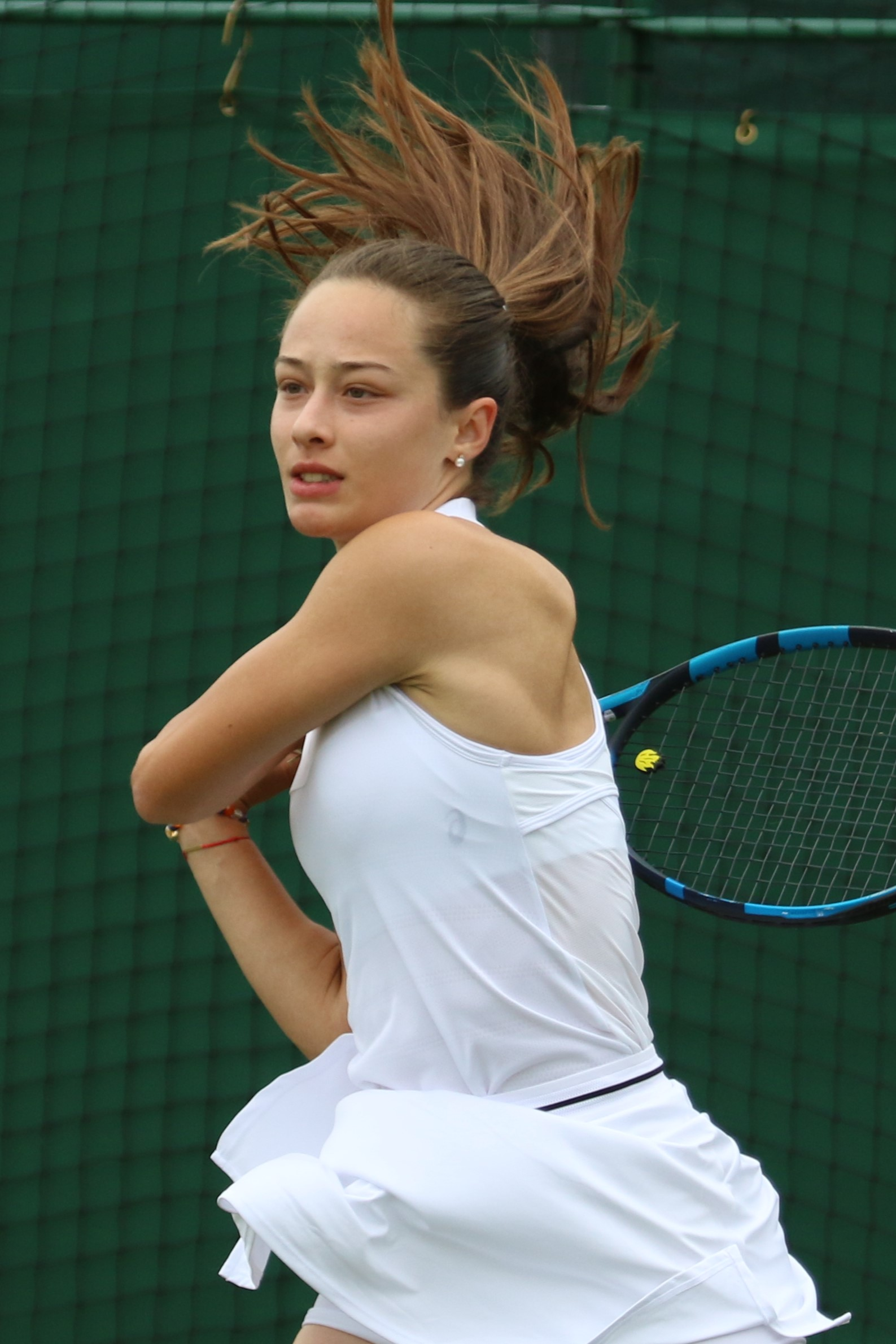
Zeynep Sönmez, WTA Tour winner

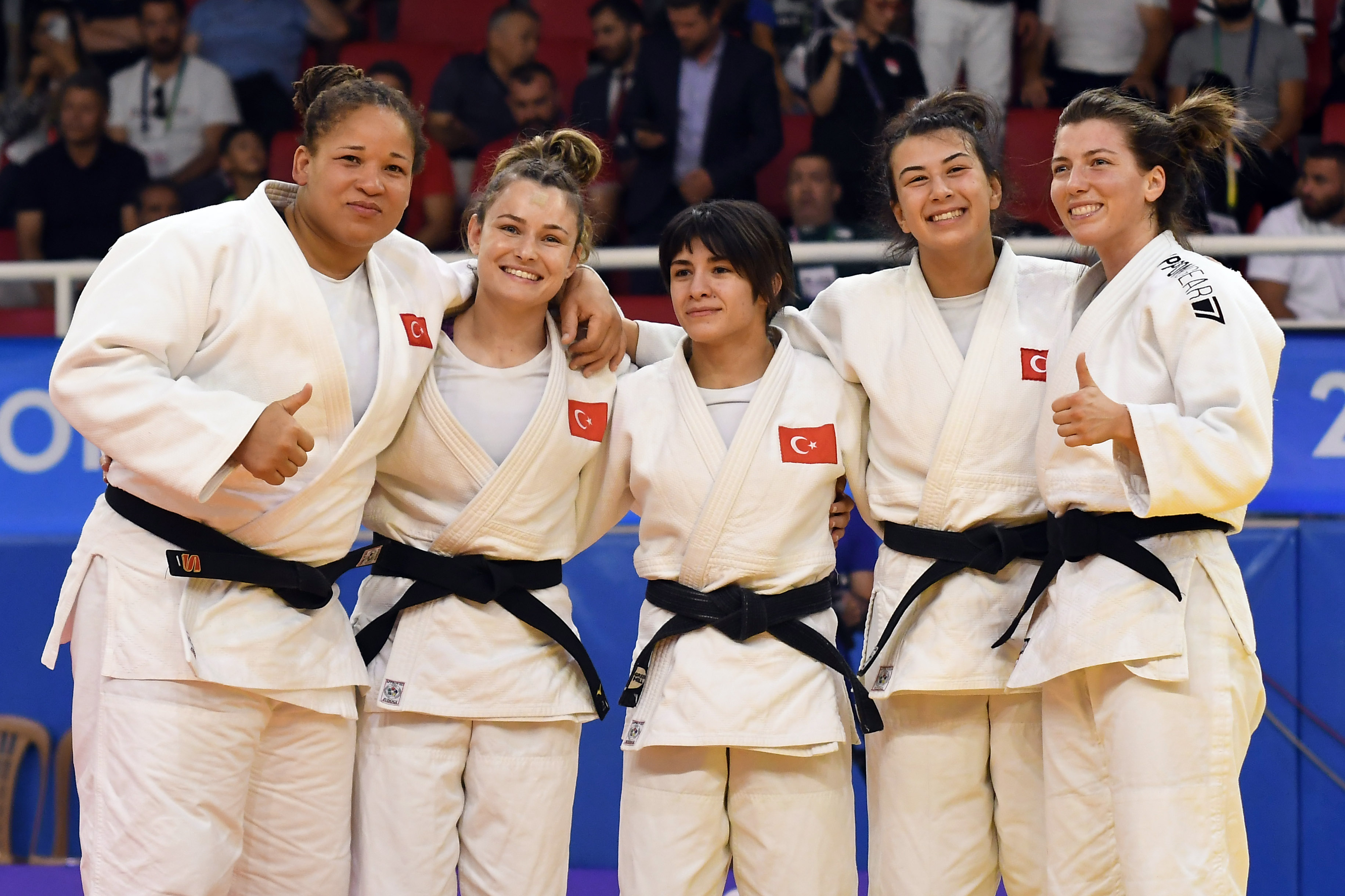
Judo women's team of Turkey, 2021

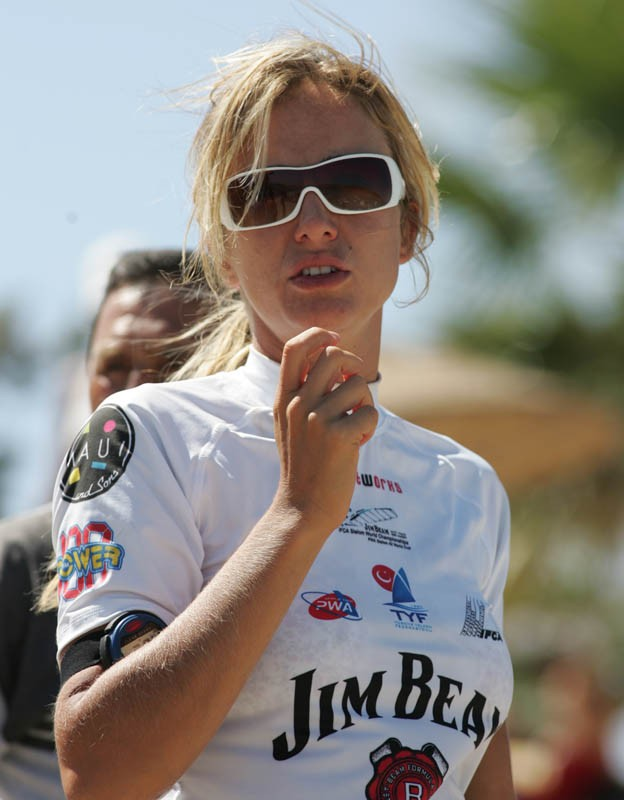
Çağla Kubat, 2006, Turkish model and windsurfer

== Bibliography on feminism in Turkey ==
=== History of feminism in Turkey ===
==== Feminism during the Ottoman Empire ====
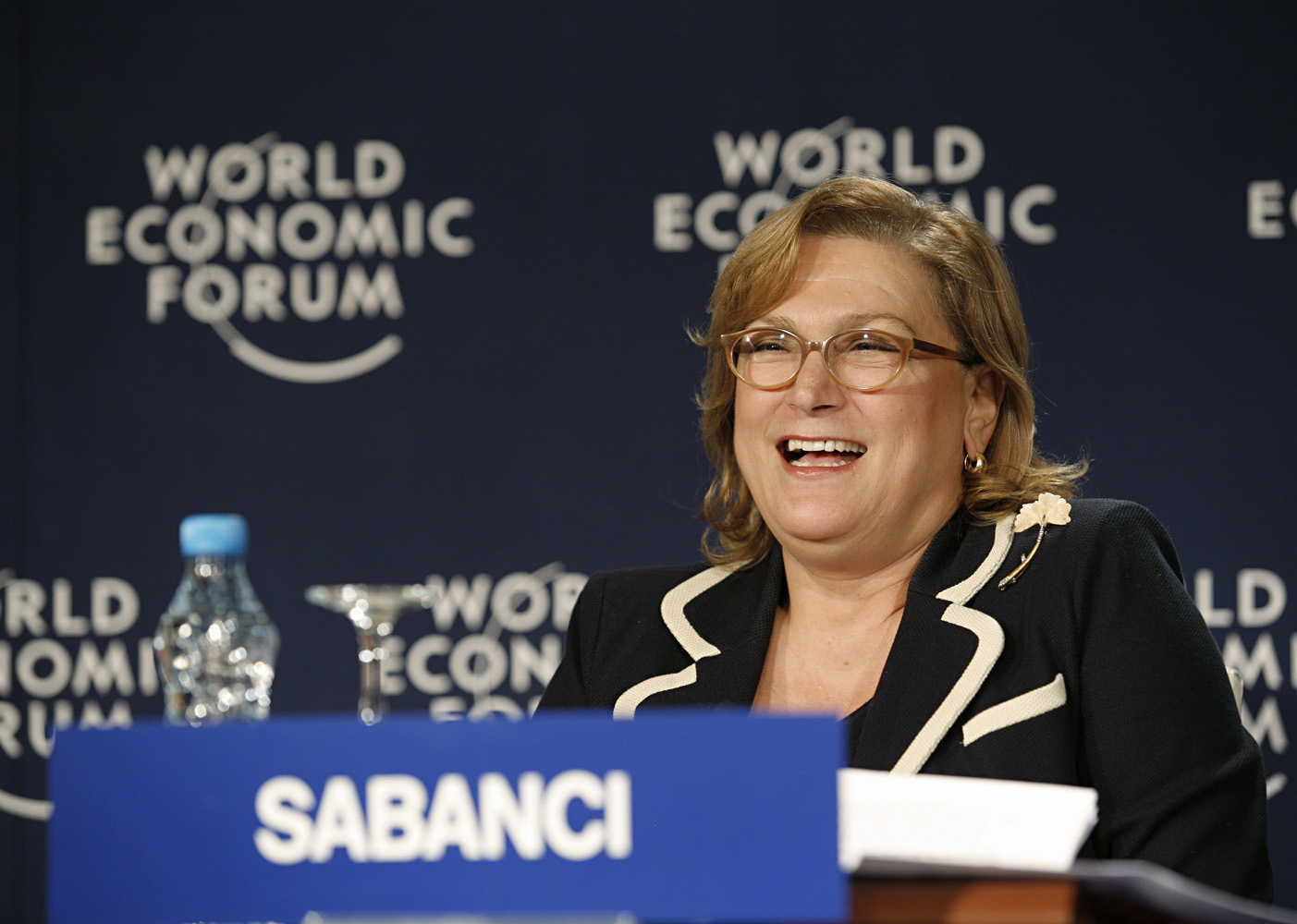
Güler Sabancı, 2008, Turkish industrialist. As of 2014, she is listed as the 60th most powerful woman in the world by Forbes

- Berktay, Fatmagul. (2000). "Osmanlı'dan Cumhuriyet'e Feminizm". Tarihin Cinsiyeti, 2006, Istanbul: Metis Yayınları. pages 88–111
- Çakıf, Serpil. (1996). Osmanlı Kadın Hareketi. Istanbul, Metis Kadin Araştırmaları Dizisi, Metis Yayınları.
- Adıvar, Halide Edib. (1913). "Yirminci Asırda Kadınlar" Mektep Müzesi Dergisi.
- Karakışla, Yavuz Selim. (1999). "Osmanlı Hanımları ve Hizmetçi Kadınlar", Toplumsal Tarih, Mart 1999, issiue 63, p. 15–24.
- Melissa Bilal ve Lerna Ekmekçioğlu, Bir Adalet Feryadı: Osmanlı'dan Türkiye'ye Beş Ermeni Feminist Yazar, "Hayganuş Mark" (İstanbul: Aras Yayınları), p. 242–263.
- Mojab, Shahrzad. (?). "Part 1: Historical Perspectives". Women of a Non-State Nation: The Kurds. Mazda Publication. s. 25–94.
- Toprak, Zafer. (1992). "II. Meşrutiyet Döneminde Devlet, Aile ve Feminizm", Sosyo-Kültürel Degişme İçinde Türk Ailesi, cilt 1, Başbakanlık Aile Araştırrma Kurumu Yayınları, Ankara, pages 237.
- Zihnioğku, Yaprak. (2003). Kadınsız İnkılap. Metis. (especially pp. 54–115, chap. 5–7.)
- Safarian Alexander. (2007). On the History of Turkish Feminism, "Iran and the Caucasus", vol.11.1, Brill, Leiden – Boston, pp. 141–152.

==== The Republic and feminism ====
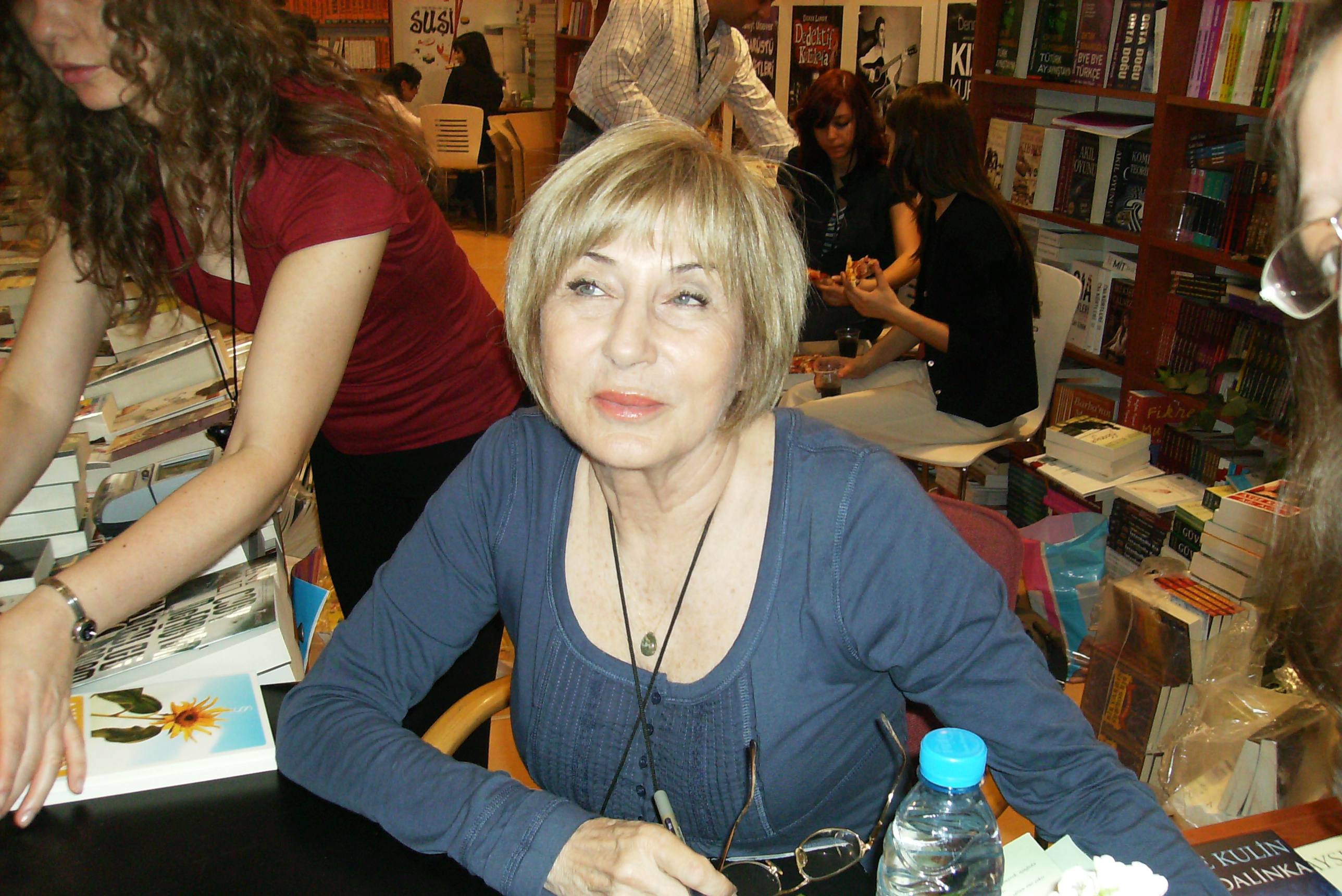
Ayşe Kulin, 2008, Turkish author

- Aksit, Elif Ekin (2005). Kizlarin Sessizligi: Kiz Enstitulerinin Uzun Tarihi. Istanbul: Iletisim Yayinlari.
- Arat, Zehra F. (1998). "Kemalizm ve Turk Kadini", (der) Ayse Berktay Hacimirzaoglu, 75 Yilda Kadin ve Erkekler. Istanbul: Turkiye Ekonomik ve Toplumsal Tarih Vakfi Yayini, 51–58.
- Arat, Zehra. Turkiye'de Kadin Olmak (der). Istanbul: Say Yayinlari.
- Arat, Zehra F. (Fall 1994). "Kemalism and Turkish women". Women and Politics. 14 (4): 57–80. doi:10.1080/1554477x.1994.9970716.
- Berktay, Fatmagul. (1993). "Turkiye Solunun Kadina Bakisi: Degisen Bir Sey Var mi?" (der) Sirin Tekeli, 1980'ler Turkiye'sinde Kadin Bakis Acisindan Kadinlar. Istanbul: Iletisim Yayinlari.
- Çağlayan, Handan (2007). Analar Yoldaslar Tanricalar: Kurt Hareketinde Kadinlar ve Kadin Kimliginin Olusumu. Istanbul: Iletisim Yayinlari. ISBN 9789750504921.
- Durakbasa, Ayse (1989). "Cumhuriyet Doneminde Kemalist Kadin Kimliginin Olusumu" Tarih ve Toplum". Tarih ve Toplum. 9 (51). Iletisim Yayinlari.
- Ergün, Emek (February 2013). "Feminist translation and feminist sociolinguistics in dialogue: A multi-layered analysis of linguistic gender constructions in and across English and Turkish". Gender and Language. 7 (1): 13–33. doi:10.1558/genl.v7i1.13.
- Edip, Halide (2000). Turk Modernlesmesi ve Feminizm. Istanbul: Iletisim Yayinlari.
- Koçak, Mine. 80'li Yıllar Kadın Hareketi Link to the original document.
- Mojab, Shahrzad (2001), "Introduction: The solitude of the stateless-Kurdish women at the margins of feminist knowledge", in Mojab, Shahrzad (ed.), Women of a non-state nation: the Kurds, Costa Mesa, California: Mazda Publishers, pp. 1–10, ISBN 9781568590936. Pdf of book contents.
- Tekeli, Sirin. (1998). "Birinci ve İkinci Dalga Feminist Hareketlerin Karşılaştırılmalı İncelemesi Üzerine bir Deneme." 75 Yılda Kadınlar ve Erkekler, İş Bankası ve Tarih Vakfı Yayınları, s. 337–346.
- Stella, Ovadia ve Gülnur Savran; Bozan & Ekin, & Ramazanoglu & Tuksal pieces in Özgürlüğü Ararken, Amargi, s. 37–57, 81–101, 203–221, s. 221–239 (roza ve jujin dergileri), 239–257.
- Nukhet, Sirman (1993). "Feminism in Turkey: A Short History". New Perspectives on Turkey. 3 (1). Contemporary Turkish Studies at the London School of Economics and Political Science: 1–34.
- Selections from Amargi no. 3, Projen Var Mı? (tarih??)

=== On women and gender ===
==== Islam, nationalism and the nation-state ====
- Acikel, Fethi. (1996). "Kutsal Mazlumlugun Psikopatolojisi", Toplum ve Bilim. (70): 153–199.
- Akin Feride. (1998). "Turban Sorunu: En Buyuk Dusman", Birikim 114.

==== Media and women ====
- Aktanber, Ayse. (1993). "Turkiye'de Medya'da Kadin: Serbest, Musait Kadin veya Iyi Es, Fedakar Anne", (der) Sirin Tekeli, 1980'ler Turkiyesinde Kadin Bakis Acisindan Kadinlar. Istanbul: Iletisim Yayinlari.
- Asuman, Süner. Hayalet Ev: Yeni Türk Sinemasında Aidiyet, Kimlik ve Bellek, "Vasfiye'nin Kız Kardeşleri" (İstanbul: Metis Yayınları), s. 291–305.

==== Women's bodies, sexuality, and violence ====
- Ayse Gul Altınay and Yesim Arat, 2007. Türkiye'de Kadına Yonelik Siddet. [Click on for the original document: http://www.kadinayoneliksiddet.org/TurkiyedeKadinaYoneliksiddet.pdf ]
- Kadioglu Ayse (1998) "Cinselligin Inkari: Buyuk Toplumsal Projelerin Nesnesi Olarak Turk Kadinlari", 75 Yilda Kadinlar ve Erkekler, Tarih Vakfi Yurt Yayinlari.
- Sümer, Sevil; Eslen-Ziya, Hande (February 2017). "New waves for old rights? Women's mobilization and bodily rights in Turkey and Norway". European Journal of Women's Studies. 24 (1): 23–38. doi:10.1177/1350506815619878. S2CID 148220666.

==== Gender-related division of labor ====
- Hattatoglu-Ozbek Dilek. (2002). "Ev Eksenli Calisma Stratejileri" (der) Aynur Ilyasoglu, Necla Akgokce, Yerli Bir Feminizme Dogru. Istanbul: Sel Yayincilik.
- Ozbay Ferhunde (1998) "Turkiye'de Aile ve Hane Yapisi: Dun, Bugun, Yarin", (der) Ayse Berktay Hacimirzaoglu, 75 Yilda Kadin ve Erkekler. Istanbul: Turkiye Ekonomik ve Toplumsal Tarih Vakfi Yayini.
- (2002) "Evlerde El Kizlari: Cariyeler, Evlatliklar, Gelinler", (yay. Haz. Ayse Durakbasa) Tarih Yaziminda Sinif ve Cinsiyet. Istanbul: Iletisim Yayinlari.
- Ozyegin Gul (2003) "Kapicilar, Gundelikciler ve Ev Sahipleri: Turk Kent Yasaminda Sorunlu Karsilasmalar", (der) Deniz Kandiyoti, Ayse Saktanber, Kultur Fragmanlari/ Turkiye'de Gundelik Hayat. Istanbul: Metis.
- (2004) Baskalarinin Kiri/Kapicilar, Gundelikciler ve Kadinlik Halleri (Cev. Sugra Oncu) Istanbul: Iletisim Yayinlari.
- Yasin, Yael Navaro. (2000). "Cumhuriyetin Ilk Yillarinda Ev Isinin Rasyonellesmesi", Toplum ve Bilim (84).
- Sirman, Nukhet. (2002). "Kadinlarin Milliyeti", Modern Turkiye'de Siyasi Dusunce (Cilt 4), Istanbul: Iletisim Yayinlari.

==== Women and property rights ====
- Toktas, Sule; O'Neil, Mary Lou (December 2013). "How do women receive inheritance? The processes of Turkish women's inclusion and exclusion from property". Asian Women. 29 (4): 25–50. doi:10.14431/aw.2013.12.29.4.25. S2CID 142938497.

==== Women and work ====
- Erdogan Necmi (2002) "Yok-Sanma: Yoksulluk, Maduniyet ve Fark Yaralari", (der) Necmi Erdogan, Yoksulluk Halleri. Istanbul: Demokrasi Kitapligi.
- Savran Gulnur (2004) Beden, Emek, Tarih: Diyalektik Bir Feminizm Icin. Istanbul: Kanat Yayincilik.
- Bora, Aksu (2005). Kadınların Sınıfı. İletişim. pp. 59–182 (the theoretical overview from pp. 21–59 is highly recommended by Ayse Parla for her gernder class in Sabanci)

==== Women and gender (overall) ====
- Agduk-Gevrek, Meltem. (2000). "Cumhuriyet'in Asil Kizlarindan 90'larin Turk Kizlarina" Vatan, Millet, Kadinlar, Iletisim.
- Alakom Rohat 1998. "Araştırmalarda Adı Fazla Geçmeyen Bir Kuruluş: Kürt Kadınları Teali Cemiyeti." Tarih Toplum 171 (March): 36–40.
- Amargi. (2009). Kadinlar Arasinda: Deneyimlerimiz hangi kapilari aciyor: II. (der).
- Amargi (Aralik 2008). Oda: Virginia Woolf'un odasindayiz: Deneyimlerimiz hangi kapilari aciyor –I.
- Arat, Zehra. (1997). Kadinlarin Gundemi. (der). Istanbul, Say Yayinlari.
- Arat, Zehra. (1996). Kadin Gerceklikleri. (der). Istanbul, Say Yayinlari.
- Bora Aksu, Asena Gunal, and Gulnur Savran (na), "Yuvarlak Masa." Birikim.
- Edip Halide (1987) Zeyno. Istanbul: Remzi Kitabevi.
- Gürbilek Nurdan. (2004). "Kadınsılaşma Endişesi: Efemine Erkekler, Hadım Oğullar, Kadın-Adamlar," In Kör Ayna, Kayıp Şark. Metis.
- Mutluer, Nil (2008) (der). Cinsiyet Halleri: Turkiye'de toplumsal cinsiyetin kesisim sinirlari. Istanbul, Varlik Yayinlari.
- Glüpker-Kesebir, Gitta (August 2016). "Women's Rights in Turkey and the European Union Accession Process: German Media Perspectives". Journal of Women, Politics & Policy. 37 (4): 514–537. doi:10.1080/1554477X.2016.1192422. S2CID 147777072.
- Demet Lüküslü (2023) Becoming a young woman through a feminist lens: young feminist women in Turkey, Journal of Gender Studies, DOI: 10.1080/09589236.2023.2172556

== See also ==
- Domestic violence in Turkey
- Secularism in Turkey
- Turkish women in politics
- Turkish women in academics
- Turkish women in literature
- Turkish women in sports
- Child marriage in Turkey
- List of Turkish women who won international beauty pageants
- Human rights in Turkey
- Women in Europe
- Women in Asia
- Women in Islam
- Women's rights
