= Fakihe Öymen =

Turkish politician

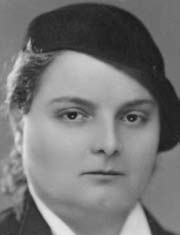

Deputy
- In office 1935–1950

Personal details
- Born: 1900 Shkodër, Ottoman Empire
- Died: 6 April 1983 (aged 82–83) Istanbul, Turkey
- Party: Republican People's Party (CHP)

Fakihe Öymen (1900 – 6 April 1983) was a Turkish school teacher, politician and one of the first 18 female members of the Turkish parliament.

She was born to İsmail and Azize in Shkodër, now a city in the Republic of Albania, then in Albania under the Ottoman Empire in 1900. She was a History and Geography teacher in Bursa Teacher's College . She also served as the director of the Girls' highschool in Bursa. Later, she served in the Turkish Historical Society.

Turkish women achieved voting rights in the local elections on 3 April 1930. Four years later, on 5 December 1934, they gained universal suffrage, earlier than most other countries. Öymen joined the Republican People's Party (CHP), and was elected in the election held on 8 February 1935 from İstanbul Province, as one of the first seventeen female politicians into the 5th Parliament of Turkey. In the 6th and the 7th Parliament of Turkey she also served as an MP. But in the 8th Parliament of Turkey, she was elected a deputy from Ankara Province. In the 1950 general election her party was defeated and her term in the parliament ended. The total duration of her term in the parliament was between 8 February 1935 to 14 May 1950.

She was married and the mother of two. She died on 6 April 1983.
