= Women's suffrage in Turkey =

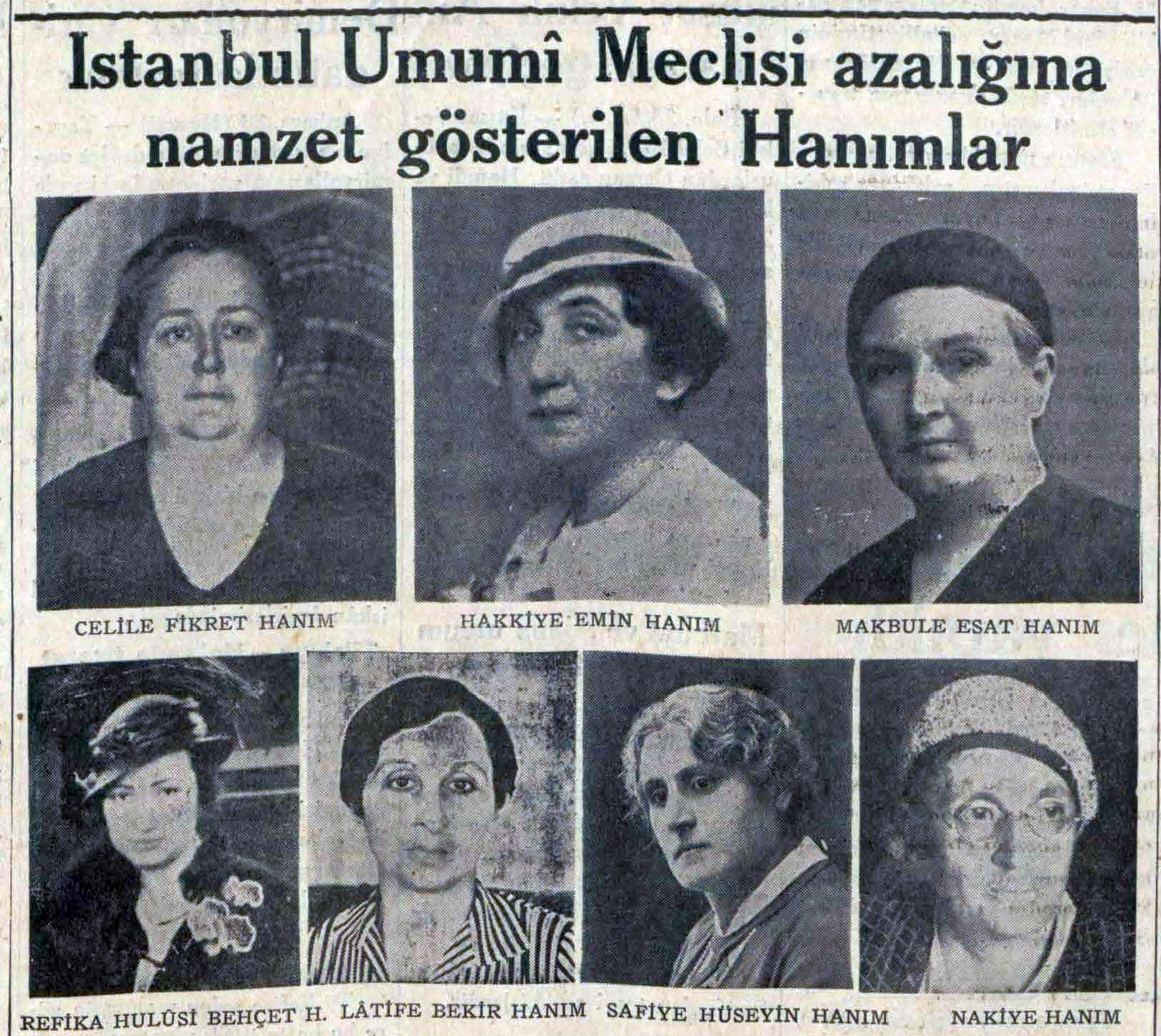
Women allocated to candidates in the Istanbul General Assembly chambers, from Vakit newspaper dated September 24, 1934.

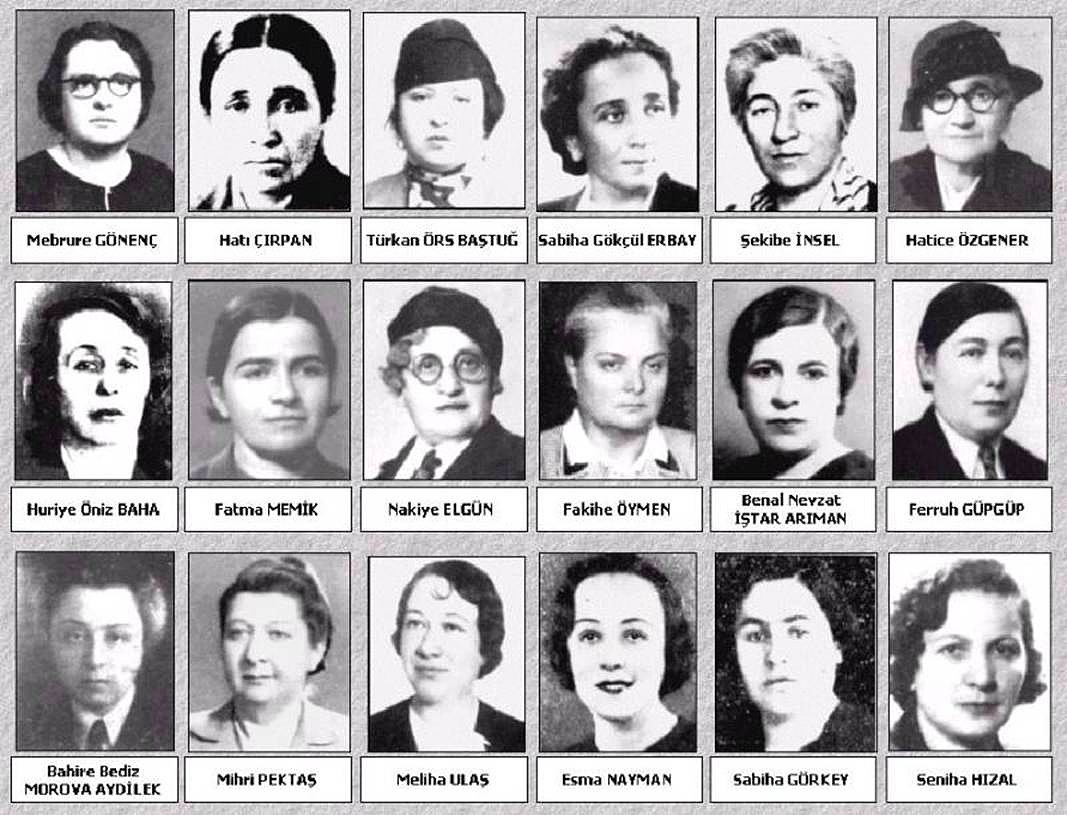
The first female MPs elected by the Grand National Assembly of Turkey in the general elections of February 8, 1935.

The recognition of women's right to choose and be elected refers to the adoption of laws necessary for women to gain political rights in Turkey in the 1930s. The achievement of women's right to choose and be elected in political life is one of the Atatürk's reforms that took place in social life.

With a series of laws enacted since 1930, women were given the right to first participate in municipal elections, then become headmen in villages, and be elected to councils of elders. Their rights to elect and be elected as MPs were recognized with the amendment made to the Constitution and Election Law on December 5, 1934.

== The right to vote and to be elected in municipal elections ==
The right of women to vote and run in municipal elections was recognized on April 3, 1930 with the adoption of the Municipal Code.

Women used their political rights for the first time in Municipal elections in 1930. The elections lasted from the beginning of September until the 20th of October. Among the women who can enter the city councils are Hasane Nalan and Benal Nevzat Hanım, the two female candidates of the Republican People's Party (CHF) in the Izmir elections and Rana Sani Yaver (Eminönü), Seniye İsmail Hanım (Beykoz), Ayşe Remzi Hanım (Beyoğlu), Nakiye Hanım (Beyoğlu), Latife Bekir Hanım(Beyoğlu) who were CHF candidates in the Istanbul elections are among the women who entered the city councils.

In these elections, Sadiye Hanım was elected as the mayor of Kılıçkaya town of Yusufeli district of Artvin province, and became "Turkey's First Female Town Mayor" and held this position for two years. Turkey's first female provincial mayor was elected after the transition to multi-party political life. Müfide İlhan, who was elected to the Mersin Municipal Council with 27 members in the local elections held on September 3, 1950, became the first female provincial mayor.

== The right to choose and be elected village headman ==
With the enactment of Law No. 2329 dated 26 October 1933 regarding the amendment of Article 20 of the Village Law; Women were given the right to be elected as village headmen and committees.

Gül Esin, who won the election with approximately 500 votes in Demirdere village (today's Karpuzlu district) in Çine district of Aydın province, became the first female headman of the Republic of Turkey.

== The right to elect and be elected a deputy ==
Women in Turkey took the first step to become deputies in 1923. This step is the desire of women to establish the first women's party “Women's People Party” under the leadership of Nezihe Muhiddin in 1923. However, due to the Election Law of 1909, this attempt to establish a party resulted in the transformation of the Women's People's Party into an association called the Turkish Women's Union.

While the 1924 constitution was being prepared, it was brought to the agenda that women should have the right to elect and be elected as members of parliament, but since the idea of granting these rights only to men prevailed in the general assembly of the Turkish Grand National Assembly, women were not able to gain political rights.

The necessary legal change took place in 1934, as a result of the proposal proposed by Prime Minister İsmet İnönü and 191 deputies to amend the Constitution and Election Law. The proposal was discussed in the Parliament on December 5, 1934. In the voting, the amendment proposal was accepted by the votes of all 258 deputies who participated in the vote in the 317-member Parliament. Articles 10 and 11 of the Constitution were amended and every woman was given the right to vote at the age of 22 and to be elected at the age of 30. Within the framework of these constitutional amendments, the rights granted in the constitution were also regulated by the election law as a result of the amendments made to the Law on Intibah-ı Mebusan (Parliamentary Election Law) on December 11, 1934.

After the law was passed, on December 7, 1934, the Turkish Women's Union organized a large celebration rally in Beyazit Square in Istanbul and a march from Beyazit to Taksim.

The first general elections in Turkey in which women participated were the 5th term elections of the Turkish Grand National Assembly, held on February 8, 1935. In these elections, 17 female deputies entered the Turkish Grand National Assembly. With the election of retired teacher Hatice Özgener as Çankırı MP in the by-elections held for vacant parliamentary seats at the beginning of 1936, the number of female deputies in the parliament increased to 18.
