= Fourth Inspectorate-General (Turkey) =

- Inspectorate-General
- Dördüncü Umumi Müffetişlik
- Country: Turkey
- Provinces: Bingöl; Tunceli; Elazığ; Erzincan
- Establishment: January 1936
- Disestablishment: 1952
- Seat: Elazığ

Government
  - Governor-Commander: Abdullah Alpdoğan

The Fourth Inspectorate-General (Dördüncü Umumi Müffetişlik) refers to a regional administrative subdivision in the Dersim region.

== Organization ==
The fourth UM spanned over the provinces of Elazığ, Erzincan, Bingöl and Tunceli. The focus of the UM was on Tunceli, but its seat was in Elazığ, which had a Turkish majority population and infrastructure of railroads and telephone lines to the Turkish capital. It was governed by a Governor-Commander in a state of emergency.

Most of the employees in the municipality were to be filled with military personnel and the Governor-Commander had the authority to evacuate whole villages and resettle them in other parts of the country.

The juridical guarantees did not comply with the law valid in other parts of Turkey. Trials were at most five days long, and sentences could not be appealed. For a release, the Governor Commander had to give his consent. The application of the death penalty was under the authority of the Governor-Commander, while normally it would be the authority of the Grand National Assembly of Turkey to approve such a punishment. The laws did not only apply only to the Dersim region, but also other regions if the authorities argued the felony had a relation to the Dersim question. In practice, people from Dersim were under surveillance at all times, even if they were exiled from Dersim to western Turkey.

== History ==
The Fourth Inspectorate-General (Umumi Müfettişlik, UM) was based on the Law 1164 from September 1927, which was passed in order to Turkefy the non-Turkish population. Before, there were established three other Inspectorates-General in other areas: the first in Kurdish provinces in the southeast of Anatolia, the second in Thracia in the northwestern part of Turkey, and another one in the northeastern part of Turkey. Following the Tunceli Law of December 1935, which demanded a more powerful government in the region, and also classified the Dersim district from the Elazığ province into a province named Tunceli, the fourth Inspectorate-General was created in January 1936.

The first Governor-Commander was Abdullah Alpdoğan, the nephew of Nurettin Pasha who suppressed the Koçgiri rebellion in 1921.

Following its establishment, military quarters, police stations, schools, and a railway track to Elazığ were built, to gain more control over the region. Seyid Riza, a local tribal chief from Dersim, demanded the Tunceli Law to be revoked and tribesmen loyal to him attacked a police station in March 1937 which sparked a strong response from the Turkish Government. The Dersim rebellion was suppressed, massacres of the local population were executed, and its leaders were hanged. Alpdoğan supported the idea, believing that the Kurdish identity would be toppled by telling the Kurds just enough that they were Turks, and stayed in the post of the Governor-Commander until 1943.

=== Disestablishment ===
In 1946 the Tunceli Law was abolished and the state of emergency removed, but the authority of the fourth UM was transferred to the military. In 1948 the administrative posts of the UM were not to be reoccupied but the legal possibility of their creation was kept. By 1950 a discussion about the UMs had begun by several members of the Grand National Assembly of Turkey. Remzi Bucak from Diyarbakır criticized the UM and compared it to British colonization practices in India. The Inspectorates-Generals were eventually dissolved in 1952 during the Government of the Democrat Party.

== Education ==
In 1937 the Elazığ Girls’ Institute was inaugurated where “savage“ Kurdish girls were supposed to become civilized Turkish young women. The institute was led for most of its existence by Sıdıka Avar.
