= History of the Republic of Turkey =

The Republic of Turkey was created after the overthrow of Sultan Mehmed VI by Mustafa Kemal Atatürk in 1922 by the new Republican Parliament in 1923. This new regime delivered the coup de grâce to the Ottoman state which had been practically wiped away from the world stage following the First World War.

== Late Ottoman Era ==
The Ottoman Empire was, since its foundation in c. 1299, ruled as an absolute monarchy. Between 1839 and 1876 the empire went through a period of reform. The Young Ottomans who were dissatisfied with these reforms worked together with Sultan Abdülhamid II to realize some form of constitutional arrangement in 1876. After a two year implementation of a constitutional monarchy, Sultan Abdülhamid II restored the absolute monarchy in 1878 by suspending the constitution and parliament.

Two decades later a new reform movement under the name of the Young Turks conspired against Sultan Abdülhamid II in what was to be called the Young Turk Revolution. This forced the sultan to reintroduce the constitutional rule in 1908, leading to a rise of active participation of the military in politics. In 1909 they effectively removed the de facto power of the sultan. By 1913, the Committee of Union and Progress became the leading faction of the Young Turks and in 1913 seized power in a coup, converting the constitutional monarchy into a dictatorship controlled by the Three Pashas. In 1914 the Ottoman Empire entered World War I on the side of the Central Powers as an ally of the German Empire and subsequently lost the war. The goal was to win territory in the East to compensate for the losses in the West in previous years during the Italo-Turkish War and the Balkan Wars. In 1918 the leaders of the Young Turks took full responsibility for the lost war and fled the country into exile leaving the country in chaos.

The Armistice of Mudros was signed, which granted the Allies, in a broad and vaguely worded clause, the right to further occupy Anatolia "in case of disorder". Within days French and British troops started occupying the remaining territory controlled by the Ottoman Empire. Mustafa Kemal Atatürk and other army officers started a resistance movement. Shortly after the Greek occupation of Western Anatolia in 1919, Mustafa Kemal Pasha set foot in Samsun to start the Turkish War of Independence against the occupation and persecution of Muslims in Anatolia. He and the other army officers alongside him dominated the polity that finally established the Republic of Turkey out of what was left of the Ottoman Empire. Turkey was established based on the ideology found in the country's pre-Ottoman history and was also steered towards a secular political system to diminish the influence of religious groups such as the Ulema.

== One-party period (1923–1945) ==
=== Atatürk era (1923–1938) ===
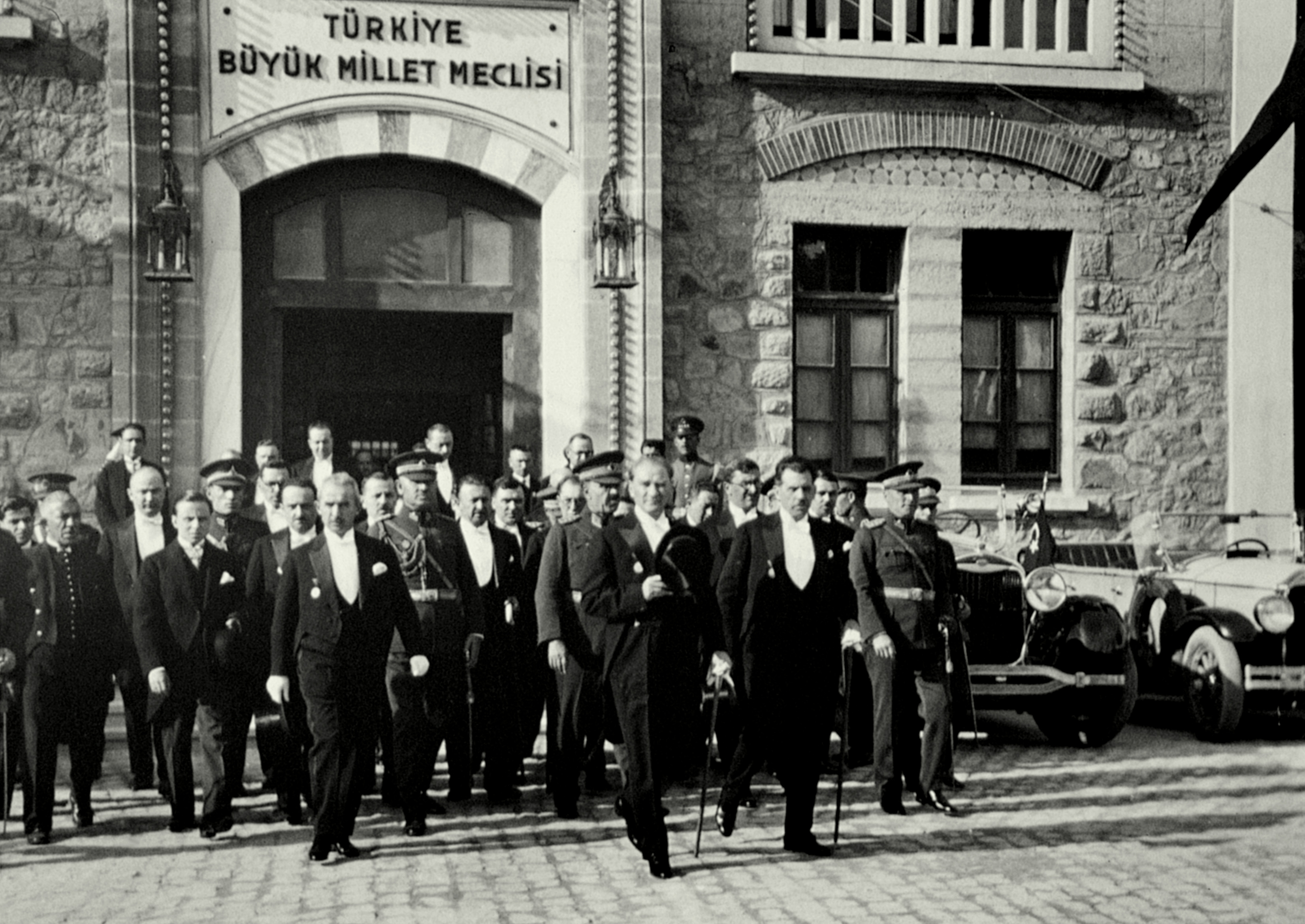
President Atatürk and his colleagues leaving the building of the Grand National Assembly of Turkey (today the Museum of the Republic) after a meeting

The history of modern Turkey begins with the foundation of the republic on 29 October 1923, with Atatürk as its first president. The government was formed from the Ankara-based revolutionary group, led by Mustafa Kemal Atatürk and his colleagues. The second constitution was ratified by the Grand National Assembly on 20 April 1924.

For about the next 10 years, the country saw a steady process of secular Westernization through Atatürk's reforms, which included the unification of education; the discontinuation of religious and other titles; the closure of Islamic courts and the replacement of Islamic canon law with a secular civil code modeled after Switzerland's and a penal code modeled after the Italian Penal Code; recognition of the equality between the sexes and the granting of full political rights to women on 5 December 1934; the language reform initiated by the newly founded Turkish Language Association; replacement of the Ottoman Turkish alphabet with the new Turkish alphabet derived from the Latin script; the dress law (the wearing of a fez, is outlawed); the law on family names; and many others.

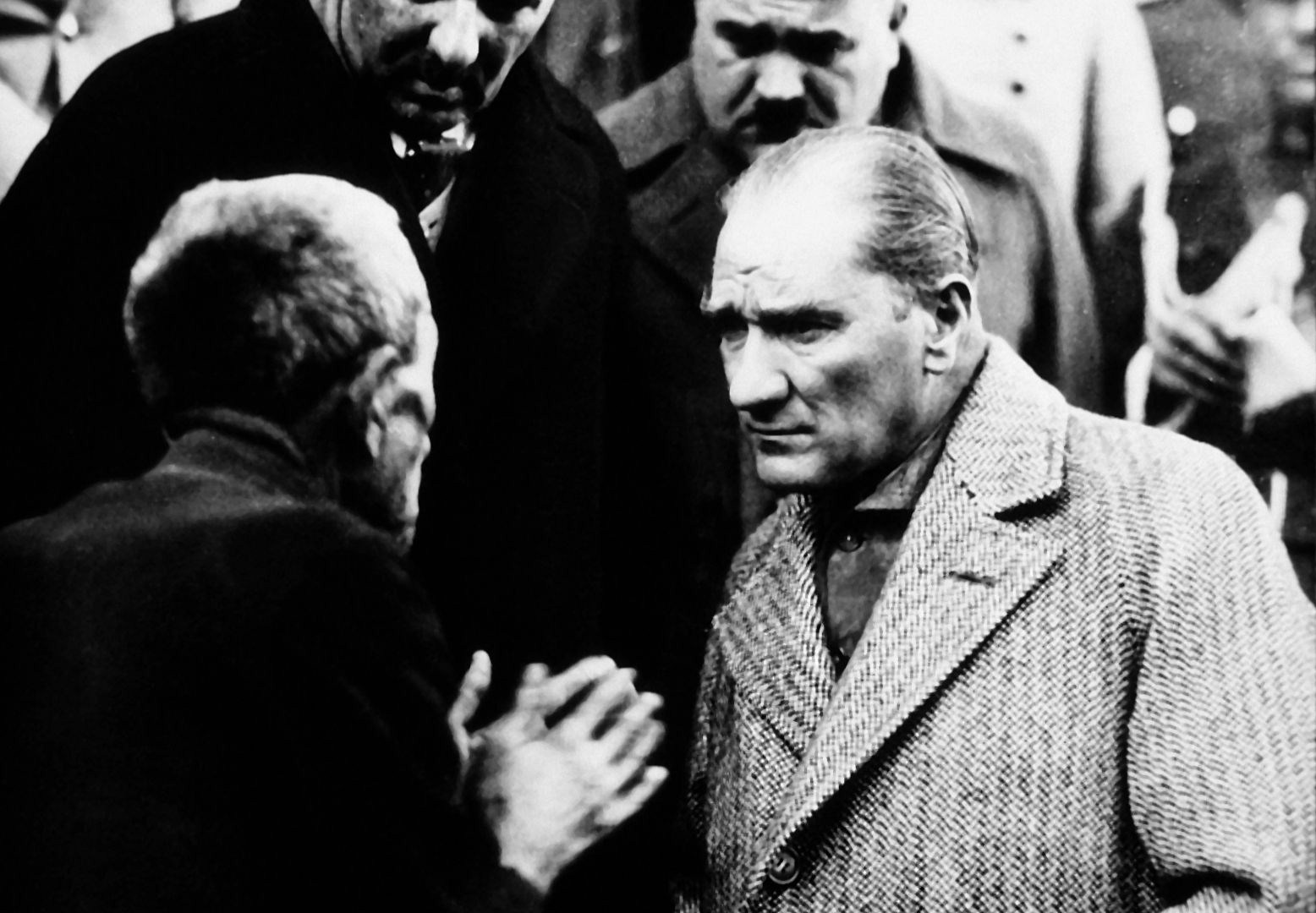
Atatürk listens to a citizen in Tokat (1930).

Chronology of Major Kemalist Reforms:

- 1 November 1922: Abolition of the office of the Ottoman Sultan.
- 29 October 1923: Proclamation of the Republic of Turkey.
- 3 March 1924: Abolition of the office of Caliphate held by the Ottoman Caliphate.
- 25 November 1925: Change of headgear and dress.
- 30 November 1925: Closure of religious convents and dervish lodges.
- 1 March 1926: Introduction of the new penal law.
- 4 October 1926: Introduction of the new civil code.
- 1 November 1928: Adoption of the new Turkish alphabet.
- 21 June 1934: Introduction of the law on family names.
- 26 November 1934: Abolition of titles and by-names.
- 5 December 1934: Full political rights, to vote and be elected, to women.
- 14 October 1935: Closure of the Masonic lodges.
- 5 February 1937: The inclusion of the principle of secularism in the constitution.

The first party to be established in the newly formed republic was the Women's Party (Kadınlar Halk Fırkası). It was founded by Nezihe Muhiddin and several other women but was stopped from its activities, since during the time women were not yet legally allowed to engage in politics. The actual passage to multi-party period was first attempted with the Liberal Republican Party by Ali Fethi Okyar. The Liberal Republican Party was dissolved on 17 November 1930 and no further attempt for a multi-party democracy was made until 1945. Turkey was admitted to the League of Nations in July 1932.

=== Development policy ===
==== Infrastructure ====
In 1927, Atatürk ordered the integration of road construction goals into development plans. Prior to this, the road network had consisted of 13,885 km of ruined surface roads, 4,450 km of stabilized roads, and 94 bridges. In 1935, a new entity was established under the government called Şose ve Köprüler Reisliği (Headship of Roads and Bridges) which would drive the development of new roads after World War II.

=== Foreign policy ===
Historically, Turkey continued the Foreign relations of the Ottoman Empire to balance regional and global powers off against one another, forming alliances that best protected the interests of the incumbent regime. The Soviet Union played a major role in supplying weapons to and financing Mustafa Kemal Atatürk's faction during the Turkish War of Independence but Turkey followed a course of relative international isolation during the period of Atatürk's Reforms in 1920s and 1930s. International conferences gave Turkey full control of the strategic straits linking the Black Sea and the Mediterranean, through the Treaty of Lausanne in 1923 and the Montreux Convention of 1936.

=== Post-Atatürk era (1938–1945) ===
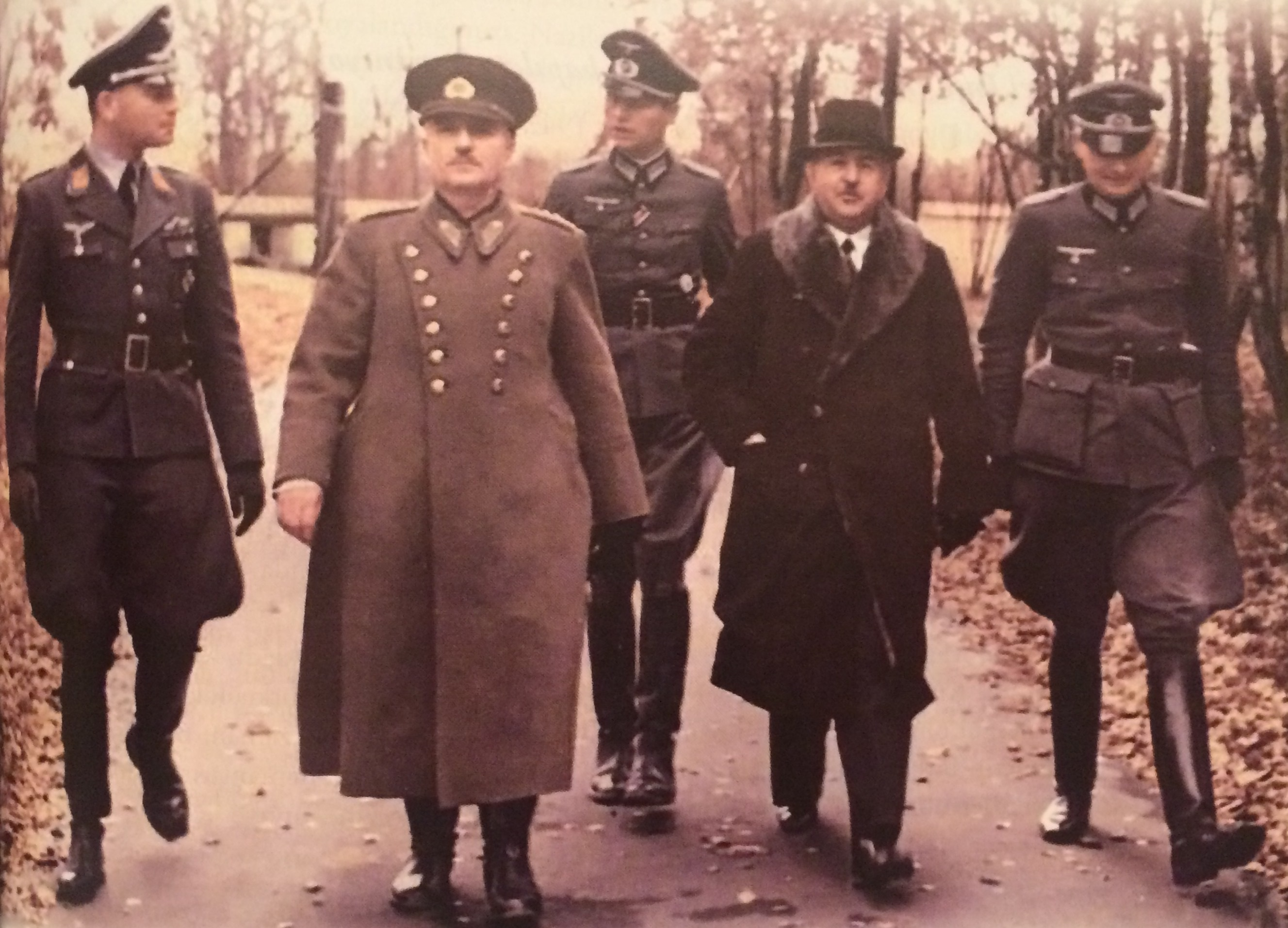
Erkilet and Erden on the Eastern Front on 31 October 1941

Atatürk's successor after his death on 10 November 1938 was İsmet İnönü. İnönü started his term in office as a respected figure of the Independence War. However, because internal fights between power groups and external events like World War II caused a lack of goods in the country, he lost some of his popularity and support.

In the late 1930s Nazi Germany made a major effort to promote anti-Soviet propaganda in Turkey and exerted economic pressure. Britain and France, eager to outmaneuver Germany, negotiated a tripartite treaty in 1939. They gave Turkey a line of credit to purchase war materials from the West and a loan to facilitate the purchase of commodities.

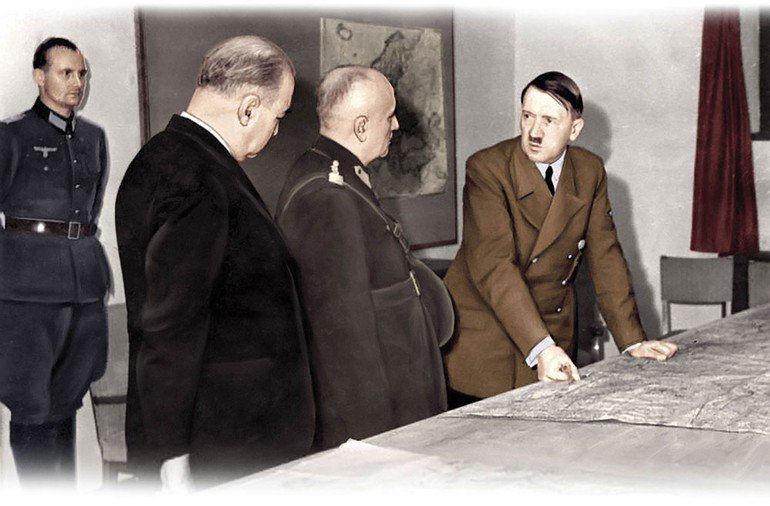
Erkilet, Erden, and Hitler in October 1941

Afraid of threats from Germany and Russia, Turkey maintained neutrality. Ambassadors from the Axis powers and Allies intermingled in Ankara. İnönü signed a non-aggression treaty with Nazi Germany on 18 June 1941, 4 days before the Axis powers invaded the Soviet Union. Nationalist magazines Bozkurt and Çınaraltı called for the declaration of war against the Soviet Union and Greece. In July 1942, Bozkurt published a map of Greater Turkey, which included Soviet controlled Caucasus and central Asian republics. In the summer of 1942, Turkish high command considered war with the Soviet Union almost unavoidable. An operation was planned, with Baku being the initial target.

Turkey traded with both sides and purchased arms from both sides. The Allies tried to stop German purchases of chrome (used in making better steel). Inflation was high as prices doubled. It was clear by 1944 that Germany would be defeated and the chrome sales to Germany stopped.

By August 1944, the Axis was clearly losing the war and Turkey broke off relations. Only in February 1945, Turkey declared war on Germany and Japan, a symbolic move that allowed Turkey to join the future United Nations.

On 24 October 1945 Turkey signed the United Nations Charter as one of the fifty-one original members.

==== Multi-party transition (1945) ====
In 1945, the first opposition party in the multi-party system in Turkey, the National Development Party, was established by industrialist Nuri Demirağ. In 1946, İnönü's government organized multi-party elections, which were won by his party. He remained as the president of the country until 1950. He is still remembered as one of the key figures of Turkey.

== Multi-party period (1945–present) ==
=== Early period (1945–1987) ===
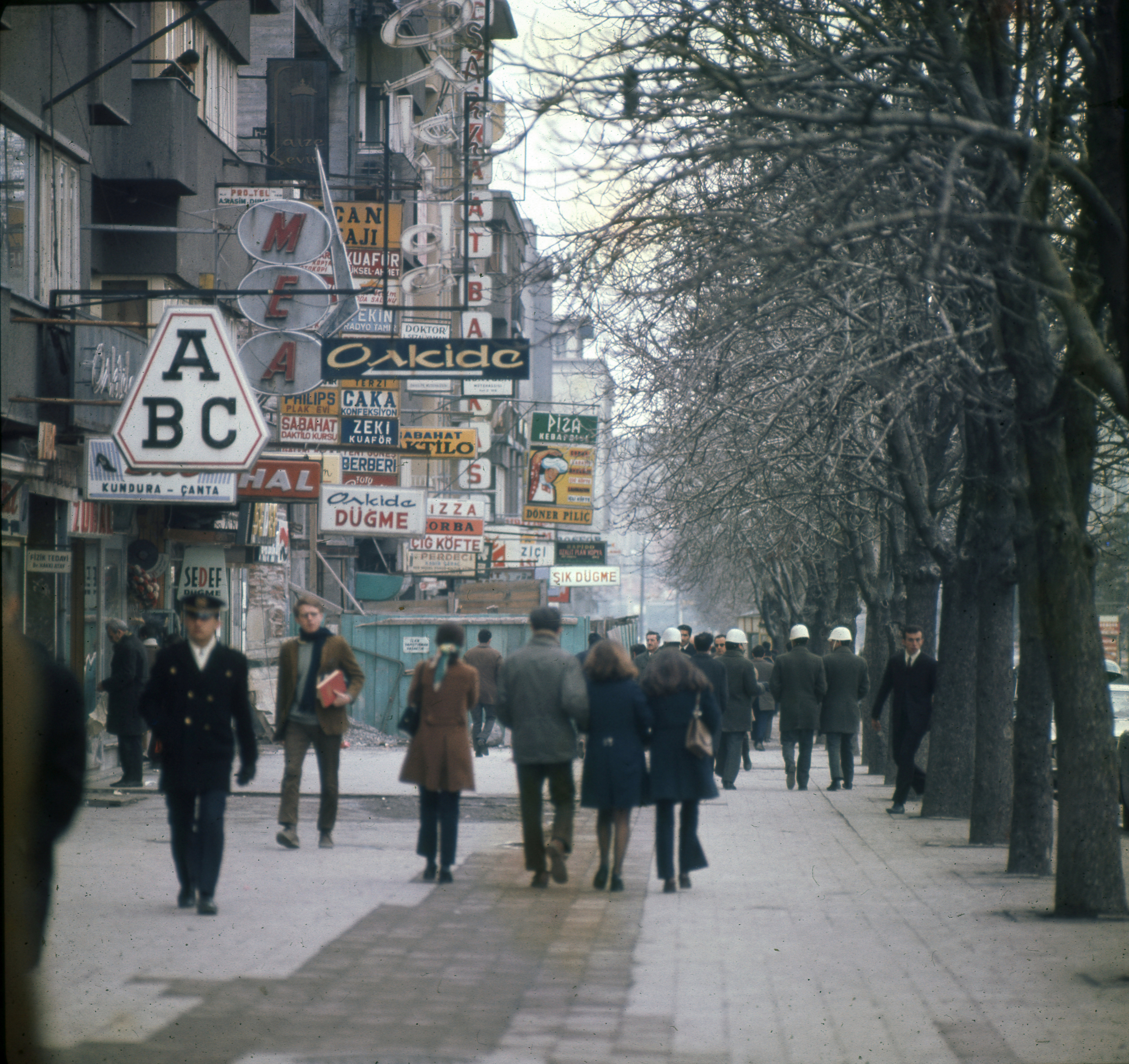
Ankara in March 1970, photographed by Victor Albert Grigas (1919–2017)

Although the multi-party period began in 1945, the election of the Democratic Party government in May 1950 marked the first victory by a non-CHP party.

The government of Adnan Menderes (1950–1960) proved very popular at first, relaxing the restrictions on Islam and presiding over a booming economy. In the latter half of the 1950s, however, the economy began to fail and the government introduced censorship laws limiting dissent. The government became plagued by high inflation and a massive debt.

==== Military coups ====
On 27 May 1960, General Cemal Gürsel led a military coup d'état, removing President Celal Bayar and Prime Minister Menderes, the second of whom was executed. The system returned to civilian control in October 1961. A fractured political system emerged in the wake of the 1960 coup, producing a series of unstable government coalitions in parliament alternating between the Justice Party of Süleyman Demirel on the right and the Republican People's Party of İsmet İnönü and Bülent Ecevit on the left.

The army issued a memorandum warning the civilian government in 1971, leading to another coup which resulted in the fall of the Demirel government and the establishment of interim governments.

Following a decade of Cypriot intercommunal violence and the coup in Cyprus in 1974 staged by the EOKA B paramilitary organisation, which overthrew President Makarios and installed the pro-Enosis (union with Greece) Sampson as dictator, Turkey invaded Cyprus on 20 July 1974 by unilaterally exercising Article IV in the Treaty of Guarantee (1960), but without restoring the status quo ante at the end of the military operation. In 1983 the Turkish Republic of Northern Cyprus, which is recognised only by Turkey, was established. The Annan Plan for reunifying the island was supported by the majority of Turkish Cypriots, but rejected by the majority of Greek Cypriots, in separate referendums in 2004. However, negotiations for solving the Cyprus dispute are still ongoing between Turkish Cypriot and Greek Cypriot political leaders.

The governments of the National Front, a series of coalitions between rightist parties, followed as Ecevit was not able to remain in office despite ranking first in the elections. The fractured political scene and poor economy led to mounting violence between ultranationalists and communists in the streets of Turkey's cities, resulting in some 5,000 deaths during the late 1970s.

A military coup d'état, headed by General Kenan Evren, took place in 1980. Martial law was extended from 20 to all then existing 67 provinces of Turkey. Within two years, the military returned the government to civilian hands, although retaining close control of the political scene. The political system came under one-party governance under the Motherland Party (ANAP) of Turgut Özal (Prime Minister from 1983 to 1989). The ANAP combined a globally oriented economic program with the promotion of conservative social values. Under Özal, the economy boomed, converting towns like Gaziantep from small provincial capitals into mid-sized economic boomtowns. Military rule began to be phased out at the end of 1983. In particular in provinces in the south-east of Turkey it was replaced by a state of emergency.

==== Conflict with Kurdish groups (1984–2025) ====
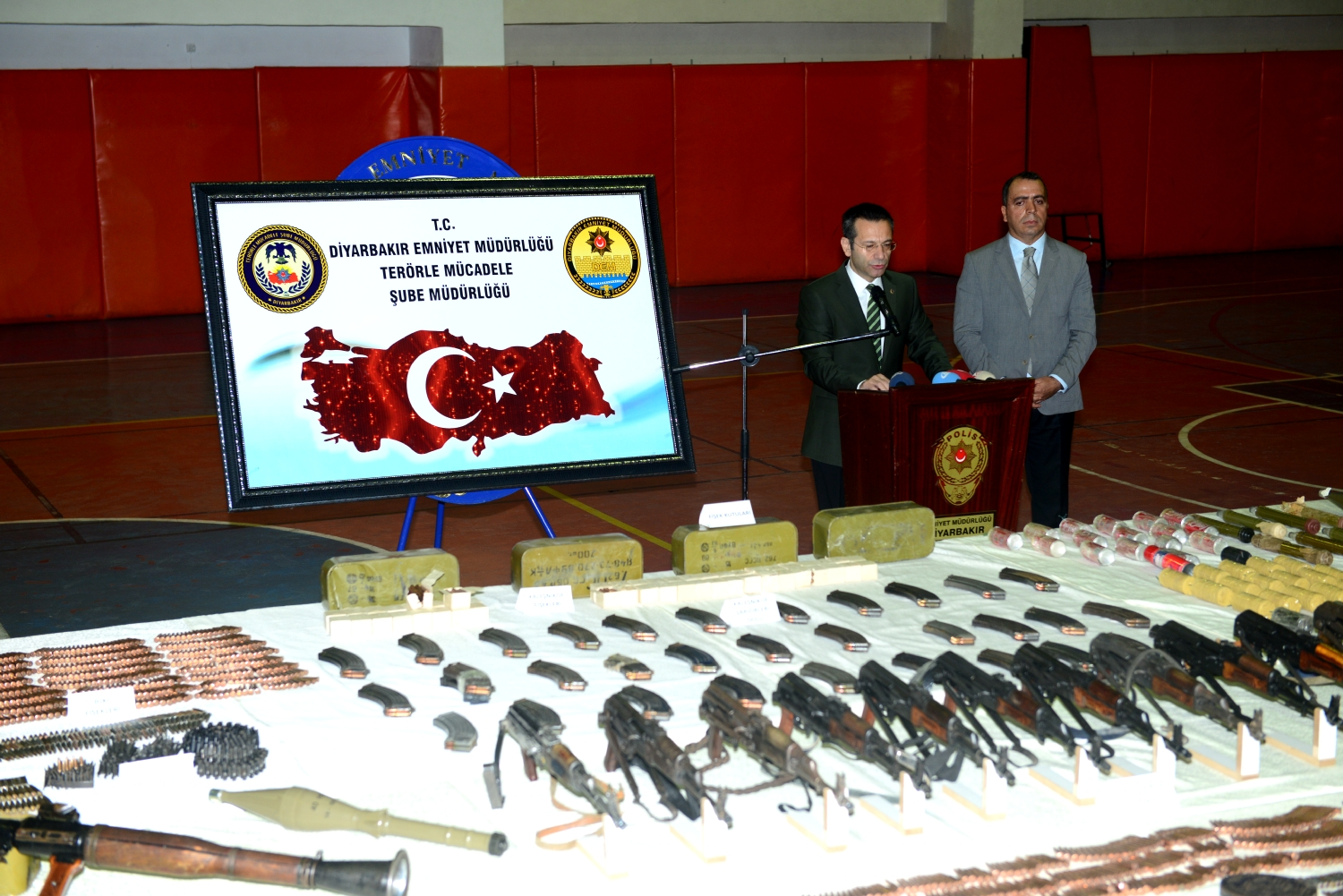
Turkish police announcing seizure of PKK ammunition in Diyarbakır, August 2015

A conflict started in 1984 between the Turkish government and various Kurdish insurgent groups, which have demanded separation from Turkey to create an independent Kurdistan, mainly Kurdistan Workers' Party (PKK) and primarily in the southeast of the country. In 1985 the government established village guards (local paramilitary militias) to oppose Kurdish groups. More than 50,000 people including civilians have died as a result of the conflict. To counter the insurgency further, in 1987 the OHAL (state of emergency) region was established in several provinces where the rebellion was active and in which a super-governor governed with extensive political power over the political and security departments. The PKK has announced a cease-fire between 1993 and 1998 and declared it would not want to separate from Turkey, but demanded peace negotiations and cultural rights. Turkey refused to deliver any at the time. The leader of PKK, Abdullah Öcalan was captured in Nairobi by the Turkish National Intelligence Agency (MIT) and taken to Turkey where he was sentenced for terrorism and treason charges in the first days of February 1999. In 2013, the Turkish government started talks with Öcalan. Following mainly secret negotiations, a largely successful ceasefire was put in place by both the Turkish state and the PKK. On 21 March 2013, Öcalan announced the "end of armed struggle" and a ceasefire with peace talks. On 25 July 2015, the conflict resumed when the Turkish Air Force bombed PKK positions in Iraq.

=== Political instability (1987–2002) ===
Starting in July 1987, the South-East was submitted to state of emergency legislation, a measure which lasted until November 2002. With the turn of the 1990s, political instability returned. The 1995 elections brought a short-lived coalition between Mesut Yılmaz's ANAP and the True Path Party, now with Tansu Çiller at the helm.

In March 1995, twenty-three people were killed and hundreds were injured in the incidents called Gazi Massacre in Istanbul. The events began with an armed attack on several coffee shops in the neighborhood, where an Alevi religious leader was killed. Protests occurred both in Gazi and Ümraniye district on the Asian side of İstanbul. Police responded with gunfire.

In 1997, the military, citing his government's support for religious policies deemed dangerous to Turkey's secular nature, sent a memorandum to Prime Minister Necmettin Erbakan requesting that he resign, which he did. The event has been famously labelled a "postmodern coup" by the Turkish admiral Salim Dervişoğlu. Shortly thereafter, the Welfare Party (RP) was banned and reborn as the Virtue Party (FP). A new government was formed by ANAP and Ecevit's Democratic Left Party (DSP) supported from the outside by the center-left Republican People's Party (CHP), led by Deniz Baykal. The DSP became the largest parliamentary party in the 1999 elections. Second place went to the far-right Nationalist Movement Party (MHP). These two parties, alongside Yılmaz's ANAP formed a government. The government was somewhat effective, if not harmonious, bringing about much-needed economic reform, instituting human rights legislation, and bringing Turkey ever closer to the European Union.

=== AKP government (2002–present) ===
MP Şafak Pavey on the Islamisation of Turkey during the AKP government

A series of economic shocks led to new elections in 2002, bringing into power the Islamist Justice and Development Party (AKP). It was headed by the former mayor of Istanbul, Recep Tayyip Erdoğan. The political reforms of the AKP have ensured the beginning of the negotiations with the European Union. The AKP again won the 2007 elections, which followed the controversial August 2007 presidential election, during which AKP member Abdullah Gül was elected president at the third round. Recent developments in Iraq (explained under positions on terrorism and security), secular and religious concerns, the intervention of the military in political issues, relations with the EU, the United States, and the Muslim world were the main issues. The outcome of this election, which brought the Turkish and Kurdish nationalist parties (MHP and DTP) into the parliament, affected Turkey's bid for the European Union membership.

AKP is the only government in Turkish political history that has managed to win three general elections in a row with an increasing number of votes received in each one. The AKP has positioned itself in the midpoint of the Turkish political scene, much thanks to the stability brought by steady economic growth since they came to power in 2002. A large part of the population have welcomed the end of the political and economic instability of the 1990s, often associated with coalition governments - see Economic history of Turkey. 2011 figures showed a 9% GDP growth for Turkey.

Alleged members of a clandestine group called Ergenekon were detained in 2008 as part of a long and complex trial. Members are accused of terrorism and of plotting to overthrow the civilian government. On 22 February 2010, more than 40 officers were arrested and formally charged with attempting to overthrow the government with respect to so-called "Sledgehammer" plot. The accused included four admirals, a general and two colonels, some of them retired, including former commanders of the Turkish navy and air force (three days later, the former commanders of the navy and air force were released).

Although the 2013 protests in Turkey started as a response against the removal of Taksim Gezi Park in Istanbul, they have sparked riots across the country in cities such as Izmir and Ankara as well. Three and a half million people are estimated to have taken an active part in almost 5,000 demonstrations across Turkey connected with the original Gezi Park protest. Twenty-two people were killed and more than 8,000 were injured, many critically.

In August 2014, Turkish Prime Minister Recep Tayyip Erdogan won Turkey's first direct presidential election.

In the Turkish parliamentary elections of 1 November 2015, the Justice and Development Party (AKP) won back the absolute majority in parliament: 317 of the 550 seats. CHP won 134 seats, HDP 59 seats, MHP 40 seats.

Since 2013, in the conflict between Islamic State of Iraq and the Levant (ISIL) and Turkish government, 304 civilians were killed by ISIL attacks across Turkey, excluding 2015 Ankara bombings allegedly perperated by ISIL in which 109 civilians died. 2015 Ankara bombings was the deadliest terror attack in modern Turkish history.

On 15 July 2016, factions within the Turkish Military attempted to overthrow President Recep Tayyip Erdoğan, citing growing non-secularism and censorship as motivation for the attempted coup. The coup was blamed on the influence of the vast network led by U.S.-based Muslim cleric Fethullah Gülen. In the aftermath of the failed coup, major purges have occurred, including that of military officials, police officers, judges, governors and civil servants. There has also been significant media purge in the aftermath of the failed coup. There has been allegations of torture in connection with these purges.

In December 2016, an off duty police officer, Mevlut Altintas, shot dead a Russian Ambassador inside an Art Gallery. He refused to surrender and was then shot and killed by special police.

On 16 April 2017, the Turkey constitutional referendum was voted in, although narrowly and divided. The referendum creates a Presidential Republic. Many observers and European states view the referendum as an "enabling act" and see it as "democratically backsliding".

On 24 June 2018, Recep Tayyip Erdogan won the presidential election in Turkey again. He was Turkey's first directly elected president. Erdogan's party AKP won a majority in the parliament with its ally MHP (Nationalist Movement Party) in the election. The opposition Republican People's Party (CHP) considered the election unfair.

In October 2018, Prince Mohammed bin Salman of Saudi Arabia sent a group of government agents to Turkey in order to murder a prominent critic, Jamal Khashoggi, in the Saudi Arabian consulate in Istanbul. His death happened just a few days before his sixtieth birthday.

Between 9 October and 25 November 2019, Turkey conducted a military offensive into north-eastern Syria.

An ongoing worldwide pandemic of coronavirus disease 2019 (COVID-19), a novel infectious disease caused by severe acute respiratory syndrome coronavirus 2 (SARS-CoV-2), was first confirmed to have spread to Turkey in March 2020. In December, COVID-19 cases in Turkey surpassed 1 million due to adding asymptomatic and mildly symptomatic cases that were previously not included in their official statistics.

In July 2022, the Turkish government asked the international community to recognise Turkey by its Turkish name Türkiye, preventing from confusion with Turkey (bird).

On 6 February 2023, 2023 Turkey–Syria earthquakes took place, which resulted in massive casualties and destruction of multiple cities.

In May 2023, President Erdogan won a new re-election and his AK Party with its allies held parliamentary majority in the general election.

As of May 2023, approximately 96,000 Ukrainian refugees of the Russian invasion of Ukraine have sought refuge in Turkey. In 2022, nearly 100,000 Russian citizens migrated to Turkey, becoming the first in the list of foreigners who moved to Turkey, meaning an increase of more than 218% from 2021.

As of August 2023, the number of refugees of the Syrian civil war in Turkey was estimated to be 3,307,882 people. The number of Syrians had decreased by 205,894 people since the beginning of the year.

In March 2024, the opposition Republican People's Party (CHP) gained a significicant victory in local election, including mayoral victories in Turkey's five largest cities: Istanbul, Ankara, Izmir, Bursa, and Antalya.

The 2025 Turkish protests began throughout Turkey on 19 March 2025 following the detention and arrest of Istanbul mayor and the opposition's president candidate Ekrem İmamoğlu and more than 100 other opposition members and protesters.

In May 2026, Ankara appeals court issued an interim measure removing the leadership of Turkey's main opposition party, the Republican People’s Party (CHP), including its chair Özgür Özel, and reinstating former leader Kemal Kılıçdaroğlu. HRW described the ruling as "the latest deeply damaging blow to the rule of law, democracy, and human rights" in Turkey.

== See also ==
- History of Turkey
- History of Ankara
- Government of the Grand National Assembly (1920–1923)
- History of Greece
- History of Bulgaria
- North Cyprus
