= Kurdia =

Kurdia can refer to:

- Kurdia, the region of Kurdistan
- Turkish Kurdistan, the Kurdish region in Turkey also known as North Kurdistan.
- Kurdia (katydid), a genus of bush crickets or katydids
