= Kâzım Dirik =

Turkish general (1881–1941)

Mehmet Kâzım Dirik 1315-P. 87
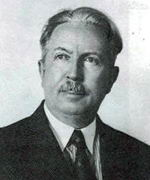
- Born: 1881; Bitola, Manastir Vilayet, Ottoman Empire (modern North Macedonia)
- Died: 3 July 1941 (aged 59–60); Edirne, Turkey
- Burial place: State Cemetery
- Military career
- Allegiance: Ottoman Empire; Turkey
- Service years: Ottoman: 1900–1919; Turkey: 1919–1928
- Rank: Korgeneral
- Commands: Inspector of the Rear Area of the Second Army, Inspector of the Rear Area of the Fourth Army, 43rd Division, 7th Division, 56th Division, 49th Division, Inspector of the Rear Area in Batumi; Chief of the General Staff of the Ninth Army, Erzurum Fortified Area Command, XV Corps (deputy), Representative of TBMM government to Georgia, Inspector of the Rear Area of Western Anatolia, General Directorate of Shipping and Transportation, 2nd Division
- Conflicts: Italo-Turkish War; Balkan Wars; First World War; Turkish War of Independence
- Other work: Deputy Governor of the Bitlis Province, Governor of the Bitlis Province, Governor of the İzmir Province, General Inspector of the Trakya Inspectorate-General

Kâzım Dirik (1881 in Bitola, Manastir Vilayet, Ottoman Empire – July 3, 1941 in Edirne) was an officer of the Ottoman Army and a general of the Turkish Army. During his political career he was Governor of İzmir between 1926 and 1935. In cooperation with the Peoples Houses, he encouraged the campaign which demanded from the population to only speak Turkish in 1934. After 1935, he also became the Inspector General of the Second Inspectorate-General in the Turkish western provinces and was involved in the Turkification and resettlement program of the Turkish Government. He presented the idea of the "Ideal Republican Village" (Turkish: İdeal Cumhuriyet Köyü).

== See also ==
- List of high-ranking commanders of the Turkish War of Independence
