= Latife Bekir =

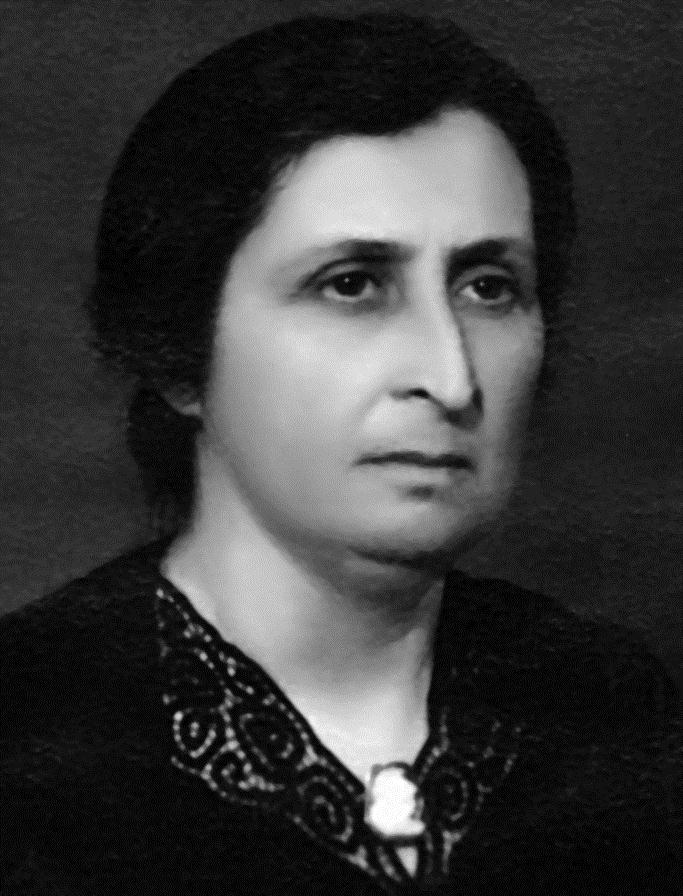
Portrait of Latife Bekir Çeyrekbaşı

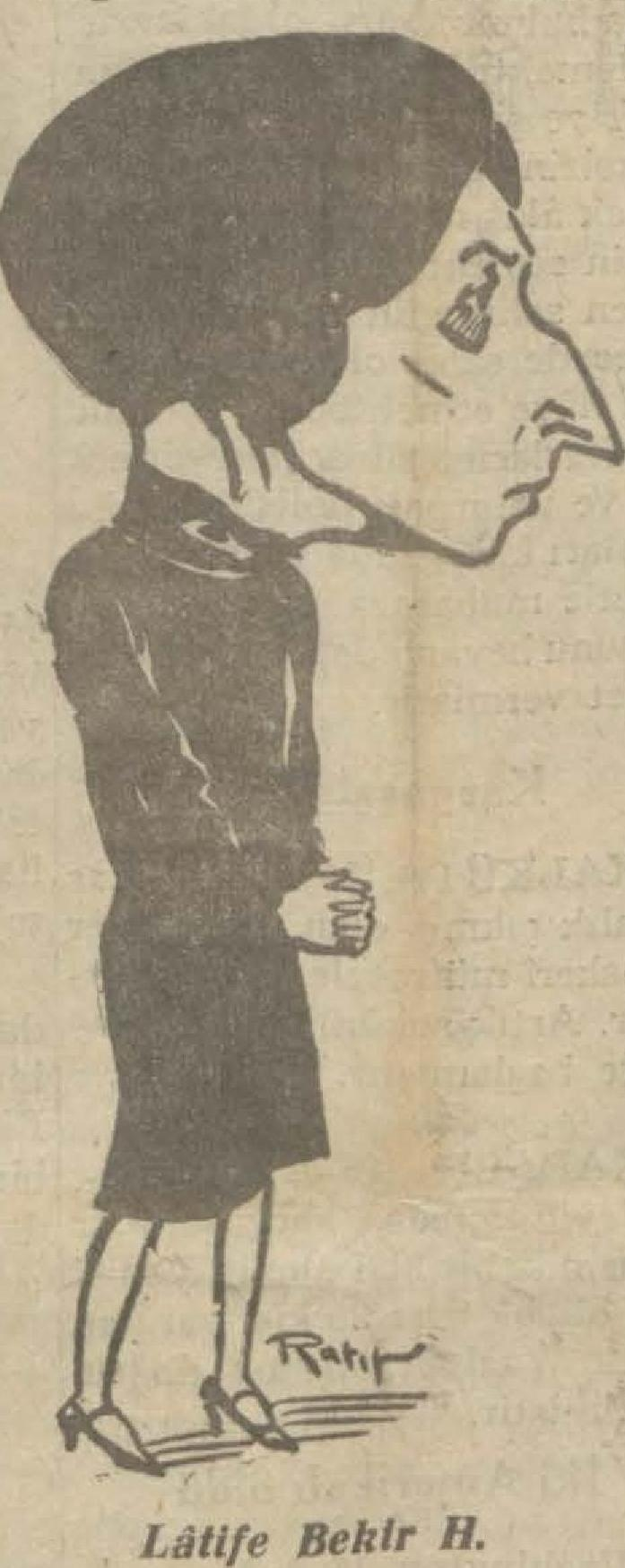
Caricature of Latife Bekir (page 1 crop)

Latife Bekir Çeyrekbaşı (1901-1952) (or with the surname given to her by Atatürk, Latife Işıkdoğdu) was a Turkish educator, politician, suffragist and women's rights activist.

Latife Bekir, one of the leading figures of the feminist movement in Turkey in the first half of the 20th century, was a member of the founding and management team of Women's People Party, founded in 1923, and its successor Türk Kadınlar Birliği. She entered the Grand National Assembly of Turkey as an İzmir deputy from the Republican People's Party in the 1946 general elections. Her grandfather was one of the Ottoman Ministers of Public Education Abdullatif Suphi Pasha, and her uncle Hamdullah Suphi Tanrıöver was one of the Ministers of National Education during the republic period. Her granddaughter Sema Çeyrekbaşıoğlu is an actress.

== First years and education ==
Latife Bekir was born in 1901 in Istanbul, the capital of the Ottoman Empire. Her father, a member of the Kocamemi family, Manager of the Forest and Mines, Yusuf Kamil Bey was son of one of the old Ministers of Public Education, Abdullah Suphi Pasha (1818-1886). Her mother is Nesime Hanım who was actively involved in Women's Associations in Thessaloniki and Istanbul during the Second Constitutional Era.

Latife was raised at home taking classical Ottoman-Turkish literature but also Arabic and Persian literature and science and language courses. She learned French from her nanny and then learned Greek.

== Career ==
Latife Hanım worked as a French teacher at Konya Girls Teacher School for two years. Afterward, she taught Turkish in French and Greek schools, including the Collége Sainte-Jeanne D'Are French Secondary School for ten years.

Latife Hanım became interested in women's rights and social issues since her youth. When she was only 17 years old she became a secretary in the Osmanlı Müdafaa-i Hukuk-ı Nisvan Cemiyeti, which was founded by her mother Nesime Hanım with the help of Committee of Union and Progress. In 1924 she was a co-founder of the Türk Kadınlar Birliği. She succeeded Nezihe Muhiddin as the President of the Türk Kadınlar Birliği in 1927, and served until 1935.

As women's rights activist, Latife Bekir was a supporter of the secular reforms of Kemal Atatürk, such as the family law reform, the women's suffrage reform and the unveiling of women.

As the President of the Türk Kadınlar Birliği she hosted the 12th Conference of the International Woman Suffrage Alliance in Istanbul in 1935, during which she held a speech in French. She was subsequently appointed Vice President of the International Woman Suffrage Alliance Conference in Amsterdam. After the introduction of women's suffrage in Turkey, she dissolved the women's organization since she considered the goal of the women's movement to be complete with the secular reforms in women's rights by Kemal.

In addition to her activities on women's rights, she pioneered the establishment of many aid societies for the poor, children, disadvantaged groups and the disabled people. She was the first woman to be elected to a city council in Turkey. She was also an MP for İzmir in 1946-1950.

== Private life and death ==
Latife Bekir married the deputy director of the Post and Telegraph Department Bekir Vefa Bey (Çeyrekbaşı) in İzmir and they had three sons. After the Surname Law was adopted in The Turkish Grand National Assembly in 1934, Mustafa Kemal Atatürk gave her the surname "Işıkdoğdu", saying that "She was born like light on Turkish women".

Latife Hanım preferred to use her husband's surname "Çeyrekbaşı" due to her husband's political resentment and Article 4 of the Surname Law, which states that "the surname can be determined by men who are the head of the family." She died at the age of 51 due to cancer on September 23, 1952.
