= Turkish Kurdistan =

Kurdish inhabited area of Turkey

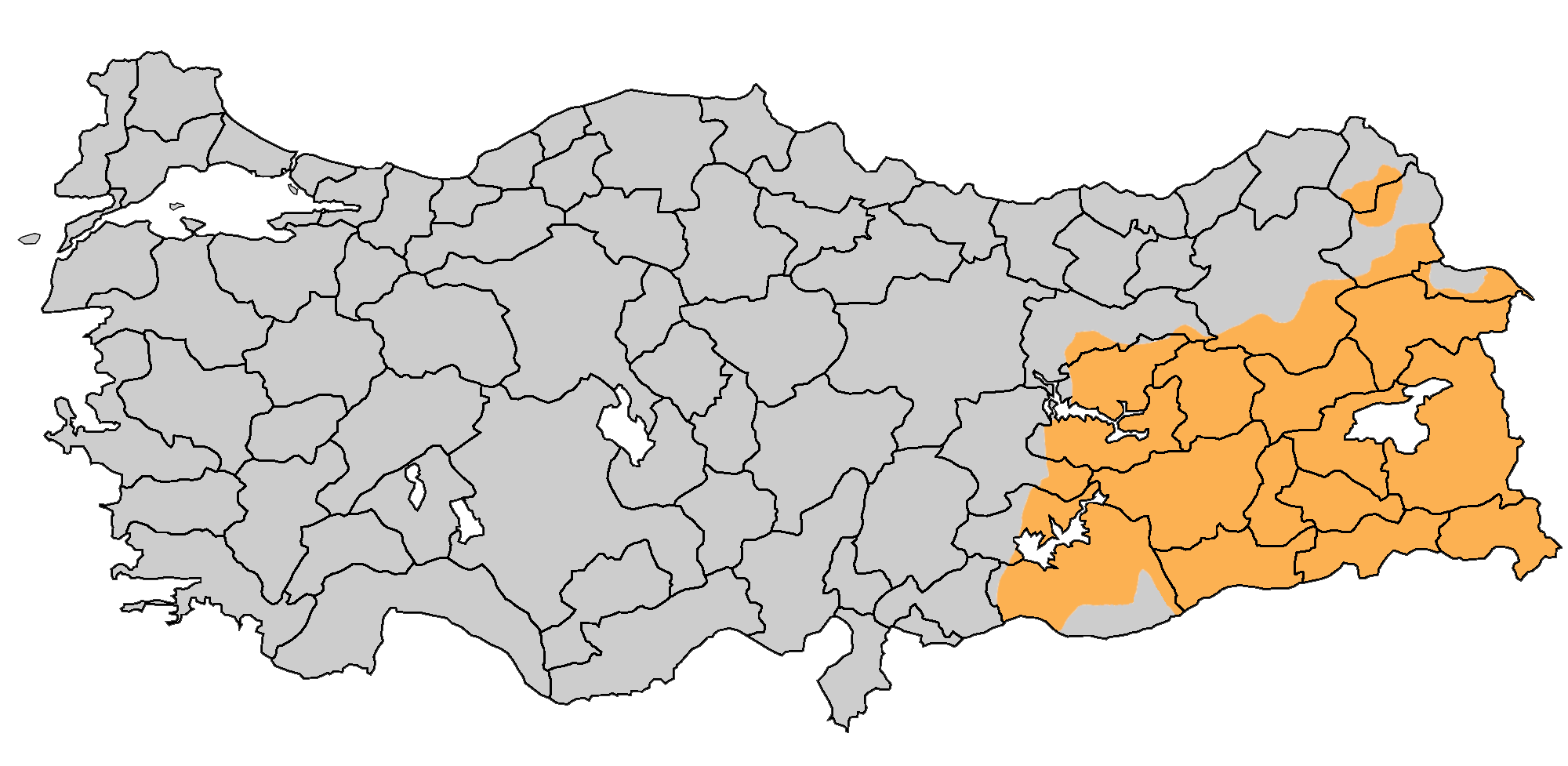
Kurdish-inhabited regions of Turkey according to The World Factbook

Turkish Kurdistan or Northern Kurdistan (Kurdish: Bakurê Kurdistanê) is the southeastern part of Turkey where Kurds form the predominant ethnic group. The Kurdish Institute of Paris estimates that there are 20 million Kurds living in Turkey, the majority of them in the southeast.

Southeastern Turkey (Northern Kurdistan) is considered to be one of the four parts of Kurdistan, which also includes parts of northern Syria (Western Kurdistan), northern Iraq (Southern Kurdistan) and northwestern Iran (Eastern Kurdistan).

== History ==
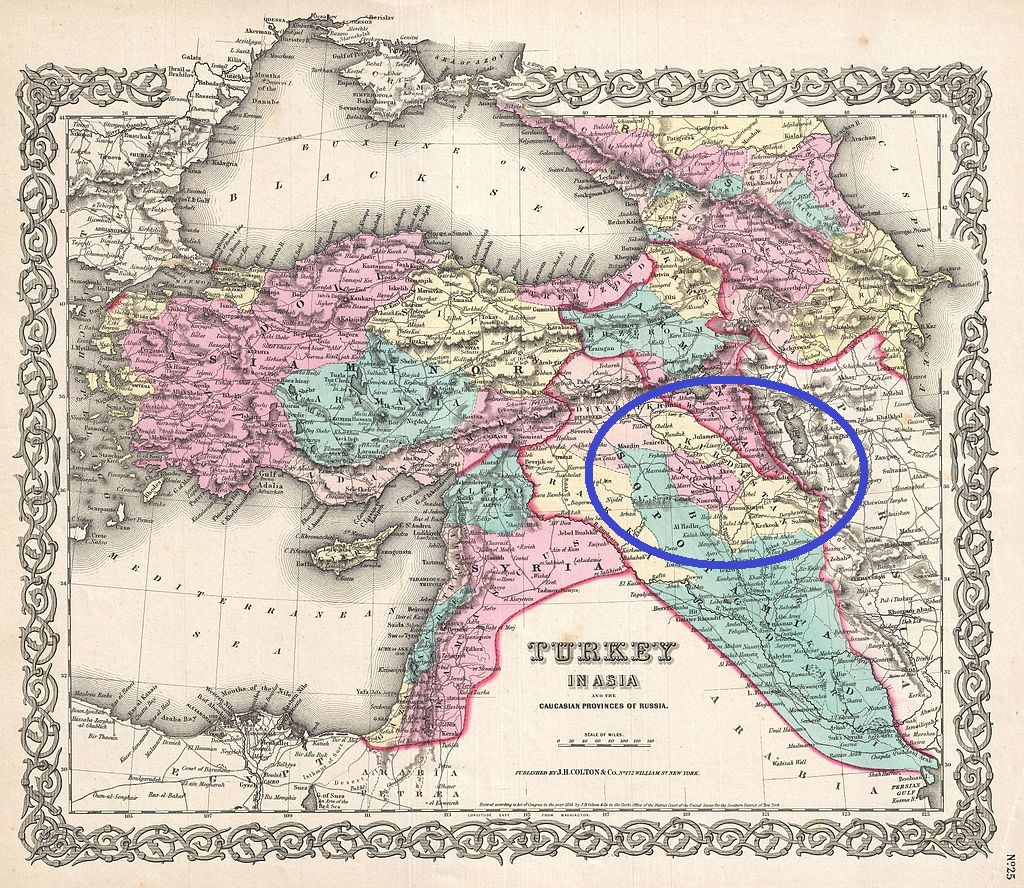
Ottoman Kurdistan in 1855

Part of the Fertile Crescent of the Ancient Near East, Northern Kurdistan was quickly affected by the Neolithic Revolution that saw the spread of agriculture. In the Bronze Age, it was ruled by the Arameans, followed by the Neo-Assyrian Empire in the Iron Age. Classical antiquity saw the arrival of first Greater Armenia, then the Roman Empire. The early Muslim conquests swept over the region with the spread of Islam.

During the Middle Ages, the region came under the rule of local chieftains. In the 10th and 11th centuries, it was ruled by the Kurdish Marwanid dynasty. From the 14th century onwards, the region was mostly incorporated into the Ottoman Empire.

=== Kurdish principalities ===
A tax register (or defter) dating back to 1527 mentions an area called Vilayet-i Kurdistan, which included seven major and 11 minor emirates (or principalities). The document refers to the Kurdish emirates as eyalet (state), an indication of the autonomy they enjoyed. In a Ferman (imperial decree) issued by Suleiman I, around 1533, he outlines the rules of inheritance and succession among Kurdistan beys i.e. the Kurdish aristocracy. Hereditary succession was granted to Kurdish emirates loyal to the Ottoman Empire, and Kurdish princes were granted autonomy within the Empire. The degree of autonomy of these emirates varied greatly and depended on their geopolitical significance. The weak Kurdish tribes were forced to join stronger ones or become a part of Ottoman sanjaks. However, powerful and less accessible tribes, particularly those close to the frontier with Persia, enjoyed a high degree of autonomy.

According to a kanunname (book of law) mentioned by Evliya Çelebi, there were two administrative units different from regular sanjaks: 1) Kurdish sanjaks (Ekrad Beyliği), characterized by the hereditary rule of the Kurdish aristocracy and 2) Kurdish governments (hükümet). The Kurdish sanjaks, like ordinary sanjaks, had military obligations and had to pay taxes. On the other hand, the Kurdish hükümet neither paid taxes nor provided troops for the Ottoman Army, and the Ottomans preferred not to interfere in their succession and internal affairs. According to Çelebi, by the mid-17th century the autonomy of the Kurdish emirates had diminished. At this time, out of 19 sanjaks of the Diyarbekir Eyalet, 12 were regular Ottoman sanjaks, and the remaining were referred to as Kurdish sanjaks. The Kurdish sanjaks were Sagman, Kulp, Mihraniye, Tercil, Atak, Pertek, Çapakçur and Çermik. Çelebi lists the Kurdish states or hükümets as Cezire, Egil, Genç, Palu and Hazo. In the late 18th and early 19th century, with the decline of the Ottoman Empire, the Kurdish principalities became practically independent.

=== Modern history ===
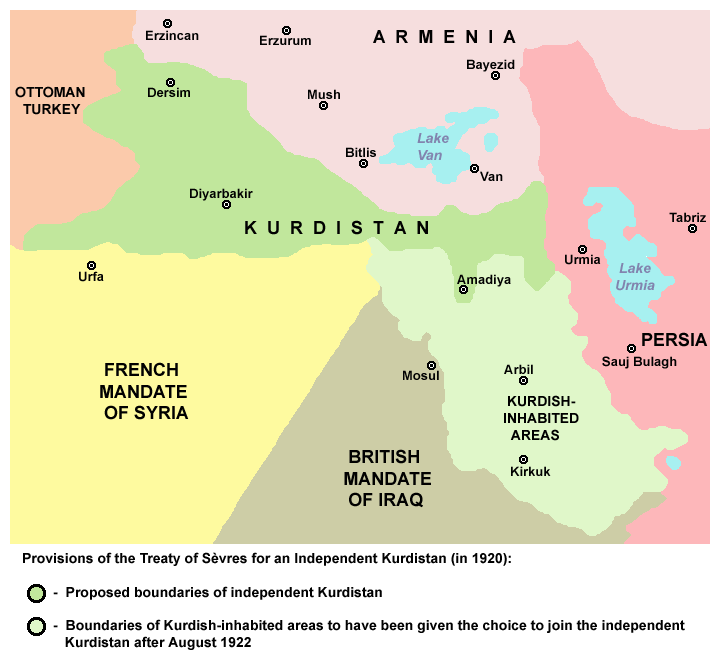
Provisions of the Treaty of Sèvres for an independent Kurdistan (in 1920).

The Ottoman government began to assert its authority in the region in the early 19th century. Concerned with independent-mindedness of Kurdish principalities, Ottomans sought to curb their influence and bring them under the control of the central government in Constantinople. However, removal from power of these hereditary principalities led to more instability in the region from the 1840s onwards. In their place, sufi sheiks and religious orders rose to prominence and spread their influence throughout the region. One of the prominent Sufi leaders was Sheikh Ubeydalla Nahri, who began a revolt in the region between Lakes Van and Urmia. The area under his control covered both Ottoman and Qajar territories. Shaikh Ubaidalla is regarded as one of the earliest leaders who pursued modern nationalist ideas among Kurds. In a letter to a British Vice-Consul, he declared: the Kurdish nation is a people apart. . . we want our affairs to be in our hands.

The breakup of the Ottoman Empire after its defeat in the First World War led to its dismemberment and establishment of the present-day political boundaries, dividing the Kurdish-inhabited regions between several newly created states. The establishment and enforcement of the new borders had profound effects for the Kurds, who had to abandon their traditional nomadism for village life and settled farming.

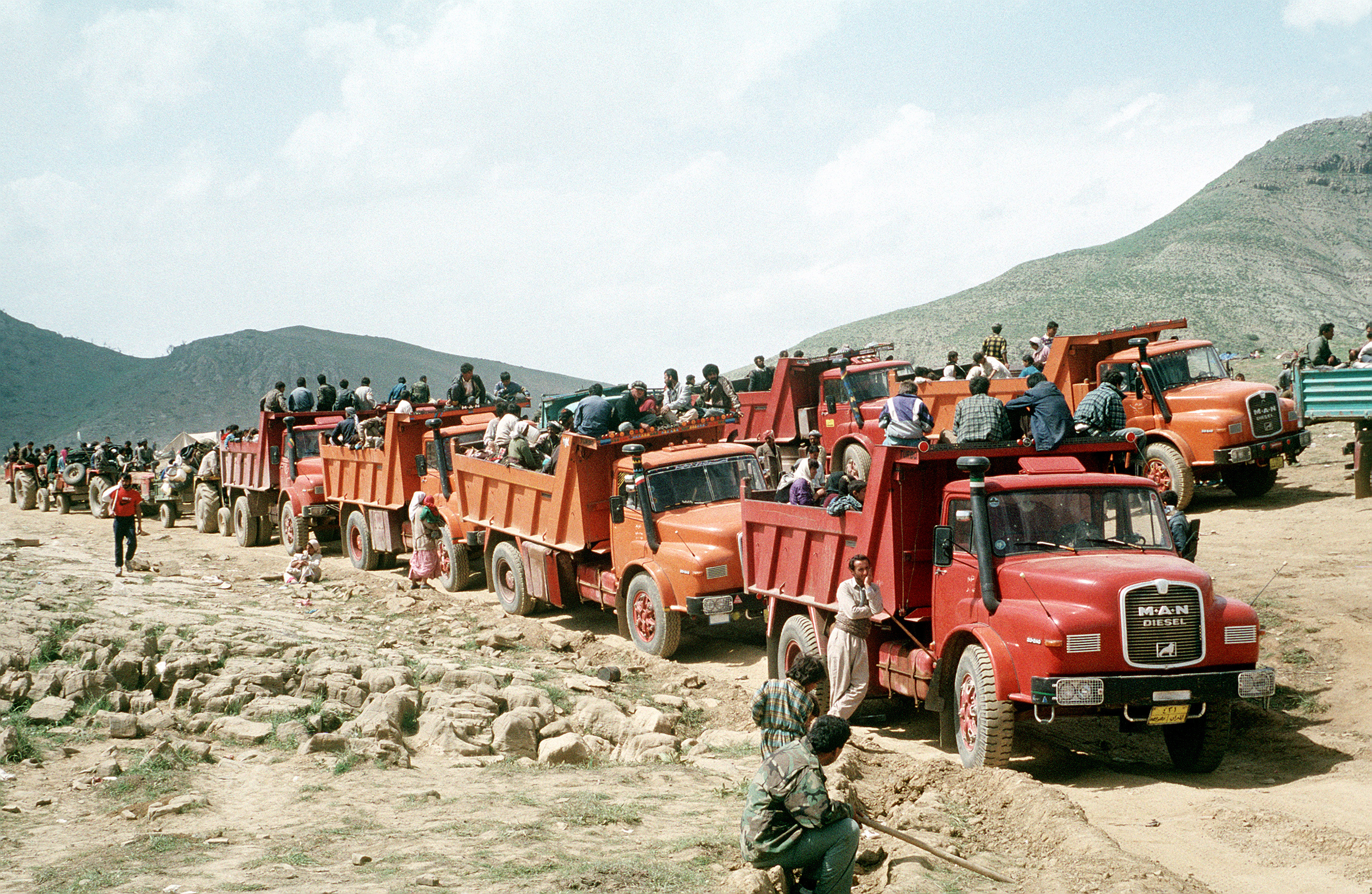
Iraqi Kurds fleeing to Turkey in April 1991, during the Gulf War

==== Conflict and controversy ====
There has been a long-running separatist conflict in Turkey which has cost 30,000 lives, on both sides. The region saw several major Kurdish rebellions during the 1920s and 1930s. These were forcefully put down by the Turkish authorities and the region was declared a closed military area from which foreigners were banned between 1925 and 1965. Kurdish place names were changed and turkified, the use of Kurdish language was outlawed, the words Kurds and Kurdistan were erased from dictionaries and history books, and the Kurds were only referred to as Mountain Turks. Politicians were often prosecuted and sentenced to prison terms for speaking Kurdish.

In 1983, a number of provinces were placed under martial law in response to the activities of the militant separatist Kurdistan Workers Party (PKK). A guerrilla war took place through the rest of the 1980s and into the 1990s. By 1993, the total number of security forces involved in the struggle in southeastern Turkey was about 200,000, and the conflict had become the largest counter-insurgency in the Middle East, in which much of the countryside was evacuated, thousands of Kurdish-populated villages were destroyed, and numerous extra judicial summary executions were carried out by both sides. More than 37,000 people were killed in the violence and hundreds of thousands more were forced to leave their homes. The situation in the region has since eased following the capture of the PKK leader Abdullah Öcalan in 1999 and the introduction of a greater degree of official tolerance for Kurdish cultural activities, encouraged by the European Union. However, some political violence is still ongoing and the Turkish–Iraqi border region remains tense.

==== Kurdification ====
When refugees from Caucasus reached the Ottoman Empire, Constantinople decided not to settle these in Kurdistan due to the extreme poverty and lack of material resources for the refugees. Yet after some time, the Ottomans started seeing the refugees as a chance to diminish the Kurdish claim to the region and allowed the refugees to settle in the region.

From early stage on, some Caucasians went through a voluntary process of Kurdification and thereby had Kurdish as their mother tongue.

When the Kurdish question arose in Turkey, it also had an effect on their Caucasian neighbors. Even today, there is an aversion from joining the Kurds in their conflict against the Turkish state, but some individuals of Caucasian origin joined the Kurdistan Workers' Party. As part of their campaign, Peoples' Democratic Party (HDP) won elections in most Caucasian villages in Turkish Kurdistan.

== Geography ==
The Encyclopaedia of Islam delineates the geography of Turkish Kurdistan as following:

According to Trotter (1878), the limit of their extent to the north was the line Divriği—Erzurum—Kars. In the region of Erzurum they are found especially to the east and the south-east. The Kurds also occupy the western slopes of Ararat, the districts of Kağızman and Tuzluca. On the west they extend in a wide belt beyond the course of the Euphrates, and, in the region of Sivas, in the districts of Kangal and Divriği. Equally, the whole region includes areas to the east and south-east of these limits... Turkish Kurdistān numbers at least 17 of them almost totally: in the north-east, the provinces of Erzincan, Erzurum and Kars; in the centre, going from west to east and from north to south, the provinces of Malatya, Tunceli, Elazığ, Bingöl, Muş, Karaköse (Ağrı), then Adıyaman, Diyarbakır, Siirt, Bitlis and Van; Finally, the southern provinces of Şanlıurfa (Urfa), Mardin and Çölamerik (Hakkarî).

— Bois, T., Minorsky, V. and MacKenzie, D.N., Kurds, Kurdistān, 1960,

== Economy ==
=== Resources ===
Much of the region is fertile and has traditionally exported grain and livestock to the cities in the plains. The local economy is dominated by animal husbandry and small-scale agriculture, with cross-border smuggling to and from Iraqi Kurdistan (especially of petroleum) providing a major source of income in the Iraq-Turkey border area. Larger-scale agriculture and industrial activities dominate the economic life of the lower-lying region around Diyarbakır, the largest Kurdish-majority city in the region. Elsewhere, however, military activity and high unemployment has led to extensive migration from the region to other parts of Turkey and abroad.

== Demographics ==
In the first census of Turkey in 1927, Kurdish was the largest first language in the provinces of Ağrı (58%), Bitlis (75%), Diyarbakır (69%), Elazığ (53%), Hakkâri (89%), Mardin (61%), Siirt (74%, includes present-day Batman) and Van (77%). Moreover, Kurdish was the largest first language with a plurality in Şanlıurfa with 42%. 69% of the population in Muş Province had Kurdish as their first language in the census of 1935, the first census conducted there after the province was split from Bitlis earlier. Bingöl Province was separated from Muş in 1935, while Tunceli Province was separated from Elazığ in 1936 and Kurdish was also the first language in these newly-established provinces in their first census in 1945 with 56% and 53%, respectively.

Moreover, other ethnic groups also exist in Turkish Kurdistan including Arabs, Assyrians, Circassians, Ossetians and Turks. Though the number of non-Kurdish inhabitants is negligible.

Since the 1990s, forced immigration from the southeast has led millions of Kurds to settle in the cities Ankara, Izmir or Istanbul.

There used to be 11 Jewish communities in the Turkish Kurdistan.

=== Education ===
There has been significant conflict in Turkey over the Kurdish populations' linguistic rights. At various points in its history Turkey has enacted laws prohibiting the use of Kurdish in schools. To counter the Dersim rebellion, a turkification process was started by the Turkish government and the Elazığ Girls' Institute (Turkish: Elazığ Kız Enstitüsü, EGI) was opened in 1937. The institute was a boarding school for Kurdish girls and young women who had to learn to speak Turkish with their children which before they were not able to as most of them didn't know Turkish. The girls' school was open until 1959.

In 2014, several Kurdish NGOs and two Kurdish political parties supported a boycott of schools in Northern Kurdistan to promote the right to education in the Kurdish language in all subjects. While Kurdish identity has become more acceptable in Turkish society, the Turkish government has only allowed the Kurdish language to be offered as an elective in schools. The government has refused to honor other demands. In several southeastern cities, Kurds have established private schools to teach classes in Kurdish but the police have been closing down these private schools.

== See also ==
- Armenian highlands
- Denial of Kurds by Turkey
- Western Armenia
- Zagros Mountains
  - Mount Judi
- A Modern History of the Kurds by David McDowall
