= 12th Conference of the International Woman Suffrage Alliance =

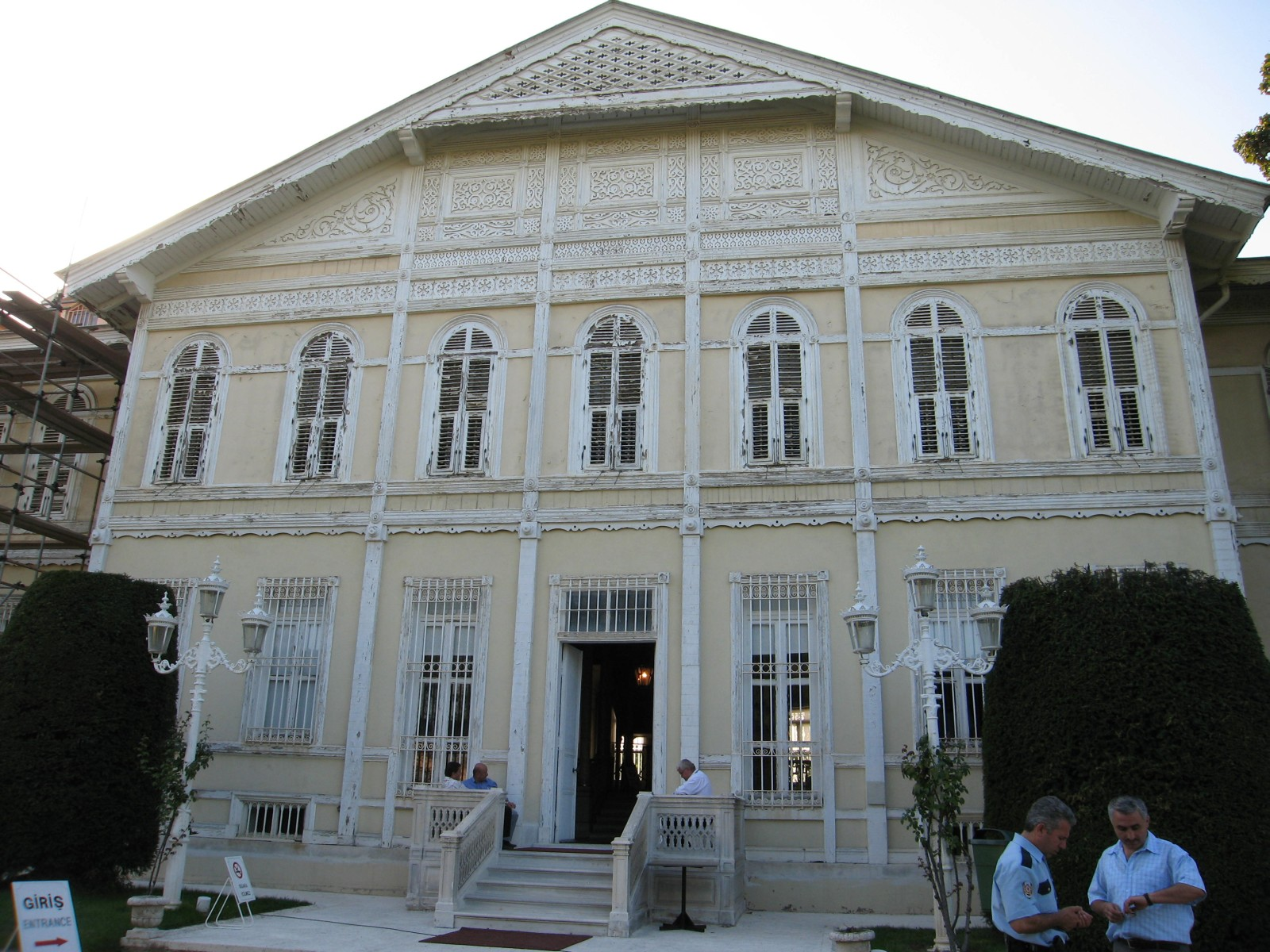
12th Conference of the International Woman Suffrage Alliance took place at the Şale Kiosk

The 12th Conference of the International Woman Suffrage Alliance was an international women's conference which took place in Istanbul, Turkey, on 18–25 April 1935. It was the 12th international conference arranged under the International Alliance of Women.

The conference was held under the chairmanship of Margery Corbett Ashby, the president of the International Woman Suffrage Alliance, and hosted by the Türk Kadinlar Birligi under its president Latife Bekir, who had requested and received permission from the government, and was held at the Yildiz Kiosk, belonging to a residence of the former Ottoman sultan. The delegates where housed at the Hotel Tokatlian.

The principal themes of the conference were stated to be:

- 1. Political Rights: That in all States, whatever their system of Government, women should possess full, free and Identical rights of citizenship with men.
- 2. Economic Rights: That the right to work of all women be recognised and no obstacles be placed in the way of married women who desire to work; that all avenues of work should be open to women and that education for professions and trades should be available for women on the same terms as for men;
- 3. Moral Rights: That the same high moral standard, based on respect for human personality and Inspired by responsibility towards the race, should be recognised both for men and women; that laws and their administration should be based on this principle; that traffic in women should be suppressed;
- 4. Legal Bights: That a woman, unmarried or married, should have full personal and civil rights, including the right to the use and disposal of her property; that she should not be under the tutelage of her husband;
- 5. Peace and the League of Nations: That the entrance of women into political life is necessary to promote the cause of peace; that it is the duty of the women of all nations to work for friendly international relations, to promote the conception of human solidarity.

During the conference, the fact that Turkey had recently introduced women's suffrage was celebrated by the International Alliance of Women, and after the Conference, the women's organization Türk Kadinlar Birligi was dissolved by its president Latife Bekir, who declared that Turkey had now reached its goal in the issue of women's rights, after which the Turkish women's movement was inducted into the ruling government party.
