= Elazığ Girls' Institute =

School in Turkey

The Elazığ Girls' Institute (Turkish: Elazığ Kız Enstitüsü, EGI) was a boarding school for Kurdish girls and young women established in Elazığ, Turkey. The boarding school was opened in 1937 to counter the Kurdish Dersim rebellion.

== Establishment ==
On Mustafa Kemal Atatürk's orders, the Minister of the Interior Sükrü Kaya supervised the creation of an environment which permitted the Turkification of the Kurdish girls and the raising of future Turks. In 1937, the Inspector General Abdullah Alpdoğan of the Fourth Inspectorate General demanded that the Girls Institute was to be established in a building which originally was to be the new hospital of Elazığ. The city Elazığ was chosen as it had a Turkish speaking and Sunni muslim majority at the time.

== Organization ==
The recruited girls were a divided into two departments. The first was for the daughters of civil servants and they received a regular high school curriculum. The second department was for Kurdish girls including the daughters of tribal leaders, orphans from parents killed in clashes with the Turkish army or girls abducted from rebels. Those students had to go through a three-year-long assimilation process, which included learning basic housekeeping. The Kurdish girls were not expected to continue with their education but to carry Turkish ideals to the Kurdish rural population. The school was intended to create housewives and mothers who would speak Turkish with their children. The institute was described as transforming "savage Kurdish" girls into "civilized" i.e. "Turkicised" young women and compared to an American factory where cows entered at one end and sausages came out the other. Of the Kurdish alumni, photographs from the time of their arrival and their departure from the institute were taken to show the progress in their assimilation towards Turkishness. As Kurdish names were seen as detrimental to the assimilation process, many alumni had their names changed into a Turkish one upon their arrival to the boarding school. The assimilation process was observed by several Turkish politicians and bureaucrats including the Turkish President İsmet İnönü who visited the school in person.

=== Recruiting of students ===
Initially the students were mainly from the Dersim region, but others were also from Çermik, Ergani or Diyarbakir province. At the time, the local population did not send their girls into school, and they doubted if their daughters would be treated well if they sent them to the Girls Institute. But there was little they could do, the order to send a girl per village to the institute came from the Inspector General. In later years, when the recruiting process was supervised by a civilian, resistant villagers disguised the girls as boys or married them off so they were not taken.

== History ==
For the first year, twenty-eight girls were recruited as students. From 1939 onwards, the school was for most of the time administered by Sıdıka Avar, a Turkish teacher from Istanbul, who became the principal of the institute. She left the school for a short period in 1942 to work at the Tokat Girls' institute, but returned in 1943. She transformed the teaching from an authoritarian and punitive style to a more compelling cooperative one. Avar forbade the use of their native language in the students' private communication and the teaching of the Turkish language was a major part of the curriculum in the first year. After having observed the progress the girls made when they accomplished their three-year-long education and returned to their villages, she noticed that the girls often faced difficulties readapting to the village life. She demanded a better education for the best of the students, so they would be able to become teachers like herself. The Inspectorate General granted permission and the first graduates of the further education were sent as teachers to the Akçadağ Village Institute. Avar taught about a thousand girls until the school was closed and she had to leave. In 1959, under the Government of the Democrat Party, the section for girls from Dersim was closed.
