= Sıdıka Avar =

Turkish teacher (1901–1979)

Sıdıka Avar (born 1901, Cihangir, Istanbul – 1979, Istanbul) was a Turkish teacher known for having been the principal of the Elazığ Girls’ Institute (EGI) between 1939 and 1959. She is described of having been of one of the Turkish national heroines and an example for the Turkification of the Kurdish population.

== Early life and education ==
She was born to Mehmet bey, an Ottoman civil servant and a housewife. She trained as a teacher at the Çapa Girls college and from 1922 onwards she worked at the Circassian Girls college in Besiktas, Istanbul. In 1920s, she and her partner moved to Izmir where she found employed as a teacher at the local Jewish school and the American College for Girls. Besides she also was volunteering to educate the female prisoners in Izmir.

== Elazig Girls Institute ==
After several requests from her side, she finally was assigned to the Elazig Girls Institute in 1939 and after two months she was promoted to the principal of the Institute. She was briefly assigned as an assistant director to the Tokat Girls Institute in 1942, but returned to Elazig in 1943 where she remained until her retiring in 1959. Initially Avar had difficulties to recruit girls as her pupils as the villagers doubted the girls were to be treated well in the institute. She was sort of idealistic in the Turkification of the Kurds, and developed strategies on how to achieve the demanded result in a cooperative manner. According to Zeynep Türkylmaz, Avar appealed to the necessity to win the hearts and minds of the Kurdish girls and make them love Turkishness. She prohibited the beating of the alumni, but at the same time also the use of their native language. She was so successful at this that with time the girls felt that Turkish was superior to their Kurdish or Zazaki language. Avar kept before-and-after images of the process of the raising of a new civilized Turkish speaking woman from a Kurdish girl. Avar also changed to recruiting process of the students as she asked the Inspector General to be allowed to recruit the girls herself, and that not the soldiers would force the villagers to hand the girls over to the institute. While she prohibited the use of the native language of her students she made use of the Kurdish language while recruiting them. According to her, a hello in Kurdish could be the beginning of a lasting relationship. Avar taught about a thousand girls until the school was closed and she had to leave. In 1959, under the Government of the Democrat Party, the section for girls from Dersim was closed.

== Legacy ==
Being described as a national heroine of the Turkish Republic she revolutionized the way the states approach towards the Kurds. Her teachings to the Kurdish population are seen as an example of the Kemalist approach regarding the Kurds.

== Personal life ==
She was married and the mother of one child. She divorced he partner in 1937, before she went to teach at the Elazig Girls Institute. The fact that she decided to leave her own chid behind as she went to the east, was contrary to the Kemalist traditional family seen as the basics for a successful country.

== Memoirs ==
Dağ Çiçeklerim - My Mountain Flowers
