= Inspectorates-General (Turkey) =

Former Turkish regional administrative subdivision

Inspectorates-General or General Inspectorates (Turkish: Umumi Müfettişlikler) was a regional governorship whose authorities prevailed over civilian, military and judicial institutions under their domain but had to comply with the orders of Turkish president Mustafa Kemal Atatürk. Their aim was to establish an authoritarian rule and to consolidate the authority in the process of Turkification of religious and ethnic minorities.

The Turkish Grand National Assembly got the law numbered 1164 and dated June 25, 1927, passed. On January 1, 1928, the First Inspectorate-General (Birinci Umumi Müfettişlik) including the provinces of Diyarbakır, Elazığ, Urfa, Bitlis, Van, Hakkâri, Siirt and Mardin was established with the center in Diyarbakır.

Before Thrace pogroms, on February 19, 1934, the Second Inspectorate-General (İkinci Umumi Müfettişlik) including Kırklareli, Edirne, Tekirdağ and Çanakkale provinces, was established with the center in Edirne

On August 25, 1935, the Third Inspectorate-General (Üçüncü Umumi Müfettişlik) including Ağrı, Kars, Artvin, Rize, Trabzon, Gümüşhane, Erzincan and Erzurum provinces, was established with the center in Erzurum.

Before Dersim Rebellion, on June 6, 1936, the Fourth Inspectorate-General (Dördüncü Umumi Müffetişlik) was established in historical Dersim region that includes Tunceli, Elazığ and Bingöl provinces, with the center in Elazığ.

In December 1936 a conference of the Inspector-Generals of all the four Inspectorates-Generals together with the Minister of the Interior Şükrü Kaya was held and an evaluation of the Turkification program was prepared. The Inspector-Generals compared their results for three days. The First Inspectorate-General Abidin Özmen demanded a closure of the border with Syria as he complained that from Syria the Kurds, Yazidis and Armenians received support.

The Inspectorates General were disestablished in 1952 under the government of the Democrat Party.

== See also ==
- OHAL
- Martial law and state of emergency in Turkey
