= Türk Kadınlar Birliği =

Turkish women's association

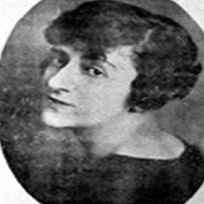
Nezihe Muhiddin, founder of the Türk Kadınlar Birliği

Türk Kadınlar Birliği (Turkish Women's Union) was a women's organization in Turkey, founded in 1924. It was the main women's suffrage organization in Turkey. It played a significant part in the history of the Turkish women's movement.

== History ==
In 1923, after the foundation of the Turkish Republic, the Women's People Party was founded by Nezihe Muhiddin. However, the party could not be registered, because women's suffrage had not been provided for in the new state. In response, Nezihe Muhiddin founded the Türk Kadınlar Birliği to work for the introduction of women's suffrage.

President Mustafa Kemal Atatürk was willing to meet most of the demands of the Turkish women's movement, and did so with three major reforms: by inducting women in the state education system along with men; by introducing the Swiss Civil Code of 1926, giving Turkish women the same rights as Swiss women; and finally by introducing women's suffrage in 1935. The Türk Kadinlar Birligi, under the leadership of Latife Bekir, voiced their support for these secular reforms as well as for the unveiling of women.

The organization hosted the Twelfth Conference of the International Woman Suffrage Alliance in Istanbul in 1935. That same year, Mustafa Kemal Atatürk introduced women's suffrage. Their goal having been achieved, the President of the organization, Latife Bekir, dissolved the organization the same year. Most of the women elected to Parliament in 1935 were members of the Türk Kadınlar Birliği.

After the dissolution of the Turkish Women's Union, the Turkish women's movement merged with the Secular Kemal's party. An independent Turkish women's movement did not emerge until the 1980s.
