= Martial law and state of emergency in Turkey =

Since 1940, Turkey has frequently been under extraordinary rule, either the whole of the country or specific provinces. According to Articles 119–122 of the 1982 Constitution the four types of extraordinary rule are martial law (sıkıyönetim), state of emergency (olağanüstü hâl, OHAL), mobilization (seferberlik) and situation of war (savaş hâli). Martial law has been abolished and all other forms have been merged into single form of state of emergency since 2017 amendment to Turkish constitution.

== History ==
On 27 December 2001 constitutional law professor Dr. Zafer Üskül presented some details in the daily Radikal. The first law passed in 1940 was called law on extraordinary administration (İdare-i Örfiye Kanunu). It was replaced in 1971 by Martial Law. The first law on state of emergency, mobilization and war was passed under military rule in 1983.

== Legal background ==
Article 119 of Turkish constitution regulates state of emergency.

== Imposition of martial law ==
At the end of 2001 law professor Dr. Zafer Üskül stated that 40 of its 78 years the Republic of Turkey had, in some or other part of it, been under extraordinary rule. In December 1978 martial law was imposed in 13 provinces in response to violent incidents in Kahramanmaraş. During the nine months after the Kahramanmaraş riots the government extended martial law to cover 20 provinces. When the military seized power on 12 September 1980 the five generals of the General Staff announced martial law in all of the existing 67 provinces of Turkey. From December 1983 military rule was gradually withdrawn. It was finally lifted throughout Turkey in July 1987.

On 1 July 1982 five states (Denmark, Norway, Sweden, France and the Netherlands) filed an application against Turkey with the European Commission of Human Rights. In December 1985 a friendly settlement was reached that demanded that Turkey should lift martial law within 18 months. Turkey did as requested, only to replace martial law by emergency legislation.

== State of emergency after the 2016 coup attempt ==
Following the failed coup attempt of 15 July 2016, Turkey declared a nationwide state of emergency on 20 July 2016, which remained in force until 18 July 2018. During this period, the government ruled extensively by emergency decree-laws (Kanun Hükmünde Kararname, KHK), which were not subject to effective parliamentary or judicial oversight.

According to official figures and reports by international organisations, approximately 125,000 public sector employees, including judges, prosecutors, academics, teachers, police officers and military personnel—were dismissed or suspended by decree-laws, often without individualized reasoning or immediate access to judicial remedies. The Venice Commission expressed concern over the broad scope and permanent effects of these measures, noting the absence of sufficient procedural safeguards and effective judicial review.

Emergency legislation also led to significant restrictions on fundamental freedoms. Public assemblies and demonstrations were banned or subjected to strict authorization regimes in many provinces, while more than 1,500 associations and foundations were closed by decree. Numerous media outlets, including newspapers, television channels and radio stations, were shut down on grounds of alleged links to terrorist organisations.

Criminal procedure rules were modified to extend police custody periods, at times up to thirty days, and to expand police powers. The United Nations Working Group on Arbitrary Detention issued several opinions concerning detentions carried out during the state of emergency, finding that certain practices failed to comply with Turkey’s international human rights obligations.

The state of emergency also had a profound impact on judicial independence. In the aftermath of the coup attempt, approximately 4,000 judges and prosecutors were arrested or dismissed, prompting concerns from the Council of Europe and the European Union regarding the institutional independence of the judiciary. Several emblematic cases, including those of Ahmet Altan, Selahattin Demirtaş and Osman Kavala, were later examined by the European Court of Human Rights, which found violations of procedural and substantive rights.

== See also ==
- Politics of Turkey
- Human rights in Turkey
- State of emergency
- Martial law
- 1960 Turkish coup d'état
- 1971 Turkish coup d'état
- 1980 Turkish coup d'état
- Kurdish–Turkish conflict
- Inspectorates-General
