= Second Inspectorate General (Turkey) =

- Regional Subdivision
- İkinci Umumi Müfettişlik
- Foundation: 1934
- Disestablishment: 1952
- Provinces: Edirne; Çanakkale; Kırklareli; Tekirdağ

Government
  - Type: Inspectorate General
  - Inspectorate General: Ibrahim Tali Öngören (1934–1935); Kazim Dirik (1935–1941); Abidin Özmen (1941–1948)

The Second Inspectorate-General (Turkish: İkinci Umumi Müfettişlik or Trakya Umumi Müfettişi) refers to a Turkish regional administrative subdivision comprising the provinces Edirne, Çanakkale, Kırklareli and Tekirdağ.

The second Inspectorate General (Turkish: Umumi Müfettişlik, UM) was created on the 19 February 1934 and its capital was seated in the city Edirne. It was governed by a so-called Inspector General who had wide-ranging authority over civilian, military and juridical matters. The task of the Inspector General was to develop the Turkish territories bordering Europe and populate them with muslim settlers. İbrahim Talî Öngören was appointed the first Inspector General and in order to perceive a perspective of the tasks to be performed, he toured the UM in May and June 1934. In June 1934 he presented report about the state of the region to the government in Ankara. The report had a very hostile approach towards the local Jews, Öngören labeled the Jews as the "bloodsucking parasites of Turkish blood" and accused them of taking advantage of their economic positions in regards of the muslim population. Soon after he delivered the report, the Thrace pogroms began. For health reasons, Öngören had to resign from the post in August 1935 and Kâzım Dirik assumed as Inspector General and served as such until his death in 1941. Following, Abidin Özmen was appointed Inspectorate General, who held the post until 1948. After this date, the office of the Inspectorate Generals was not reoccupied, but the legal framework stayed until it was abolished in 1952, during the Government of the Democrat Party.
