= Diyarbakır Province =

Province of Turkey

Coordinates: 38°08′32″N 40°16′16″E

Diyarbakır Province Diyarbakır ili
- Province and metropolitan municipality
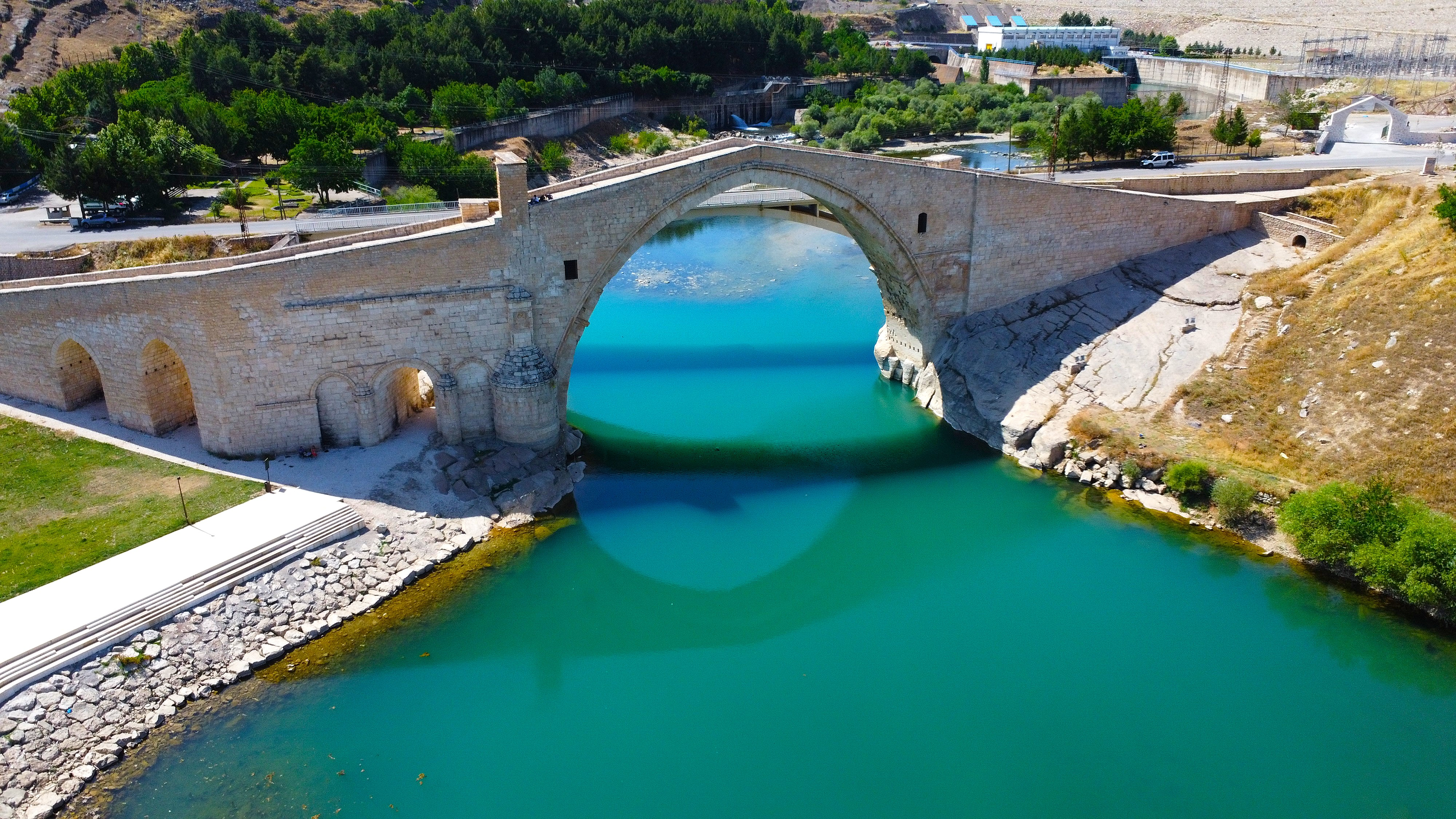
- Malabadi Bridge in Diyarbakır Province

- Location of the province within Turkey
- Country: Turkey
- Seat: Diyarbakır

Government
  - Governor: Selçuk Aslan
- Area: 15,101 km^{2} (5,831 sq mi)
- Population (2022): 1,804,880
  - Density: 119.52/km^{2} (309.56/sq mi)
- Time zone: UTC+3 (TRT)
- Area code: 0412
- Website: www.diyarbakir.bel.tr www.diyarbakir.gov.tr

Diyarbakır Province (Turkish: Diyarbakır ili; Zazaki: Suke Dîyarbekîr; Kurdish: Parêzgeha Amedê) is a province and metropolitan municipality in southeastern Turkey. Its area is 15,101 km^{2}, and its population is 1,804,880 (2022). The provincial capital is the city of Diyarbakır. The Kurdish majority province is part of Turkish Kurdistan.

== History ==
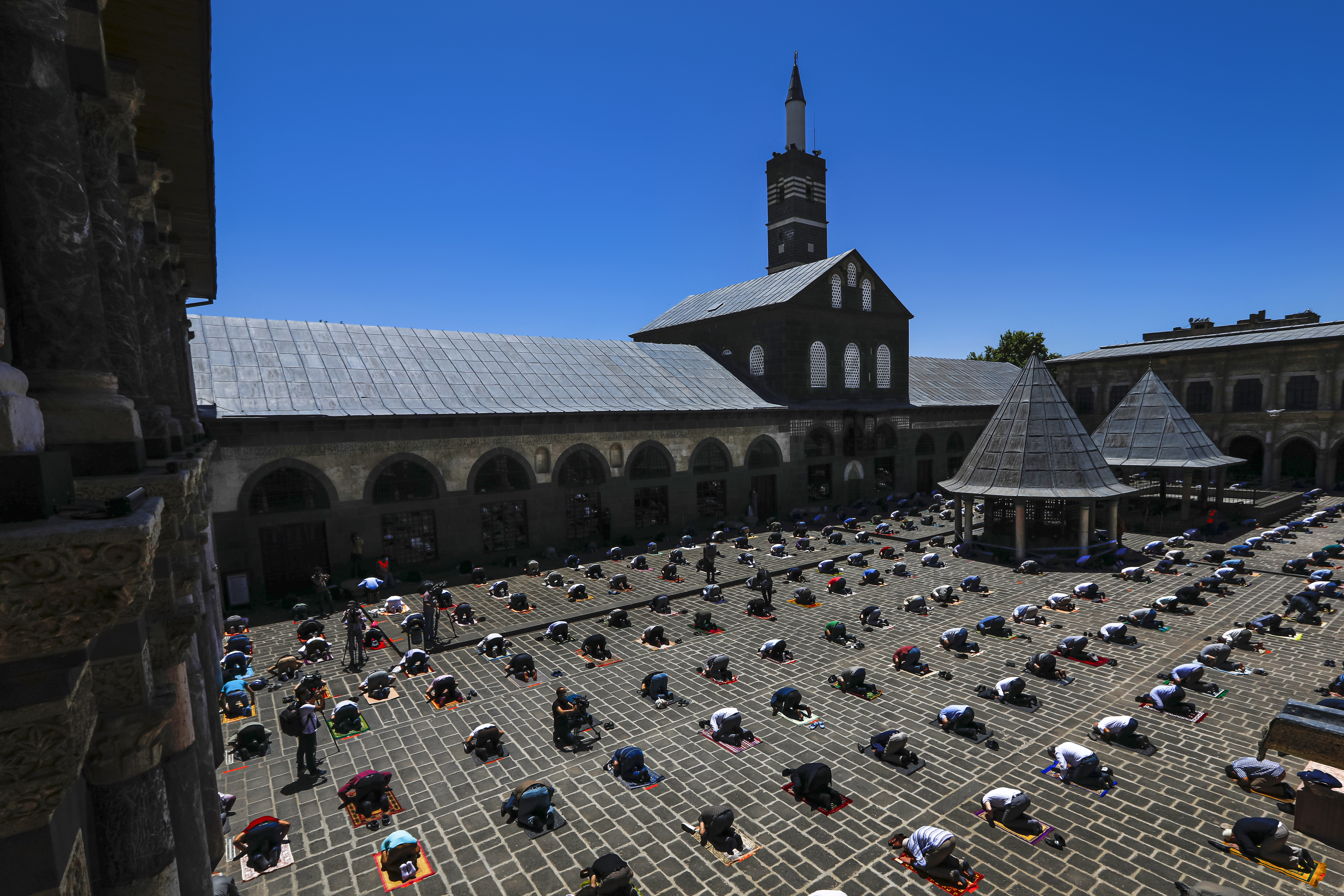
The Great Mosque of Diyarbakır

It has been home to many civilisations and the surrounding area including itself is home to many Mesolithic era stone carvings and artifacts. The province has been ruled by the Akkadians, Hurrians, Mittani, Medes, Hittites, Armenians, Arameans, Neo-Babylonians, Achaemenids, Greeks, Romans, Parthians, Byzantium, Sassanids, Arabs, Seljuk Empire, Mongol Empire, Safavid dynasty, Marwanids, and Ayyubids.

=== Administrative history ===
In June 1927, the Law 1164 was passed allowing the creation of Inspectorates-General (Turkish: Umumi Müffetişlik).

The Diyarbakır province was therefore included in the First Inspectorate General (Turkish: Birinci Umumi Müffetişlik), which was created on the 1 January 1928 and also included Hakkâri, Siirt, Van, Mardin, Bitlis, Sanlıurfa, and Elaziğ.

The Inspectorate-General was governed by an Inspector General, who governed with a wide-ranging authority over civilian, juridical and military matters. The office of the Inspector General was dissolved in 1952 during the government of the Democrat Party.

During the 1930s, several place-names in the province were renamed into names which denoted a Turkish origin as part of the nationalist Turkification policy of the Kemalist government. Travel to Diyarbakır province was banned for foreign citizens until 1965.

==== Modern history ====
In the 1975 Lice earthquake a M_{s} 6.7 struck the town of Lice. The town was re-established about 2 km (1.2 mi) south of its original location.

From 1987 to 2002, Diyarbakır Province was part of the OHAL (state of emergency) region which was declared to counter the Kurdistan Workers' Party (PKK) and governed by a so-called Supergovernor who got invested with additional powers than a normal Governor. In 1987 he was given the power to relocate and resettle whole villages, settlements and hamlets. In December 1990 with the Decree No. 430, the supergovernor and the provincial governors in the OHAL region received immunity against any legal prosecution in connections with actions they made due to the powers they received with the Decree No. 430.

=== Archaeology ===
Archaeologists headed by the vice-rector of Dicle University, professor Ahmet Tanyıldız, have claimed to discover the graves of the Seljuk Sultan of Rum Kilij Arslan I, who defeated the Crusaders. They also revealed his daughter Saide Hatun's burial in Silvan. Researchers dug 2 meters deep across a 35-square-meter area and focused their works on two gravesites in Orta Çeşme Park.

In 2026, archaeologists announced genetic research on skeletal remains from Çayönü Hill in the Ergani district, shedding light on the lives of people who inhabited the site around 12,000 years ago. Çayönü, a major Neolithic settlement on the Tigris River with occupation layers dating back to 10,000 BCE, has yielded extensive architectural remains, burials and artefacts that illustrate early transitions from nomadic to settled life and the development of agriculture. Excavations resumed in 2025 under the direction of archaeologists from Çanakkale Onsekiz Mart and Hacettepe universities, involving researchers from multiple Turkish institutions. Analysis of bones and DNA from individuals at the site including skeletal material from Neolithic, Pottery Neolithic and Early Bronze Age contexts aims to reconstruct population history, health, sociocultural practices and connections with broader regions such as Mesopotamia and the Caucasus. Researchers report that skeletal and genetic evidence indicates a heterogeneous community with varied burial traditions, shared subsistence activities and regional interaction networks, and that forthcoming DNA results could clarify how these ancient populations fit into wider prehistoric sociocultural landscapes.

== Districts ==
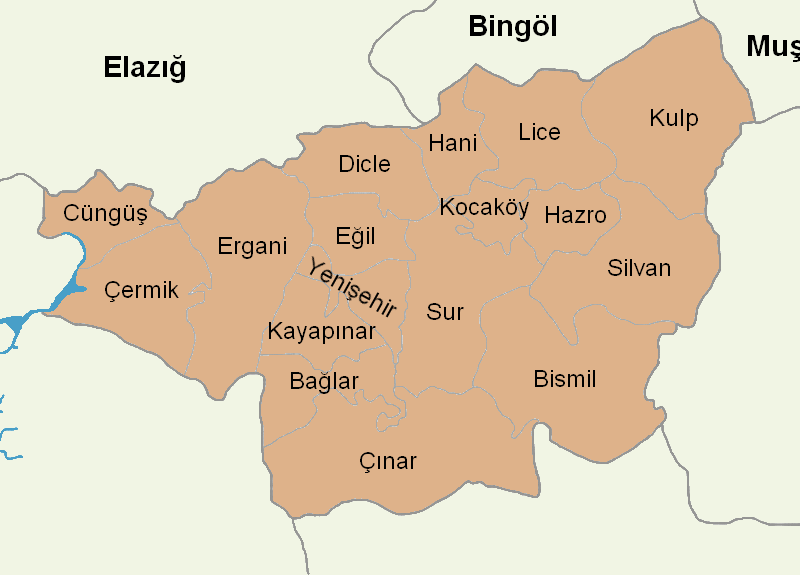

Diyarbakır province is divided into 17 districts:

- Bismil
- Bağlar
- Çermik
- Çınar
- Çüngüş
- Dicle
- Eğil
- Ergani
- Hani
- Hazro
- Kayapınar
- Kocaköy
- Kulp
- Lice
- Silvan
- Sur
- Yenişehir

== Population ==
Assyrian and Armenian population in Diyarbakır Province in 1915-1916
	Sect	Before World War I	Disappeared (killed)	After World War I
Armenians	Gregorians (Apostolic)	60,000	58,000 (97%)	2,000
Armenians	Armenian Catholics	12,500	11,500 (92%)	1,000
Assyrians	Chaldean Catholics	11,120	10,010 (90%)	1,110
Assyrians	Syriac Catholic	5,600	3,450 (62%)	2,150
Assyrians	Syriac Orthodox	84,725	60,725 (72%)	24,000
Assyrians	Protestants	725	500 (69%)	2,150

== See also ==
- Diyarbakır Vilayet
- Kurdistan Eyalet
- Diyarbekir Eyalet
