= First Inspectorate-General (Turkey) =

- Inspectorate-General
- Birinci Umumi Müfettişlik
- Country: Turkey
- Provinces: Mardin; Siirt; Hakkâri; Elazığ; Bitlis; Şanlıurfa; Van; Ağrı; Şırnak
- Establishment: 1 January 1928
- Disestablishment: 1952
- Seat: Diyarbakır

Government
  - Inspector-Generals: İbrahim Tali Öngören; Hilmi Ergenli; Abidin Özmen

The First Inspectorate-General (Turkish: Birinci Umumi Müfettişlik) refers to a former regional administrative area in Turkey. The First Inspectorate-General span over the provinces Hakkâri, Siirt, Şırnak, Mardin, Şanlıurfa, Bitlis, Elazığ and Van.

== Background ==
After the suppression of the Sheikh Said revolt in the spring of 1925, Kemal Atatürk established the Reform Council for the East (Turkish: Şark İslahat Encümeni) which prepared the Report for Reform in the East (Turkish: Şark İslahat Raporu) which encouraged the creation of Inspectorates-Generals (Turkish: Umumi Müfettişlikler, UMs) in the areas comprising a majority Kurdish population.

== History ==
The First Inspectorate-General was created on 1 January 1928 and based on Law 1164, passed in June 1927. The headquarters of the Inspectorate General was to be in the city of Diyarbakır and İbrahim Tali Öngören was appointed its Inspector-General. He had extended authority over military, juridical and civilian matters. An infrastructure program including railways, schools, and a land reform was elaborated for the region. As a result of the land reform, the possessions of the Kurdish elite were divided and a British traveler noted in 1930 that there was no wealthy Kurd left in the region. An efficient turkification policy was carried out in the Inspectorate General, meant to teach the Kurds of their alleged Turkish heritage. The assimilation policy was perceived such a success, that in an attempt to curb the Ararat rebellion, the province of Ağrı (then named Karaköse province) was included in the Inspectorate General. In 1930, the Turkish Foreign minister Tevfik Rüştü Aras, outlined the Turkish approach regarding the Kurds in Geneva, which included a military occupation of the regions in question and a disarmament of the population. In April 1932, a new Five-Year plan for Security and Disarmament was announced in which the soldiers of the Seventh Corps of the Turkish Army were to be involved in the expected battles. Tali Öngören ordered the deportation of several hundred Kurds to the west of Turkey and by the end of the year, he reported thousands of weapons confiscated in the campaign. The Ministry of the Interior reported that by September the Districts of Siverek, Derik and Viranşehir were disarmed. Şükrü Kaya, the Minister of the Interior at the time, elaborated detailed reports about the weapons confiscated to Prime Minister Ismet Inönü. In January 1933 Öngören resigned from the post of Inspector-General and was succeeded by Hilmi Ergeneli who served until 1935. During Ergenelis's term as Inspector General, a Resettlement Law was enacted in 1934 which provided the guidelines where Turks and Kurds were to be allowed to settle and enabled the Kemalists to Turkify the rebellious regions. People of Turkish heritage, specially those of Turkish race, were encouraged to live along the rail tracks and the paved roads in the province of Diyarbakır. Anyone who was classified as related to the Kurdish tribal leaders by the Inspector Generals office, was to be deported from Diyarbakir. Abidin Özmen succeeded Ergeneli, and attended the conference of all the Governors of the Inspectorates-General with the Minister of the Interior Şükrü Kaya in December 1936 in Ankara. In 1937 the Turks still faced some resistance by Kurdish rebels and once a group around Mehmed Cemilpasazade attacked and killed a state prosecutor from Diyarbakir in the countryside. This caused a furious response by Kaya, and the Chief of Staff Fevzi Çakmak ordered a closer collaboration between the Turkish Army and the Inspectorate General was agreed upon. Özmen served until 1943. The idea of governing the region within Inspectorate-Generals was left behind in 1948, but the First Inspectorate-Generals legal status was only abolished in 1952, during the Government of the Democrat Party.

== Literature ==
- Bayir, Derya (2016-04-22). Minorities and Nationalism in Turkish Law. Routledge. pp. 139–141. ISBN 978-1-317-09579-8. OCLC 1306581946.
- Üngör, Uğur Ümit (2011). The making of modern Turkey : nation and state in Eastern Anatolia, 1913-1950. Oxford: Oxford University Press. ISBN 978-0-19-960360-2. OCLC 732286833.
- Cagaptay, Soner (2006-05-02). Islam, Secularism and Nationalism in Modern Turkey: Who is a Turk?. Routledge. ISBN 978-1-134-17448-5. OCLC 1027167702.
- Üngör, Umut (2009). "Young Turk social engineering : mass violence and the nation state in eastern Turkey, 1913- 1950" (PDF). University of Amsterdam.
- Strohmeier, Martin (2003). Crucial Images in the Presentation of a Kurdish National Identity: Heroes and Patriots, Traitors and Foes. Brill. ISBN 978-90-04-12584-1. OCLC 55505613.
- Kasaba, Reşat (2008). The Cambridge history of Turkey, Volume 4. Turkey in the Modern World. New York. ISBN 9780521620963. OCLC 660688687.
