= Nezihe Muhiddin =

Turkish women's rights activist, suffragette, journalist (1889-1958)

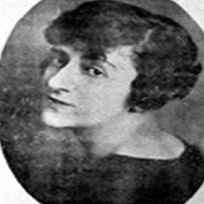

Personal details
- Born: 1889 Constantinople, Ottoman Empire
- Died: 10 February 1958 (aged 68–69) Istanbul, Turkey
- Occupation: Activist, journalist, writer

Nezihe Muhiddin Tepedelengil (1889 – 10 February 1958) was a Turkish women's rights activist, suffragette, journalist, writer and political leader.

In the 20th century Ottoman Empire, Nezihe Muhiddin was a pioneer of the women's movement who fought to ensure the recognition of women's political rights after declaration of republican regime. She became one of leading names of the First Wave Republican feminists. Even before the establishment of the Republican People's Party, Nezihe Muhiddin completed the formation of Women's People's Party (KHF) in 1923 and became the founder of the first political party in Turkey. She also served as a president of the Women's Union between 1924 and 1927, and helped the founding process of the journal named Turk Kadin Yolu.

She is a writer who has written 20 novels, 300 stories, plays, screenplays, operettas.

== Life ==
=== Early life and education ===
She was born in Kandilli, Istanbul in 1889. She's the daughter of a prosecutor and criminal judge Mr. Muhiddin. She completed her education with lessons from private teachers and did not receive higher education. She studied privately at home and learned Persian, Arabic, German, French. From her early teenage years, she grew up liable to political and social issues and the women's condition. Nezihe Muhiddin's cousin and her mother's debates and discussion on literature and social problems led the way of Muhiddin's ideology.

She expresses that she sees the greatest contribution in terms of education from her cousin Nakiye Hanım. According to her, Nakiye Hanım is an exemplary Turkish woman who has experienced the modern type of woman, so her thoughts carry a lot of traces from her.

She kept using her father's surname, Muhiddin, in her literary works instead of the surname of her second husband.

=== Career and literary works ===
She is the founder of the first party of the Republic of Turkey, Kadınlar Halk Fırkası (People's Party for Women or Women's People Party) in July 1923. KHF was founded for the political and social rights of women. Due to the political situation during the time, it was not recognized officially by the modern Turkish state.

== Women's People Party ==
In 1923, before the proclamation of the Republic, Nezihe Muhiddin and thirteen of her companions announced their decision to convene a women's congress to advocate for women's political rights. The congress, prepared at Nezihe Muhiddin's residence, took place on June 15, 1923, at the Darülfünun Conference Hall. During the meeting, it was decided to establish a political party named the Women's People Party (Kadınlar Halk Fırkası). The party’s platform was published in the press. Under the leadership of Nezihe Muhiddin, the party completed its organizational framework and submitted its official petition even before the establishment of the Republican People's Party (Cumhuriyet Halk Fırkası), making it the first political party in Republican history. However, eight months later, the petition was rejected. The governorship denied the permit on the grounds that "political representation for women was not possible under the electoral law of 1909." Consequently, the Women's People Party was transformed into an association named the Turkish Women's Union.

== Turkish Women's Union ==
The Turkish Women's Union, with Nezihe Muhiddin among its founders, was officially established on February 7, 1924. The Union's objective was to "elevate womanhood in intellectual and social spheres to reach a modern and mature level," and Nezihe Muhiddin assumed its presidency. In 1925, she founded the journal Türk Kadın Yolu (The Turkish Women’s Way). As the owner and editor-in-chief, she published thirty issues, utilizing the journal as a platform to voice women's political demands.

Despite women's political rights not yet being legally recognized, the Turkish Women's Union nominated Nezihe Muhiddin and Halide Edip as parliamentary candidates in 1925. The goal was to bring the issue to public attention and influence the Grand National Assembly regarding women's suffrage during the elections. However, their candidacies were rejected by the Republican People's Party. At the time, the ongoing Sheikh Said Rebellion served as a pretext for the government to overlook women's political demands.Muhiddin then founded Türk Kadınlar Birliği (Turkish Women's Union) with Latife Bekir, and edited a feminist publication. Türk Kadınlar Birliği continued to press for political equality. In 1927 the Union decided to promote a feminist male candidate to champion women's rights in the parliament, but he was unsuccessful.

She spent her life working to improve the quality of the lives of Turkish women.

Nezihe Muhiddin wrote novels that studied women's problems and criticized men's attitudes in marriages. Her first novel, "Şebâb-ı Tebah” (Disappearing Youth), was published in 1911. Muhiddin started her career at the age of twenty and served many duties. She wrote articles in magazines and newspapers, one of the most important works among them was Kadın Yolu Dergisi between 1925 and 1926. Throughout her life, she wrote 20 novels, 300 stories, play, operettas, screenplays. She translated works of world writers such as Goethe and Edgar Allan Poe.

In 1913, she took part in the establishment of the charity named "Turkish Ladies Protection Association” and also became the secretariat of the association. Moreover, she was one of the founders of the Women's Branch of the “Donanma Cemiyeti” which was established to support the Ottoman navy. However, when she was doing charity work, the main issue on her mind was unity of women and their participation in political life.

Muhiddin, in her work called Turkish Women, states that she learned the notion of femininity from the women she grew up within the same environment and her actions were shaped by feeding on their ideas.

She worked as a Directorate of İttihad ve Terakki Kız Sanayi Mehteb and published many novels and stories. She took important positions in associations, congregation, and communities that were founded by women. In 1927, the Union chose to advance a male contender for parliament, which ended up being ineffective. That very year, Nezihe Muhiddin was accused of debasement as the seat of the Union and had to leave her position. The Turkish Women's Union disbanded in 1935, and it was invited to join the semi-official People's Houses, like many similar autonomous organizations.

Nezihe Muhiddin was threatened, disregarded, and discarded by a series of prosecutions, both by the state authorities and by her female companions. As a result of the intimidation and deletion policies of that period, she did (could) not engage in political activity after the 1930s and focused on her author identity. She wrote many stories and novels.

On February 10, 1958, she died in a mental hospital located in İstanbul.

== Publications ==
=== Books ===
- Şebab-ı Tebah (The Lost Youth)
- Benliğim benimdir (My Ego is Mine)
- Güzellik Kraliçesi (The Beauty Queen)
- Boz Kurt (The Grey Wolf)
- İstanbul'da Bir Landru (A Landru in Istanbul)
- Ateş Böcekleri (Fire Flies)
- Bir Aşk Böyle Bitti (This is How A Love Ended)
- Çıplak Model (The Naked Model)
- İzmir Çocuğu (The Child of Izmir)
- Avare Kadın (Wastrel Woman)
- Bir Yaz Gecesiydi (It Was a Summer Night)
- Çıngıraklı Yılan (The Rattlesnake)
- Kalbim Senindir (My Heart Belongs To You)
- Sabah Oluyor (Turning Out to be Morning)
- Gene Geleceksin (You Will Come Back)
- Sus Kalbim Sus! (Shush, My Heart, Shush!)
- Türk Kadını (Turkish Woman)
