= Women's People Party =

- Leader: Nezihe Muhiddin
- Founded: 1923 (not legalised)
- Newspaper: Türk Kadın Yolu
- Ideology: Feminism

Women's People Party (Turkish: Kadınlar Halk Fırkası) was one of the political party initiatives in Turkey. It was founded before the Republican People's Party under the leadership of Nezihe Muhiddin.

== History ==
When the republic was declared in 1923, Nezihe Muhiddin and thirteen women decided to gather a women's committee for women's rights. The party demanded suffrage for women, based on the argument that women had contributed their share to the victory over the Greek enemy and other occupiers of Anatolia. Mustafa Kemal, however, had planned to use the name ‘People’s Party’ for his own political party and thought women were still not ready for active participation in politics.

After the national struggle, women sped up their actions. As a result of the changing conditions and the accumulation that has come from the Ottoman Empire, both their views on feminism and their activity styles gained a political dimension that confirmed each other. They believe that they have gained the necessary ground to reveal the demands and understandings that they had not expressed until then. The First Wave was the right time to defend the theses of egalitarian feminism, because it was believed that the Republic would come as a regime that could meet the demands of suffragette feminism and that this accumulation was now achieved in society.

Some changes were made in the election laws in the Parliament, but in these changes, women were not given the right to vote or to be elected, on the contrary, it was claimed that women were still not mature enough to enter political life. However, Nezihe Muhiddin and the thirteen activist women were determined to take political rights and started to form public opinion through the press to this end. Women who decided to organize in order to obtain women's rights decided to gather under the women's council and establish a party.

Although the preparations were held in the house of Nezihe Muhiddin, the first meeting of the committee took place in Darülfünun Conference Hall (Istanbul University) on 15 June 1923. In the meeting, a decision was taken to establish a political party named "Women's People Party". The schedule of the party took place in the press at that time. The party, led by Nezihe Muhiddin, completed the works and submitted the petition to found the party even before the Republican People's Party.

When we look at the prominent articles in the KHF's charter, it is seen that they are united around the following issues: women will prove themselves in political, economic and social issues in the country in order to obtain political rights, they will work for women to participate in municipal elections, women will be both at home and at home to contribute to economic life. They will be economical and productive in outdoor life, in this sense, they will try to encourage the use of domestic goods, make the necessary arrangements for the education of women, and support martyred families and children. A striking article in the charter is that women want to do military service in case of war. This request can be interpreted as the aim of emphasizing that during the War of Independence the homeland was defended not only by men but also by women, therefore women do not need to stand back due to their “nature” in this field, and that women can make every contribution to the country. If we look at the Party's statute in general, it can be seen that it is emphasized that women now want to enter all areas of life, and for this, it is necessary to develop themselves further and to take some practices.

Eight months later, governorship refused the request and gave no permission to establish the party on the grounds that "political representation of women was not possible according to the election law of 1909". The reason why the government did not allow it was that KHF's program included women's rights in all aspects, addressed them in a wide area, and the organizing skills and determination of women who would implement this program. In response, the Women 's People Party transformed into an association, the Turkish Women's Union.
