= 7th government of Turkey =

Government of the Republic of Turkey (1931-1935)

The 7th government of Turkey (5 May 1931 – 1 March 1935) was a government in the history of Turkey. It is also called the sixth İnönü government.

== Background ==
Following the elections held on 4 May 1931, the former cabinet led by İsmet İnönü of the Republican People's Party ended. İsmet İnönü founded the new cabinet.

== The government ==
In the list below, the cabinet members who served only a part of the cabinet's lifespan are shown in the column "Notes".

Title	Name	Notes
Prime Minister	İsmet İnönü	
Ministry of Justice	Yusuf Kemal Tengirşenk; Şükrü Saracoğlu	4 May 1931 – 23 May 1933; 23 May 1933 – 1 March 1935
Ministry of National Defense	Zekai Apaydın	
Ministry of the Interior	Şükrü Kaya	
Ministry of Foreign Affairs	Tevfik Rüştü Aras	
Ministry of Finance	Abdülhalik Renda; Fuat Ağralı	4 May 1931 – 3 February 1934; 3 February 1934 – 1 March 1935
Ministry of National Education	Esat Sagay; Reşit Galip; Hikmet Bayur; Zeynel Abidin Özmen	4 May 1931 – 19 September 1932; 10 November 1932 – 13 August 1933; 27 October 1933 – 9 July 1934; 9 July 1934 – 1 March 1935
Ministry of Public Works	Hilmi Uran; Ali Çetinkaya	4 May 1931 – 26 October 1933; 16 February 1934 – 1 March 1935
Ministry of Health and Social Security	Refik Saydam	
Ministry of Agriculture	Muhlis Erkmen	
Ministry of Customs and Monopolies	Ali Rana Tarhan	
Ministry of Economy	Şeref Özkan; Celal Bayar	4 May 1931 – 8 September 1932; 10 November 1932 – 1 March 1935

== Aftermath ==
The government ended after the elections held on 8 February 1935.

Preceded by 6th government of Turkey (İsmet İnönü)	7th Government of Turkey; 4 May 1931 – 1 March 1935	Succeeded by 8th government of Turkey (İsmet İnönü)
