= 10th government of Turkey =

Government of the Republic of Turkey (1938-1939)

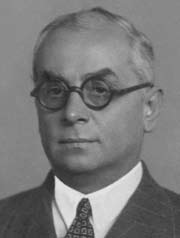
Celal Bayar

The 10th government of Turkey (11 November 1938 – 25 January 1939) was a short-term government in the history of Turkey. It is also called Second Bayar government.

== Background ==
Mustafa Kemal Atatürk, the president and the founder of modern Turkey, died on 10 November. İsmet İnönü was elected as the new president, and consequently the 9th government of Turkey (First Bayar government) resigned. İnönü appointed Celal Bayar of the Republican People's Party (CHP) for the second time. The Second Bayar government was similar to the First Bayar government, but Interior Minister Şükrü Kaya and Foreign Minister Tevfik Rüştü Aras of the previous government were left out of the cabinet, replaced by Refik Saydam and Şükrü Saracoğlu, respectively, both of whom would be the future prime ministers.

== The government ==
In the list below, the cabinet members who served only a part of the cabinet's lifespan are shown in the column "Notes".

Title	Name	Notes
Prime Minister	Celal Bayar	
Ministry of Justice	Hilmi Uran; Tevfik Fikret Sılay	11 November 1938 – 3 January 1939; 3 January 1939 – 25 January 1939
Ministry of National Defense	Kazım Özalp; Naci Tınaz	11 November 1938 – 18 January 1939; 18 January 1939 – 25 January 1939
Ministry of the Interior	Refik Saydam	
Ministry of Foreign Affairs	Şükrü Saracoğlu	
Ministry of Finance	Fuat Ağralı	
Ministry of National Education	Saffet Arıkan; Hasan Ali Yücel	11 November 1938 – 28 December 1938; 28 December 1038 – 25 January 1939
Ministry of Public Works	Ali Çetinkaya	
Ministry of Health and Social Security	Hulusi Alataş	
Ministry of Customs and Monopolies	Ali Rana Tarhan	
Ministry of Economy	Şakir Kesebir; Hüsnü Çakır	11 November 1938 – 28 December 1938; 28 December 1938 – 25 January 1939
Ministry of Agriculture	Faik Kurdoğlu	13 April 1938 – 11 November 1938

== Aftermath ==
Celal Bayar surprisingly resigned on 25 January 1939 with the pretext of the upcoming general elections to be held on 26 March.

Preceded by 9th government of Turkey (Celal Bayar)	10th Government of Turkey; 11 November 1938 – 25 January 1939	Succeeded by 11th government of Turkey (Refik Saydam)
