= 8th government of Turkey =

Government of the Republic of Turkey (1935-1937)

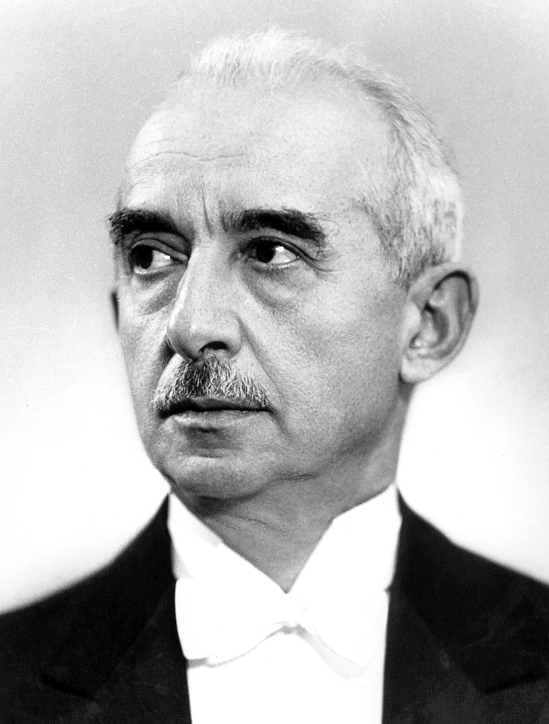
İsmet İnönü

The 8th government of Turkey (1 March 1935 – 1 November 1937) was a government in the history of Turkey. It is also called the seventh İnönü government.

== Background ==
After the elections held on 8 February 1935, İsmet İnönü of the Republican People's Party (CHP) founded his cabinet.

== The government ==
In the list below, the cabinet members who served only a part of the cabinet's lifespan are shown in the column "Notes".

Title	Name	Notes
Prime Minister	İsmet İnönü	
Ministry of Justice	Şükrü Saracoğlu	
Ministry of National Defense	Kazım Özalp	
Ministry of the Interior	Şükrü Kaya	
Ministry of Foreign Affairs	Tevfik Rüştü Aras	
Ministry of Finance	Fuat Ağralı	
Ministry of National Education	Zeynel Abidin Özmen; Saffet Arıkan	1 March 1935 – 16 June 1935; 16 June 1935 – 1 November 1937
Ministry of Public Works	Ali Çetinkaya	
Ministry of Agriculture	Muhlis Erkmen; Şakir Kesebir	1 March 1935 – 11 June 1937; 11 June 1937 – 1 November 1937
Ministry of Customs and Monopolies	Ali Rana Tarhan	
Ministry of Economy	Celal Bayar	

== Aftermath ==
In 1937, there were certain issues on which the president Mustafa Kemal Atatürk and İsmet İnönü disagreed. According to Şevket Süreyya Aydemir, during the Nyon Conference ( 10–14 September 1937) in which Turkey participated, the disagreement around foreign politics became evident. On 25 October, İsmet İnönü resigned, and Celal Bayar, who was the Minister of Economy in İnönü's government, was appointed as the new prime minister by President Atatürk.

Preceded by 7th government of Turkey (İsmet İnönü)	8th Government of Turkey; 1 March 1935 – 1 November 1937	Succeeded by 9th government of Turkey (Celal Bayar)
