= 9th government of Turkey =

Government of the Republic of Turkey (1937-1938)

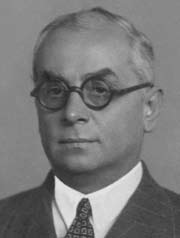
Celal Bayar

The 9th government of Turkey (1 November 1937 – 11 November 1938) was a government in the history of Turkey. It is also called first Bayar government.

== Background ==
The government was formed after İsmet İnönü, the previous prime minister, resigned. It was founded by Celal Bayar of the Republican People's Party (CHP).

== The government ==
In the list below, the cabinet members who served only a part of the cabinet's lifespan are shown in the column "Notes".

Title	Name	Notes
Prime Minister	Celal Bayar	
Ministry of Justice	Şükrü Saracoğlu	
Ministry of National Defense	Kazım Özalp	
Ministry of the Interior	Şükrü Kaya	
Ministry of Foreign Affairs	Tevfik Rüştü Aras	
Ministry of Finance	Fuat Ağralı	
Ministry of National Education	Saffet Arıkan	
Ministry of Public Works	Ali Çetinkaya	
Ministry of Health and Social Security	Hulusi Alataş	
Ministry of Customs and Monopolies	Ali Rana Tarhan	
Ministry of Economy	Şakir Kesebir	Also Ministry of Agriculture until 13 April 1938
Ministry of Agriculture	Faik Kurdoğlu	13 April 1938 – 11 November 1938

== Aftermath ==
On 10 November 1938, the president Mustafa Kemal Atatürk died, and the next day, İsmet İnönü was elected as the new president. According to custom, the government was dismissed, but the next government was also founded by Celal Bayar.

Preceded by 8th government of Turkey (İsmet İnönü)	9th Government of Turkey; 1 November 1937 – 11 November 1938	Succeeded by 10th government of Turkey (Celal Bayar)
