= 11th government of Turkey =

Government of the Republic of Turkey (1939)

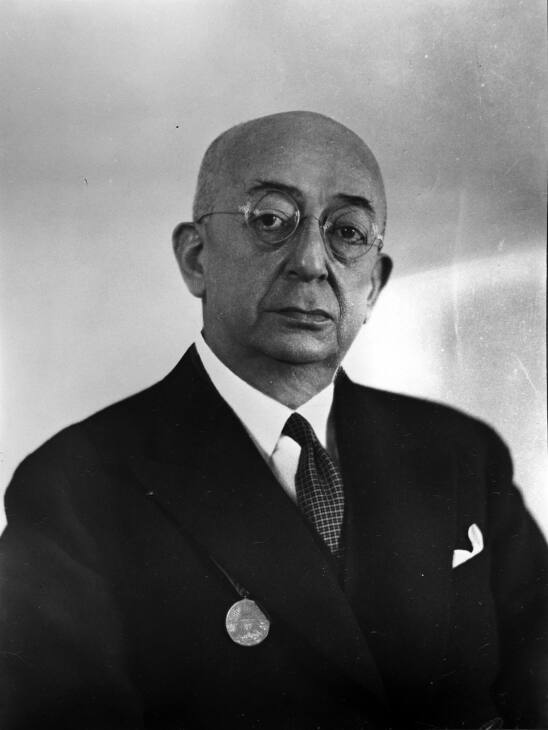
Refik Saydam

The 11th government of Turkey existed for the short term of 25 January 1939 to 3 April 1939. It is also known as the first Saydam cabinet.

== Background ==
The government was formed after Celal Bayar, the prime minister of the previous government, resigned. The new prime minister was Refik Saydam, the secretary general of the Republican People's Party.

== The government ==
Title	Name
Prime Minister	Refik Saydam
Ministry of Justice	Fikret Sılay
Ministry of National Defense	Naci Tınaz
Ministry of the Interior	Faik Öztrak
Ministry of Foreign Affairs	Şükrü Saracoğlu
Ministry of Finance	Fuat Ağralı
Ministry of National Education	Hasan Ali Yücel
Ministry of Public Works	Ali Çetinkaya
Ministry of Health	Hulusi Alataş
Ministry of Customs and Monopolies	Ali Rana Tarhan
Ministry of Economy	Hüsnü Çakır
Ministry of Agriculture and Village Affairs	Muhlis Erkmen

== Aftermath ==
Refik Saydan's cabinet ended because of the general elections held on 26 March. However, the prime minister of the next government was also Refik Saydam.

Preceded by 10th government of Turkey (Celal Bayar)	1st Government of Turkey; 25 January 1939 – 3 April 1939	Succeeded by 12th government of Turkey (Refik Saydam)
