= 6th government of Turkey =

Government of the Republic of Turkey (1930-1931)

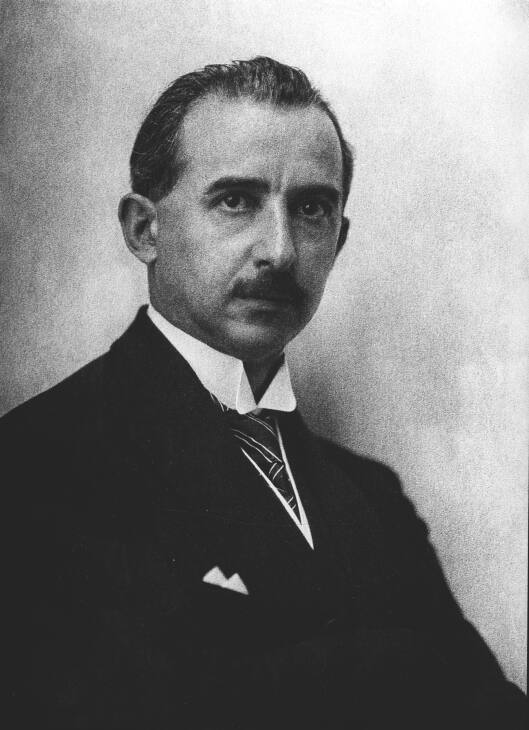
İsmet İnönü in 1920s

The 6th government of Turkey (27 September 1930 – 5 May 1931) was a short lived government in the history of Turkey. It was the fifth İnönü government.

== Background ==
After the formation of an opposition party in the parliament (Liberal Republican Party, Turkish: Serbest Parti), prime minister İsmet İnönü of the Republican People's Party (CHP) decided to renew his cabinet.

== The government ==
In the list below, the cabinet members who served only a part of the cabinet's lifespan are shown in the column "Notes".

Title	Name	Notes
Prime Minister	İsmet İnönü	
Ministry of Justice	Yusuf Kemal Tengirşenk	
Ministry of National Defense	Abdülhalik Renda; Zekai Apaydın	27 September 1930 – 29 December 1930; 29 December 1930 – 4 May 1931
Ministry of the Interior	Şükrü Kaya	
Ministry of Foreign Affairs	Tevfik Rüştü Aras	
Ministry of Finance	Şükrü Saracoğlu; Abdülhalik Renda	27 September 1930 – 25 December 1930; 25 December 1930 – 4 May 1931
Ministry of National Education	Esat Sagay	
Ministry of Public Works	Zekai Apaydın; Hilmi Uran	27 September 1930 – 29 December 1930; 29 December 1930 – 4 May 1931
Ministry of Health and Social Security	Refik Saydam	
Ministry of Economy	Şeref Özkan	

In 1930-1931, surnames were not yet in use in Turkey, which would remain true until the Surname Law. The surnames given in the list are the surnames the members of the cabinet assumed after 1934.

== Aftermath ==
Following the elections held on 4 May 1931, İnönü resigned, but also founded the next government.

Preceded by 5th government of Turkey (İsmet İnönü)	6th Government of Turkey; 27 September 1930 – 4 May 1931	Succeeded by 7th government of Turkey (İsmet İnönü)
