= Independent Group (Turkey) =

Opposition bloc in Turkish National Assembly from 1939 to 1946

Independent Group (Turkish: Müstakil Grup) was an opposition group in the Turkish parliament between 1939 and 1946.

== Backgrounds ==
After the Turkish Republic was proclaimed in 1923 by Atatürk and members of the Republican People's Party (CHP), the CHP became the ruling party up to 1950. This was a one-party regime. During this period two times an opposition party was founded; the Progressive Republican Party (TCF) in 1924 and the Liberal Republican Party (SCF) in 1930. But in both cases the opposition party was short-lived.

== The group ==
After İsmet İnönü became the president in 1938 he proposed another system for opposition. Probably this was due to İsmet İnönü's desire to take part on the side of western countries and to show democratization efforts in domestic policy.

During the general congress of CHP held on 29 May 1939, party by-law was amended to form an independent group within the parliament. According to the amendment, the chairman of the group was the president. But he was represented by a vice chairman. The 21 group members were appointed by the president from the CHP MPs. But in 1943 the number of Independent group members was raised to 35. These members had the right to attend the CHP caucus. But they had no right to speak and vote in the party. They were independent of party decisions and unlike the other party members had the right to oppose the government proposals in the parliament.

The vice chairman of the group was Ali Rana Tarhan, a former Minister of Customs and Monopolies in the six governments of Turkey (From 7th to 12th government of Turkey. (5 May 1931 – 26 May 1939))

The independent group practice aimed to fulfil the need for an opposition. However the group members were the CHP members and their number was only 5%-8% of that of the parliament. Besides, their term coincided with the World War II . Thus their opposition activities fell short of the expectations. Their critics in the parliament were put on the record and sometimes published in the newspapers; but these were not effective on the policy of the government.

== Aftermath ==
In 1946 Democrat Party (DP) was founded as a genuine opposition party and the Independent group became obsolete. In the general congress of the party the group was abolished. In 1950 elections DP defeated CHP.

== See also ==
- One-party period of the Republic of Turkey
