= Ali Rana Tarhan =

Turkish politician

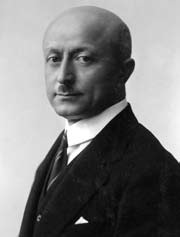
- Ali Rana Tarhan in the 1930s

Minister of Customs and Trade
- In office March 1, 1935 – May 26, 1939
- Prime Minister: İsmet İnönü, Celal Bayar, Refik Saydam, Şükrü Saracoğlu
- Preceded by: (Established)
- Succeeded by: Raif karadeniz

Personal details
- Born: 1883 Constantinople, Ottoman Empire
- Died: 25 March 1956 (aged 72–73) Istanbul, Turkey
- Party: Republican People's Party – Democrat Party
- Education: Galatasaray High School

Ali Rana Tarhan (1883 – 25 March 1956) was a Turkish politician, and a member of the Republican People's Party.

== Biography ==
Ali Rana Tarhan was born in Istanbul in 1883. After graduating from Galatasaray High School, he travelled to Belgium and Germany to study communication (then known as PTT-profession). He joined the Republican People's Party (CHP) and, in 1927 he was elected as an MP. In the 7th, 8th, 9th, 10th, 11th and 12th government of Turkey he was always the Minister of Customs and Trade between 1 March 1935– 26 May 1939. In 1939, he joined a group of MP s in the party to form a semi independent political group in the party which would act as an opposition. He was the acting speaker of the group. Thus he left his seat in the cabinet. After his party lost the elections in 1950 he served in the board of directors of İşbank.

He died in Istanbul on March 25, 1956, and was buried the next day in the family grave at the Küplüce Cemetery in Beylerbeyi.
