= Hilmi Uran =

Turkish politician

Mustafa Hilmi Uran
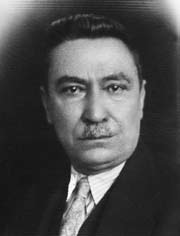

Minister of Internal Affairs of Turkey
- In office 20 May 1943 – 7 August 1946
- Prime Minister: Şükrü Saracoğlu
- Preceded by: Recep Peker
- Succeeded by: Şükrü Sökmensüer

Minister of Justice of Turkey
- In office 11 November 1938 – 3 January 1939
- Prime Minister: Celâl Bayar
- Preceded by: Şükrü Saracoğlu
- Succeeded by: Tevfik Fikret Sılay

Turkish Minister of Public Works
- In office 29 December 1930 – 26 October 1933
- Prime Minister: Ismet Inonu
- Preceded by: Zekai Apaydın
- Succeeded by: Fuat Ağralı

Personal details
- Born: 1886 Bodrum, Ottoman Empire
- Died: 21 October 1957 (aged 71) Ankara, Turkey

Hilmi Uran (1886–1957) was a former Turkish politician and government minister.

== Life ==
He was born in Bodrum, (now an ilçe of Muğla Province) in 1884. After graduating from the Faculty of Political Sciences, during the last years of the Ottoman Empire, he was appointed as the kaymakam (second level governor) of Menemen and Çeşme, both in İzmir Province. He also represented Menteshe (Muğla Province) in the Ottoman parliament. After the proclamation the Turkish Republic, he represented Seyhan of Adana Province in the Turkish parliament between 1927 and 1950. He died on 21 October 1957.

== In the government ==
Between 29 December 1930 and 26 October 1933, he served as the Minister of Public Works in the 6th and 7th government of Turkey. Between 11 November 1938 and 3 January 1939, he was the Minister of Justice in the 10th government of Turkey. From 26 May 1943 to 7 August 1946, he served as the Minister of Interior in the 14th government of Turkey.

== In the party ==
He was also active in the Republican People's Party (CHP). In 1947, during the early years of the multi-party regime, he supported the moderate wing in CHP, and he was elected as the deputy of the party chairman İsmet İnönü. After the defeat of his party in the general election 1950, he wrote his memoirs, which were published in 2008, long after his death, under title Meşrutiyet, tek parti, çok parti hatıralarım, 1908–1950: anı ("My memories of Constitutional Monarchy, One Party Regime and Multi Party Regime 1908–1950: Memoir").
