= Umurbey =

Umurbey can refer to:

- Umurbey Dam
- Umurbey, Enez
- Umurbey, Gemlik
