= 12th government of Turkey =

Government of the Republic of Turkey (1939-1942)

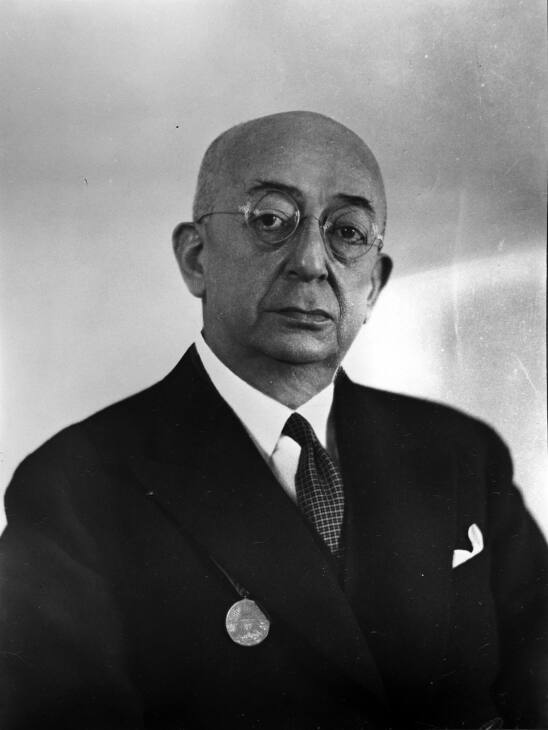
Refik Saydam in 1939

The 12th government of Turkey (3 April 1939 – 9 July 1942) governed Turkey during the early years of the Second World War. It is also known as the second Saydam government.

== Background ==
The government was formed after the general elections held on 26 March. The prime minister was Refik Saydam, secretary general of the Republican People's Party. He was also the prime minister of the previous caretaker government.

== The government ==
In the list below, the cabinet members who served only a part of the cabinet's lifespan are shown in the column "Notes".

Title	Name	Notes
Prime Minister	Refik Saydam	
Ministry of Justice	Fikret Sılay; Fethi Okyar; Sayfettin Menemencioğlu	3 April 1939 – 26 May 1939; 26 May 1939 – 12 March 1941; 12 March 1941 – 9 July 1942
Ministry of National Defense	Naci Tınaz; Saffet Arıkan; Ali Rıza Artunkal	3 April 1939 – 5 April 1940; 5 April 1940 – 12 November 1941; 12 November 1941 – 9 July 1942
Ministry of the Interior	Faik Öztrak; Ahmet Fikri Tüzer	3 April 1939 – 6 May 1942; 6 May 1942 – 9 July 1942
Ministry of Foreign Affairs	Şükrü Saracoğlu	
Ministry of Finance	Fuat Ağralı	
Ministry of National Education	Hasan Ali Yücel	
Ministry of Public Works	Ali Fuat Cebesoy	
Ministry of Health	Hulusi Alataş	
Ministry of Customs and Monopolies	Ali Rana Tarhan; Raif Karadeniz	3 April 1939 – 26 May 1939; 26 May 1939 – 9 July 1942
Ministry of Transport	Ali Çetinkaya; Cevat Kerim İncedayı; Fahri Engin	3 April 1939 – 20 November 1940; 20 November 1940 – 12 November 1941; 12 November 1941 – 9 July 1942
Ministry of Economy	Hüsnü Çakır; Sırrı Day	3 April 1939 – 31 July 1941; 31 July 1941 – 9 July 1942
Ministry of Commerce	Cezmi Erçin; Nazmi Topçuoğlu; Mümtaz Ökmen	3 April 1939 – 1 November 1939; 1 November 1939 – 26 November 1940; 26 November 1940 – 9 July 1942
Ministry of Agriculture	Muhlis Erkmen	

== Aftermath ==
Refik Saydam died on 7 July 1942. He is the only prime minister in the history of Turkey who has died while serving as the prime minister. Ahmet Fikri Tüzer served as the acting prime minister for two days, and another cabinet was formed by Şükrü Saracoğlu on 9 July.

Preceded by 11th government of Turkey (Refik Saydam)	12th Government of Turkey; 3 April 1939 – 9 July 1942	Succeeded by 13th government of Turkey (Şükrü Saracoğlu)
