= Cevdet Kerim İncedayı =

Ottoman-born Turkish army officer, politician and author

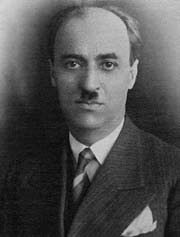

2nd Minister of Transport
- In office 20 November 1940 – 12 November 1941
- President: İsmet İnönü
- Prime Minister: Refik Saydam
- Preceded by: Ali Çetinkaya
- Succeeded by: Mehmet Fahri Engin

13th Minister of Public Works
- In office 7 August 1946 – 10 September 1947
- President: İsmet İnönü
- Prime Minister: Recep Peker
- Preceded by: Sırrı Day
- Succeeded by: Kasım Gülek

Member of the Grand National Assembly
- In office 8 February 1935 – 19 May 1951
- Constituency: Sinop (1935, 1939, 1943, 1946, 1950)

Personal details
- Born: 1893 Sinop, Kastamonu Vilayet, Ottoman Empire
- Died: 19 May 1951 (aged 57–58) Istanbul, Turkey
- Party: Republican People's Party
- Education: Gülhane Military Medical Academy

Military service
- Allegiance: Ottoman Empire (1914–1919); Turkey (1919–1925)
- Branch/service: Ottoman Army; Turkish Army
- Rank: Major
- Unit: 7th Division
- Battles/wars: World War I Greco-Turkish War

Cevdet Kerim İncedayı (1893 – 19 May 1951) was an Ottoman-born Turkish army officer, politician and author.

== Biography ==
Born in 1893 in Sinop, he studied at the Gülhane Military Medical Academy and graduated in 1914. He was sent to the Caucasus front during World War I. After the war, he joined the Turkish nationalist movement in Ankara and took part in the Greco-Turkish War as part of the 7th Division. He stopped the Greek advance at the Battle of Sakarya. After the war, he retired from the army at the rank of Major and started a career in politics shortly after.

He was elected a member of the Grand National Assembly in 1935, from Sinop, and would serve for 16 years until his death in 1951. In November 1940, he became the 2nd Minister of Transport and held that office until November 1941. 5 years later, in August 1946, he served as the Minister of Public Works until September 1947.

During his lifetime, he wrote two books about the Turkish War of Independence:

- Türk İstiklâl Harbi Garp Cephesi (1926)
- İnkılâp ve İstiklâl (1936)

== See also ==
- List of members of the Grand National Assembly of Turkey who died in office
