= Faruk Özlü =

Turkish politician (born 1962)

Faruk Özlü MP
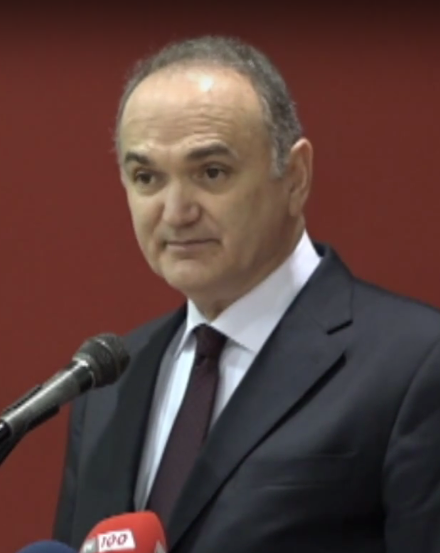

Minister of Science, Industry and Technology
- In office 24 May 2016 – 10 July 2018
- Prime Minister: Binali Yıldırım
- Preceded by: Fikri Işık
- Succeeded by: Mustafa Varank

Member of the Grand National Assembly
- In office 26 June 2015 – 24 June 2018
- Constituency: Düzce (June 2015, Nov 2015)

Personal details
- Born: 19 November 1962 (age 63) Düzce, Turkey
- Party: Justice and Development Party
- Children: 2
- Education: Yıldız Technical University; Istanbul Technical University
- Profession: Politician
- Cabinet: 65th
- Website: Personal website

Faruk Özlü (born 19 November 1962) is a Turkish politician from the Justice and Development Party (AK Party) who served as the Minister of Science, Industry and Technology of Turkey from 24 May 2016 to 10 July 2018. He was a Member of Parliament for the electoral district of Düzce, having been first elected in the June 2015 general election and re-elected in the November 2015 general election.

== Early life and career ==
=== Education ===
Faruk Özlü was born on 19 November 1962 in Düzce and studied at Düzce High School before graduating from the Yıldız Technical University (YTÜ) as a mechanical engineer. He obtained a master's degree and a doctorate from Istanbul Technical University (İTÜ). He obtained further education regarding projects and engineering in Spain, before taking a senior management course at Harvard University.

=== Early career and civil service ===
In 1987, Özlü returned to YTÜ as a researcher. In 1990, he joined the Defence Industry Undersecretariat as an engineer. He later became an expert, project manager, department manager and assistant secretary. He also briefly served as the acting undersecretary. While working at the Undersecretariat, Özlü oversaw projects such as Turkey's first domestically produced tank ALTAY, the country's first unmanned spacecraft ANKA, its first domestically produced warship MİLGEM. He also worked on the development of the Airbus A400M Atlas military transport aircraft, the F-35 and F-16 fighter jets, helicopter electronic warfare systems, the M60 tank modernisation, long range air and missile defense systems, coding and simulation.

He has served on the executive boards of Turkish Aerospace Industries (TAI-TUŞAŞ), Airport Operations and Aviation Industries (HEAŞ), Teknopark İstanbul and Defence Technologies Engineering and Commerce (STM).

== Minister of science, industry and technology ==
Özlü joined the Justice and Development Party (AK Party) and was elected as a Member of Parliament for the electoral district of Düzce in the June 2015 general election. He was re-elected in the November 2015 general election. Following the resignation of Ahmet Davutoğlu as Prime Minister in May 2016, the AK Party held an Extraordinary Congress on 22 May to determine his successor. Binali Yıldırım was elected as party leader unopposed and formed his cabinet on 24 May, appointing Özlü as the Minister of Science, Industry and Technology.

== See also ==
- Aviation in Turkey
- Turkish Air Force

Political offices
Preceded by Fikri Işık	Minister of Science, Industry and Technology; 24 May 2016 – 10 July 2018	Succeeded by Mustafa Varank
