= Fuat Ağralı =

Turkish politician

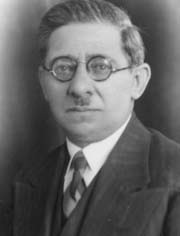
- Fuat Ağralı in the 1930s

Ministry of Finance
- In office 3 February 1934 – 13 September 1944
- Prime Minister: İsmet İnönü; Celal Bayar; Refik Saydam; Şükrü Saracoğlu
- Preceded by: Abdülhalik Renda
- Succeeded by: Nazmi Keşmir

Personal details
- Born: 1877 Agra, Lesbos, Ottoman Empire
- Died: 11 May 1957 (aged 79–80) İzmir, Turkey
- Occupation: Politician
- Profession: Financier

Ali Fuat Ağralı (1877 – 11 May 1957) was a Turkish politician.

== Early years ==
He was born in 1877 in Agra village of the Greek island Lesbos, then a part of the Ottoman Empire (whence he later adopted his surname, Ağralı, "of Agra"). He graduated from the Faculty of Political Sciences in 1903 and the Faculty of Law in 1908 both in Constantinople.

During his early years he translated an Arabic book to Turkish and he was praised by Ahmet Mithat, an important Ottoman journalist.

== Politics ==
During the Turkish War of Independence, he joined the nationalist forces. During the Lausanne Conference (1922–1923), he was a member of the Turkish delegation. He served as the accountant of the delegation. During the Republican age, he was elected Republican People's Party (CHP) deputy from Istanbul (1923–1933) and Elazığ Provinces (1933–1950). On 3 February 1934 he was appointed as the Minister of Finance in the 7th government of Turkey. He kept this post in the 8th, 9th, 10th, 11th, 12th, 13th and the 14th government of Turkey up to 13 September 1944.

== Later years ==
After the ministral years he continued as a CHP MP in the parliament up to 1950 when CHP was defeated in the elections. He died on 11 May 1957 in İzmir.
