= Muhlis Erkmen =

Turkish politician

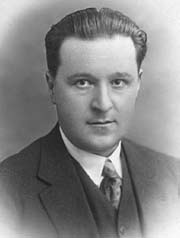

Member of the Grand National Assembly

Personal details
- Born: 1891 Bursa, Ottoman Empire
- Died: 27 June 1985 (aged 93–94) Istanbul, Turkey

Muhlis Erkmen (1891 in Bursa – 27 June 1985 in Istanbul) was a Turkish farmer and politician.

== Biography ==
He graduated from the Halkalı High School of Agriculture in İstanbul and specialized in animal breeding and dairy farming in Berlin, Germany. He played a pioneering role in the establishment of the Ankara School of Agriculture and the Atatürk Forest Farm and Zoo. Mustafa Kemal Atatürk personally gave him the surname "Erkmen".

In the summer of 1985, he died in his house in Istanbul.

Muhlis Erkmen was the minister of agriculture between 5 March 1931 and 11 June 1937 (7th and 8th government of Turkey) during İsmet İnönü's governments and between 25 January and 9 July 1942 (11th and 12th government of Turkey) during Refik Saydam's governments.

Political offices
Preceded by Newly established	Minister of agriculture 5 March 1931 – 11 June 1937	Succeeded by Şakir Kesebir
Preceded by Faik Kurdoğlu	Minister of agriculture 25 January 1939 – 9 July 1942	Succeeded by Raşit Şevket Hatiboğlu
