= Hasan Bitmez =

Turkish politician (1969–2023)

Member of the Grand National Assembly of Turkey
- In office 2 June 2023 – 14 December 2023
- Constituency: Kocaeli (2023)

Personal details
- Born: 15 December 1969 Alucra, Giresun, Turkey
- Died: 14 December 2023 (aged 53) Ankara, Turkey
- Resting place: Merkezefendi Cemetery
- Party: Felicity Party
- Children: 1
- Education: Al-Azhar University

Hasan Bitmez (15 December 1969 – 14 December 2023) was a Turkish politician who was a member of the Grand National Assembly of Turkey for the Felicity Party.

== Early life ==
Born in the town of Alucra on 15 December 1969, Bitmez attended Gebze Imam-Hatip High School in Istanbul, and went to college at Al-Azhar University.

== Family ==
He was married and had one child.

== Death ==
On 12 December 2023, Bitmez collapsed from a heart attack in parliament, moments after finishing a speech denouncing Israel in the context of the Gaza genocide, saying that Israel "will suffer the wrath of Allah," and criticizing the ongoing relationship between Turkey's ruling Justice and Development Party (AKP) and Israel. As he collapsed, it was reported that one or more AKP members of parliament chanted "this is the wrath of Allah". He died at Ankara Bilkent City Hospital two days later, on 14 December, one day before his 54th birthday. He was buried at Merkezefendi Cemetery in Istanbul.

Bitmez is the fourth MP in the history of Turkey to have died during or after an event that took place in the Assembly, following Halid Karsıalan, Mehmet Abdurrezak Ceylan, and Mehmet Fevzi Şıhanlıoğlu. Following his death, the Felicity and Future Alliance failed to maintain the 20-deputy quota to unify, and it subsequently fell apart. However, CHP Kütahya MP Ali Fazıl Kasap switched parties and refounded the group until the group dissolved to create New Path.

== See also ==
- List of members of the Grand National Assembly of Turkey who died in office
