= İmran Kılıç =

Turkish politician (died 2021)

İmran Kılıç (1957 – 18 November 2021) was a Turkish politician who served as a member of the Grand National Assembly of Turkey from 2015 till his death in 2021 from COVID-19 in Ankara during the COVID-19 pandemic in Turkey.

== See also ==
- List of members of the Grand National Assembly of Turkey who died in office
