= Mehmet Fatih Kacır =

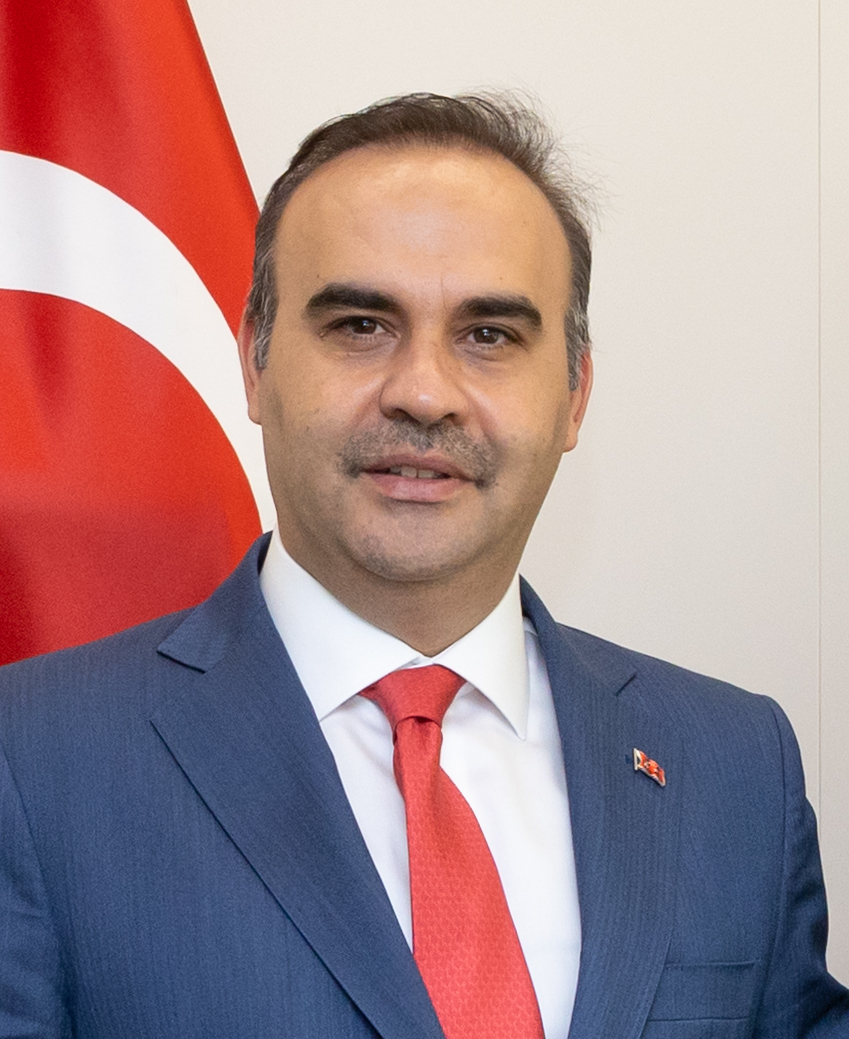
- Kacır in 2025

Minister of Industry and Technology
- Incumbent
- Assumed office 4 June 2023
- President: Recep Tayyip Erdoğan
- Preceded by: Mustafa Varank

Personal details
- Born: 16 October 1984 (age 41) Istanbul, Turkey
- Education: Istanbul High School
- Alma mater: Boğaziçi University (BS)
- Website: mehmetfatihkacir.com

Mehmet Fatih Kacır (born 16 October 1984) is a Turkish politician and entrepreneur. He has been serving as the Deputy Minister of Industry and Technology since July 31, 2018. On 3 June 2023, he took part in the new cabinet announced by President Recep Tayyip Erdoğan and became the new Minister of Industry and Technology.

== Early life and education ==
He completed his secondary education at Istanbul High School. In 2003, he ranked 12th in the national university entrance exam and entered Boğaziçi University, Department of Industrial Engineering. He completed his studies in 2008. During university years, he was a student representative. He pioneered interdisciplinary research and project management trainings.

== Career ==
After graduating from the university, he worked as a manager in the companies he founded in the food and technology sectors. He developed industrial designs and utility models. He worked on 3D simulation movies, simulation software and hardware, augmented reality, and virtual reality applications.

== Roles at civil society ==
Kacır was among the founders of the T3 Foundation established in 2016 and served as the chairman of the board of directors until 2018. In the foundation, he pioneered in projects such as "Future Technology Stars Program" for kids with special skills, "Deneyap Technology Workshops", and "Teknofest." In 2018, he served as a member of the Science Board at TÜBİTAK (The Scientific and Technological Research Council of Turkey).

== TEKNOFEST ==
Kacır is among the founders of the Teknofest, the largest aerospace, and technology festival of Turkey, launched in 2018. He serves as the chairman of executive board of the Teknofest.

== Deputy Secretary of Ministry of Industry and Technology ==
Kacır was appointed as the Deputy Minister of Industry and Technology on July 31, 2018, and served as responsible for the ministry's National Technology Initiative and strategic transformation policies. As part of this role, he coordinated the works of the General Directorate of National Technology, the General Directorate of Strategic Research and Productivity, TÜBİTAK, the Turkish Patent and Trademark Office, the Turkish Academy of Sciences and the Turkish Space Agency.

During his tenure as the Deputy Minister; he has been the Chairman of the Steering Committee of the DENEYAP Türkiye Technology Workshop Project, the Chairman of the Program Committee of the Technology-Oriented Industry Move Program, which is an R&D and Investment Incentive Program for high-tech products and innovative technologies, the Chairman of the Committee for Monitoring and Competence Evaluation of Research Infrastructures and the Chairman of the National Technology Entrepreneurship Council.

Kacır also led the establishment of the Turkey Open Source Platform and the 42 Software Schools within this platform. He worked on creating and implementing a technology roadmap for Togg, a Turkish automotive manufacturer.

On April 26, 2019, he was appointed as a board member of ASELSAN. Additionally, Kacır serves as a board member of The Prof. Dr. Fuat Sezgin Research Foundation for the History of Science in Islam, which aims to preserve the scientific and technological heritage of Islamic culture and civilization.
