= Reşide Bayar =

First Lady of Turkey
- In role 22 May 1950 – 27 May 1960
- President: Celal Bayar
- Preceded by: Mevhibe İnönü
- Succeeded by: Melahat Gürsel

Personal details
- Born: 1887 Bursa, Ottoman Empire
- Died: 24 December 1962 (aged 74–75) Ankara, Turkey
- Resting place: Cebeci Asri Cemetery, Ankara
- Spouse: Celal Bayar (m. 1903)
- Children: 3, including Nilüfer Bayar

Reşide Bayar (1887 – 24 December 1962) was the 3rd First Lady of Turkey. She was the wife of Celal Bayar, the 3rd President of Turkey, until her death on 24 December 1962. While on a train from Istanbul to Ankara she died of a heart attack.

By her husband she had three children, two sons, Refii and Turgut, and a daughter, Nilüfer.

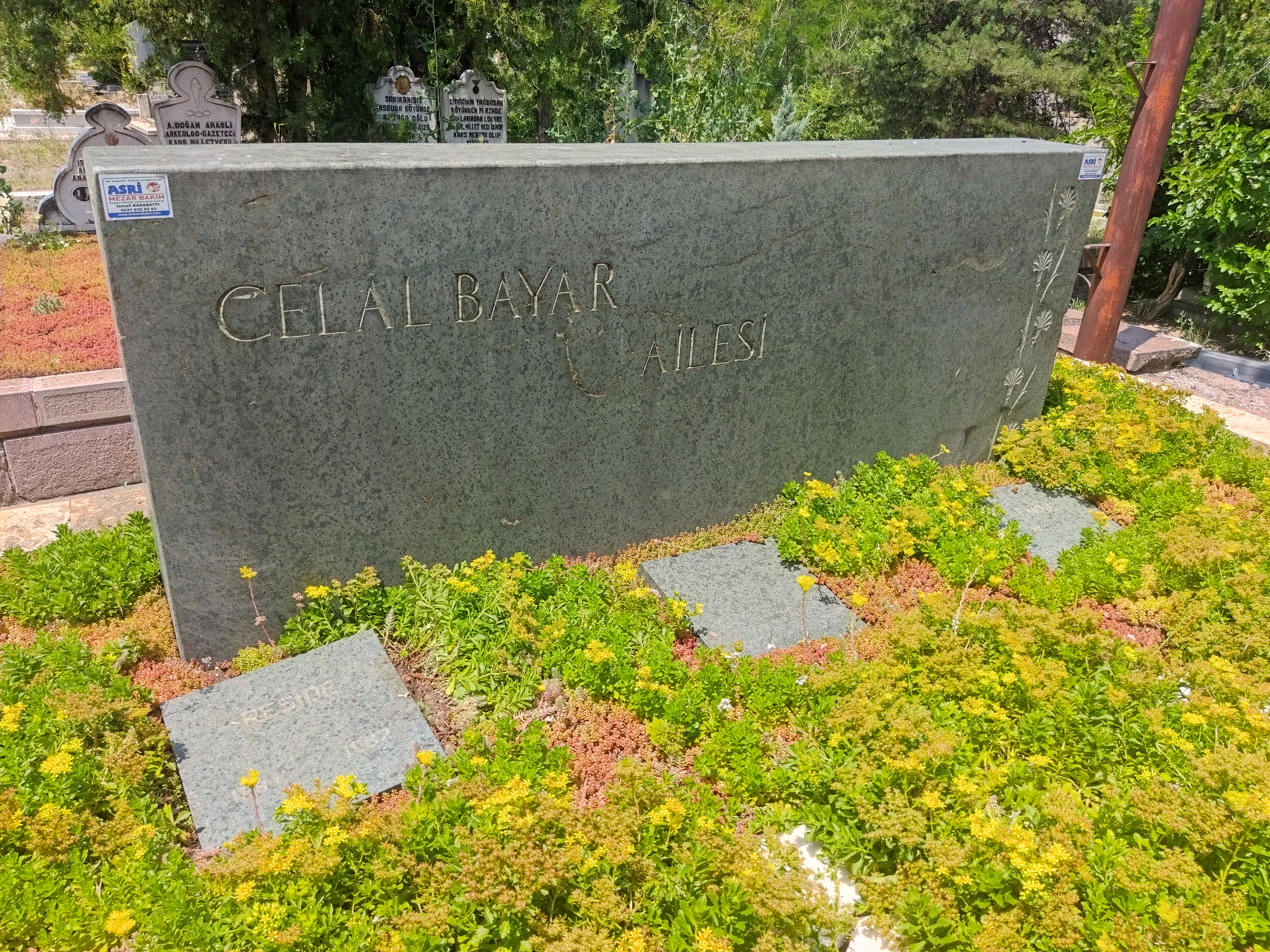
Grave of Reşide Bayar in Cebeci Asri Cemetery, Ankara
