= List of members of the Grand National Assembly of Turkey who died in office =

List of Turkish MPs who died in office

The following is a list of members of the Grand National Assembly of Turkey who died in office since its establishment in 1920.

== List ==
Member	Party	Constituency	Date of death	Age at death (years)	Cause
Mahmut Nedim Hendek	N/A	Muğla	21 April 1920	40	Killed during the Hendek Rebellion
İzzet Eyyüboğlu	N/A	Trabzon	6 May 1920	57–58	Killed by bandits
Ziya Tuğlu	N/A	Gümüşhane	6 May 1920	31–32	Killed
Ahmet Cemalettin Çelebi	N/A	Kırşehir	1921	58–59	Illness
Ali Şükrü Bey	N/A	Trabzon	27 March 1923	38–39	Assassinated
Halit Karsıalan	N/A	Ardahan	14 February 1925	41–42	Shot during a parliamentary brawl
İsmail Hakkı Çevik	DP	Eskişehir	12 June 1950	67–68	
Mahir Türkay	DP	Sivas	29 August 1950	33–34	
Raşit Gürgen	DP	Gümüşhane	14 September 1950	57–58	
Cevdet Kerim İncedayı	CHP	Sinop	19 May 1951	57–58	Liver disease
Muhtar Ertan	CHP	Bitlis	30 June 1951	38–39	
Tevfik Koral	CHP	Trabzon	28 July 1951	43–44	
Hüsnü Akşit	DP	Denizli	18 September 1951	35–36	
Şefik Tugay	CHP	Malatya	3 November 1951	45–46	
Ziya Barlas	DP	Konya	8 March 1952	42–43	
Tahsin Coşkan	DP	Kastamonu	13 March 1952	62	
Nuri Turgut Topçuoğlu	DP	Tokat	4 June 1952	54–55	
Fikret Karabudak	DP	Denizli	8 October 1952	58–59	
Hacı Ömer Cevheri	DP	Şanlıurfa	18 November 1952	64–65	
Yusuf Kâmil Aktuğ	DP	Diyarbakır	5 December 1952	68–69	
Yusuf Ziya Tuntaş	DP	Tekirdağ	15 February 1953	61–62	
Halil Ayan	DP	Bursa	15 February 1953	48–49	
Cevdet Topçu	DP	Amasya	15 June 1953	38–39	
Reşat Şemsettin Sirer	CHP	Sivas	2 October 1953	49–50	Road accident
Galip Deniz	DP	Kastamonu	6 October 1953	49–50	
Senihi Yürüten	DP	Istanbul	20 February 1954	59–60	
Remzi Oğuz Arık	DP	Adana	3 April 1954	59–60	Plane crash
Salamon Adato	DP	Istanbul	3 April 1954	59–60	Plane crash (same event with Remzi Oğuz Arık)
Budak Mursaloğlu	CHP	Hatay	12 October 1965	39	
Atıf Akın	AP	Manisa	29 November 1977	51–52	
Mutlu Menderes	AP	Aydın	1 March 1978	40–41	Struck by a car
Mehmet İlhami Ertem	AP	Edirne	4 April 1978	60	
Hasan Fehmi İlter	CHP	Muğla	4 June 1978	49–50	
Mustafa Kubilây İmer	AP	Konya	12 June 1979	50–51	
Ahmet Hamdi Çelebi	CHP	Ankara	24 August 1979	52–53	
Durmuş Ali Çalık	CHP	Konya	19 September 1979	36	Road accident
Mehmet Emin Dalkıran	AP	Bursa	22 December 1979	53–54	Heart attack
Malik Yılman	CHP	Hatay	15 April 1980	44–45	
Ahmet Hamdi Sancar	AP	Denizli	5 July 1980	64	
Abdurrahman Köksaloğlu	CHP	Istanbul	15 July 1980	49–50	Assassinated
Mucip Ataklı	HP	Istanbul	19 November 1984	65	
Mahmut Akkılıç	HP	İzmir	6 January 1985	57–58	
Emin Alpkaya	MDP	Niğde	22 March 1985	66	
Ahmet Kemal Aydar	HP	Ankara	25 November 1985	60–61	
Sinan Fevzi Fırat	MDP	Zonguldak	8 April 1986	61–62	
Mahmut Kepolu	ANAP	Diyarbakır	28 April 1988	64–65	
Mithat Balak	ANAP	Çorum	8 September 1988	41–42	
Mehmet Abdurrezak Ceylan	DYP	Siirt	29 March 1989	38	Accidentally shot during a parliamentary brawl
Zekeriya Bahçeci	DYP	Antalya	8 February 1990	43–44	
Mehmet Aydın	ANAP	Samsun	26 May 1990	62	Road accident
Kamran Karaman	ANAP	Hatay	4 June 1990	61–62	
Arif Ağaoğlu	ANAP	Adıyaman	28 June 1990	51–52	Heart attack
Zeynel Aslan	ANAP	Adıyaman	2 July 1990	42–43	
Mehmet Özalp	ANAP	Aydın	9 November 1990	40–41	Road accident
Mümin Gençoğlu	ANAP	Bursa	7 February 1993	60	Road accident
Yılmaz Hocaoğlu	ANAP	Adana	8 August 1993	51–52	Road accident
Abdülkadir Cenkçiler	DYP	Bursa	8 April 1997	50	
Şerif Çim	DYP	Bilecik	20 September 1998	33	Road accident
Kadir Görmez	MHP	Kütahya	8 September 1999		Road accident
Avni Akyol	ANAP	Bolu	30 September 1999	68	Heart attack
Bedri İncetahtacı	FP	Gaziantep	21 November 1999	39	Road accident
Sıtkı Turan	MHP	Çanakkale	12 December 1999	57–58	Road accident
Nizamettin Sevgili	ANAP	Siirt	15 March 2000	54	Heart attack
Abdullah Turan Bilge	DSP	Konya	29 January 2001	52	Brain tumour
Mehmet Fevzi Şıhanlıoğlu	DYP	Şanlıurfa	30 January 2001	56	Heart attack following a parliamentary brawl
Ali Rıza Septioğlu	DYP	Elazığ	3 September 2001	88	Heart failure
Namık Kemal Atahan	DSP	Hatay	10 November 2001	54–55	Brain hemorrhage
İsmail Aydınlı	DSP	Istanbul	30 April 2002	52	Cirrhosis
Ahmet Derin	SAADET	Kütahya	26 July 2002	52	
Nezir Büyükcengiz	CHP	Konya	3 January 2007	55–56	Road accident
Mehmet Cihat Özönder	MHP	Istanbul	26 July 2007	59	Road accident
Harun Çakır	AK Party	Ordu	28 October 2011	57	Heart attack
Şerafettin Elçi	Independent	Diyarbakır	25 December 2012	74	Heart attack
Ferit Mevlüt Aslanoğlu	CHP	Istanbul	16 May 2014	52	Heart attack
Murat Bozlak	HDP	Adana	4 January 2015	52	
Abdulkadir Yüksel	AK Party	Gaziantep	25 September 2017	55	Heart attack
Erdin Bircan	CHP	Edirne	18 November 2018	59	Brain hemorrhage
Kazım Arslan	CHP	Denizli	7 June 2019	65	
Markar Esayan	AK Party	Istanbul	16 October 2020	51	Stomach cancer
İsmet Uçma	AK Party	Istanbul	11 October 2021	66	
İmran Kılıç	AK Party	Kahramanmaraş	18 November 2021	64	COVID-19
Yakup Taş	AK Party	Adıyaman	7 February 2023	63	Earthquake
Deniz Baykal	CHP	Antalya	11 February 2023	84	
Hasan Bitmez	SAADET	Kocaeli	14 December 2023	53	Heart attack
Sırrı Süreyya Önder	DEM	Istanbul	3 May 2025	62	Multiple organ failure caused by a heart attack
