= Mahmut Nedim Hendek =

Officer of the Ottoman Army

Mahmut Nedim Hendek 1316-Sv. 484
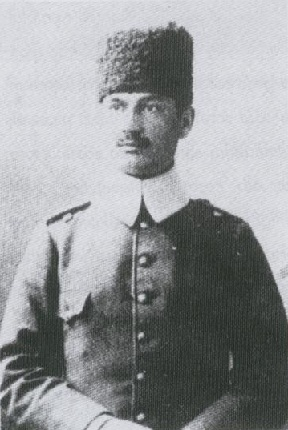
- Born: 1880; Caucasus, Russian Empire
- Died: 21 April 1920 (aged 39–40); Hendek, Turkey
- Burial place: Hendek; State Cemetery
- Military career
- Allegiance: Ottoman Empire; Turkey
- Service years: Ottoman: January 1901–1920; Turkey: 1920–April 21, 1920
- Rank: Kaymakam
- Commands: Chief aide-de-camp of the Second Army, Chief of Staff of the 3rd Cavalry Division, Chief of Staff of the XII Corps; 24th Division
- Conflicts: Italo-Turkish War; Balkan Wars; First World War; Turkish War of Independence

Mahmut Nedim Hendek (1880; Caucasus – 21 April 1920; Hendek) was an officer of the Ottoman Army and the Turkish Army. He was born to an ethnic Circassian family which later fled Russia to the Ottoman Empire. Hendek's birth name was Mahmut Nedim however he was later given the name Hendek due to his death whilst fighting against occupying Greek forces in Hendek on 21 April 1920.

== Medals and decorations ==
- Gallipoli Star (Ottoman Empire)
- Medal of Independence with Red Ribbon
- Order of the Medjidie 5th class

== See also ==
- List of high-ranking commanders of the Turkish War of Independence
- List of members of the Grand National Assembly of Turkey who died in office
