= Mustafa Varank =

Turkish politician

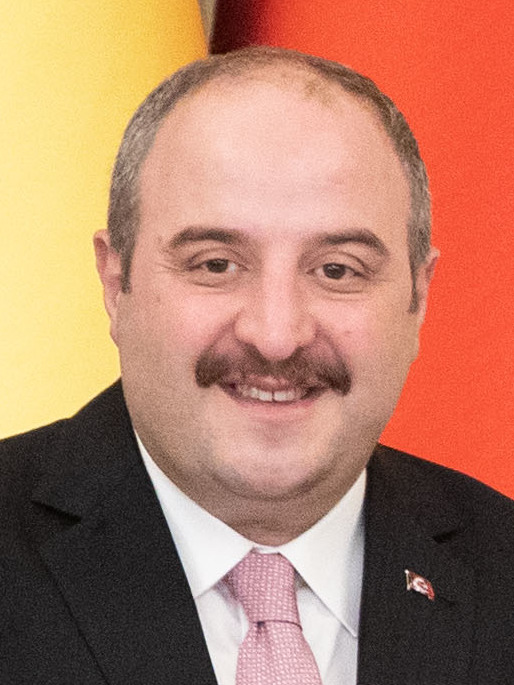

Minister of Industry and Technology
- In office 10 July 2018 – 4 June 2023
- President: Recep Tayyip Erdoğan
- Preceded by: Faruk Özlü
- Succeeded by: Mehmet Fatih Kacır

Personal details
- Born: 5 February 1976 (age 50) Of, Trabzon, Turkey
- Party: Justice and Development Party
- Education: Middle East Technical University Indiana University Bloomington

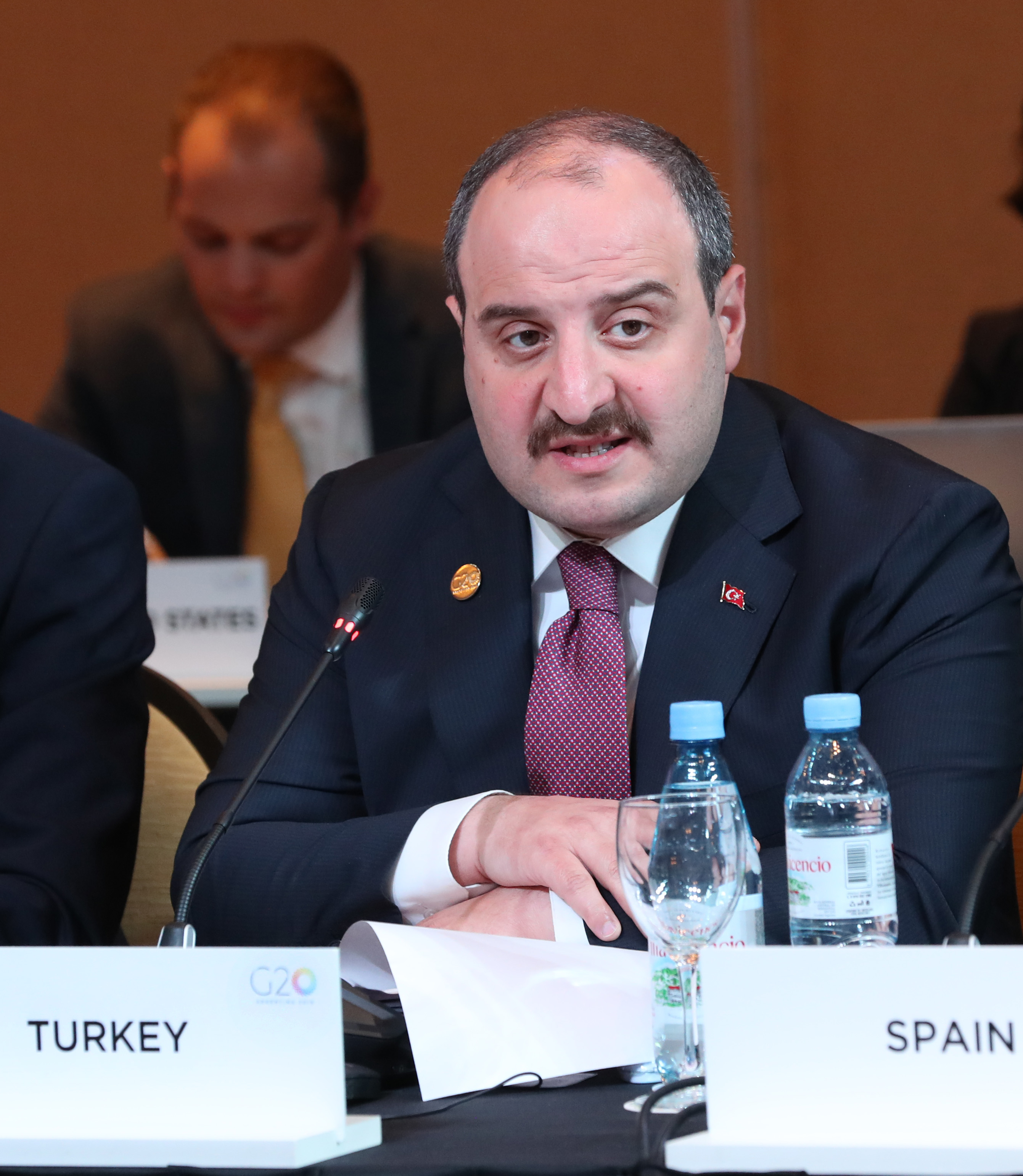
Mustafa Varank in 2018

Mustafa Varank (pronounced [mustafäh väränk]; 5 February 1976) is a Turkish politician and former civil servant who has been a member of the Grand National Assembly of Turkey for the Justice and Development Party (AKP) representing Bursa 2nd district since 2023. He served as Minister of Industry and Technology from 2018 to 2023.

== Early life and education ==
Varank was born in 1976 in Of, Trabzon Province the youngest of three siblings. He graduated primary school in Yedikule neighbourhood of Istanbul and attended the Istanbul İmam Hatip High School. He then studied political science and public administration at Middle East Technical University (METU) in Ankara, graduating in 1999, and moved to the United States to continue his studies. He completed a masters degree in computer science at Indiana University. According to Turkish press biographies he worked as a specialist at Florida State University and as a researcher and system administrator at Indiana University's Pervasive Technology Institute.

== Career ==
=== Advisor to Erdoğan (2005–2018) ===
Varank began working at the Prime minister's office in 2005. He became chief adviser to prime minister Erdoğan in 2011, and chief advisor to the president when Erdoğan took the office in 2014. In 2016 he was give the title of ambassador.

=== Minister of Industry and Technology (2018–2023) ===
When Erdoğan announced the first cabinet of the new presidential system on 9 July, 2018, he named Varank Minister of Industry and Technology. The ministry combined the former Ministry of Science, Industry and Technology with the Ministry of Development. According to Hürriyet Daily News Varank is one of Erdoğan's closest friends. He took office on 10 July 2018, succeeding Faruk Özlü. The ministry framed its policy around what the government called the "National Technology Move", which Varank described as a national struggle for technological independence. Among its instruments was the Technology-Oriented Industry move Program, which supported investment in medium high technology products made with local resources. In 2022 Varank said the program would prevent $50 billion in imports.

=== Togg ===
Togg, Turkey's first domestically developed car, was founded in 2018 by the Anadolu Group, BMC, Kök Group, Turkcell,Zorlu Holding and the Union of Chambers and Commodity Exchanges of Turkey (TOBB). Varank spoke at the groundbreaking of its factory in Gemlik, Bursa, on 18 July 2020, where he said the project aimed to build a technology base rather than a car plant. In 2020 he said the car will have 51% local content when it will be launched, reach 68% by 2026. He later told Parliament and Budget Committee that Togg and the Chinese battery maker Farasis would begin a battery investment in Gemlik. The Gemlik plant opened on 29 October 2022, With Varank one of those addressing the ceremony.

=== Teknofest ===
Varank regularly spoke at the opening ceremonies of Teknofest, an annual aviation. space and technology festival organized by the T3 Foundation and the ministry and presented awards to competition winners. He also attended Teknofest Azerbaijan in Baku.

=== Legal action against BirGün ===
In September 2022, Varank sued the newspaper BirGün, its board chairman and its reporter Ismail Ari for 50,000 Lira in non-pecuniary damages over a report that his cousin Sedat Varank had won 208 million Lira tender from the state owned Emlak Konut. The report was based on Emlak Konut's own disclosure to the public Disclosure Platform. Bianet reported that Varank later filed a third suite over a further ''BirGün'' article on a land tender in Bodrum. In Parliament Varank said that critics are trying to slander him through his relatives.

=== Departure from the cabinet ===
Varank left office on 3 June 2023, when Erdoğan announced a new cabinet after the elections. Deputy minister Mehmet Fatih Kacır succeeded him.

=== Member of Parliament (2023–present) ===
Varank stood as the lead candidate of the Justice and Development Party (AKP) in Bursa's 2ndelectoral district in the 14 May 2023 election and was elected. In June 2023 he was elected chair of the industry Trade, Energy, Natural Resources, Information and Technology Committee of the 28th Parliament.

== Personal life ==
Varank is married and the father of two children.

Varank's elder brother, İlhan Varank (born 1971), was a professor at Yıldız Technical University and head of its Computer and Instructional Technology Education department. He was shot outside of the Istanbul Metropolitan Municipality building in Saraçhane during the 2016 Turkish coup attempt on 15 July 2016.

Political offices
Preceded by Faruk Özlü	Minister of Industry and Technology; 2018–2023	Succeeded by Mehmet Fatih Kacır
