= Nilüfer Gürsoy =

Turkish politician (1921–2024)

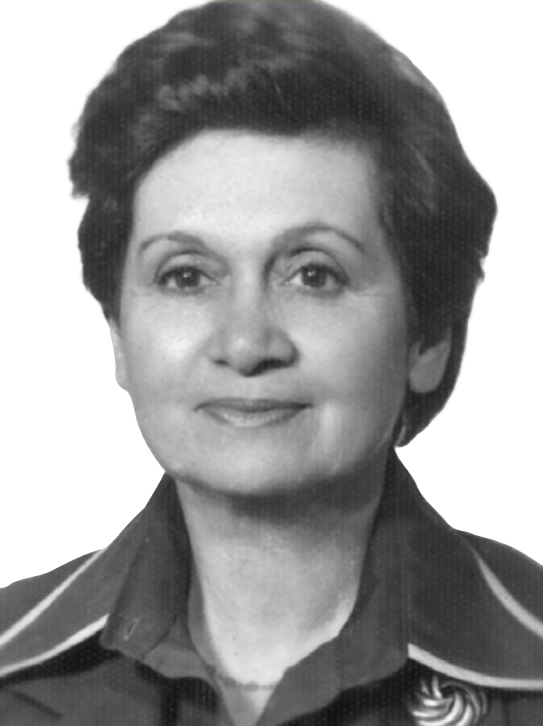
- Gürsoy in the late 1940s

Member of the Grand National Assembly
- In office 10 October 1965 – 2 October 1969
- Constituency: Bursa
- In office 14 October 1973 – 12 September 1980
- Constituency: Istanbul

Personal details
- Born: Nilüfer Bayar; 1 June 1921 Bursa, Ottoman Empire
- Died: 1 July 2024 (aged 103) Istanbul, Turkey
- Resting place: Cebeci Asri Cemetery
- Party: Justice Party (1961–1970, 1977–1980)
- Other political affiliations: Democratic Party (1970–1977)
- Spouse: Ahmet İhsan Gürsoy
- Children: 3
- Parents: Celâl Bayar (father); Reşide Bayar (mother)
- Education: Classical Philology
- Alma mater: Istanbul University; Ankara University
- Occupation: Politician, memoirist

Nilüfer Gürsoy (née Bayar; 1 June 1921 – 1 July 2024) was a Turkish philologist, politician and memoirist. She served in the parliament between 1965 and 1969, and from 1973 to 1980. She was the daughter of the third president of Turkey, Celâl Bayar.

== Education and academic life ==
Nilüfer Bayar received her primary education privately at home. She then attended Maarif Koleji (later TED Ankara College) for her secondary and high school education, graduating in 1939. The same year, she studied further, philosophy at Istanbul University. After one year she enrolled in the School of Language and History – Geography of Ankara University due to her family's move to Ankara, and studied classical philology. Following her graduation, she was appointed assistant in the Department of Ancient Greek Language in 1949. She worked on the doctoral thesis "Euripides' political views", and earned a Doctor of Philology degree in 1954.

She was dismissed from the university after the 1960 coup d'état when her father, President Celâl Bayar, and her husband Ahmet İhsan Gürsoy, Deputy of Kütahya from the Democrat Party, together with many other government officials and politicians, were arrested by the junta, and sent to Yassıada, a small island off the coast of Istanbul, to put on trials before a Supreme Court of Justice. Her employment was terminated while she was preparing to become an associate professor. She later filed a lawsuit against the university. She did not return to academic life even although she won the case.

== Politician career ==
She started her active political career by joining the 1961-established Justice Party (Turkish: Adalet Partisi, AP), a descendant of the Democrat Party, which had been banned after the 1960 coup d'état. She ran for the Justice Party for the Deputy of Bursa in the 1965 general election, and entered the Grand National Assembly of Turkey serving in the 13th Parliament until 1969.

She did not run in the 1969 general election. She resigned from the AP together with 40 other politicians, and joined the 1970-established Democratic Party (Turkish: Demokratik Parti, DP). She served in the party administration. She ran for the DP for the Deputy of Istanbul in the 1973 general election. She served in the 15th Parliament until 1977.

Gürsoy returned to her initial party AP and she ran in the 1977 general election for the Deputy of Istanbul. The 16th Parliament was ended through the 1980 coup d'état, and all political parties were banned. Thereafter, she withdrew from political life.

== Memoir writer ==
Born during the Turkish War of Independence, she witnessed important periods in the history of the Republic such as the Atatürk Period, Inönü Period, the Democrat Party Period and the coup d'état of 1960 and 1980.

She published her memoirs in 2014 regarding the 1960 coup d'état under the title 27 Mayıs Darbesi ve Bizler, Cumhurbaşkanı Celal Bayar'ın Kızı Anlatıyor ("27 May Coup d'état and Us, President Celal Bayar's Daughter Tells"). In 2021, when she was almost 100 years old, her poems and memoirs regarding the early political history of the Republic were published in the book İçimin Renkleri ("Colors of My Inside").

== Personal life and death ==
Nilüfer Gürsoy was born to Celâl Bayar and Reşide in Bursa on 1 June 1921. She had two brothers, Refii and Turgut. Her father was an associate of Atatürk. She married physician and politician Ahmet İhsan Gürsoy and had three daughters, who all became academics. Gürsoy lived in Kadıköy district of Istanbul. She served as the chairperson of the Celal Bayar Foundation. In 2015, she donated a collection of around 20,000 books, also including her father's, to the Library of History, Literature and Arts of the Kadıköy municipality in Istanbul. Gürsoy died on 1 July 2024, at the age of 103, the same age that her father Celâl Bayar died at. She was buried at Cebeci Asri Cemetery in Ankara.

== Books ==
- Bayar Gürsoy, Nilüfer (2 May 2014). 27 Mayıs Darbesi ve Bizler Cumhurbaşkanı Celal Bayar'ın Kızı Anlatıyor (in Turkish). Timaş Yayınları. p. 276. ISBN 978-605-081-628-0.
- Gürsoy, Nilüfer (March 2021). İçimin Renkleri (in Turkish). Bağlam Yayıncılık. p. 160. ISBN 978-605-991-176-4.
