= Umurbey, Gemlik =

Neighborhood in Bursa Province, Turkey

Umurbey
- Neighbourhood
- Location in Turkey Umurbey (Marmara)
- Coordinates: 40.414°N 29.181°E
- Country: Turkey
- Province: Bursa
- District: Gemlik
- Population (2022): 4,141
- Time zone: UTC+3 (TRT)

Umurbey is a neighborhood in the municipality and district of Gemlik, Bursa Province, Turkey. Its population is 4,141 (2022). It was an independent municipality until it was merged into the municipality of Gemlik in 2008.

Celal Bayar Memorial Tomb and a large park around it, Celal Bayar Foundation Museum, library, Bayar monument-statue are located in Umurbey's Square. Above the square can be seen the 19th century museum house where Celal Bayar was born in 1883.

The son of Aykut Alp, the commander of the sea front in the siege of Gemlik, was buried in Umurbey, a place overlooking the sea upon the will of Kara Ali Pasha Tomb.

== Population ==
Historical population
| Year | Pop. | ±% p.a. |
|---|---|---|
| 1990 | 3,479 | — |
| 1997 | 3,173 | −1.31% |
| 2007 | 3,217 | +0.14% |
| 2012 | 3,244 | +0.17% |
| 2017 | 3,306 | +0.38% |
| 2022 | 4,141 | +4.61% |
Source: 1990 census, 1997 census and TÜIK (2007-2022)
