= Esat Sagay =

Turkish politician (1874–1938)

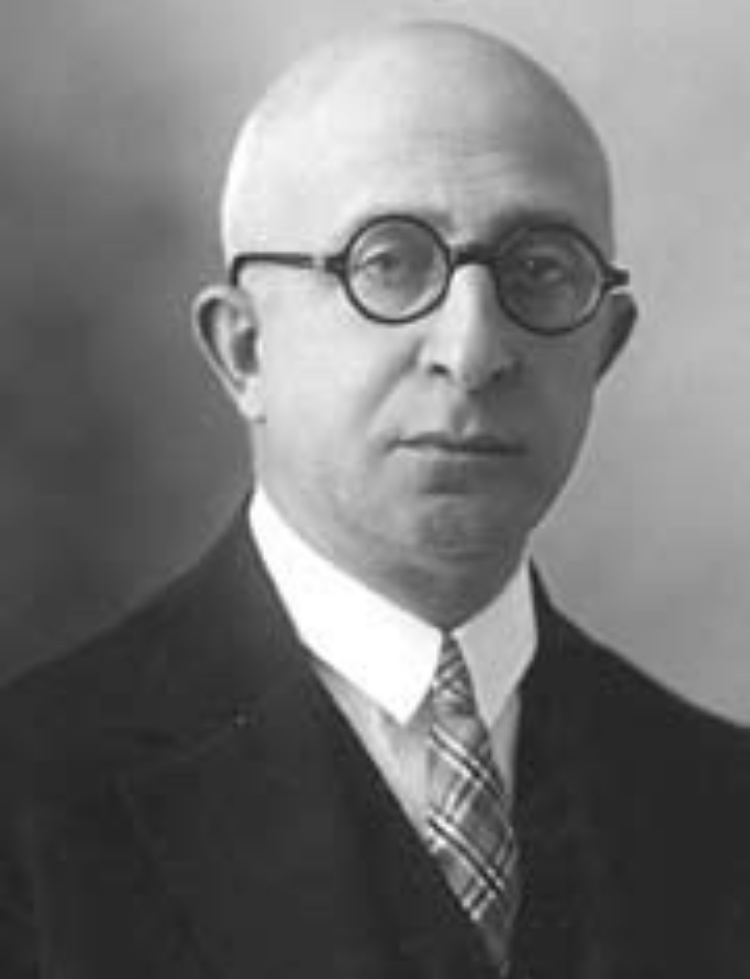
- Esat Sagay in the 1930s

Minister of National Education
- In office 27 September 1930 – 19 September 1932
- Preceded by: Hüsnü Taray
- Succeeded by: Reşit Galip
- Prime Minister: İsmet İnönü

Personal details
- Born: 1874 Karaferye, Ottoman Empire
- Died: 22 May 1938 (aged 63–64)
- Occupation: Military officer

Esat Sagay (1874 – 22 May 1938) was an Ottoman-born Turkish military officer, educator, politician and former government minister.

== Life ==
Sagay was born in Veria in Greece, then a part of the Ottoman Empire, in 1874. He graduated from the military academy in 1894. Following a service term in Syria, then a part of the Ottoman Empire, he returned to Constantinople as a teacher in the military academy. Mustafa Kemal (later Atatürk), who would be the founder of Turkish Republic, was among his students. During World War I, he fought in the Gallipoli Campaign. In 1919, while in the rank of a colonel, he retired from the military service, and returned to civilian life. He died on 22 May 1938.

== Political life ==
He joined the Republican People's Party and in 1927, was elected into the parliament as a deputy of Bursa Province. In the 6th and the 7th government, he served as the Minister of National Education between 27 September 1930 and 19 September 1932. Being a former teacher of Mustafa Kemal Pasha, he was one of the most prestigious members of the cabinet. However, he was a conservative minister, and was severely criticized by Reşit Galip, one of the revolutionists of the party. Finally, Esat Sagay resigned from his post in the ministry, and was replaced by Reşit Galip. His memoirs were later published . In his memoirs, he claims that he was instrumental in Reşit Galip's appointment as his successor.
