= Hikmet Bayur =

Turkish politician and historian

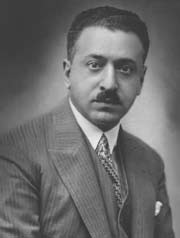

Minister of National Education
- In office 27 October 1933 – 9 July 1934
- Prime Minister: İsmet İnönü
- Preceded by: Reşit Galip
- Succeeded by: Zeynel Abidin Özmen

Personal details
- Born: 1891 Constantinople, Ottoman Empire
- Died: 6 March 1980 (aged 88–89) Istanbul, Turkey
- Party: Republican People's Party (CHP); Democrat Party (DP); Nation Party
- Education: Galatasaray High School, Paris University
- Occupation: Teacher, Politician

Hikmet Bayur (also known as Yusuf Hikmet Bayur, 1891 – 6 March 1980) was a Turkish politician. He was the grandson of Kâmil Pasha, one of the Grand Viziers of the Ottoman Empire.

== Early life ==
Bayur was born in 1891 in Constantinople. He graduated from Galatasaray High School in 1908 and from the Faculty of Science of Paris University (Sorbonne) in 1912. After some years in Paris he returned home to teacher at Galatasaray High School in 1912, remaining there until 1920.

== Career ==
=== War ===
During the Turkish War of Independence, he joined the Turkish National Movement and fought on the Salihli front. Postwar he was appointed as the director of political affairs. At the end of the war, he was appointed as an adviser to the Turkish delegation to Conference of Lausanne.

=== Republic ===
Turkey was proclaimed as the Turkish Republic on 29 October 1923. Bayur was appointed to various embassies and consulates – London (1923–1925), Belgrade (1925–1927) and Kabul (1928) – before becoming Secretary General of the Presidency.

In the general election of 1935, he was elected as the Republican People's Party (CHP) deputy from the Manisa Province. Between 27 October 1933 and 9 July 1934, he was the Minister of National Education in the 7th government of Turkey. When Atatürk died on 10 November 1938, İsmet İnönü was elected as the new president. Bayur was the only deputy in parliament who opposed İnönü.

=== Multiparty period ===
When the Democrat Party (DP) was founded in 1946, Bayur resigned from the Republican People's Party (CHP) and joined the DP. Following disappointment with the DP, he became one of the charter members of the Nation Party in 1948. Bayour became speaker of the party, before resigning from the Nation Party in 1953 because it was against Kemalism. In the 2 May 1954 and 27 October 1957 elections, he was elected as a DP deputy from Manisa Province. After the 1960 Turkish coup d'etat, Bayur was arrested and then released in 1963. Following his release from prison, he began a career in journalism and started writing for the newspaper Kudret.

He died in Istanbul on 6 March 1980.

== Books ==
- 1934: Yeni Türkiye Devletinin Harici Siyaseti ("Foreign Policy of the New Turkish State")
- 1940: Ahval-i Hazıra ("Circumstances of the Present State")
- 1940–67: Türk İnkılabı Tarihi ("History of the Turkish Revolution")
- 1946–50: Hindistan Tarihi ("History of India")
- 1963: Atatürk, Hayatı ve Eserleri ("Atatürk: His Life and His Works")
- 1974: XX. Yüzyılda Türklüğün Tarih ve Acun Siyasası Üzerindeki Etkileri ("The Influence of Turkishness on History and Global Politics in the Twentieth Century")
