= Reşit Galip =

Turkish politician

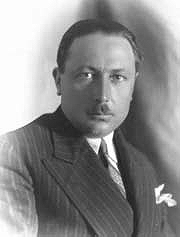
- Reşit Galip in 1931

Ministry of National Education
- In office 19 September 1932 – 13 July 1933
- Prime Minister: İsmet İnönü
- Preceded by: Esat Sagay
- Succeeded by: Hikmet Bayur

Personal details
- Born: 1893 Sanjak of Rhodes, Ottoman Empire
- Died: 5 March 1934 (aged 40–41) Ankara, Turkey
- Party: Republican People's Party
- Education: Medicine
- Alma mater: Faculty of Medicine, Istanbul University
- Occupation: Politician, civil servant

Mustafa Reşit Galip (1893 – 5 March 1934) was a Turkish politician in the early years of the Turkish Republic. By profession, he was a medical doctor.

== Early years ==
He was born in the Sanjak of Rhodes (now an island of Greece, then a part of the Ottoman Empire) in 1883. His father was Galip, a judge and his mother was Münevver. He completed his elementary education in Rhodes. According to his granddaughter Feyhan Oran, when Rhodes was occupied by Italy he escaped to İzmir where he finished his highschool education. Then, he travelled to Istanbul to study medicine. During the Balkan War and the First World War he voluntarily served in the fronts. In 1917 he graduated from the medicine school of Istanbul University. Although he briefly served as an assistant in the faculty, he later on moved to Tavşanlı (a town in West Anatolia) to participate in the Turkish War of Independence. Towards the end of the war, he was appointed as the official doctor in Mersin. In 1925 he was elected as an MP from Aydın Province.

== In politics ==
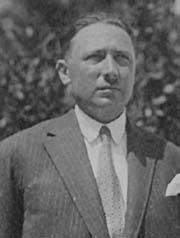
Reşit Galip in the 1920s

He was always interested in politics. In İzmir and Istanbul he published bulletins and in Mersin he wrote in a local newspaper as the chief editor. While serving as an MP, he was elected a member of the Independence Tribunals. In 1930s he served as the charter member of two associations which were supported by Kemal Atatürk, the founder of Turkish Republic; Turkish Language Association and Turkish Historical Society. He later on became the president of Turkish Language Association. During his speech at the First Turkish History Congress in 1932, he claimed that the Sumerians, the Ancient Egyptians or the Ancient Greeks where originally of Turkish origin. One of the dubious evidences he presented for this claim was that the Egyptian Amun priests were of Turkish race due their brachycephalic skull. Between 19 September 1932 and 13 July 1933 he served as the Minister of National Education. (see 7th government of Turkey)

During his brief service period he initiated university reforms and planned Museum of Anatolian Civilizations, an important museum in Ankara. He is also known as the creator of daily student oath.

== Death ==
While serving in the wars he had contracted tuberculosis. On 5 March 1934, he died in Ankara. He was laid to rest in Cebeci Asri Cemetery. He was survived by his wife and three children.

== Legacy ==
A street in Ankara and one in Nazilli in Aydın Province are named after Reşit Galip. A primary schools one in Zeytinburnu, Istanbul and one in Çankaya, Ankara are also named after him.
