= Zekai Apaydın =

Turkish politician

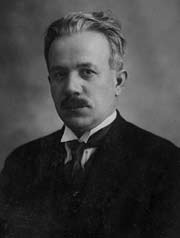

Minister of National Defense
- In office 29 December 1930 – 1 March 1935
- Prime Minister: İsmet İnönü
- Preceded by: Abdülhalik Renda
- Succeeded by: Kazım Özalp

Personal details
- Born: 1884 Bosnia, Ottoman Empire
- Died: 29 April 1947 (aged 62–63) Istanbul, Turkey

Zekai Apaydın (1884 – 29 April 1947) was a former Turkish civil servant, diplomat and politician.

== Early life ==
He was born in 1884 in Bosnia, then a nominal part of the Ottoman Empire under Austrian rule. He graduated from the İzmir highschool and the faculty of Political Sciences. He served in Uşak, Eskişehir, Mersin and Kayseri as the sanjak governor. Following the defeat of the Ottoman Empire in the First World War, he resigned and joined the nationalists.

== Politics ==
He was elected to Turkish Parliament from Aydın Province and later from Diyarbakır Province. In the 2nd government of Turkey he served as the Ministry of Agriculture between 6 March 1924 and 20 November 1924. In the 6th government of Turkey he served as the Ministry of Public Works between 27 September 1930 and 29 December 1930. But after a reshuffle in the government, he was appointed as the Ministry of National Defense on 29 December 1930. He kept the same seat in the next government up to 1 March 1935.

== Diplomacy ==
After his term in the second government he was appointed as the ambassador to London in 1924 and to Moscow in 1925.

== Death ==
He died in Istanbul on 29 April 1947.

Political offices
Preceded by (New establishment)	Ministry of Agriculture; 6 Mar 1924 – 20 Aug 1924	Succeeded by Şükrü Kaya
Preceded by Recep Peker	Ministry of Public Works; 27 Sep 1930 – 29 Dec 1930	Succeeded by Hilmi Uran
Preceded by Abdülhalik Renda	Ministry of National Defense; 29 Dec 1930 – 1 Mar 1935	Succeeded by Kazım Özalp
