= Halit Karsıalan =

Turkish military officer who made a name for himself for his bravery

Halit Karsıalan 1319-P. 257
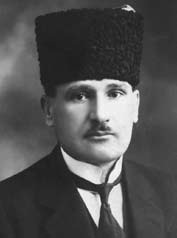
- Born: 1883; Beşiktaş, Istanbul, Ottoman Empire
- Died: 14 February 1925 (aged 41–42); Ankara, Turkey
- Burial place: Edirnekapı Martyr's Cemetery İstanbul (1925); State Cemetery, Ankara (1988)
- Military career
- Allegiance: Ottoman Empire; Turkey
- Service years: Ottoman: 1903–1919; Turkey: 1919 – 14 February 1925
- Rank: Mirliva
- Commands: Mürettep Teşkilat-ı Mahsusa Regiment, Independent Artvin Detachment, Çoruh Detachment, Western Dersim Area Command, 3rd Caucasian Division; 9th Caucasian Division, Kocaeli Group, 12th Group, Kocaeli Group
- Conflicts: Italo-Turkish War; First Balkan War; First World War; Turkish War of Independence
- Other work: Member of the GNAT (Ardahan)

Halit Karsıalan, commonly known as "Deli" Halid Pasha (1883 in Beşiktaş, Istanbul, Ottoman Empire – 14 February 1925) was a Turkish career officer and politician.

After graduating from Military School in 1903, he joined the Ottoman Army as a lieutenant. He took his place in several military campaigns, starting from Yemen in 1908, the Italo-Turkish War in 1911 and the First Balkan War (1912-1913). Halit Bey was appointed to the Caucasus Front during the First World War. He led successful campaigns against the Russians in Kars, Sarikamis and Ardahan, however the Ottomans lost the war. During the war, Ottoman troops under his command carried out the massacres of 7,000 Armenians in the regions of Artvin and Ardanuç.

After the war, Halit Bey joined Mustafa Kemal Atatürk for the Turkish Independence War. In the beginning, he served in the Eastern Front against the Armenians, but after the Gumru Agreement, he was sent to the Western Front against the Greeks. Due to his daringness and courage in the battlefield, he was nicknamed "Mad" (Deli). After the war, he was honored with the War of Independence Medal.

Halit Bey became Ardahan Deputy in the Turkish Grand National Assembly. However, he was shot on 9 February 1925 and died on 14 February. A fight broke out in the parliament over pensions to army veterans and led to a scuffle. Several attempts by other parliament members failed to calm him down. He attacked one of the deputies, and when Ali Çetinkaya intervened, he pulled out his pistol and started shooting at him. The two of them had a long-standing feud dating back to Ottoman-Italian conflict in Tripoli. Çetinkaya tripped on a carpet and fell over while trying to escape, and as Halit put his gun to Çetinkaya's head to execute him, two other deputies intervened and his shot missed. He was shot from behind by Rauf Bey (deputy representing Rize). He received medical care in the parliament and had surgery to remove the bullet but died a few days later. Çetinkaya was not charged after prosecutors concluded that he acted in self-defence, and the autopsy report listed "pneumonia" as a cause of death.

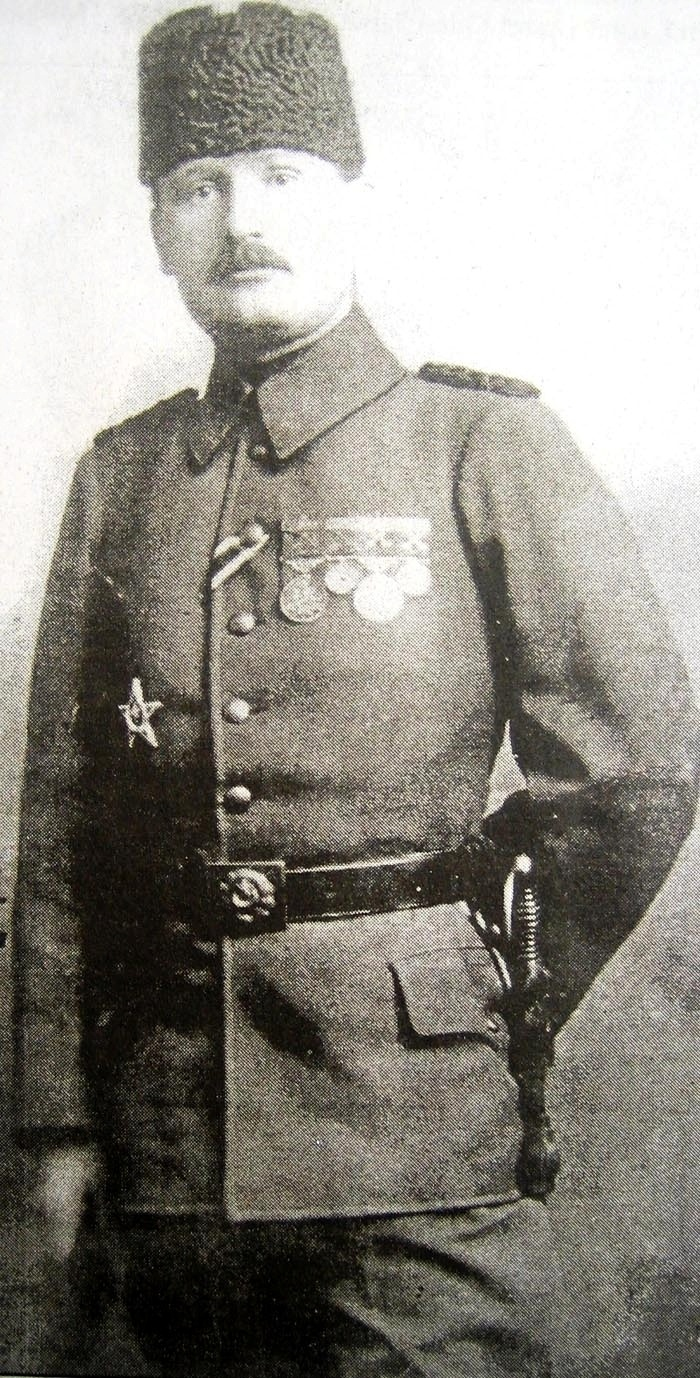
Halit Karsıalan.

== See also ==
- List of high-ranking commanders of the Turkish War of Independence
- List of members of the Grand National Assembly of Turkey who died in office
