= Mazhar Germen =

Turkish politician

Dr. Mazhar Germen
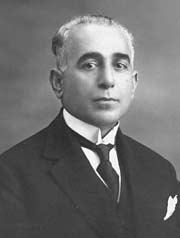

Member of the Grand National Assembly

Personal details
- Born: 1887 Aydın, Ottoman Empire
- Died: 6 November 1967 (aged 79–80)

Mazhar Germen (1887, Aydın – 6 November 1967) was a Turkish physician, social democratic politician and women's rights activist. He is most notable for supporting the proclamation of the Women's People Party in the 1920s.

== Biography ==
He was born in Aydın in 1887.

He graduated from medical school and was the chief doctor of Eskişehir Military Hospital. He was elected as a member of the parliament in Aydın for eight consecutive years. In the first eight years, he was a deputy; he was a physician and politician who had served as the Deputy Governor of the health and social affairs (Ministry of Health and Social Welfare) in the 3rd government (1st Ali Fethi Okyar Government). He died on 6 November 1967.
