= Kâzım Özalp =

3rd Speaker of the Parliament of Turkey

- Özalp, in 1935

Speaker of the Parliament of Turkey
- In office 26 November 1924 – 1 March 1935
- President: Mustafa Kemal Atatürk
- Prime Minister: İsmet İnönü
- Preceded by: Ali Fethi Okyar
- Succeeded by: Mustafa Abdülhalik Renda

Minister of National Defense
- In office 1 March 1935 – 18 January 1939
- President: Mustafa Kemal Atatürk; İsmet İnönü
- Prime Minister: İsmet İnönü; Celal Bayar
- Preceded by: Zekai Apaydın
- Succeeded by: Ahmet Naci Tınaz
- In office 10 January 1922 – 21 November 1924
- President: Mustafa Kemal Atatürk
- Prime Minister: Rauf Orbay; İsmet İnönü
- Preceded by: Refet Bele
- Succeeded by: Ali Fethi Okyar

Personal details
- Born: Kâzım Fikri; 17 February 1882 Köprülü (Veles), Kosovo Vilayet, Ottoman Empire
- Died: 6 June 1968 (aged 86) Ankara, Turkey
- Party: Republican People's Party
- Nickname: Kâzım Köprülü

Military service
- Allegiance: Ottoman Empire (1902–1920); Turkey (1920–1927)
- Rank: General
- Commands: Van Gendarmerie Regiment, Van Mobile Gendarmerie Division, 36th Division, 37th Caucasian Division, VI Corps (deputy), 60th Division, 61st Division, XIV Corps (deputy), Kocaeli Area Command, III Corps, Minister of National Defense
- Battles/wars: Balkan Wars; World War I; Turkish War of Independence

Kâzım Özalp (17 February 1882 – 6 June 1968) was a Turkish military officer, politician, and one of the leading figures in the Turkish War of Independence.

== Biography ==
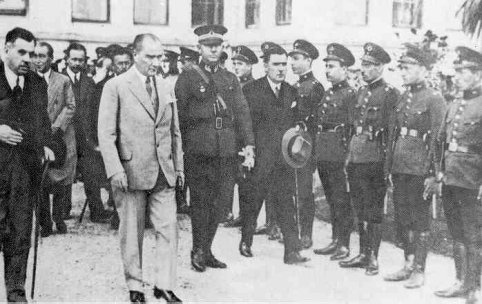
Kazım Özalp is leaving the Dolmabahçe Palace with Mustafa Kemal Atatürk

Born in Köprülü (now Veles, North Macedonia), in the Kosovo Vilayet of the Ottoman Empire. Kâzım Fikri graduated from the Ottoman Military College in 1902 and completed the College of War in 1905. Kâzım Özalp was involved in the 31 March Incident in 1909. He was a military commander of the Ottoman forces during the Balkan Wars. In 1917, he was promoted to the rank of the colonel during World War I. He was one of the military commanders who organized resistance groups against the occupation of Izmir by Greek forces. During the Turkish War of Independence, he fought at several fronts. In 1921, Kâzım Özalp was promoted to the rank General for his success at the Battle of Sakarya. After the Kurdish Sheikh Said Rebellion was subdued, he contributed to the Report for Reform of the East, which advised to establish Inspectorates General in the eastern provinces of Turkey and crush the Kurdish rebels in the region.

Already a member of the first term of the parliament of the newly established Republic as an MP from Balıkesir Province, Kâzım Fikri served as the Minister of Defense in several cabinets from 1921 to 1925, and later from 1935 to 1939. He was elected Speaker of the Turkish Grand National Assembly from 1924 to 1935. In 1950, he was elected to the parliament as an MP from Van Province. He retired from active politics in 1954. He was rumored to have been a Bektashi possibly because of his opposition to the decision to close Bektashi centers (Tekke).

Kâzım Özalp wrote his memoirs in his book Milli Mücadele ("National Struggle"). He died on 6 June 1968 in Ankara. His remains were transferred to the Turkish State Cemetery.

== See also ==
- List of high-ranking commanders of the Turkish War of Independence

Political offices
Preceded by Refet Bele	Minister of National Defense; 10 January 1922 – 21 November 1924	Succeeded by Ali Fethi Okyar
Preceded by Ali Fethi Okyar	Speaker of the Parliament of Turkey; 26 November 1924 – 1 March 1935	Succeeded by Mustafa Abdulhalik Renda
Preceded by Zekai Apaydın	Minister of National Defense; 1 March 1935 – 18 January 1939	Succeeded by Ahmet Naci Tınaz
