= Refik Saydam =

4th Prime Minister of the Republic of Turkey from 1939 to 1942

Dr. Refik Saydam
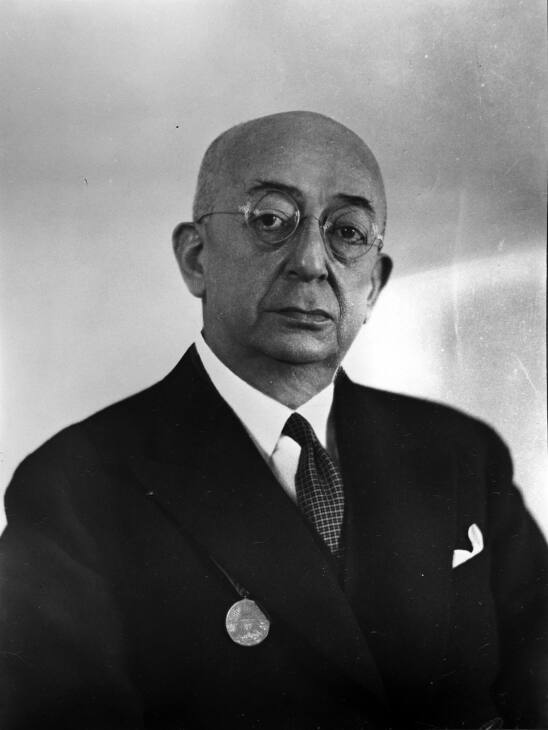
- Saydam in 1939

4th Prime Minister of Turkey
- In office 25 January 1939 – 8 July 1942
- President: İsmet İnönü
- Preceded by: Celâl Bayar
- Succeeded by: Ahmet Fikri Tüzer

Minister of Interior
- In office 11 November 1938 – 25 January 1939
- Prime Minister: Celâl Bayar
- Preceded by: Mehmet Cemil Uybadın
- Succeeded by: Mehmet Faik Öztrak

Minister of Health
- In office 4 March 1925 – 25 October 1937
- Prime Minister: İsmet İnönü
- Preceded by: Mazhar Germen
- Succeeded by: Ahmet Hulusi Alataş
- In office 30 October 1923 – 21 November 1924
- Prime Minister: İsmet İnönü
- Preceded by: Rıza Nur
- Succeeded by: Mazhar Germen
- In office 10 March 1921 – 20 December 1921
- Prime Minister: Fevzi Çakmak
- Preceded by: Adnan Adıvar
- Succeeded by: Rıza Nur

Minister of National Education
- In office 13 August 1933 – 26 October 1933
- Prime Minister: İsmet İnönü
- Preceded by: Reşit Galip
- Succeeded by: Yusuf Hikmet Bayur
- In office 17 September 1930 – 26 September 1930
- Prime Minister: İsmet İnönü
- Preceded by: Cemal Hüsnü Taray
- Succeeded by: Esat Sagay

Member of the Grand National Assembly
- In office 28 June 1923 – 8 July 1942
- Constituency: Istanbul (1923, 1927, 1931, 1935, 1939)

Personal details
- Born: İbrahim Refik; 8 September 1881 Constantinople, Ottoman Empire
- Died: 8 July 1942 (aged 60) Istanbul, Turkey
- Party: Republican People's Party (CHP)
- Education: Gülhane Military Medical Academy
- Profession: Physician
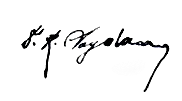
- Signature

İbrahim Refik Saydam (8 September 1881 – 8 July 1942) was a Turkish physician, politician and the fourth Prime Minister of Turkey, serving from 25 January 1939 until his death on 8 July 1942.

== Biography ==
Saydam was born in Istanbul in 1881 as the son of Hacı Ahmet Efendi of Çankırı. After completing primary and secondary education in Fatih Military Junior High School, he entered to Military School of Medicine in 1899. He went on a training course at Gülhane as of graduating with the rank of doctor captain on 4 November 1905. He was assigned as a doctor at Maltepe Military Hospital and Feshane Factory between the years 1907-1910 and improved his expertise in military camps and hospitals by being sent to Germany in 1910. He was then sent to Berlin from 1910 to 1912 to train and study as part of an Ottoman initiative to reform the army through the selection of officers via competition. Saydam stayed in this program until he was ordered back to the Ottoman Empire.

He was a medic in the Ottoman Army during the dissolution of the empire. He created a medicine to cure typhus, which was used largely by the Central Powers.

Saydam was one of the key people of the Independence War. He landed at Samsun with Mustafa Kemal (later named: Atatürk) in 1919 to start the resistance in Anatolia. He was known as a reformist while he was the Prime Minister. Just three years after his death, the one-party period came to an end in Turkey.

=== Political life ===
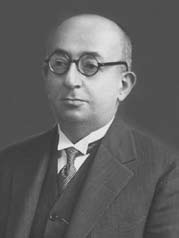
Refik Saydam in the 1920s

Saydam became the vice-president of the Department of Health of the Ministry of War on 1 December 1913 and was promoted to the rank of major on 1 June 1915. Meanwhile, he established the Institute of Bacteriology and his vaccines against epidemics and especially typhus had been effective. After the truce, he assigned to the order of 9th Army Inspectorship and passed to Anatolia along with Mustafa Kemal as the health inspector of the army, soon named as the 3rd Army Inspectorship, on 15 May 1919. He attended to Erzurum and Sivas Congresses, came to Ankara with the delegation committee and joined to the opening ceremony of the Grand National Assembly of Turkey with the elections held for the first term as the deputy of Bayazıt on 23 April 1920. He was elected as the Minister of Health in the Council of Ministers under the presidency of Fevzi Pasha, as the Minister of Health and Social Relief upon the resignation of Adnan, and resigned from ministry suggesting his sickness on 14 December 1921.

Being elected as Istanbul deputy, he officiated as the Minister of Health under the cabinet of Ismet Pasha in 2nd, 3rd, 4th, and 5th sessions.

After the death of Atatürk, at the Second Bayar Government formed on 11 November 1938, Saydam performed as the Minister of Interior and was assigned as the general secretary of the Republican People's Party. He was appointed to Prime Ministry of the 11th and 12th government of Turkey by President İsmet İnönü as Istanbul Deputy at the 6th session elections on 25 January 1939.

During this duty, he died in Istanbul on 8 July 1942 and was buried in Ankara.

Endeavoring to extend the health services and establishing health facilities, especially the Hıfzıssıha Foundation which is today known with his name, at the period of his health ministry, he also tried to protect the nation from the negative impacts of World War II during the period of prime ministry. He was never married.

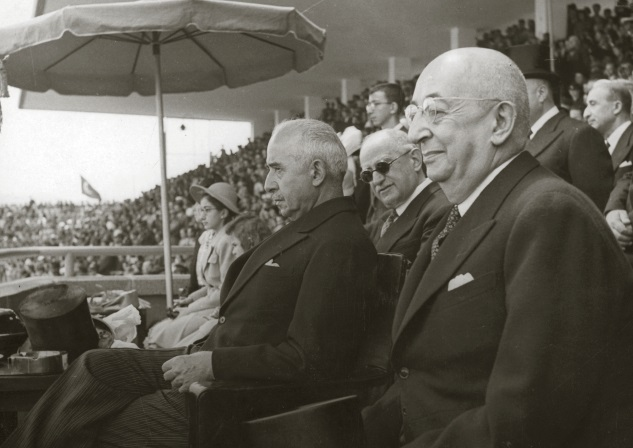
Ismet Inonu and Refik Saydam, 1939

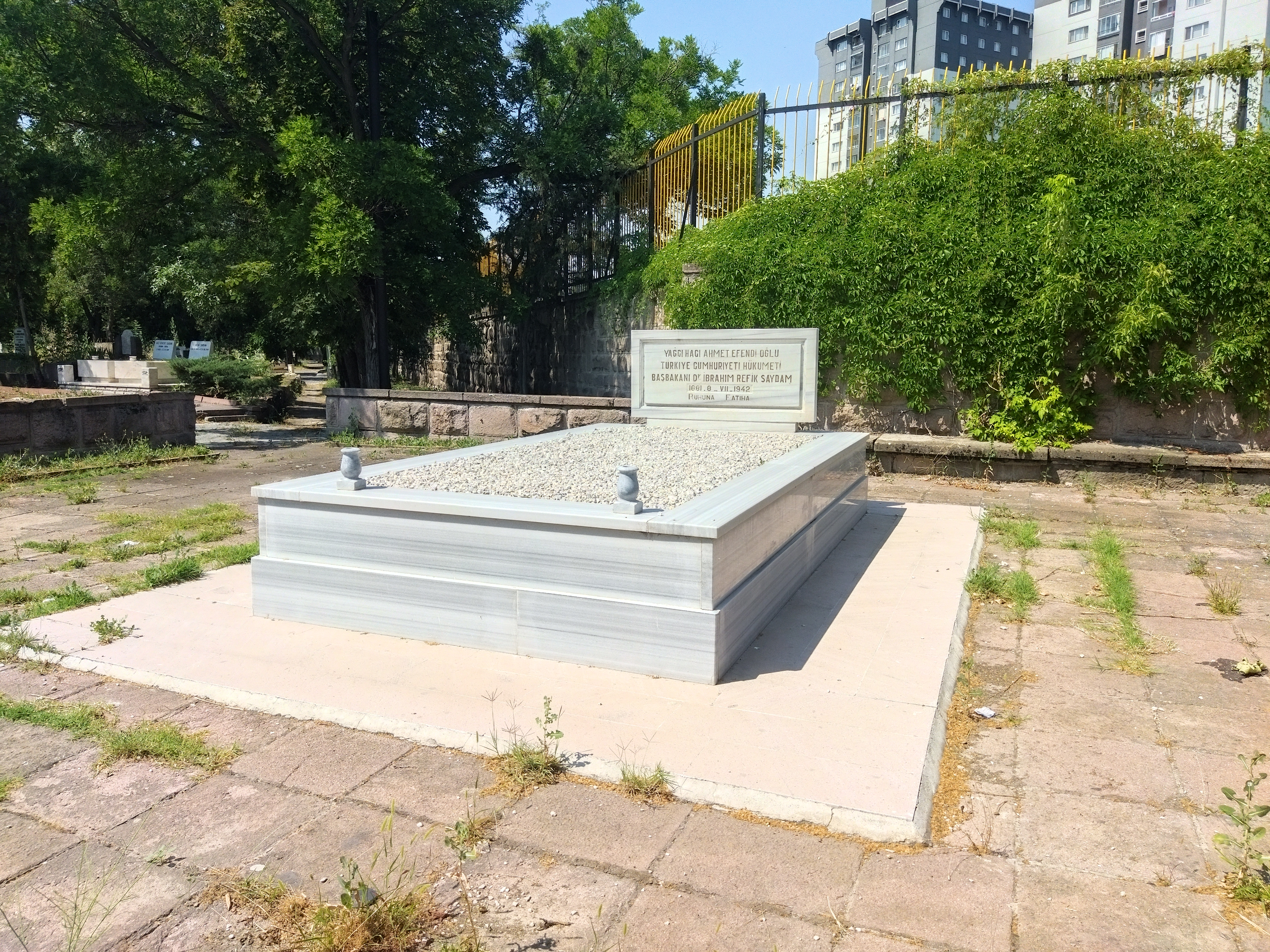
Grave of Refik Saydam at Cebeci Asri Cemetery

== See also ==
- List of prime ministers of Turkey

== Sources ==
- Ministry of Culture and Tourism, the General Directorate of Cultural Heritages and Museums

Political offices
Preceded by Adnan Adıvar	Minister of Health; 10 March 1921 – 20 December 1921	Succeeded by Rıza Nur
Preceded by Rıza Nur	Minister of Health; 30 October 1923 – 21 November 1924	Succeeded by Mazhar Germen
Preceded by Mazhar Germen	Minister of Health; 4 March 1925 – 25 October 1937	Succeeded by Ahmet Hulusi Alataş
Preceded by Cemal Hüsnü Taray	Minister of National Education; 17 September 1930 – 26 September 1930	Succeeded by Esat Sagay
Preceded by Reşit Galip	Minister of National Education; 13 August 1933 – 26 October 1933	Succeeded by Yusuf Hikmet Bayur
Preceded by Mehmet Cemil Uybadın	Minister of the Interior; 11 November 1938 – 25 January 1939	Succeeded by Mehmet Faik Öztrak
Preceded by Celâl Bayar	Prime Minister of Turkey; 25 January 1939 – 8 July 1942	Succeeded by Şükrü Saracoğlu
