= Ali Çetinkaya =

Turkish military officer and politician

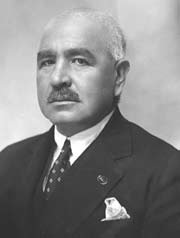

1st Minister of Transport
- In office 3 April 1939 – 20 November 1940
- President: İsmet İnönü
- Prime Minister: Celâl Bayar
- Preceded by: Office established
- Succeeded by: Cevdet Kerim İncedayı

10th Minister of Public Works
- In office 16 February 1934 – 3 April 1939
- President: Mustafa Kemal Atatürk; İsmet İnönü
- Prime Minister: İsmet İnönü; Celâl Bayar

Member of the Grand National Assembly
- In office 23 April 1920 – 5 August 1946
- Constituency: Afyonkarahisar (1920, 1923, 1927, 1931, 1935, 1939, 1943)

Personal details
- Born: 1878 Karahisar-ı Sahib, Hüdavendigâr Vilayet, Ottoman Empire
- Died: 21 February 1949 (aged 70–71) Istanbul, Turkey
- Party: Republican People's Party
- Education: Turkish Military Academy

Military service
- Allegiance: Ottoman Empire (1898–1919); Turkey (1919–1926)
- Branch/service: Ottoman Army; Turkish Army
- Rank: Brigadier
- Commands: 172nd Regiment
- Battles/wars: Italo-Turkish War; Balkan Wars; World War I; Greco-Turkish War

Ali Çetinkaya, also known as "Kel" Ali Bey (1878 – 21 February 1949) was an Ottoman-born Turkish army officer and politician, who served eight terms in the Grand National Assembly of Turkey, including a period in 1939–40 as his country's first Minister of Transport. On 9 February 1925, he shot Halit Karsıalan in the Turkish Parliament. Karsıalan died from his injuries five days later. Çetinkaya was not charged after prosecutors concluded that he acted in self-defence.

== Biography ==
He was born in Kara Hisâr-i Sâhib (present day Afyonkarahisar) in Hüdavendigâr Vilayet as the son of Ahmed Efendi. He studied in the Bursa Military High School (Bursa Askerî İdadisi ). After graduating from military highschool, he entered the Ottoman Military Academy (Mekteb-i Füsûn-u Harbiyye-i Şâhâne ) In 1898 he graduated academy and joined the Ottoman military as a Second Lieutenant (Mülâzım-ı Sani ). During World War I, he served for the army in the Caucasus and Galicia fronts.

When the Greek forces were landing at Smyrna on May 15, 1919, he was a lieutenant colonel and the commander of the Ottoman 172nd Infantry Regiment stationed in the Aegean coastal town of Ayvalık. His regiment was under the command of the 56th Division of Hurrem Bey. Ali played a key role in the first stage of the Greco-Turkish War of 1919–1922, starting with the opening battle against the occupying Greek forces.

He was briefly able to hold back the advance into the city of Greek occupation forces. His action is considered to mark the first shots fired by regular forces in the 1919–22 Greco-Turkish War which was part of the wider Turkish War of Independence, although there were earlier confrontations in which irregular militias participated, including the battle involving Hasan Tahsin in İzmir, as well as actions in Urla and Ödemiş. The hill in Ayvalık from where the first shots were fired is now called İlk Kurşun Tepesi (First Bullet Hill). Today there is a military rehabilitation center on that hill for Turkish Army soldiers.

After the war, Ali Çetinkaya was elected to Turkish Grand National Assembly for eight successive terms and served until 1942, holding ministerial posts in six different governments, including, with the formation of a Ministry of Transport, becoming Turkey's first Minister of Transport.

Ali Çetinkaya died in Istanbul in the year of his 71st birthday.

Ali Çetinkaya is considered a hero in Turkey. Cunda Island of Ayvalık was renamed Alibey Adası (Ali Bey Island) after him, although the old name remains in common use.

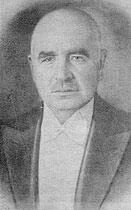
Another image of Ali Çetinkaya in the 1920s

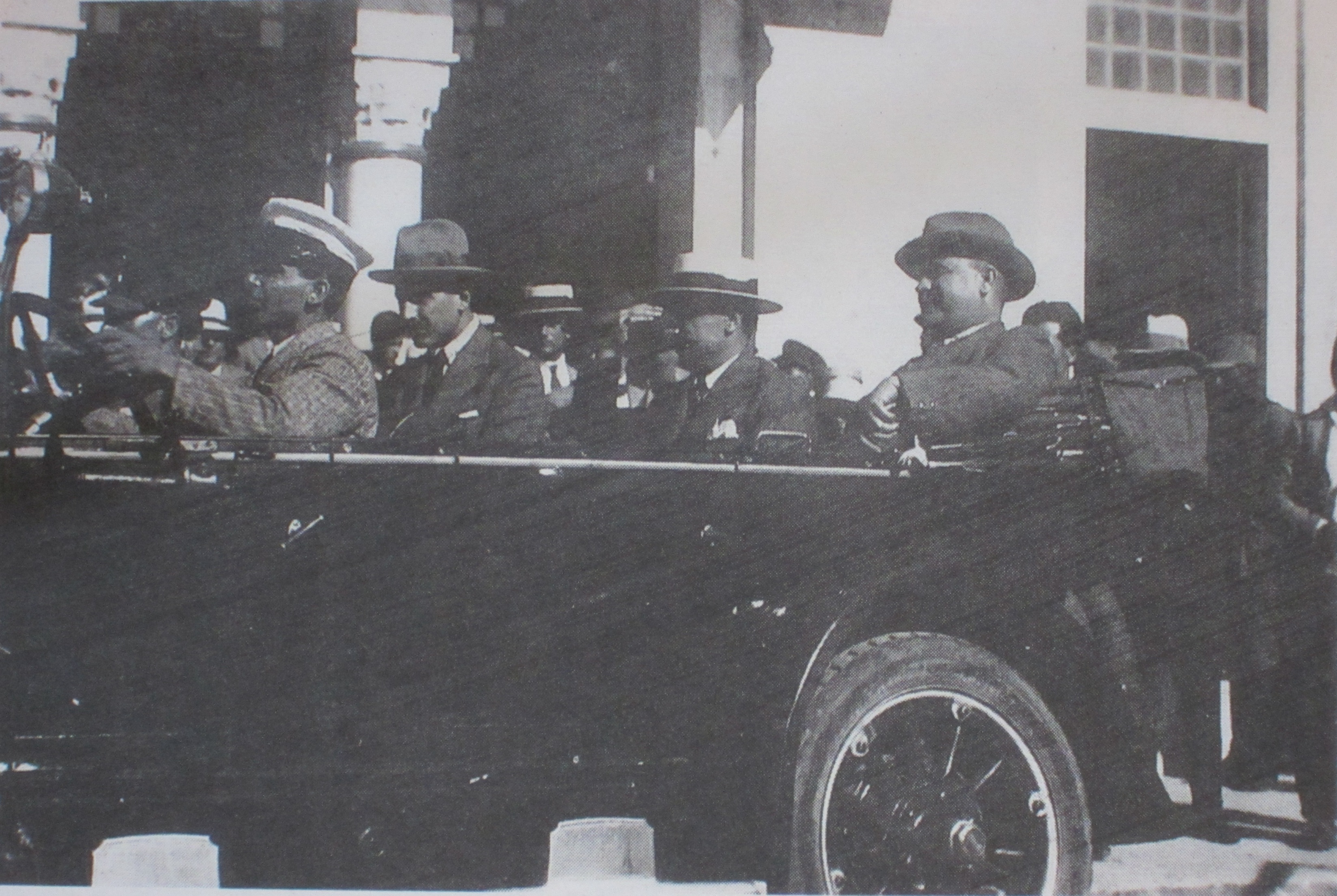
Three members of the Independence Tribunal
