= 1931 Turkish general election =

- 25 April 1931

All 317 seats in the Grand National Assembly 159 seats needed for a majority
- Turnout: 88%

	First party	Second party
Leader	Mustafa Kemal Pasha	–
Party	CHP	Independents
Last election	335	0 seats
Seats won	287	30
Seat change	▼48	▲30
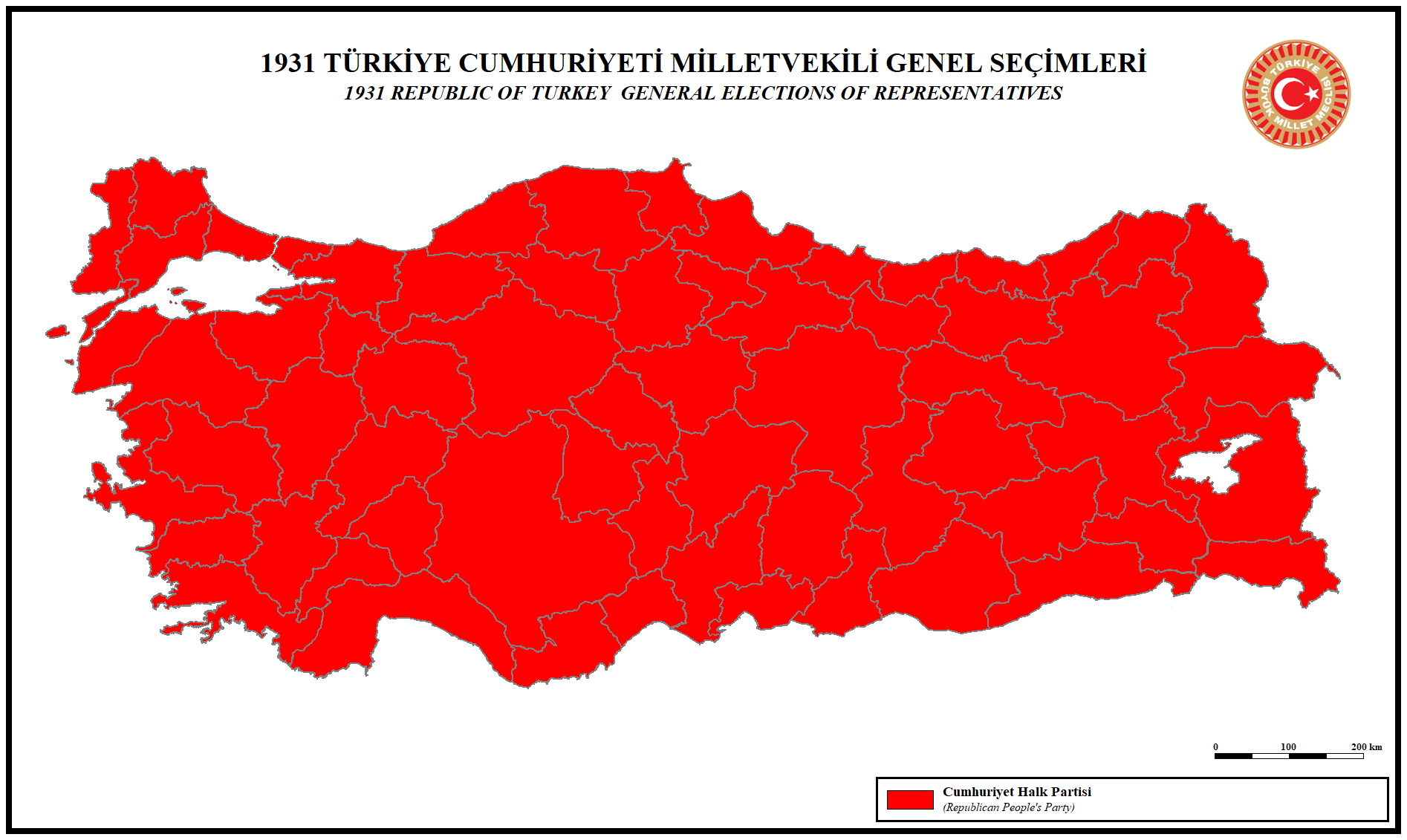
Prime Minister before election
İsmet İnönü
CHP
Elected Prime Minister
İsmet İnönü
CHP

General elections were held in Turkey in 1931. The Republican People's Party was the only party in the country at the time, as the Liberal Republican Party that had been set up the previous year had already been dissolved. Voter turnout was reported to be 88%.

== Background ==
Candidates were nominated by the Council of the Presidency of the CHP. Unlike in previous elections, candidates were sought from across the country, with a total of 1,176 nominations for the 287 candidates.

== Electoral system ==
The elections were held under the Ottoman electoral law passed in 1908, which provided for a two-stage process. In the first stage, voters elected secondary electors (one for the first 750 voters in a constituency, then one for every additional 500 voters). In the second stage the secondary electors elected the members of the Turkish Grand National Assembly.

Although the country was a one-party state at the time, thirty seats were set aside for independents. Independent candidates were required to be "republican, nationalist and sincere."
