= Ministry of Customs and Monopolies (Turkey) =

Former government ministry of Turkey

Ministry of Customs and Monopolies (Turkish: Gümrük ve Tekel Bakanlığı, prior to 1960: Gümrük ve İnhisarlar Vekaleti) was a former government ministry of Turkey between 1931 and 1983.

== History ==
The ministry was established during the formation of the 7th government of Turkey on 5 May 1931. The law of establishment was enacted on 29 December 1931. The ministry, as its name implies, had two main sections. The customs section was responsible for the customs control in the land border check points, ports and airports. The monopolies section was responsible in the state-controlled production of certain goods such as liquors, tobacco products, gunpowder, etc.

== Aftermath ==
During the formation of the 45th government of Turkey on 13 December 1983, the monopoly section was abolished and the customs section was merged into the Ministry of Finance. On 5 October 1995 at the end of the 50th government of Turkey, the word "customs" was dropped from the name of the ministry. On 6 July 2011 during the formation of the 61st government of Turkey, the customs department was included in the newly established Ministry of Customs and Trade. In the 66th government of Turkey which was founded on 18 July 2018, the ministry was named as Trade, dropping the Customs.
