= Celâl Bayar =

President of Turkey (1950–1960)

- Bayar in 1940

3rd President of Turkey
- In office 22 May 1950 – 27 May 1960
- Prime Minister: Adnan Menderes
- Preceded by: İsmet İnönü
- Succeeded by: Cemal Gürsel

3rd Prime Minister of Turkey
- In office 1 November 1937 – 25 January 1939
- President: Mustafa Kemal Atatürk; Abdülhalik Renda (Acting); İsmet İnönü
- Preceded by: İsmet İnönü
- Succeeded by: Refik Saydam
Other political positions
Party leader of the Democrat Party
In office 7 January 1946 – 9 June 1950
Preceded by	Position established
Succeeded by	Adnan Menderes
Member of the Grand National Assembly
In office 28 June 1923 – 27 May 1960
Constituency	Izmir (1923, 1927, 1931, 1935, 1939, 1943, 1946); Istanbul (1950, 1954, 1957)

Personal details
- Born: Mahmud Celâleddin; 16 May 1883 Umurbey, Gemlik, Ottoman Empire
- Died: 22 August 1986 (aged 103) Istanbul, Turkey
- Party: Democrat Party (1946–1961); Republican People's Party (1923–1945); Committee of Union and Progress (1908–1922)
- Spouse: Reşide Bayar (m. 1903; died 1962)
- Children: 3, including Nilüfer

Mahmut Celâlettin "Celâl" Bayar (16 May 1883 – 22 August 1986) was a Turkish economist and politician who was the president of Turkey from 1950 to 1960. He previously served as the prime minister of Turkey from 1937 to 1939.

Bayar was an ally of Talât's in the Committee of Union and Progress, establishing its İzmir and Bursa branches. He organized the 1914 Greek deportations. Following the declaration of the Republic, he founded much of Turkey's early financial institutions, including the country's first bank, İş Bankası. An advocate of liberal economic policies, Mustafa Kemal Atatürk appointed Bayar prime minister in 1937 to liberalize the economy, until he resigned in 1939 under Atatürk's successor -and his political rival- İsmet İnönü.

Until 1945, he was a member of Republican People's Party (CHP) which was the sole legal party. In 1946, he founded the center-right Democrat Party along with Adnan Menderes, Fuat Köprülü and Refik Koraltan. This began Turkey's multiparty period, which still goes on to this day. A peaceful transfer of power from the CHP to DP happened in the 1950 elections, after which Bayar was elected president. He was re-elected in 1954 and 1957, serving for 10 years as president. In that period, Menderes was his prime minister. Close relations were established with the Western Bloc, and in 1952 Turkey joined NATO. He was criticized for supporting the DP's illegal actions as head of state.

Bayar was overthrown in the 1960 coup d'etat. He was prosecuted for treason in the Yassıada trials for encouraging authoritarianism and corruption as president. He was given the death penalty, but due to his advanced age his sentence was commuted to life-imprisonment. He was released in 1966 after a general amnesty to former DP members. He advocated for the restoration of rights of former politicians associated with the Democrat Party following his release.

He is considered to be the longest-lived former head of state and was the longest-lived state leader until 8 December 2008 (when he was surpassed by Chau Sen Cocsal Chhum). Celâl Bayar died on 22 August 1986 at the age of 103 after a brief illness.

== Early years ==
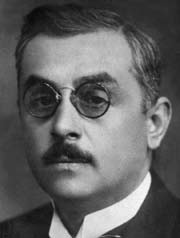
Younger Celâleddin

Mahmud Celâleddin (Bayar after 1934) was born on 16 May 1883 at Umurbey, a village of Gemlik, Bursa, the third son of Abdullah Fehmi Efendi, religious leader and teacher who migrated from Lom, Ottoman Bulgaria as a muhacir, after the Bulgarians ethnically cleansed the Muslim population there during the 1877–1878 Russo-Turkish war. His older brothers were Behzat and Asım. He first worked at the Gemlik Régie Company and in the court clerk’s office, and later at the Ziraat Bank in Bursa. Following this, he took up a position at Deutsche Orientbank. During his years in Bursa, he attended courses at the Collège Français de l'Assomption, managed by French priests, as well as silk production training at Dârütta‘lîm-i Harîr.

== In the CUP ==
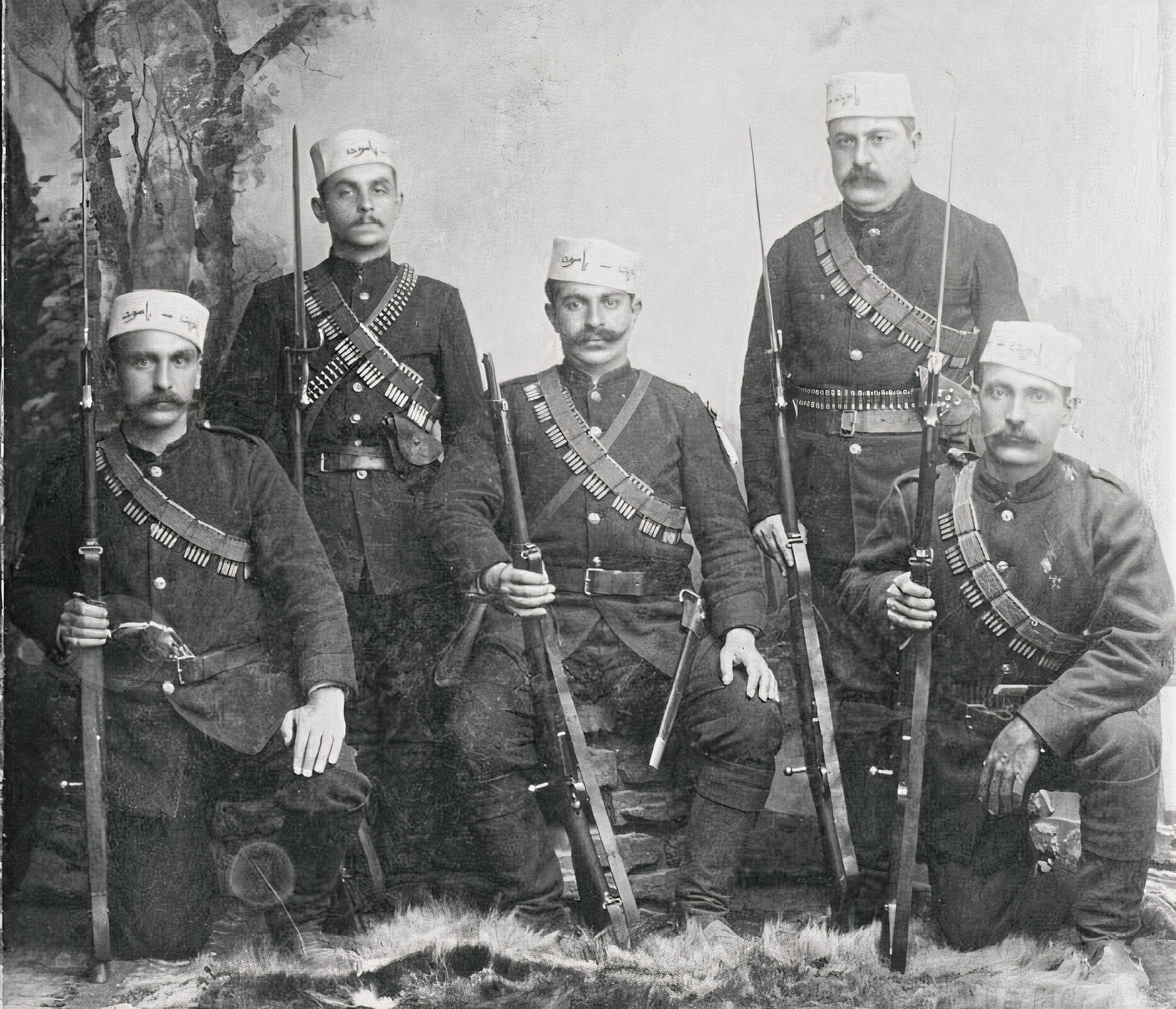
Celâl Bey, who joined the volunteer units in 1909 to suppress the rebellion of Abdul Hamit II supporters that emerged after the 1908 Revolution organized by the Young Turks

In 1907, Bayar joined an unofficial branch of the Committee of Union and Progress (CUP) in Bursa. After the Second Constitutional Era was proclaimed following the Young Turk Revolution, he served as the secretary-general of a newly founded local branch of the organization, with instructions to organize Unionist infrastructure in Anatolia. Bayar formed a Unionist militia in Bursa with the intention to join up with Mahmud Şevket Pasha's Action Army during the 31 March Incident. He got as far as Mudanya but by then the revolt was crushed. He founded the İzmir branch of Union and Progress in 1911. Bayar established an organization and CUP mouthpiece known as Halkın Doğru (True to the People), where he wrote pro-CUP articles under the pseudonym Turgut Alp. He was a participant of the 1913 Ottoman coup d'état, and witnessed the murder of the Minister of War Nâzım Pasha.

Well connected with financial circles, Bayar played an important role in Unionist Millî İktisat (National Economy) policies. He was a member of the Special Organization and worked alongside Eşref Sencer Kuşçubaşı to organize the 1914 Greek deportations in order to reduce the Ottoman Greek population on the Aegean coast. He initiated the opening of İzmir Girls' High School, the Şimendifer Vocational School in Basmahane, and a library in İzmir. Bayar also played an important role in the creation of the İzmir based sports club Altay S.K.

== War of Independence ==
Following the Armistice of Mudros, which ended World War I for Turkey, he was tried and acquitted as a war criminal at the İzmir Martial Law Court. However, when the allied powers continued advancing into Ottoman territory despite the armistice, various nationalist organizations known as Defence of National Rights Associations were founded. Bayar established the Association for the Cancellation of İzmir's Annexation (İzmir Redd-i İlhak Cemiyeti) and the Association for the Defence of Ottoman İzmir (İzmir Müdâfaa-i Hukuku Osmaniye Cemiyeti). Bayar fled into the mountains after hearing rumors of an impending allied occupation of İzmir and finding out his name was on an arrest list from İstanbul. Once İzmir was occupied, he cooperated with the national resistance fighters in the Söke region. On the side of the resistance, he participated in the Battle of Aydın against the Greeks. With the decision of the Balıkesir Congress, he was appointed to the command of the Akhisar front regiment.

Bayar was elected to the Ottoman Parliament as deputy of Saruhan (today Manisa) in the 1919 election, where he gave speeches denouncing the palace's indifference to allied occupation. Following the occupation of Constantinople, he fled to Ankara to join Mustafa Kemal (Atatürk) Pasha and the Turkish Independence Movement. While on the road the Anzavur rebellion threatened Bursa, so Mustafa Kemal asked Bayar to stay in Bursa to fend the rebels off. He was briefly a member of the Green Army Organization and the Turkish Communist Party, a foax communist party set up by Mustafa Kemal to counter the influence of the Communist Party of Turkey.

He became the deputy of Bursa in the newly established Grand National Assembly of Turkey. The same year, he served as deputy minister of the economy and in 1921 he was appointed as the minister of the economy. He led the negotiation commission during Çerkes Ethem's uprising. In 1922, Bayar was a member of the Turkish delegation during the Lausanne Peace Conference as an advisor to İsmet İnönü.

== One-party period ==
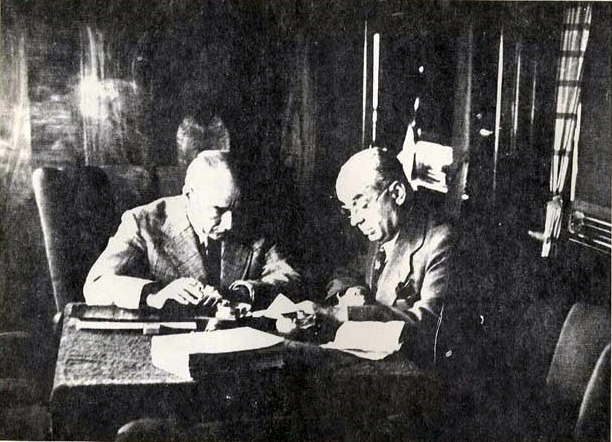
Mustafa Kemal Atatürk and Bayar on 12 November 1937

Bayar was elected as a member of the Association for the Defence of National Rights of Anatolia and Rumelia in the 1923 election, serving as a deputy of İzmir in the Parliament. The organization soon renamed itself the Republican People's Party (CHP) and continued a one party state started by the CUP in 1913. On 6 March 1924 Celâl Bayar was appointed Minister of Exchange Construction and Settlement (until 7 July 1924). Bayar was influential in determining the economic policy of the regime as a result of being in Mustafa Kemal's close circle during this period. A policy of state supported capitalism was pursued. On 26 August 1924, Atatürk commissioned Bayar to found a national bank, which resulted in the foundation of İşbank in Ankara by using as capital the gold bullion sent by the Muslims in India to support the Turkish War of Independence. The Aşar tax was abolished, land was distributed, the Teşvik-i Sanayi Kanunu (Industry Incentive Law) was enacted, railway construction was accelerated, and the Central Bank was established. The effects of the Great Depression caused this more "liberal" policy to be replaced by statism.

During his teneurship as economic minister (between 1932 and 1937), Bayar became one of the leading advocates of statism. Bayar understood statism as an effective tool in the creation of a nationalist and capitalist economy. Bayar's term as economic minister saw an increase in regulatory interventions in the economy by the state, and high levels of industrialization. For this purpose, the First Five-Year Industry Plan was enacted. Institutions such as Sümerbank and Etibank were established to finance industrialization. Nationalizations, protectionist economic policies, and many state monopolies were created. However İsmet İnönü was in favor of an even stricter statism, and could not fully agree with his economic policies.

On 1 November 1937 Atatürk appointed Bayar as Prime Minister of the 9th Government of Turkey after İnönü left the government. During the Bayar government, the Denizbank Law, which continued the statist approach, was enacted and several nationalizations were made. However there was no significant change in the composition of the government nor a significant change in economic policy. He continued to serve as prime minister when Atatürk died and İnönü became president in 1938 (10th government of Turkey). Differences of opinion with İnönü led him to resign from the premiership on 25 January 1939. The rivalry between İnönü and Bayar became one of the most significant rivalries in Turkish history.

== Creation of the Democrat Party ==
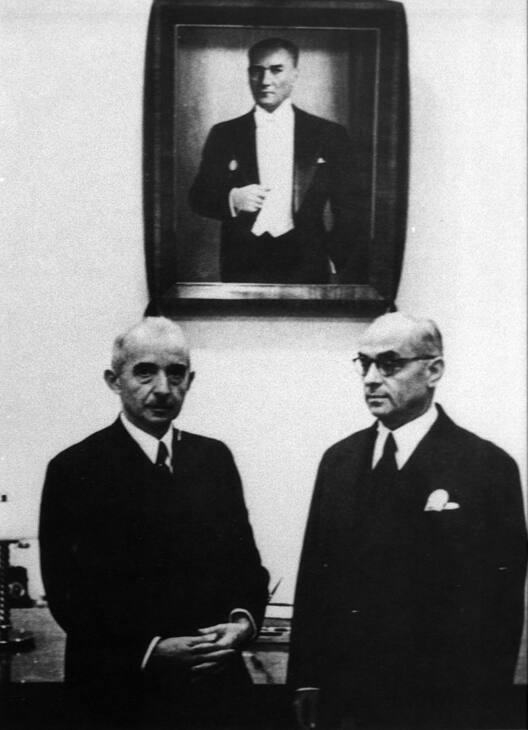
İsmet İnönü and Bayar in 1938

During the Second World War, Bayar's political activity was limited; though he was re-elected as a member of parliament, he shunned from the cabinet. After 1943, he took a moderate opposition to the government.

The end of World War II brought about a global wave of democracy, which resumed the power struggle in the one-party regime between the two versions of statism espoused by İnönü and Bayar. Opposition to the CHP administration surfaced during the voting of the 1945 Budget Law; Bayar, Adnan Menderes, Fuat Köprülü, Refik Koraltan, and Emin Sazak voted against the bill in the voting held for the seven-month budget of the Şükrü Saracoğlu government. The division within the party became more evident on 7 June 1945, when Bayar, Menderes, Koraltan and Köprülü submitted a motion to the chairmanship of the CHP Parliamentary Group asking for "amendments to the Party's statute and some laws", known as the "motion with four signatures". The motion demanded political liberalization in the country and in the party, but was soundly rejected by the members of the CHP Central Council. On 21 September 1945 the CHP Council unanimously expelled Köprülü and Menderes from the party, and after a short time Koraltan. Bayar resigned from his parliamentary position in September 1945 and from the CHP in December 1945. On 7 January 1946 the four founded the Democrat Party (DP) and Bayar was elected as the leader of the party. The party program of the DP featured Bayar style approaches to economic policy, political democratization, decreasing the power of the bureaucracy, and encouraging private initiative while maintaining the principle of statism.

DP achieved relative success against CHP in 1946 election and elected 62 deputies. Bayar was also elected as a deputy from İstanbul. Between 1946 and 1950, as the leader of the opposition, he led a sometimes hardened opposition to his former party. At the first congress of the DP in January 1947, Bayar demanded that the Election Law be amended, so that the same person cannot be both president and party chairman, and that other antidemocratic laws should be abolished. Although the DP was supported by religious circles who were dissatisfied with the effective secularism policy of the one-party period, Bayar's Kemalist background was seen as an assurance of the party's commitment to secularism. But he was among the moderates in the DP regarding the opposition to the CHP. The "extremists" later left the party and founded the Nation Party (which would be closed in 1953).

== Presidency ==
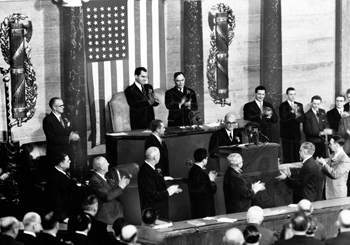
President Bayar receives a standing ovation after his speech before a joint session of Congress. Behind him are Vice-President Nixon and Speaker of the House Sam Rayburn (1954).

In the first free elections in Turkish history, the Democrats won the 1950 general election with a 53% popular mandate. Though Bayar didn't aspire to become president, parliament elected him as president of Turkey on 22 May 1950. He was the first president of the Republic without a military background. He subsequently resigned from the DP leadership, though regularly discussed policy with his prime minister and DP leader successor, Menderes. He participated in election rallies walking with a cane with an engraving of the DP logo. He was re-elected in 1954 and 1957, serving for 10 years as president.

During Bayar's presidency relations with the Western bloc improved and after the Turkish Straits Crisis, Turkey joined the Korean War in 1951 and then NATO in February 1952. Bayar became the first president of Turkey to make an official visit to the United States in 1954. In a speech at a DP rally in İstanbul before the 1957 election, he announced that "Turkey will become a "Little America" in 30 years.

During ten-years of Democrat rule, Turkish society went through deep transformations. An inflationary economic policy encouraging private enterprise was followed, though the role of the state was not reduced. Political participation increased, leading to a large cadre of Anatolians entering politics and business. Although secularism was not abandoned, the explicitly secularist policy of the one-party regime was abandoned. In the second half of the 1950s, with the impact of the economic depression, the DP pursued increasingly authoritarian policies and put heavy pressure on the opposition. It was under his presidency that the İstanbul Pogrom took place on 6–7 September 1955. Bayar also had a decisive influence in encouraging authoritarianism by the Democrats.

== 1960 coup and imprisonment ==
On 27 May 1960 the armed forces staged a coup d'etat. Bayar resisted the officers who came to arrest him at Çankaya Mansion and then tried to commit suicide by holding the pistol in his jacket pocket to his temple. However, the soldiers were more agile than the 77-year-old Bayar and managed to take the gun from him. Bayar was arrested along with other Democrats, and was tried at the High Court of Justice in Yassıada on charges of treason and violating the constitution. He tried to commit suicide again with a waist belt while he was imprisoned in Yassıada but failed. He was sentenced to death on 15 September 1961. The National Unity Committee approved the death sentence for Menderes, Zorlu, and Polatkan, but the punishment for Bayar and other twelve party members was commuted to life imprisonment. Bayar was transferred from Yassıada to Kayseri Prison. Under pressure from ex-DP supporters, Bayar's sentence was suspended by the government for six months due to his health issues and he was released on 22 March 1963. Bayar came to Ankara the next day, and was greeted by a large convoy and crowd. This enthusiastic welcome caused chaos in the streets, with protests going so far as vandalizing the headquarters of the successor of the DP, the Justice Party, Bayar's house, and the newspaper headquarters of Yeni İstanbul. Concerns arose that the Justice Party would be shut down. The decision was made to postpone Bayar's release from prison. After being under surveillance in Ankara Hospital for 6 months, he was sent back to Kayseri Prison (5 October 1963), although there was no change in his health status.

He remained in Kayseri Prison until 7 November 1964, when he was released for health reasons (he had suffered a heart attack the day before). He was pardoned by president Cevdet Sunay on 8 July 1966. With a new amnesty law enacted by the Justice Party government on 8 August 1966, all former DP members, including those sentenced to life imprisonment, were freed.

== Later years and death ==
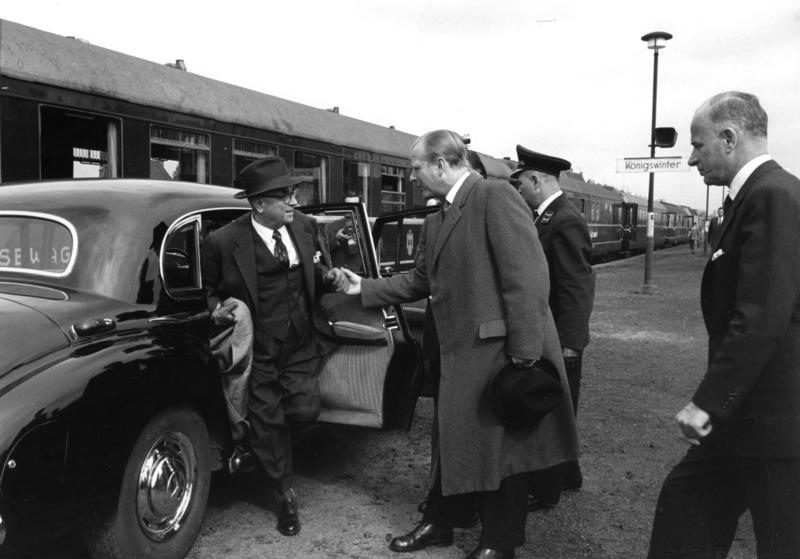
Bayar during a state visit to West Germany in 1958

Restoring ex-Democrats full political rights was a divisive issue in Turkey during the 1960s. After being pardoned, Bayar worked to restore the political rights of former DP members. He held a historic meeting with his political rival İnönü on 14 May 1969 that lead to CHP passing a constitutional amendment which returned suspended rights to former DP members. This amendment offended Sunay and the army, and also divided the Justice Party, resulting in the birth of the Democratic Party in 1970 (which Bayar supported).

Full political rights were restored to Bayar in 1974, but he declined his automatic invitation to become a life member of the Senate due to being a past head of state, on the grounds that one can represent the people only if elected. When a large group of Democratic Party members returned to the Justice Party after the amnesty was granted, Bayar also supported the Justice Party in the 1975 Senate partial elections; He took to the podium together with Süleyman Demirel and spoke at a Justice Party rally held in Bursa. He supported the 1980 military junta and the 1982 Constitution. He turned 100 on 16 May 1983.

He died of heart failure at Dr. Siyami Ersek Thoracic and Cardiovascular Surgery Training and Research Hospital on 22 August 1986, at age 103. There was debate over burying Bayar in Anıtkabir like his old rival İsmet İnönü was, this was advocated by Motherland Party leader Turgut Özal and SHP leader Erdal İnönü, İsmet's son. However President Kenan Evren objected and Bayar was buried in his hometown of Umurbey after a state ceremony in Ankara, at which Evren was in attendance. From 24 April 1978, when former Paraguayan President Federico Chávez died, until his own death Bayar was the world's oldest living former head of state.

=== Awards and legacy ===
In 1954, Bayar was awarded the Grand Cross Special Class of the Order of Merit of the Federal Republic of Germany (German: Sonderstufe des Großkreuzes des Verdienstordens der Bundesrepublik Deutschland). 27 January 1954 Bayar received the Legion of Merit Award from the President of the United States, as a result of Turkey's participation in the Korean War. He also received the Order of the Yugoslav Star. In 1954, Bayar was awarded an honorary doctorate by the University of Belgrade. In 1958, the Free University of Berlin awarded him an honorary doctorate. The Celal Bayar University, which was established in 1992 in Manisa, is named after him.

=== Family ===
Celâl Bayar married Reşide in 1903. They had three children: Refii (1904–1940), Turgut (1911–1983), and Nilüfer Bayar (1921–2024). Refii Bayar was the General Manager of "Milli Reasurans," a reinsurance company, from 1929 to 1939, was the founder of "Halk Evleri", an educational government entity in Istanbul, and was a journalist and published the Halk newspaper between 1939 and 1941 with Cemal Kutay.

Nilüfer married Ahmet İhsan Gürsoy (1913–2008), who was the Kütahya deputy for the Democrat Party between 1946 and 1960, the Bursa deputy for the Justice Party between 1965 and 1969 and İstanbul deputy for the Democratic Party between 1973 and 1975 and then for the Justice Party between 1975 and 1980.

== Sources ==
- Bayar, Celâl (1967), Ben de Yazdım, vol. 4, Istanbul: Baha Matbaasi

== Bibliography ==
- Kayseri Cezaevi Günlüğü (Kayseri Prison Diary), Yapı Kredi yayınları/Tarih dizisi.
- Ben De Yazdım – Milli Mücadeleye Gidiş (And so I wrote – Going to the War of National Independence) 8 volumes., Sabah kitapları/Türkiyeden dizisi, 1965–1972.

Political offices
Preceded by İsmet İnönü	Prime Minister of Turkey; 1937–1939	Succeeded by Refik Saydam
Preceded by İsmet İnönü	President of Turkey; 1950–1960	Succeeded by Cemal Gürsel
Party political offices
New political party	Leader of the Democratic Party; 1946–1950	Succeeded by Adnan Menderes
Records
Preceded by Isidro Ayora	Oldest living state leader 1978–1986	Succeeded by Willem Drees
