= Ministry of Industry and Technology =

Government ministry of Turkey

- Sanayi ve Teknoloji Bakanlığı

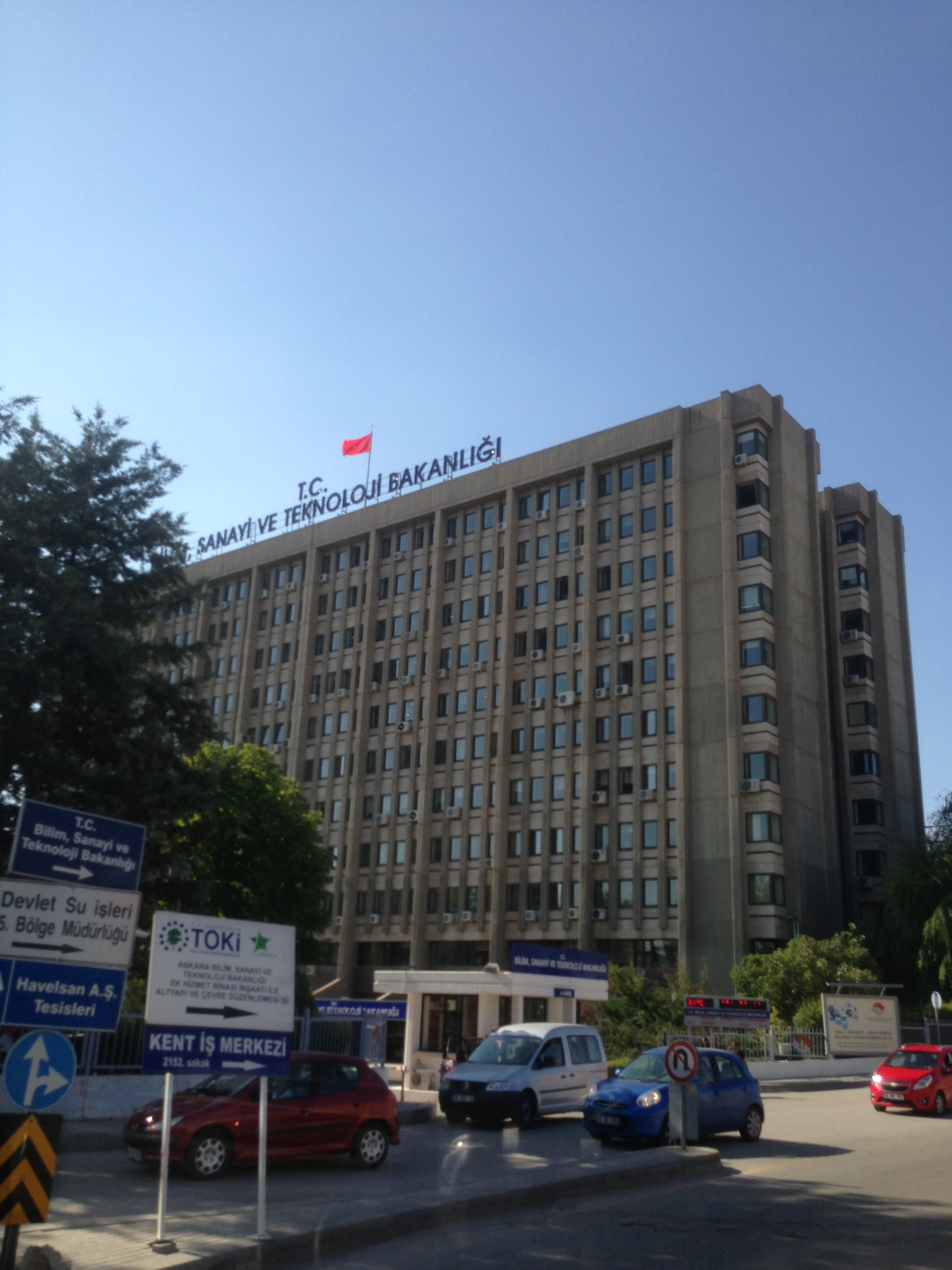
- Headquarters of Ministry of Industry and Technology in Ankara, Turkey.

Agency overview
- Formed: 1984
- Preceding agency: Ministry of Science Industry and Technology
- Jurisdiction: Government of Turkey
- Headquarters: Ankara
- Minister responsible: Mehmet Fatih Kacır
- Deputy Ministers responsible: Ahmet Yozgatlıgil; Çetin Ali Dönmez; Oruç Baba İnan; Zekeriya Coştu
- Website: www.sanayi.gov.tr/en/home

The Ministry of Industry and Technology (Turkish: Sanayi ve Teknoloji Bakanlığı) is a government ministry office of the Republic of Turkey, responsible for industrial and commercial affairs in Turkey. The ministry is headed by Mehmet Fatih Kacır.

== Ministers ==
- Mustafa Varank (10 July 2018 – 4 June 2023)
- Mehmet Fatih Kacır (since 4 June 2023)
