= 1942 in Turkey =

- Centuries: 20th; 21st
- Decades: 1920s; 1930s; 1940s; 1950s; 1960s
- See also: List of years in Turkey

Events in the year 1942 in Turkey.

== Parliament ==
- 6th Parliament of Turkey

== Incumbents ==
- President – İsmet İnönü
- Prime Minister

Refik Saydam (up to 7 July)
Ahmet Fikri Tüzer (acting, 7 July – 9 July)
Şükrü Saracoğlu (from 9 July)

== Ruling party and the main opposition ==
- Ruling party – Republican People's Party (CHP)

== Cabinet ==
12th government of Turkey (up to 9 July) 13th government of Turkey (from 9 July)

== Events ==
- 16 March – British war planes bombarded Milas. They claimed this event as an error.
- 8 April – Exchange of wounded British and Italian soldiers in İzmir
- 7 July – Upon Refik Saydam’s death on duty, Ahmet Fikri Tüzer acted as the prime minister for two days
- 14 July – Atılay tragedy. Submarine Atılay sank because of a naval mine in the Strait of Çanakkale (Dardanelles)
- 11 November – Wealth tax (varlık vergisi) an incontestable tax to support the treasury against World War II expenditures
- 20 December – 1942 Niksar–Erbaa earthquake

== Births ==
- 1 January – Vural Öger, businessman
- 14 March – Emin Çölaşan, journalist
- 31 May – Gündüz Tekin Onay, footballer and coach
- 12 June – Tülay Tuğcu, chief judge
- 17 June – Doğu Perinçek, politician
- 2 July – Ahmet Türk, politician
- 9 August – Erman Şener, film critic, screenwriter
- 22 August, Uğur Mumcu, academic, journalist
- 30 August, Zafer Ergin, actor
- 18 September – Şenes Erzik, vice president of the Union of European Football Associations (UEFA)
- 13 October – Aykut Oray, actor
- 23 December -Süha Arın, film director

== Deaths ==
- 7 July – Refik Saydam (born in 1881), prime minister on duty
- 9 May – Vedat Tek (born in 1873), architect
- 16 August – Ahmet Fikri Tüzer (born in 1878), government minister and former acting prime minister
- 8 September – Rıza Nur (born in 1879), politician
- 16 November – Ömer Lütfi Argeşo (born in 1880), politician

== Gallery ==
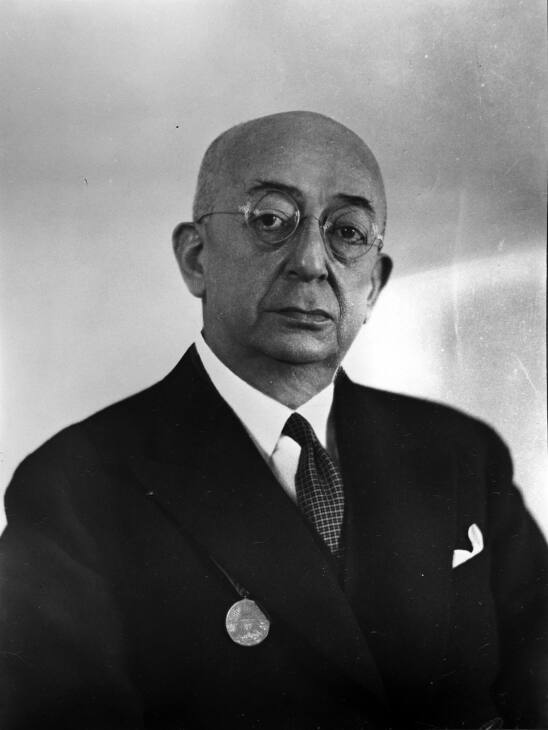
Refik Saydam

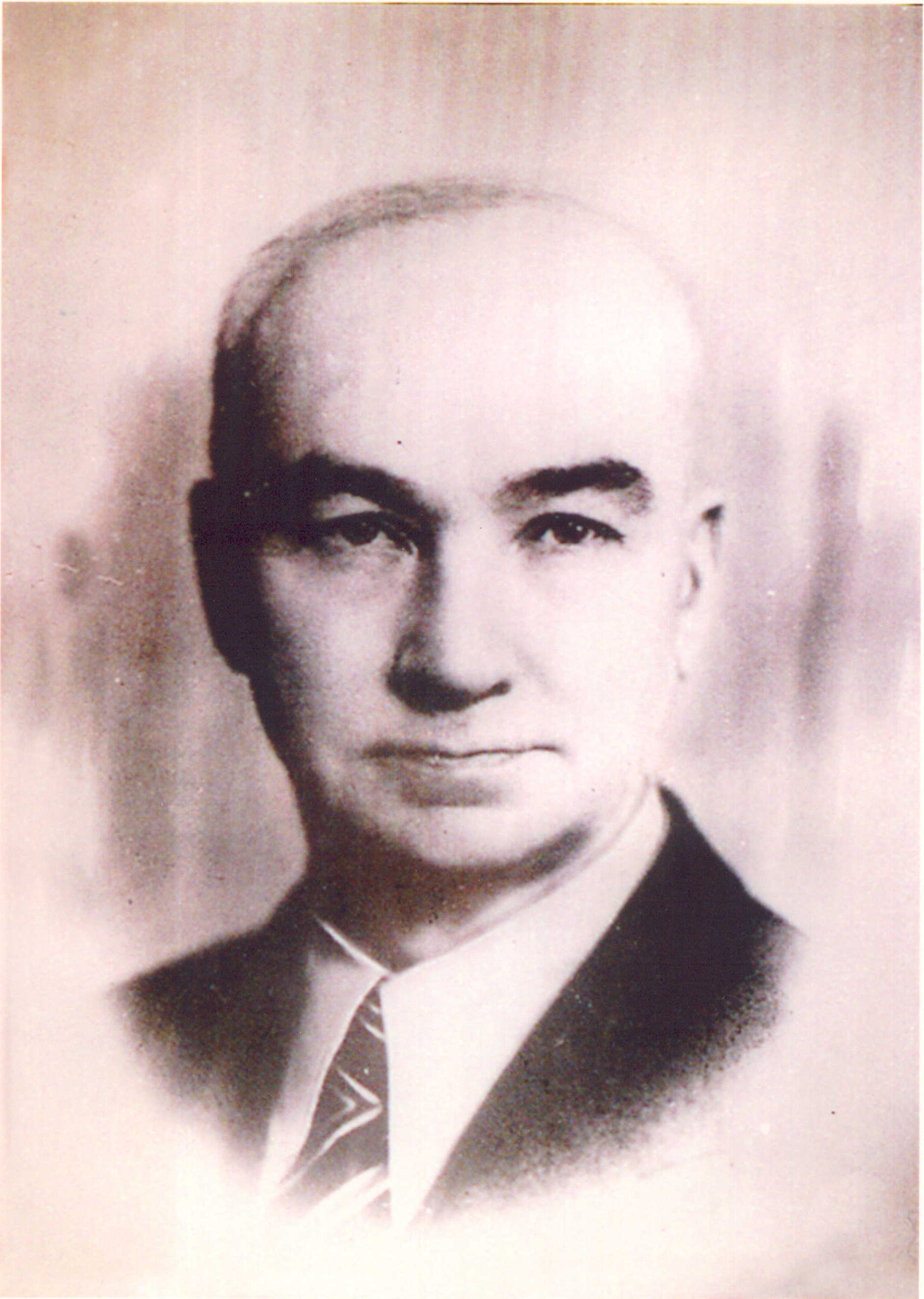
Ahmet Fikri Tüzer

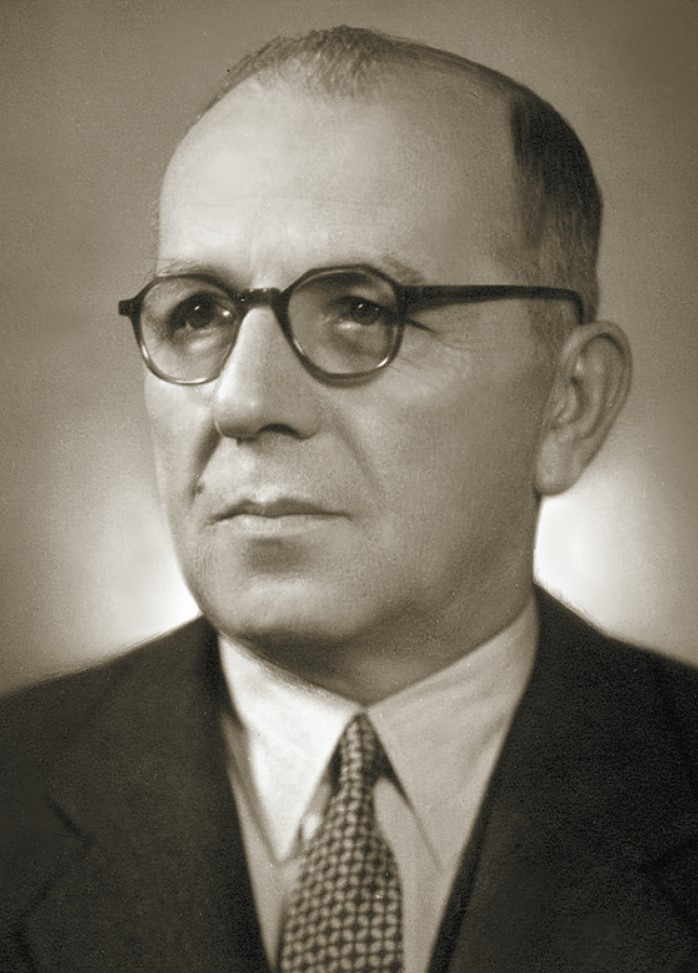
Şükrü Saracoğlu

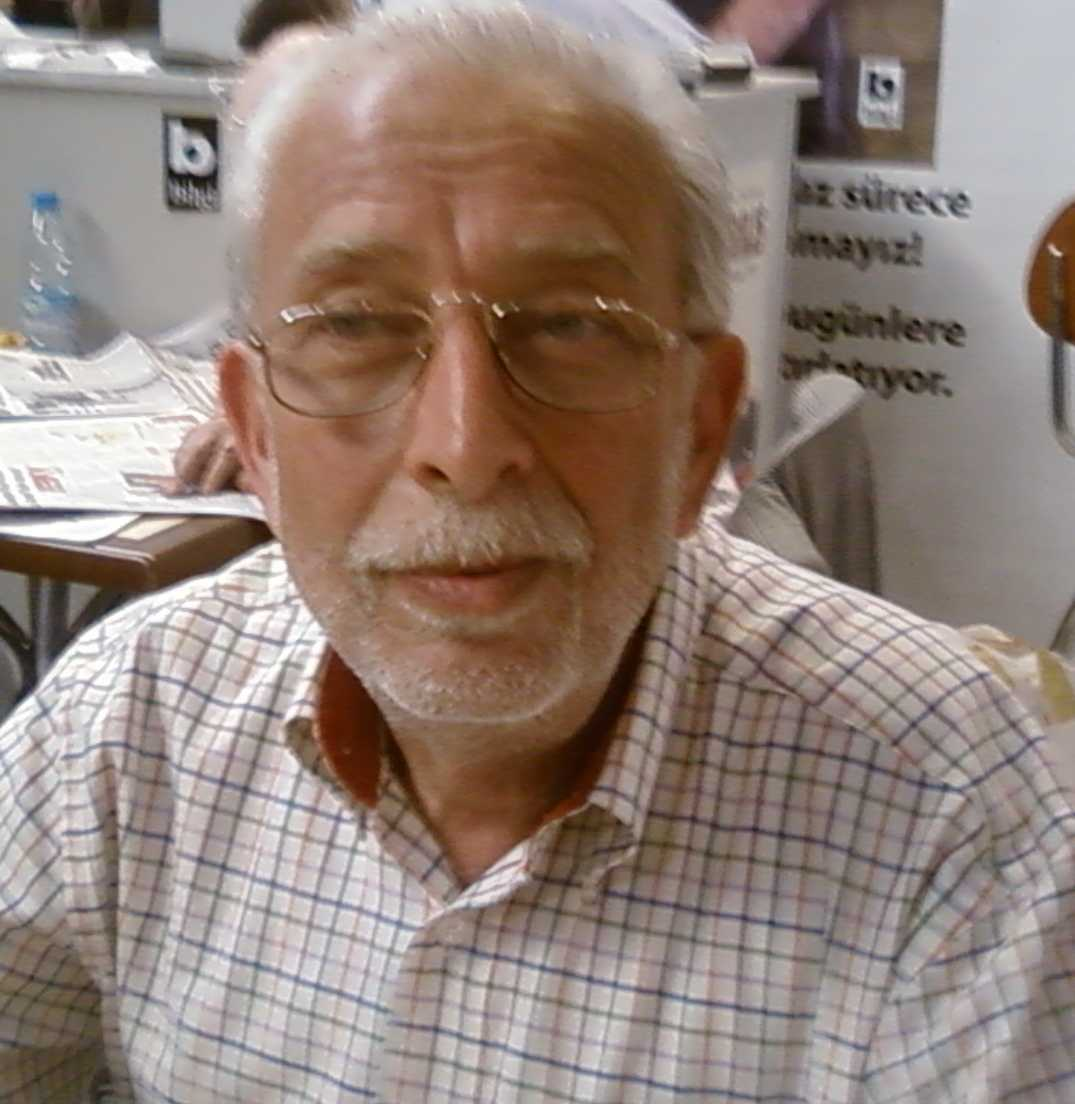
Emin Çölaşan

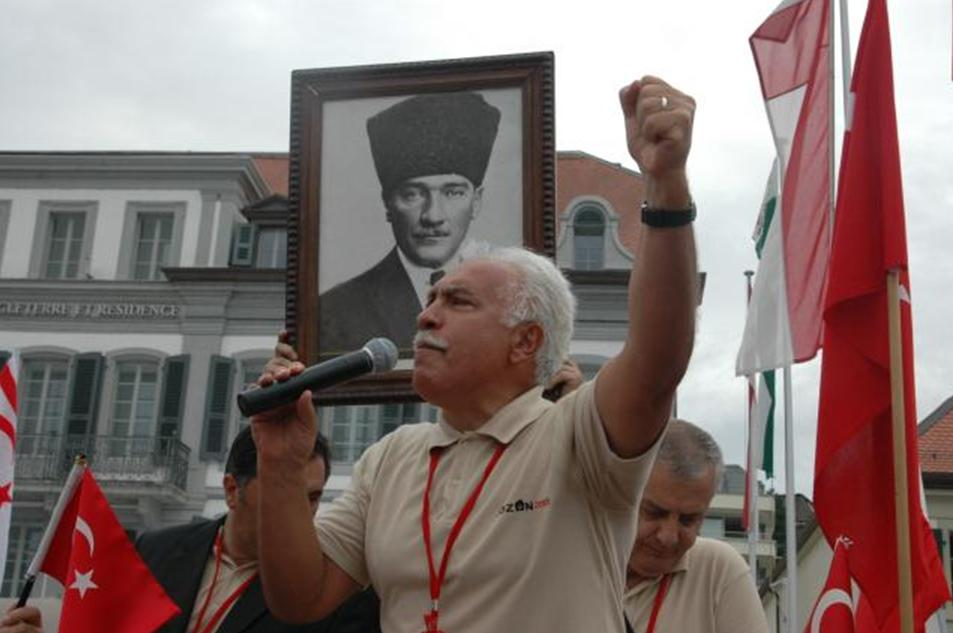
Doğu Perinçek

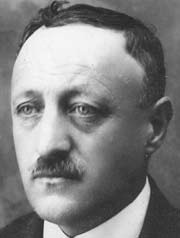
Rıza Nur

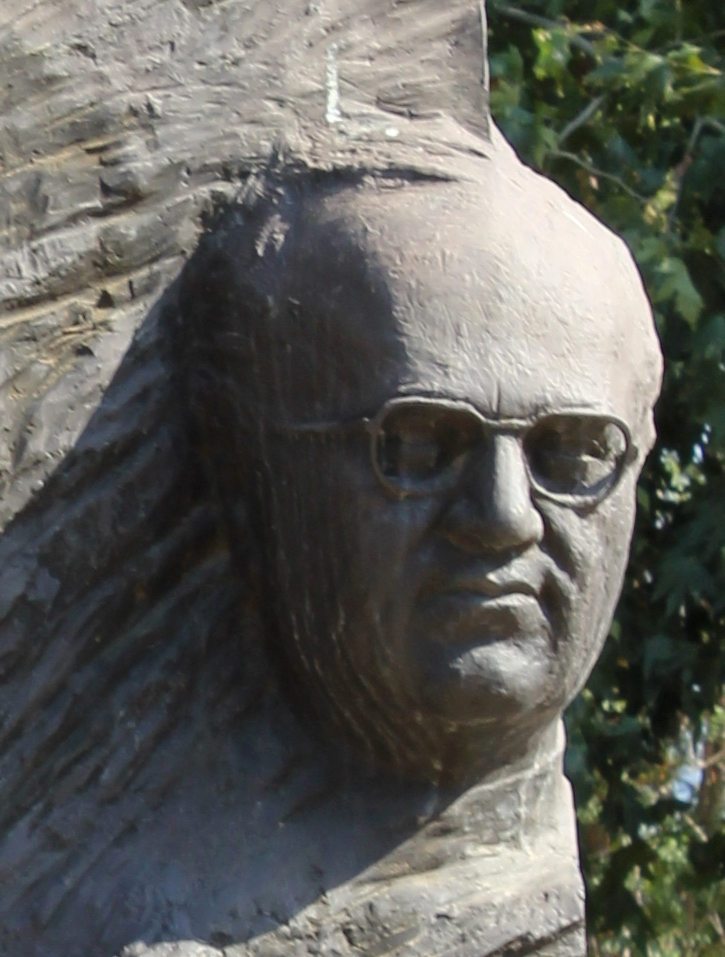
Uğur Mumcu
