= 1943 in Turkey =

- Centuries: 20th; 21st
- Decades: 1920s; 1930s; 1940s; 1950s; 1960s
- See also: List of years in Turkey

Events in the year 1943 in Turkey.

== Parliament ==
- 6th Parliament of Turkey (up to 8 March)
- 7th Parliament of Turkey

== Incumbents ==
- President – İsmet İnönü
- Prime Minister – Şükrü Saracoğlu

== Ruling party and the main opposition ==
- Ruling party – Republican People's Party (CHP)

== Cabinet ==
13th government of Turkey (up to 9 Merch) 14th government of Turkey (from 9 March)

== Events ==
- 30 January – Yenice Conference, a meeting between İsmet İnönü and Winston Churchill in which the British side tried to persuade Turkey to join war.
- 23 February - The architect of the Genocide Talat Pasha's remnants were transported from Germany to Turkey and buried in Abide-i Hurriyet Cemetery (Monument of Liberty), Istanbul.
- 28 February – General Elections
- 21 March – Exchange of wounded British and Italian soldiers in Mersin
- 20 June – 1943 Adapazarı–Hendek earthquake
- 10 September – Fire in the Grand Bazaar (Kapalıçarşı) 202 shops were destroyed
- 26 November – 1943 Tosya–Ladik earthquake
- 4 December – İsmet İnönü met with Winston Churchill and Dwight D. Eisenhower in Cairo

== Births ==
- 2 January – Janet Akyüz Mattei, astronomer
- 2 January – Filiz Akın, actress
- 2 January – Barış Manço, singer
- 5 January – Atilla Özdemiroğlu, musician
- 2 February – Özden Örnek, admiral
- 3 February – Asaf Savaş Akat, economist
- 9 February – Cemal Kamacı, boxer
- 13 February – Şevket Altuğ, actor
- 18 April – Zeki Alasya, actor
- 20 April - Abdullah Kiğılı, businessman
- 29 April – İlker Başbuğ, chief of staff
- 13 May – Sumru Çörtoğlu, lawyer
- 13 August – Bilgesu Erenus, playwright and activist
- 19 September – Murat Karayalçın, politician
- 12 December – Fatma Girik, actress

== Deaths ==
- 13 February – Neyyire Neyir, actress
- 7 May – Fethi Okyar, former prime minister (3rd government of Turkey)
- 4 July – Cevat Abbas Gürer – politician

== Gallery ==
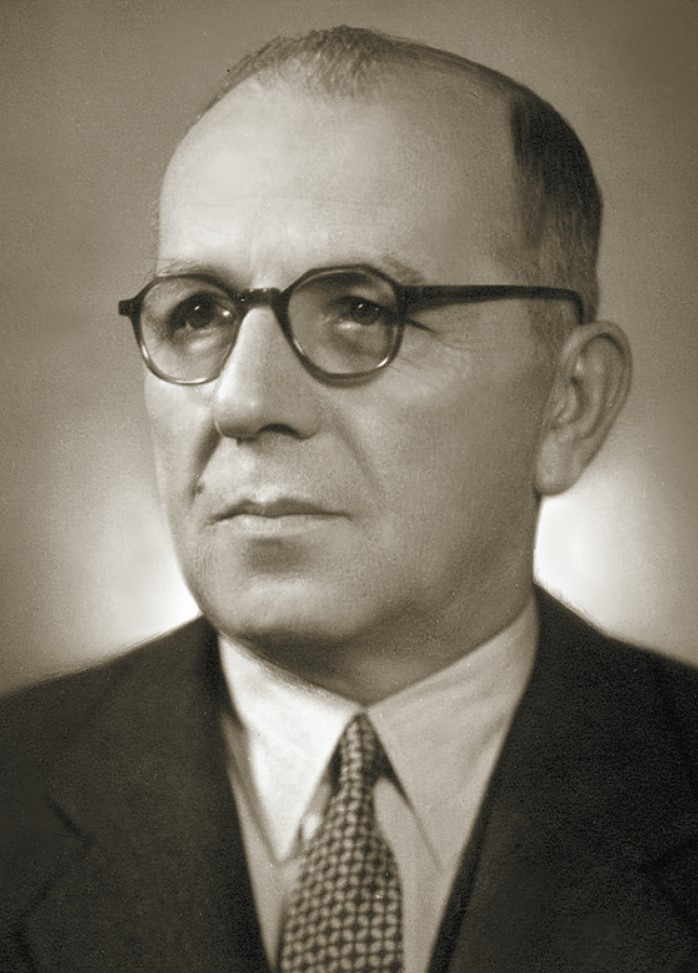
Şükrü Saracoğlu

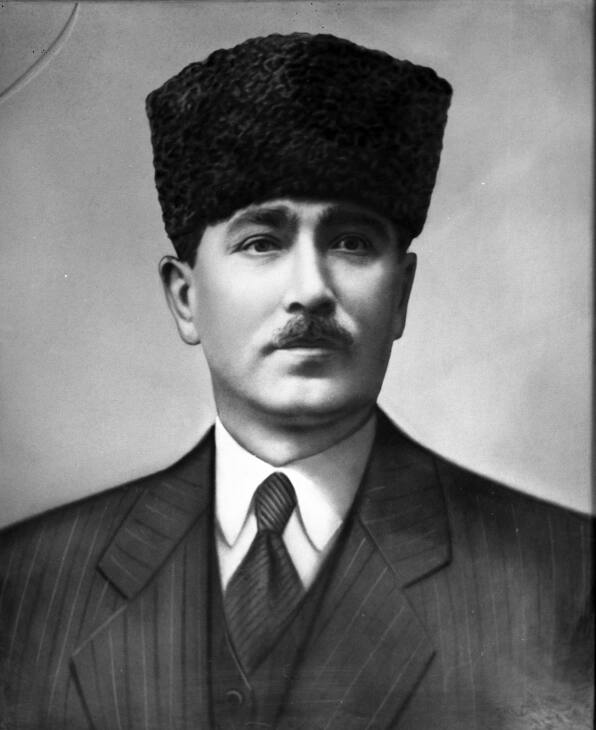
Fethi Okyar

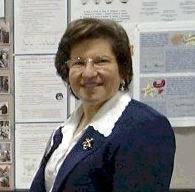
Janet Akyüz Mattel

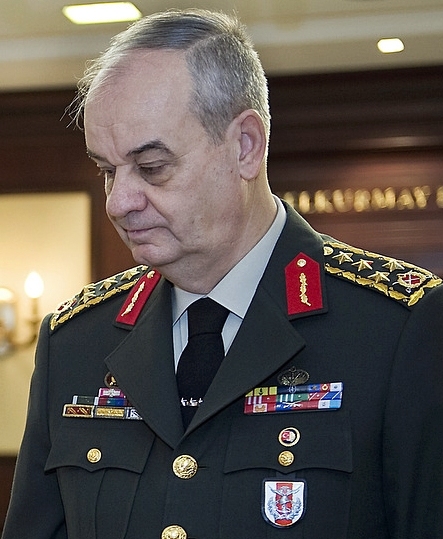
İlker Başbuğ

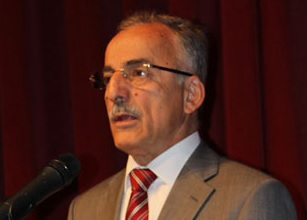
Murat Karayalçın

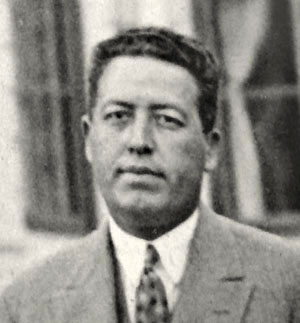
Cevat Abbas Gürer
