= Remziye =

Remziye is a Turkish feminine given name. Notable people with the name include:

- Remziye Bakır (born 1997), Turkish footballer
- Remziye Hisar (1902–1992), Turkish academic and chemist
- Remziye Sıvacı (born 1965), Turkish politician
- Remziye Tarsinova, Soviet and Ukrainian dancer
