= Cemal Akçin =

Turkish politician

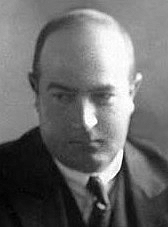

Member of the Grand National Assembly
- Constituency: Afyonkarahisar (1931, 1935, 1939)

Personal details
- Born: 1889 Afyonkarahisar, Ottoman Empire
- Died: 18 December 1940 (aged 50–51)
- Education: Istanbul University

Cemal Akçin (1889 – 18 December 1940) was a Turkish merchant, businessman and politician. He graduated from the Istanbul University Faculty of Law. He was a member of the Grand National Assembly of Turkey from the Afyonkarahisar district in the 4th, 5th and 6th parliaments, as well as the director of the Afyonkarahisar Electricity Institute. Prior to the Surname Law of 1935 he was known as Mollaoğlu Cemal.
