= 1939 in Turkey =

- Centuries: 20th; 21st
- Decades: 1920s; 1930s; 1940s; 1950s
- See also: List of years in Turkey

Events in the year 1939 in Turkey.

== Parliament ==
- 5th Parliament of Turkey (up to 3 April)
- 6th Parliament of Turkey

== Incumbents ==
- President – İsmet İnönü
- Prime Minister

Celal Bayar
Refik Saydam

== Ruling party and the main opposition ==
- Ruling party – Republican People's Party (CHP)

== Cabinet ==
- 10th government of Turkey (up to 25 January)
- 11th government of Turkey (25 January – 3 April)
- 12th government of Turkey (from 3 April)

== Events ==
- 25 January – Prime minister Celal Bayar resigned. İsmet İnönü appointed Refik Saydam as the new prime minister *26 March – General elections
- 26 June – Hatay Republic decided to merge to Turkey
- 23 July – The last of the French military troops left Hatay
- 22 September – Dikili Earthquake.46 deaths
- 19 October – Defensive alliance with United Kingdom and France
- 27/28 December – The 7.8 M_{w} Erzincan earthquake shakes eastern Turkey with a maximum Mercalli intensity of XII (Extreme), causing $20 million in damage, and leaving 32,700–32,968 dead.

== Births ==
- 10 February – Enver Ören, business man, newspaper owner
- 11 February – Okay Temiz, musician
- 10 June – Ahmet Taner Kışlalı, academic, politician
- 25 July – Filiz Dinçmen, first female ambassador of Turkey
- 31 October – Çiğdem Talu, lyricist
- 2 December – Özcan Arkoç, goalkeeper
- 27 December – Leyla Sayar, actress

== Deaths ==
- 19 May – Ahmet Ağaoğlu (born in 1869), journalist
- 25 September – Ali Saip Ursavaş (1887), politician
- 20 December – Yakup Şevki Subaşı (born in 1876), retired general
- 25 December – Ömer Halis Bıyıktay (born in 1883), retired general

== Gallery ==
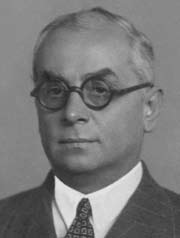
Celal Bayar

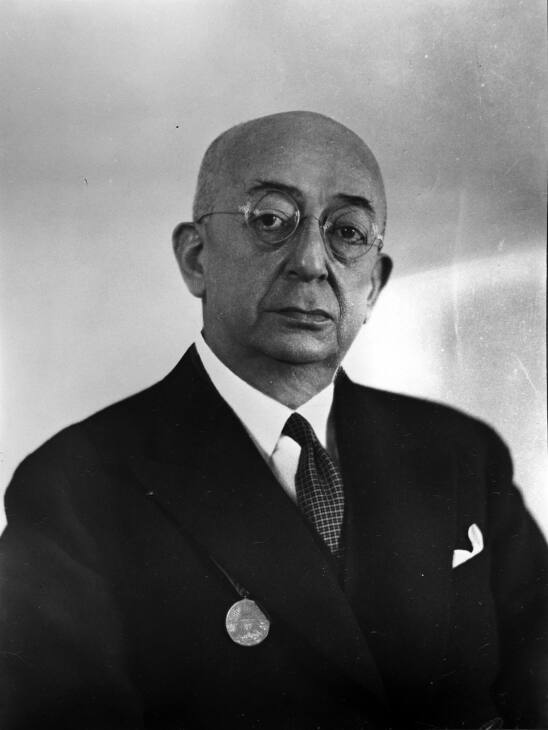
Refik Saydam

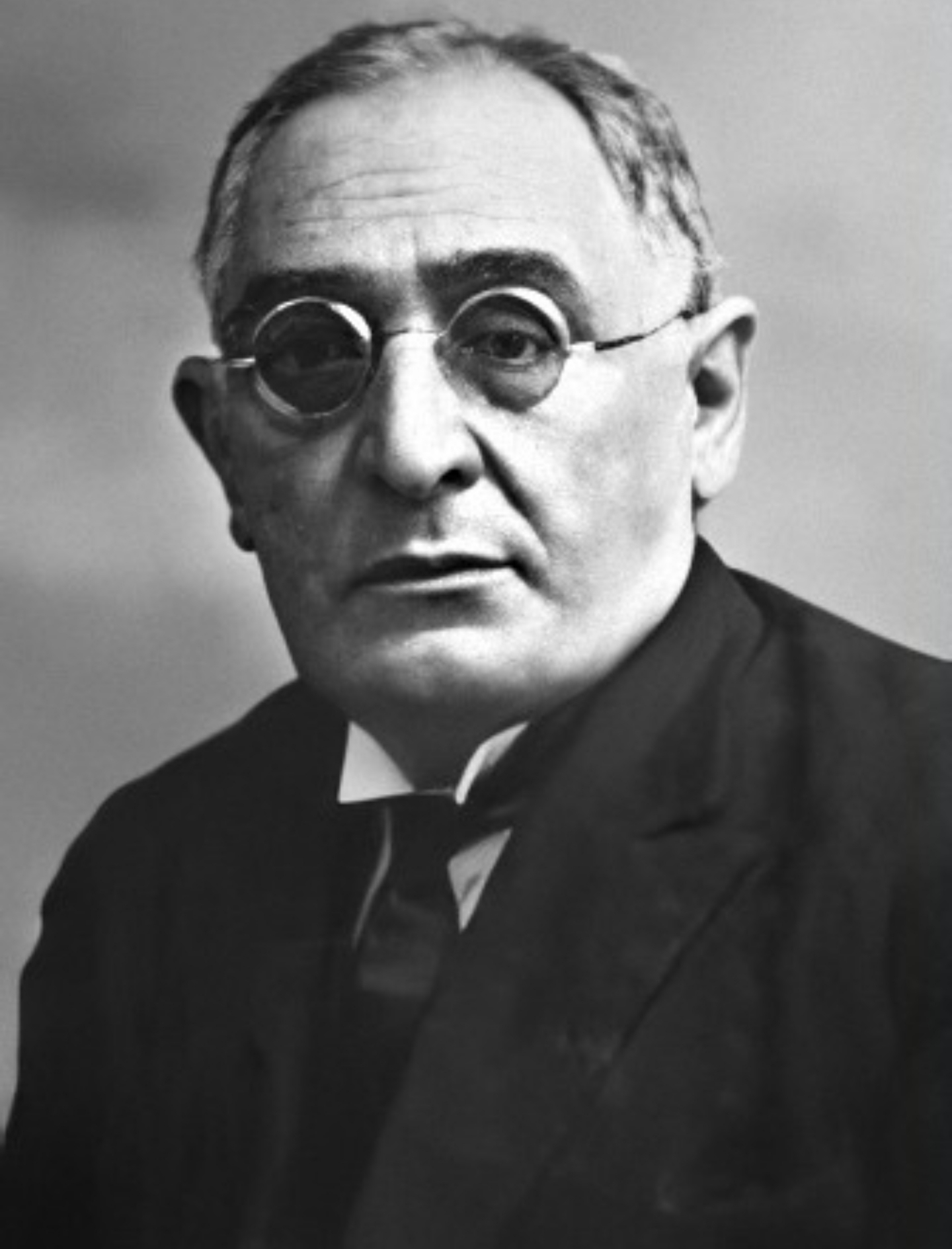
Ahmet Ağaoğlu

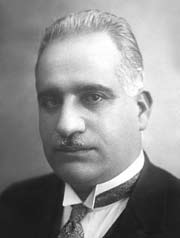
Ali Saip Ursavaş

Yakup Şevki

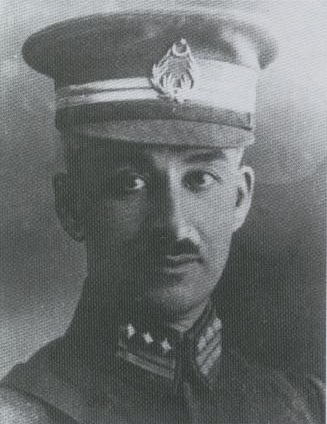
Ömer Halis Bıyıktay
