= 1937 in Turkey =

- Centuries: 20th; 21st
- Decades: 1920s; 1930s; 1940s; 1950s
- See also: List of years in Turkey

Events in the year 1937 in Turkey.

== Parliament ==
- 5th Parliament of Turkey

== Incumbents ==
- President – Kemal Atatürk
- Prime Minister

İsmet İnönü (up to 20 September)
Celal Bayar (from 20 September acting, from 1 November de jure)

== Ruling party and the main opposition ==
- Ruling party – Republican People's Party (CHP)

== Cabinet ==
- 8th government of Turkey (up to 1 November)
- 9th government of Turkey(from 1 November)

== Events ==
- 5 January: Amendment in constitution; Six Arrows were implemented
- 12 May: Kemal Atatürk dedicated his farms to the treasury
- 17 May: Divriği iron ore, the largest in Turkey was spotted
- 29 May: Hatay agreement with France
- 9 July: Saadabad Pact reached with Iraq, Iran, and Afghanistan.
- 14 September: Nyon agreement
- 25 October: Prime minister İsmet İnönü resigned. Celal Bayar was appointed as the new prime minister.
- 1 November: New government

== Births ==
- 1 January – Şenol Birol, footballer
- 20 January – Özkan Sümer, footballer, coach
- 1 April – Yılmaz Güney, actor
- 20 April – Yılmaz Onay, author
- 1 May – Üner Tan, MD, biologist
- 14 November – Önder Sav, politician
- 16 August – Ergun Öztuna, footballer
- 18 August – Duygun Yersuvat, Galatasaray S.K. (sports club) chairman
- 8 September – Cüneyt Arkın (Fahrettin Cüreklibakır), actor
- 29 October – Ayla Algan, singer
- 8 December – Erol Çevikçe, politician

== Deaths ==
- 11 January – Nuri Conker, military officer (Atatürk's friend)
- 12 April – Abdülhak Hamit Tarhan (born in 1852), writer, diplomat
- 10 October – Ahmet Refik Altınay (born in 1881), historian
- 15 November – Seyit Rıza (born in 1863), tribe leader

== Gallery ==
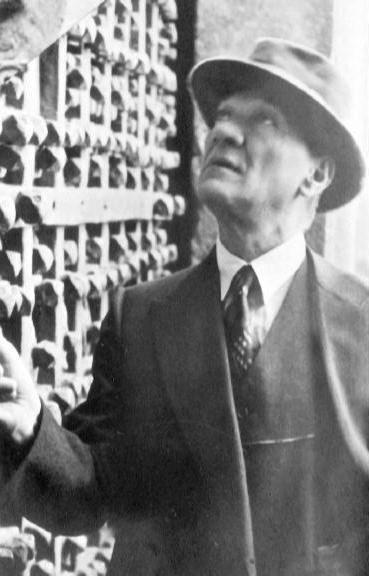
Kemal Atatürk

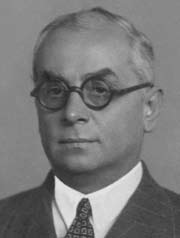
Celal Bayar

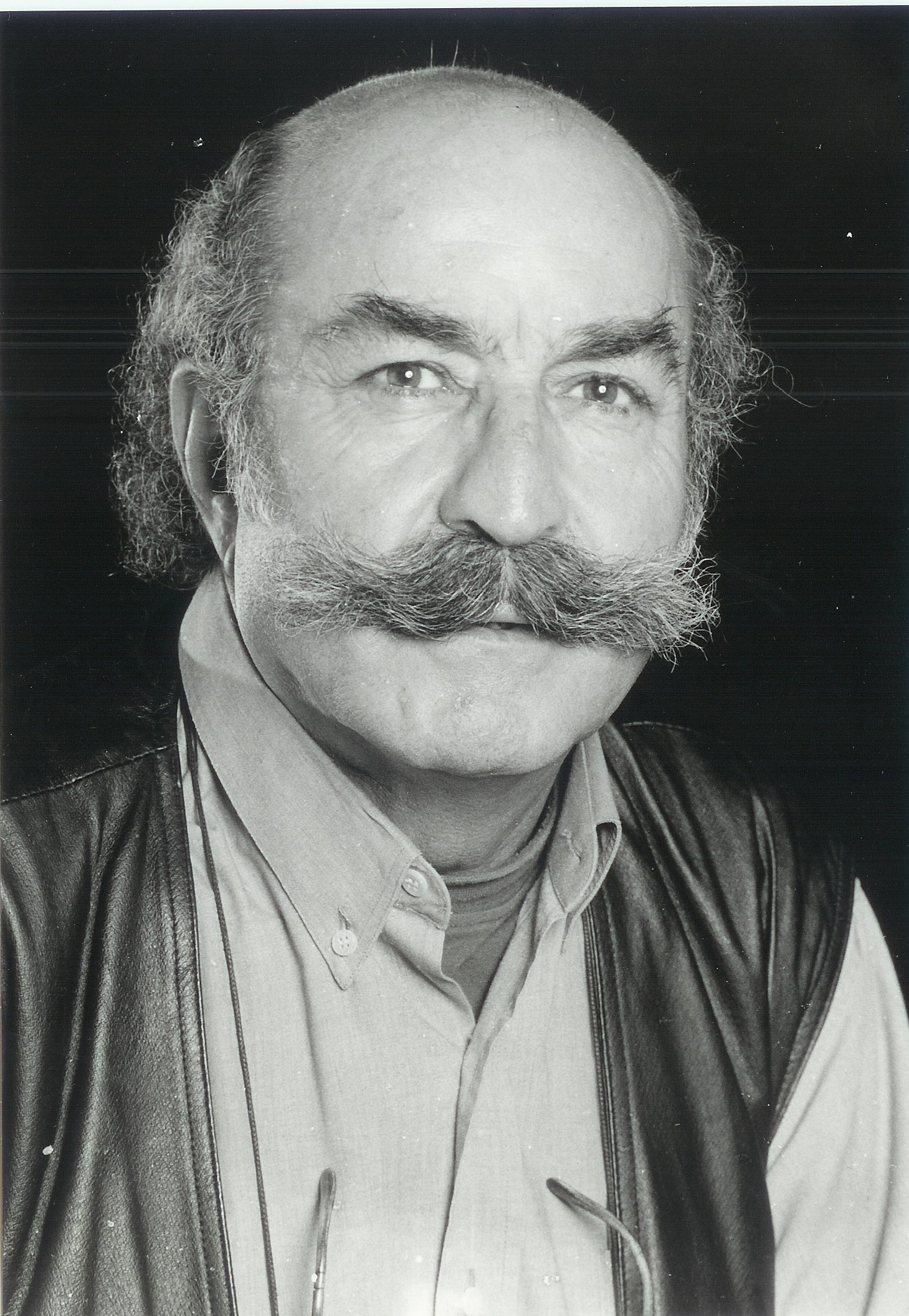
Yılmaz Onay

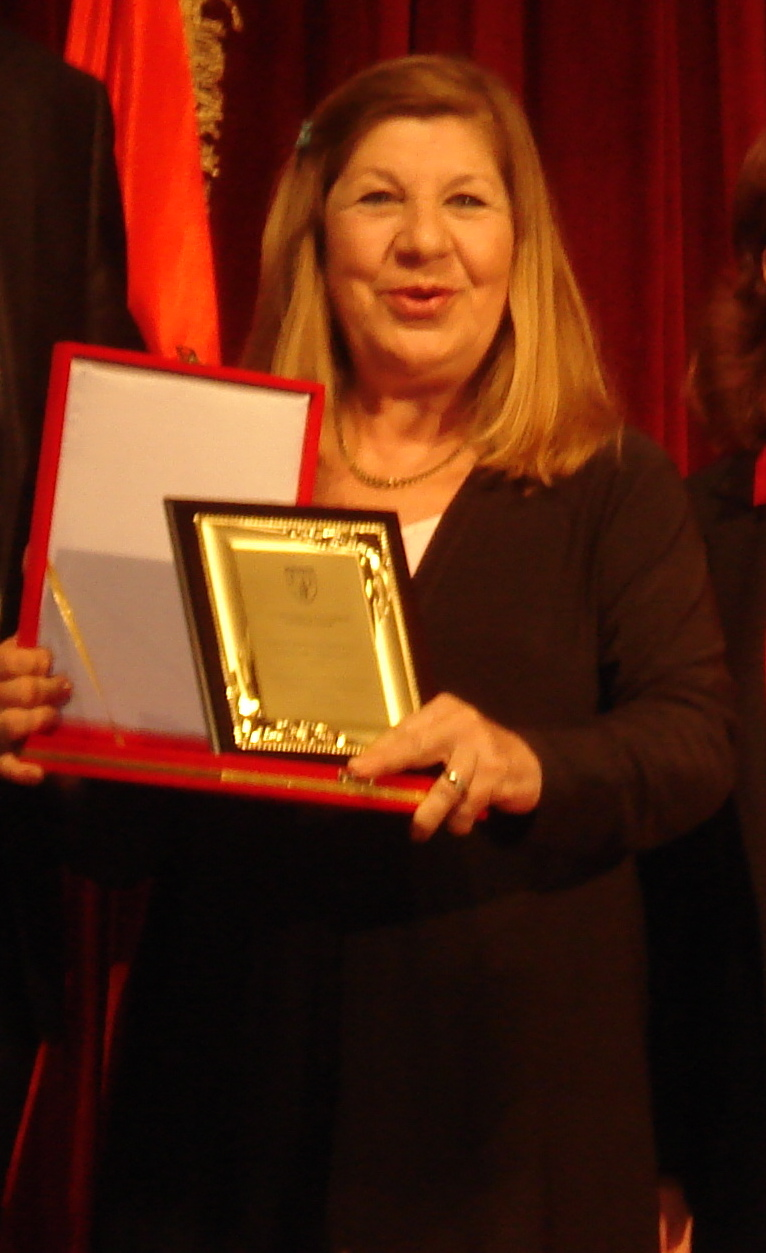
Ayla Algan

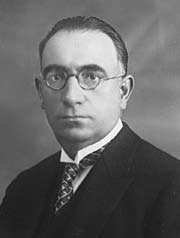
Nuri Conker

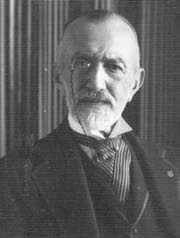
Abdülhak Hamit Tarhan

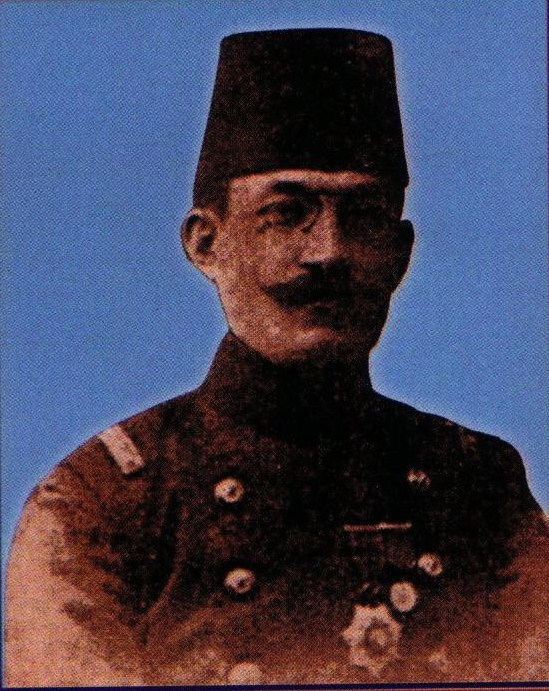
Ahmet Refik Altınay

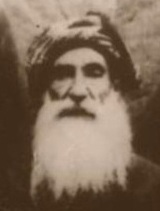
Seyit Rıza
