= 1941 in Turkey =

- Centuries: 20th; 21st
- Decades: 1920s; 1930s; 1940s; 1950s; 1960s
- See also: List of years in Turkey

Events in the year 1941 in Turkey.

== Parliament ==
- 6th Parliament of Turkey

== Incumbents ==
- President – İsmet İnönü
- Prime Minister – Refik Saydam

== Ruling party and the main opposition ==
- Ruling party – Republican People's Party (CHP)

== Cabinet ==
12th government of Turkey

== Events ==
- 18 January: Petrol Ofisi a national petroleum company founded.
- 24 March: Turco Soviet declaration. Soviet Union promised neutrality in case of an assault on Turkey.
- 18 June: German-Turkish Friendship and Nonaggression Pact signed.
- 22 June: Turkey declared neutrality in the recently started Germany-USSR War.
- 23 June: Refah tragedy, a Turkish ship was torpedoed by an anonymous battle ship, causing 168 deaths.
- 10 December: 1941 Van–Erciş earthquake
- 19 December: Due to war time hardships, bread consumption was restricted in Istanbul.

== Births ==
- 15 May – Özdemir Sabancı, industrialist (died 1996)
- 24 June – Erkin Koray, musician
- 18 July – Bedrettin Dalan, Mayor of İstanbul
- 7 August – Gündüz Aktan, diplomat and politician (died 2008)
- 26 August – Ayşe Kulin, writer
- 13 September – Ahmet Necdet Sezer, president (2000–2007)
- 21 November – İdil Biret, pianist
- 26 December – Şener Şen, actor

== Deaths ==
- 25 April – Salih Bozok (born in 1881), Atatürk's aide de camp
- 3 July – Kâzım Dirik (born in 1881), retired general
- 17 July – Meliha Ulaş (born in 1901), politician, teacher
- 7 October – Cemal Mersinli (born in 1875), retired general

== Gallery ==
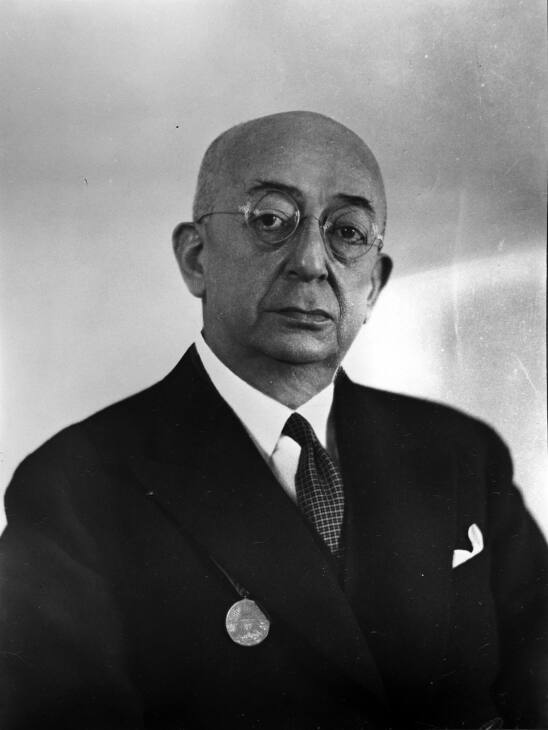
Refik Saydam

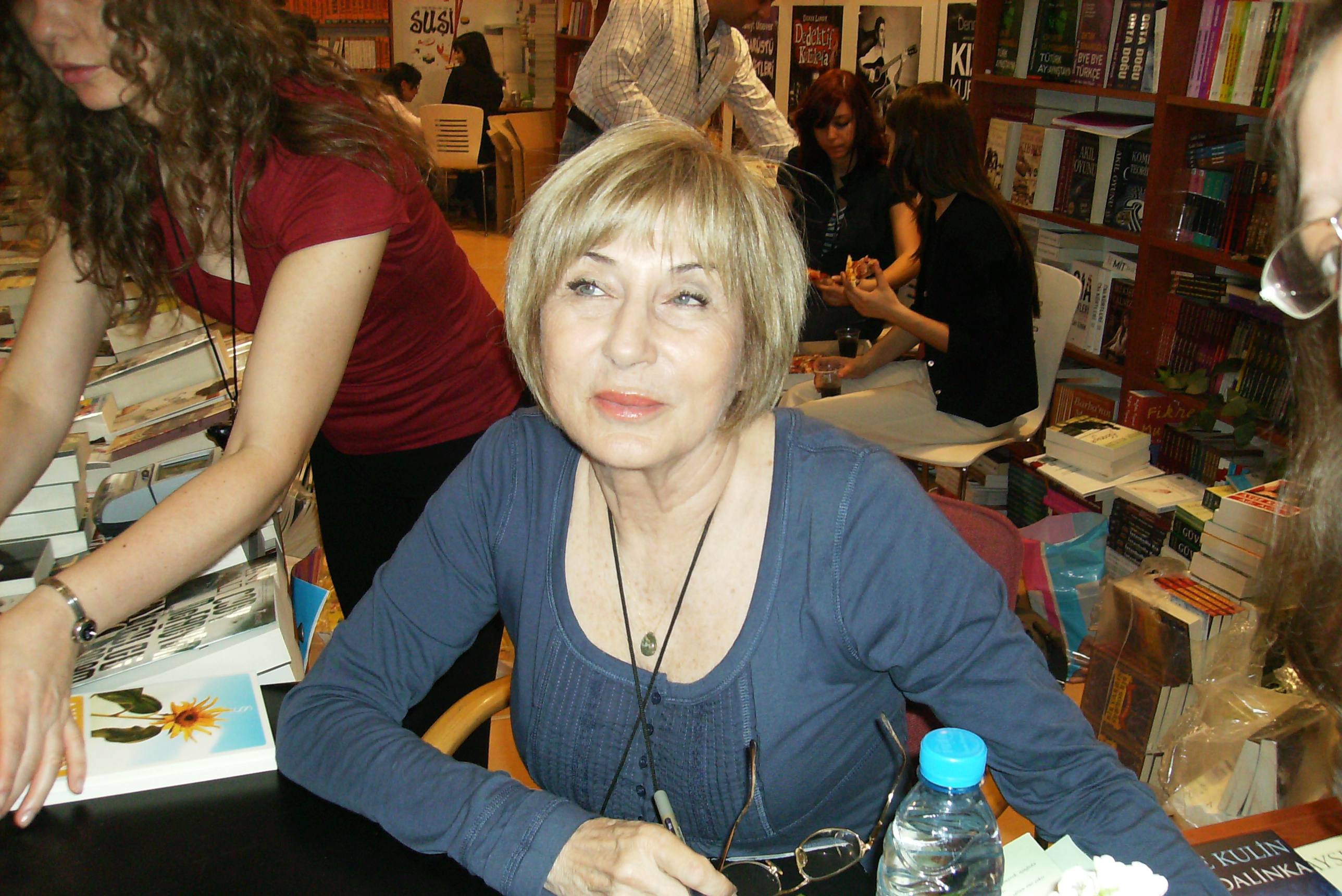
Ayşe Kulin

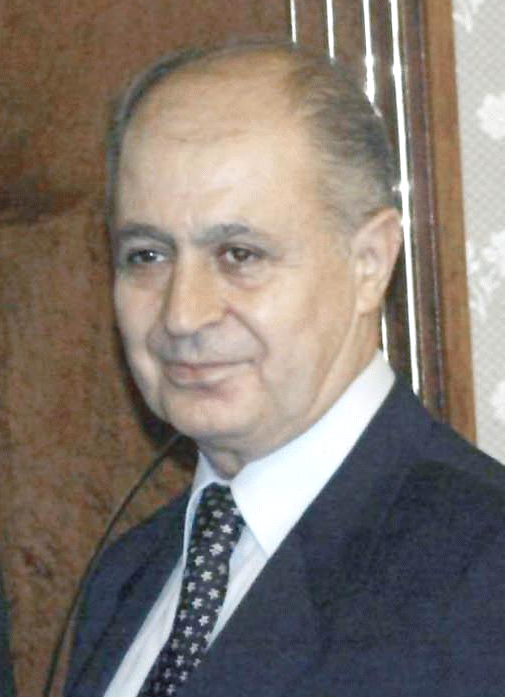
Ahmet Necdet Sezer

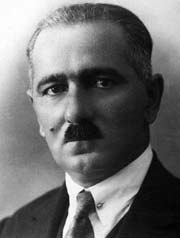
Salih Bozok

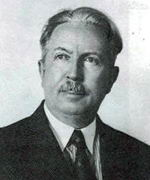
Kazım Dirik

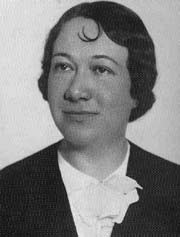
Meliha Ulaş

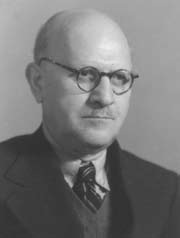
Cemal Mersinli
