= 1944 in Turkey =

- Centuries: 20th; 21st
- Decades: 1920s; 1930s; 1940s; 1950s; 1960s
- See also: List of years in Turkey

Events in the year 1944 in Turkey.

== Parliament ==
- 7th Parliament of Turkey

== Incumbents ==
- President – İsmet İnönü
- Prime Minister – Şükrü Saracoğlu

== Ruling party and the main opposition ==
- Ruling party – Republican People's Party (CHP)

== Cabinet ==
- 14th government of Turkey

== Events ==
- 18 January – Marine accident in Bandırma. 24 deaths
- 1 February – 1944 Bolu–Gerede earthquake (north west Anatolia) 3959 deaths
- 31 March – Turkish cargo ship Krom was torpedoed (Although the freight was wheat, the name of the ship was Krom (Chromium) and it was probably torpedoed because it was assumed that its freight might be chromium to Germany)
- 4 June – End of Ottoman Public Debt Administration (after 90 years)
- 2 August – End of diplomatic relations with Germany
- 6 October – The 1944 Gulf of Edremit–Ayvacik earthquake triggers a tsunami and kills at least 73 people.
- 7 December – Turkey joined the International Aviation Agreement

== Births ==
- 15 March – Nebahat Çehre, actress
- 4 April – Toktamış Ateş, academic
- 17 August – Semra Sezer, teacher, wife of former president Ahmet Necdet Sezer
- 19 September – İsmet Özel, poet
- 12 October – Abdülkadir Aksu, politician
- 14 October – Şerif Gören, movie director
- 11 November – Kemal Sunal, actor
- 22 November – Osman Korutürk, diplomat and politician
- 17 December – İlhan Erdost, publisher

== Deaths ==
- 14 January – Mehmet Emin Yurdakul, poet
- 8 March – Hüseyin Rahmi Gürpınar, writer
- 23 August – Abdülmecid II, caliph and a member of the Ottoman dynasty (died in exile)
- 11 November – Münir Ertegün, diplomat

== Gallery ==
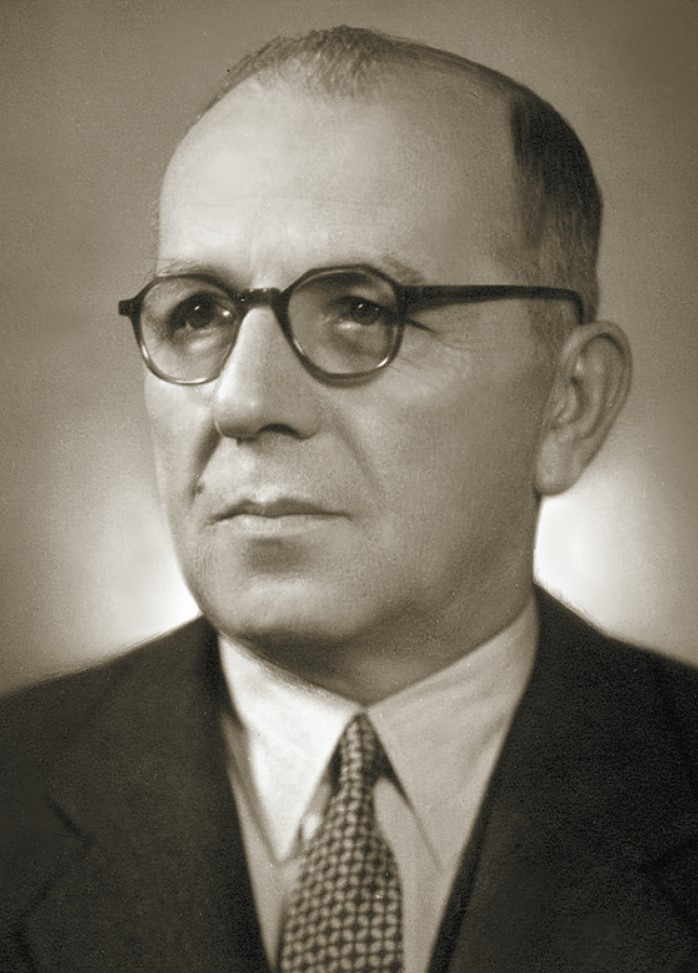
Şükrü Saracoğlu

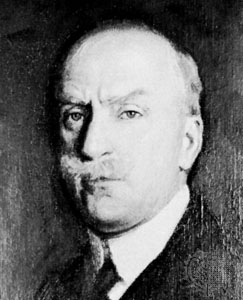
Abdülmecid II

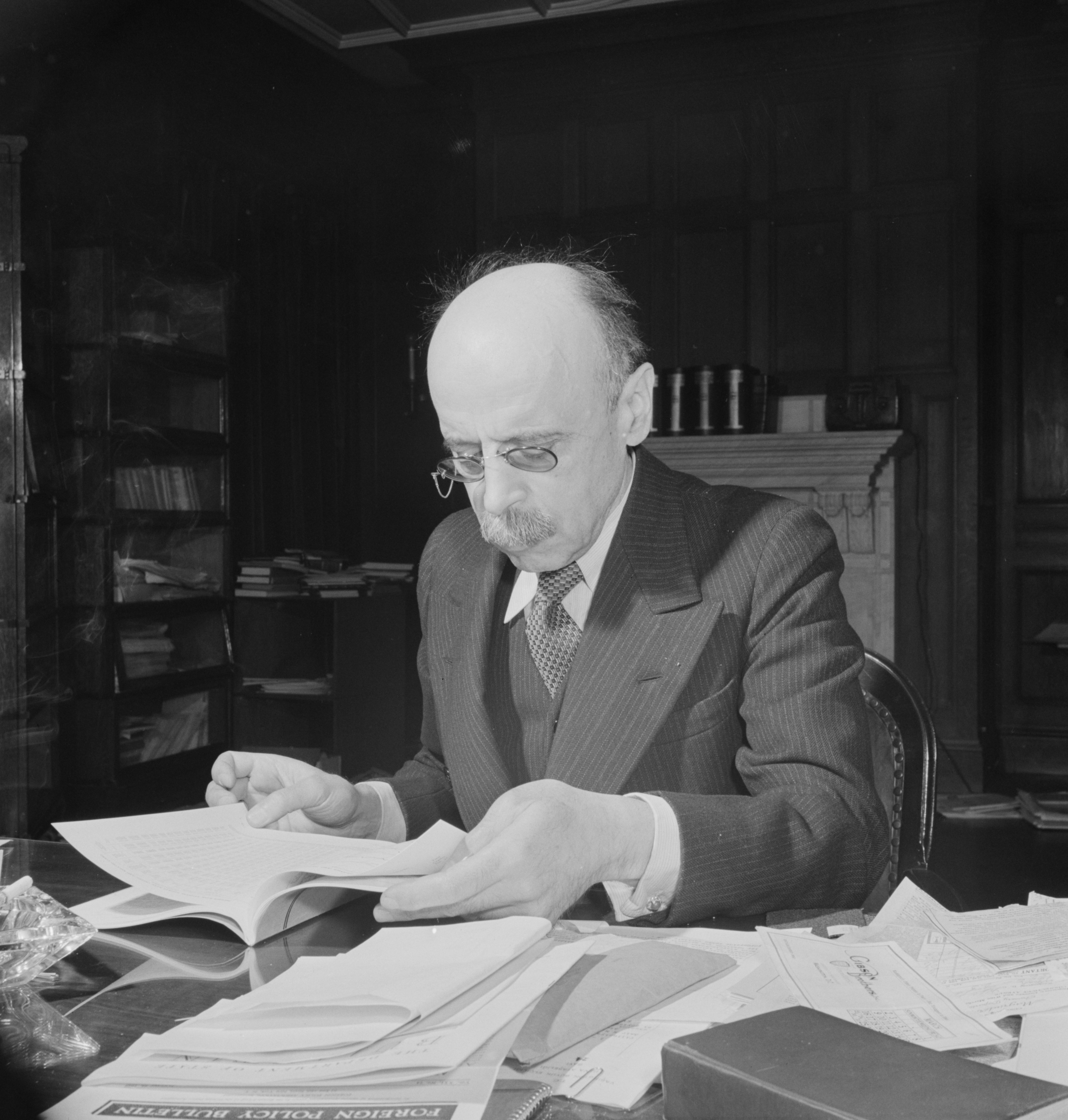
Münir Ertegün

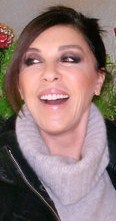
Nebahat Çehre
