= 1940 in Turkey =

- Centuries: 20th; 21st
- Decades: 1920s; 1930s; 1940s; 1950s; 1960s
- See also: List of years in Turkey

Events in the year 1940 in Turkey.

== Parliament ==
- 6th Parliament of Turkey

== Incumbents ==
- President – İsmet İnönü
- Prime Minister – Refik Saydam

== Ruling party and the main opposition ==
- Ruling party – Republican People's Party (CHP)

== Cabinet ==
12th government of Turkey

== Events ==
- 18 January – Law of national prevention (Milli Korunma Kanunu) a law which authorizes the government to control the economy to overcome the war time hardships
- 17 April – The law of Village Institutes
- 29 June – Turco German trade agreement
- 20 October – Census (Population17,820,950)
- 25 November – Martial law in the European part of Turkey
- 20 December – Earthquake in the East Anatolia

== Births ==
- 1 January – Alp Yalman, businessman
- 23 January – Dinç Bilgin, businessman, media owner
- 27 January – Ahmet Kurtcebe Alptemoçin, government minister
- 15 February – İsmail Cem İpekçi, government minister (d. 2007)
- 23 February – Kamer Genç, politician (d. 2016)
- 10 July – Rıfat Çalışkan, cyclist (d. 2009)
- 29 July – Aytaç Yalman, general (d. 2020)
- 1 September – Yaşar Büyükanıt, chief of staff (d. 2019)
- 6 September – Mesut Yılmaz, prime minister (48th, 53rd and 55th government of Turkey) (d. 2020)
- 18 October – Onur Öymen, politician, diplomat
- 20 November – Ediz Hun, actor
- 20 December – Mehdi Zana, politician and author (d. 2026)

== Deaths ==
- 19 March – Besim Ömer Akalın (born in 1862), MD and politician
- 18 April – Lütfi Müfit Özdeş (born in 1874), military officer
- 13 October – Muhittin Akyüz (born in 1879), military officer, diplomat and politician

== Gallery ==
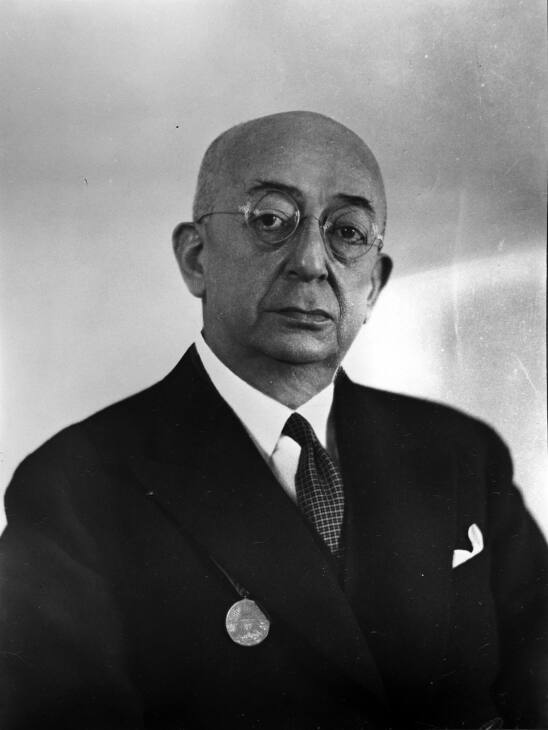
Refik Saydam

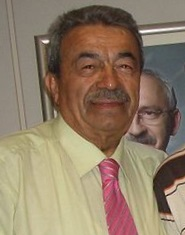
Kamer Genç

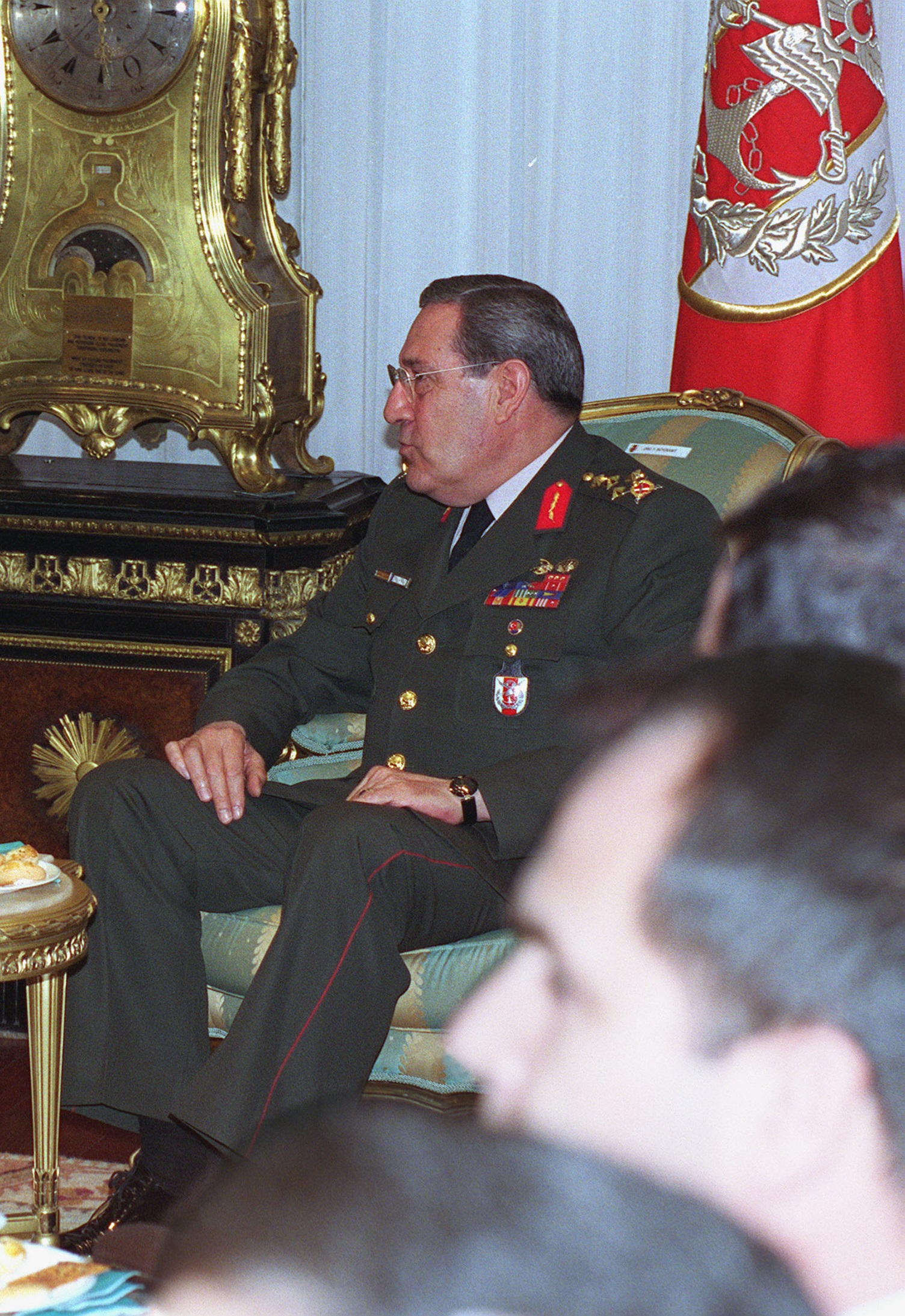
Yaşar Büyükanıt

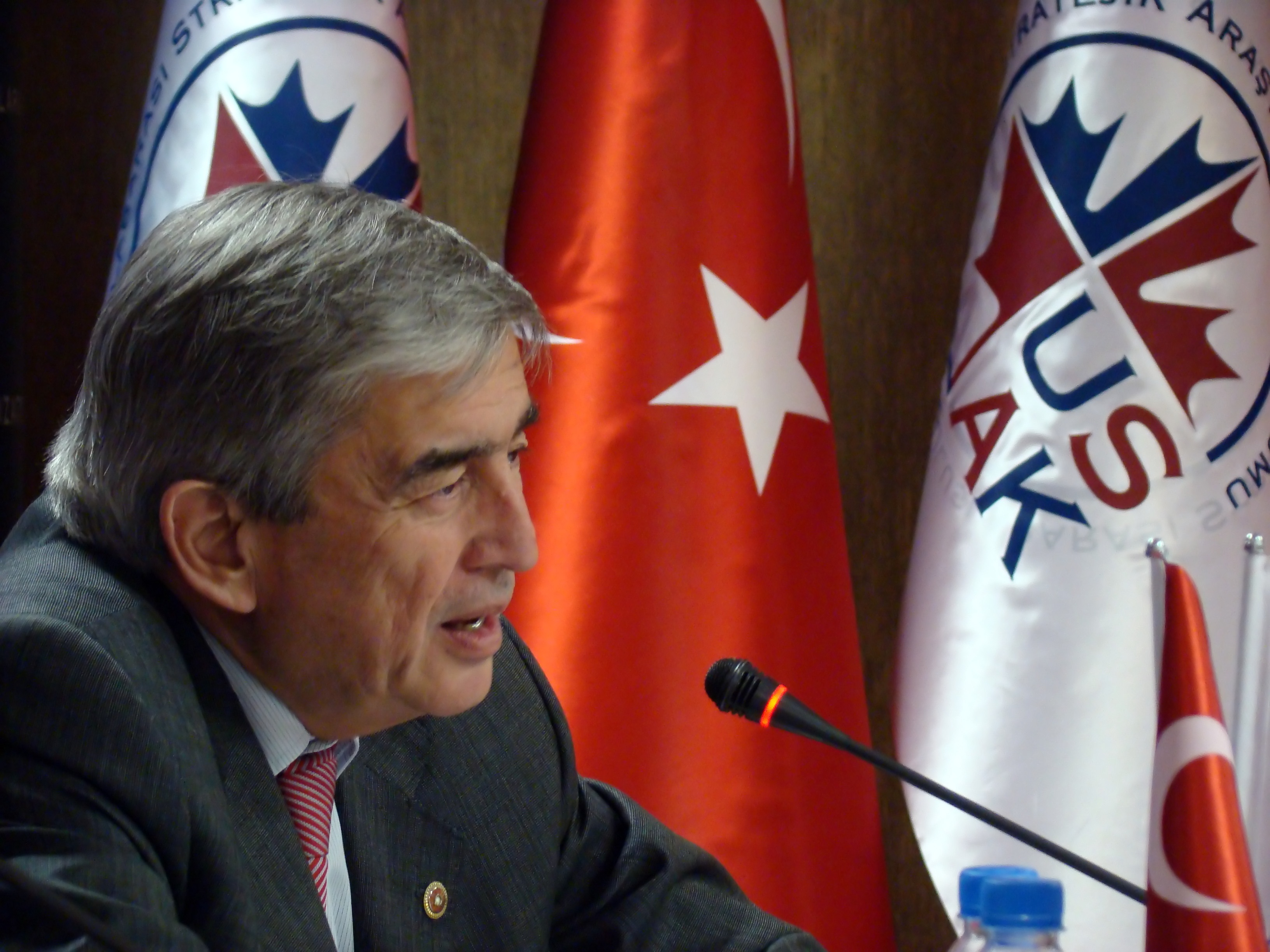
Onur Öymen

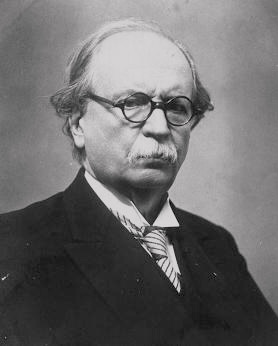
Besim Ömer Akalın

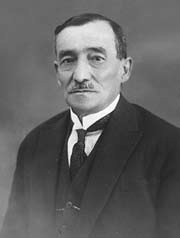
Lütfi Müfit Özdeş

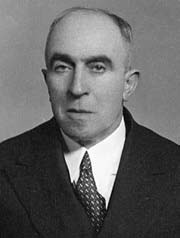
Muhittin Akyüz
