= Kalontarov =

Kalontarov, Kalondarov or Kalandarov is a Tajik masculine surname; its feminine counterpart is Kalontarova, Kalondarova or Kalandarova. It may refer to the following notable people:

- Bakhtior Kalandarov (born 1992), Tajikistani football player
- Malika Kalontarova (born 1950), Tajik–American dancer
- Ziv Kalontarov (born 1997), Israeli Olympic swimmer
