= Malika Kalontarova =

Tajik-American dancer (born 1950)

- Малика Қаландарова
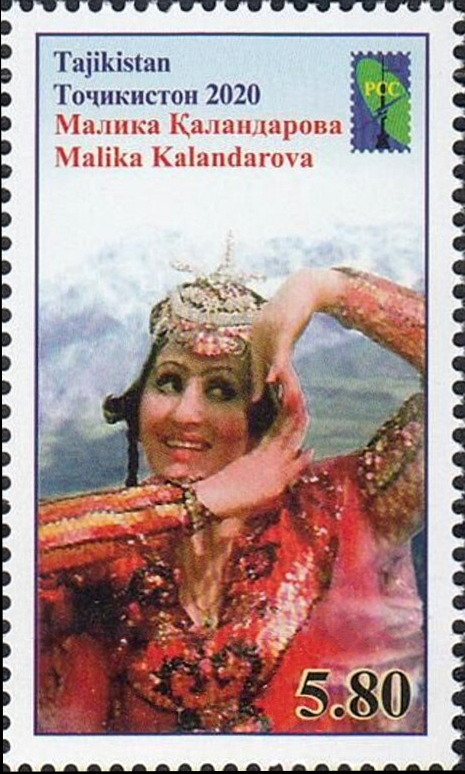
- Kalontarova on a 2020 stamp
- Born: Mazol Yashuvayevna Qalandarova; 2 September 1950 (age 76); Stalinabad, Tajik SSR, Soviet Union (present-day Dushanbe)
- Occupations: Dancer; dance teacher; actress
- Spouse: Ilyas Gulkarov

Malika Yashuvayevna Kolontarova (Note: Tajik: Малика Яшуваевна Қаландарова, romanized: Malika Yashuvayevna Qalandarova; Russian: Малика Яшуваевна Каландарова, romanized: Malika Yashuvayevna Kalandarova) (born 2 September 1950, born Mazol) (Note: Tajik: Мазол, romanized: Mazol; Russian: Мазол, romanized: Mazol) is a Jewish–American dancer. She is known as the "Queen of Tajik and Oriental Dance."

== Biography ==
Kolontarova was born with the name Mazol to Yashuva Kolontarov and Tamara Khanimova Kolontarova (both originally from Samarkand, Uzbekistan), a religious Bukharian Jewish family in Dushanbe, Tajikistan and was the youngest of her 5 sisters and 2 brothers. Mazol's father Yashuva wanted her to become a hairdresser like her older sisters, but Malika refused and wanted to become a dancer instead. Her father later on let her pursue a career in dancing. Even though Kolontarova was rebellious as a child and had bigger dreams, she never forgot her roots, even when she became famous. Being Jewish was looked down upon in the Soviet Union and in Tajikistan but Malika proudly identified herself as a Bukharian Jew stating that since she is famous and admired, she does not feel the need to hide her Jewish identity. "Most Jewish people [in Tajikistan] say they are Tajik or they are Russian because Jews get no good work, no good pay," she says, "But once I'm famous, I'm not afraid. I say, 'Me Jewish.'" Kolontarova was trained in dance by Ghaffor Valamatzoda and Remziye Tarsinova. Her director wanted her to change her name from Mazol to Malika. He said that Mazol sounded "too Jewish" and Malika means Queen in Arabic and Kolontarova danced like a Queen.

== Career ==
Malika began her career in 1965 with "Lola Dance Ensemble" and later went on to the Song and Dance Ensemble of the Tajik Philharmonic (Dushanbe). From the beginning, her dance moves were completely in sync with the music. Kolantarova became one of the most famous entertainers in the USSR and in Central Asia. She performed not only in Central Asia, but all over the Soviet Union and Asia. She was well known for her folk dances, and the dances which she created became a part of the Central Asian artistic culture. Kolontarova toured and performed different national dances in the countries such as Japan, Afghanistan, Spain, Turkey, Russia and India. While in India, she appeared in some Bollywood films in the 1970s, as well as films in the Tajik movie industry between the 60s and the collapse of the USSR.

Kolontarova married Ilyas (Ishaq) Gulkarov, a Bukharian Jewish doira player and "Honored Artist of Tajikistan." The two went on tour in Europe, Asia, and all over the Soviet Union.

Kolontarova was given the country's highest honor when she was named People's Artist of USSR in 1984, becoming the only woman from Tajikistan to receive the title, after receiving the awards of People's Artist of the Tajik SSR in 1976 and Honored Artist of the Tajik SSR in 1972. According to Igor Moiseyev, a director of a world-renowned folk and character dance ensemble in the USSR, Malika is "an Eastern miracle" and she "made a revolution in Oriental popular dancing."

=== Emigration to the United States ===
Following the collapse of the USSR, Malika and her family moved to Queens, New York, in the United States in 1993 to escape the turmoil and poverty in Tajikistan. In America, Kolontarova continued her dancing career by opening up the "Malika's International Dance School" to teach young girls how to dance.

== Personal life ==
Kolontarova and Gulkarov live in Rego Park, a neighbourhood of Queens populated by around 50,000 Bukharan Jews that has earned the nickname of Queenistan. They have two children.

== Filmography ==
- 1961 — Zumrad
- 1970 — The Bride and Groom — Gulniora
- 1971 — The Tale of Rustam
- 1972 — Hurricane in the Valley — Gultchekhra Clip of the film (in Tajik).
- 1984 — And One More Night of Scheherazade...
- 1986 — New Tales of Scheherazade
- 1987 — The Last Night of Scheherazade
- 1989 — Sherali and Oybarchin

== Awards ==
- People's Artist of USSR, 1984
- State Award of the Tajik SSR, 1984
- People's Artist of the Tajik SSR, 1976
- Honored Artist of the Tajik SSR, 1972

== See also ==
- List of dancers
