= Burcu Köksal =

Turkish politician (born 1980)

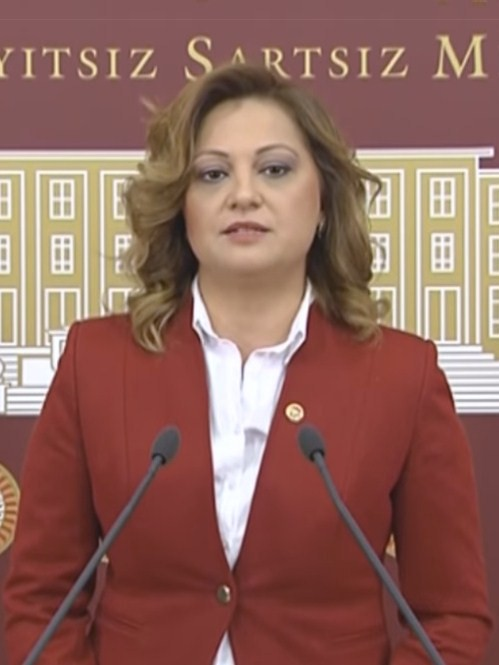

Mayor of Afyonkarahisar
- Incumbent
- Assumed office 3 April 2024
- Preceded by: Mehmet Zeybek

Deputy Parliamentary Group Leader of the Republican People's Party
- In office 3 June 2023 – 3 April 2024
- Leader: Kemal Kılıçdaroğlu; Özgür Özel
- Preceded by: Engin Altay
- Succeeded by: Murat Emir

Member of the Grand National Assembly
- In office 23 June 2015 – 3 April 2024
- Constituency: Afyonkarahisar (June 2015, Nov 2015, 2018, 2023)

Personal details
- Born: 18 January 1980 (age 46) Afyonkarahisar, Turkey
- Party: AK Party (2026–)
- Other political affiliations: Republican People's Party (2015–2018, 2018–2026); Good Party (2018)
- Spouse: Yasin Köksal (m. 2015)
- Children: 1
- Education: Istanbul University
- Occupation: Politician

Burcu Köksal (born 18 January 1980) is a Turkish politician from the Justice and Development Party (Turkey) (AK Party), who is currently the Mayor of Afyonkarahisar. She previously served as a Member of Parliament for Afyonkarahisar from 7 June 2015 until she was elected mayor in 2024.

== Early life and career ==
Burcu Köksal was born on 18 January 1980 to a family of teachers in Afyonkarahisar. She completed her primary and secondary education in Afyonkarahisar and graduated from Istanbul University Faculty of Law. She has been a lawyer in Afyonkarahisar since 8 March 2004.

She took part in Ataturkist Thought Association, Afyonkarahisar Branch of Association for the Support of Contemporary Life and Consumer Protection Association.

== Political career ==
Koksal served as President of the Republican People's Party (CHP) Afyonkarahisar Women's Branch in 2007. Köksal contested CHP preselection for the June 2015 general election, beating incumbent CHP MP Ahmet Toptaş for the first place list position, and was subsequently elected as the lone CHP Member of Parliament for Afyonkarahisar. She was narrowly re-elected in the snap November 2015 elections.

Köksal was one of 15 CHP deputies to join the Good Party on 21 April 2018 to make the party eligible to contest the 2018 election. She retained first place on the CHP party list for Afyonkarahisar in the 2018 Elections and was re-elected.

She was a member of the Turkish Grand National Assembly Presidency Council for the first half of the 27th Parliament of Turkey

Köksal was renominated for the first place list position for Afyonkarahisar for the 2023 elections, and was re-elected. She was then named a CHP deputy leader for the 28th Turkish Parliament.

Köksal was selected as the CHP Mayoral candidate for Afyonkarahisar for the 2024 local elections. During the campaign, she attracted controversy for saying the doors of Afyonkarahar would be open to everyone except members of the Peoples' Equality and Democracy Party. Istanbul Mayor Ekrem İmamoğlu called on her to resign her candidacy or join a different party. As a result of her remarks, the CHP sent a non-discrimination pledge to all their mayoral candidates and required them to sign it.

Köksal was elected Mayor of Afyonkarahisar with 50.73% of the vote and became the first female mayor of the city. She was sworn in on 3 April 2024 and her resignation from Parliament took effect on the same day.

Köksal resigned from the CHP in May 2026 and shortly thereafter joined the AK Party. This came shortly after rumours she was planning to defect due to disagreements with CHP leadership.

== Personal life ==
On June 26, 2015, she married television programmer Yasin Köksal. Burcu Köksal has a son from her previous marriage.
