= Murat Emir =

Turkish politician

Murat Emir MP
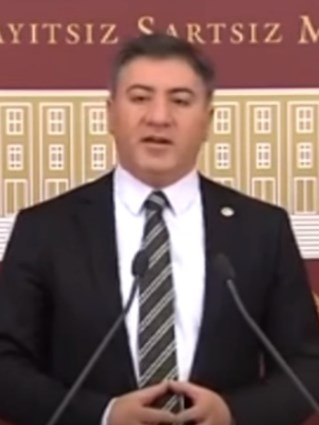

Deputy Parliamentary Group Leader of the Republican People's Party
- Incumbent
- Assumed office 18 April 2024
- Preceded by: Burcu Köksal

Member of the Grand National Assembly
- Incumbent
- Assumed office 7 June 2015
- Constituency: Ankara (II) (June 2015, Nov 2015, 2018, 2023)

Personal details
- Born: 31 March 1969 (age 57) Malatya, Turkey
- Party: Republican People's Party (CHP)
- Education: Hacettepe University (M.D., Sc.D.); Ankara University (LL.B.); Heidelberg University (Sc.M.)
- Occupation: Politician, ophthalmologist, jurist

Murat Emir (born 31 March 1969) is a Turkish ophthalmologist, jurist and politician from the Republican People's Party (CHP) who has served as the Member of Parliament for Ankara (II) since June 2015.

He is a member of the Constitutional Commission of the Grand National Assembly of Turkey for the CHP.

== See also ==
- 25th Parliament of Turkey
- 26th Parliament of Turkey
