= Halil Ürün =

Turkish politician (born 1968)

Member of the Grand National Assembly
- In office 12 June 2011 – 1 November 2015
- Constituency: Afyonkarahisar (2011, June 2015)

Personal details
- Born: July 3, 1968 (age 58) Afyonkarahisar, Turkey
- Party: Justice and Development Party (AKP)
- Education: Selçuk University
- Occupation: Politician
- Profession: Lawyer
- Website: Personal website

Halil Ürün (born 3 July 1968) is a Turkish politician from the Justice and Development Party (AKP), who has served as a Member of Parliament for Afyonkarahisar since 12 June 2011.

Born in Afyonkarahisar, he graduated from Selçuk University Faculty of Law and became a freelance lawyer. He was a mayoral candidate in both the 1994 and 1999, an applicant to become an MP in the 2002 general election and also an applicant to become a mayoral candidate in the 2009 local elections. He was elected as an AKP Member of Parliament in the 2011 general election and was re-elected in June 2015.

== See also ==
- 24th Parliament of Turkey
- 25th Parliament of Turkey
