= Ali Özkaya =

Turkish politician and lawyer

Ali Özkaya MP

Member of the Grand National Assembly
- Incumbent
- Assumed office 7 June 2015
- Constituency: Afyonkarahisar (June 2015, Nov 2015, 2018)

Personal details
- Born: April 20, 1970 (age 56) Dinar, Afyonkarahisar, Turkey
- Party: Justice and Development Party (AKP)
- Education: Ankara University
- Occupation: Politician
- Profession: Lawyer

Ali Özkaya (born 20 April 1970) is a Turkish politician and lawyer from the Justice and Development Party (AKP), who has served as a Member of Parliament for Afyonkarahisar since 7 June 2015. He is currently the lawyer of Turkish President Recep Tayyip Erdoğan.

Born in the Çayüstü village of Dinar, Afyonkarahisar, he was educated at Isparta Imam Hatip school and graduated from Ankara University Faculty of Law in 1992. He became a freelance lawyer in Ankara and also received further education in the field of commercial law at Gazi University between 1993 and 1995. Having been an unsuccessful AKP candidate in the 2007 and 2011 general elections, he became a legal advisor at the AKP headquarters in 2012 and became the lawyer of the then-AKP leader and then-Prime Minister Recep Tayyip Erdoğan. He continued to serve as Erdoğan's lawyer after his election as President in 2014. He was elected as an AKP Member of Parliament in the June 2015 general election.

== See also ==
- 25th Parliament of Turkey
