= Veysel Eroğlu =

Turkish civil servant

Veysel Eroğlu MP
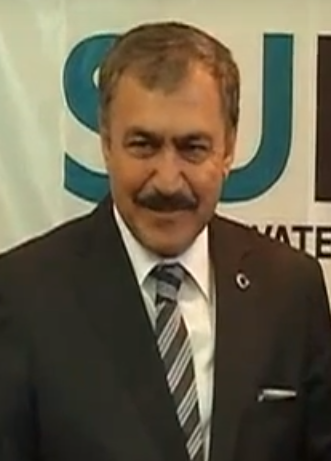

Minister of Forestry and Water Affairs
- In office 29 August 2007 – 10 July 2018
- Prime Minister: Recep Tayyip Erdoğan; Ahmet Davutoğlu; Binali Yıldırım
- Preceded by: Osman Pepe

Member of the Grand National Assembly
- Incumbent
- Assumed office 22 July 2007
- Constituency: İzmir I (2007, 2011, June 2015, Nov 2015); Afyonkarahisar (2018)

Personal details
- Born: 18 August 1948 (age 78) Şuhut, Afyonkarahisar Province, Turkey
- Party: Justice and Development Party (AKP)
- Children: 4
- Education: Istanbul Technical University
- Profession: Politician, academic, civil engineer
- Cabinet: 60th, 61st, 62nd, 63rd, 64th, 65th

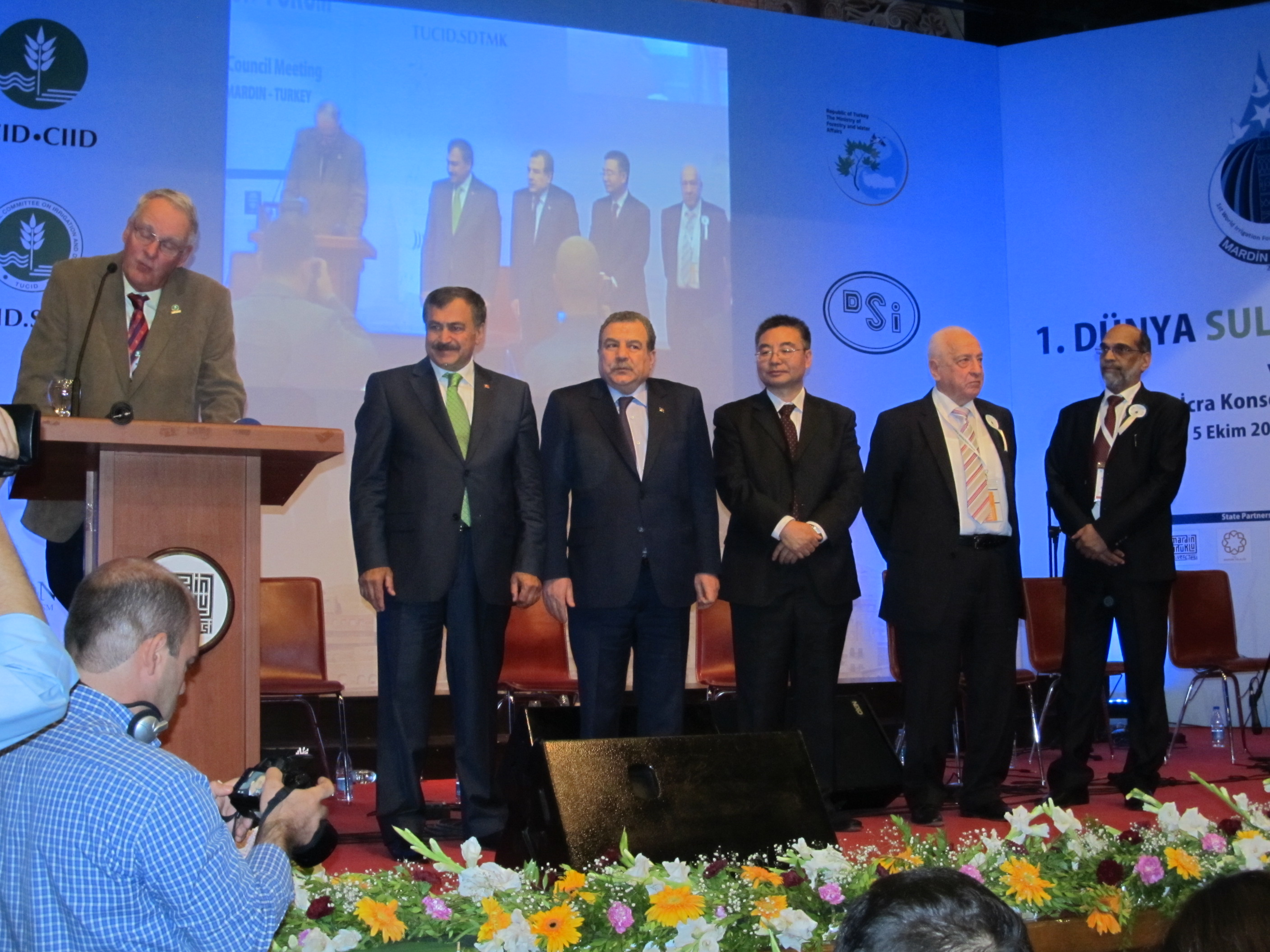
Veysel Eroğlu during the inaugural ceremony of the 1st World Irrigation Forum (standing left in the group).

Veysel Eroğlu (born 18 August 1948) is a Member of Parliament for Afyonkarahisar of the ruling Justice and Development Party and a former Minister of Forestry and Water of Turkey.

== Early life ==
Eroğlu was born on 18 August 1948 in the Şuhut district of Turkey's Afyonkarahisar Province. His father's name was İbrahim and his mother's name was Emine.

He completed his primary education at Şuhut Zaferyolu Primary School and Şuhut Middle School. He completed his secondary education at Afyonkarahisar High School in 1966, entering the Civil Engineering program of Istanbul Technical University in 1967. He graduated in 1971 with a degree in civil engineering.

== Early career ==
Between 1976 and 1977 Eroğlu was an assistant lecturer in the Hydraulics Department of the Engineering Faculty of Yıldız Technical University. He completed his doctorate thesis in 1980, and from 1980 to 1981 continued as an assistant lecturer in the Department of Environmental Engineering Department of İstanbul Technical University. Eroğlu carried out postgraduate studies and research at the International Institute for Hydraulic and Environmental Engineering in Delft (Netherlands) in the 1981-1982 academic year, completing the year with the highest grade. After his return to Turkey he became an associate professor in 1984, lecturing in the Environmental Engineering Department. In 1991 Eroğlu was awarded the title of full professor and became head of the Department of Environmental Engineering.

== General Director (İSKİ) ==
In 1994 Eroğlu was appointed General Director of the Istanbul Water and Sewerage Administration (İSKİ). In the eight years he remained in this post he solved the long-standing problem of Istanbul's drinking water completely, building 8 dams and a regulator, five drinking water treatment plants and 38 reservoirs. 97% of the potable water distribution network was renewed during his term of office. He computerised the potable water distribution and wastewater systems in Istanbul (SCADA) and made a major contribution to the problem of wastewater disposal with the construction of 8 wastewater treatment plants and renewal of 85% of the sewerage network. His achievement in cleaning up the previously malodorous and heavily polluted Golden Horn and permitting the return of many species of fish resulted in the presentation of the Metropolis Award to the Istanbul Metropolitan Municipality. Eroğlu transformed İSKİ from an organisation which was heavily in debt and had come virtually to a standstill into an efficient, customer-friendly, profitable organisation. During his period of office he continued to lecture at Istanbul Technical University. Eroğlu resigned from his post on 3 October 2002.

== Director General (DSİ) ==
In February 2003 Eroğlu was appointed Director General of State Hydraulic Works (DSİ), a task embracing dams for irrigation, water supply and hydropower generation, as well as flood control. During the three years he has been in this post, a total of 235 new facilities have been commissioned, enabling irrigation of a further 472,000 ha of land and potable water supplies for an additional 10,000,000 persons. It was during his term of office that work began in earnest on the water supply project for the Turkish Republic of Northern Cyprus. After a brief period of absence from DSİ in 2004 when he was a prospective candidate for mayor of Istanbul in the local elections held in the same year, he returned to his duties at DSİ.

== Political career ==
He was elected to the parliament in 2007 representing İzmir, he was then appointed Minister of the Environment, where, as part of his duties, was responsible for Turkey's strategy and approach to global warming. In January 2019, he became the Turkish envoy for the Turkish-Iraqi water policies. Instead of running in İzmir in the 2018 election he instead ran in Afyonkarahisar where he was reelected.

== Board memberships ==
He is a member of the Istanbul Council, the Waters Foundation (SU VAKFI), the History and Nature Foundation (TATAV), the Turkish Hematological Association (THD), the Turkish National Committee on Water Pollution Research (SKATMK), the Civil Engineering Association (IMO) and İSKİ Sports Club.

Other memberships are as follows: IWA (the International Water Association), ICOLD (the International Commission on Large Dams), ICID (the International Commission on Irrigation and Drainage), WWC (the World Water Council), INPIM (the International Network on Participatory Irrigation Management), BENA (the Balkan Environmental Association), IHA (the International Hydropower Association).

== Personal life ==
Eroğlu is married and has four children. He speaks English. He has a large number of hobbies and interests, which include the art of marbled paper, swimming, diving, reading and the art of calligraphy. In November 2016, he advised the Turkish mothers to sing new lullabies to support Erdoğans aim to become one of leading economies by 2071, the thousandths anniversary of the Battle of Manzikert.

== Publications ==
Eroğlu is the author of more than 250 academic works, including scientific and technical reports, books and conference papers.
