= Mehmet Taytak =

Turkish businessman and politician

Mehmet Taytak MP

Member of the Grand National Assembly
- Incumbent
- Assumed office 7 July 2018
- Constituency: Afyonkarahisar (2018, 2023)

Personal details
- Born: 7 December 1959 (age 65); Bolvadin, Afyonkarahisar Province, Turkey
- Political party: Nationalist Movement Party
- Education: Gazi University

Mehmet Taytak (born 7 December 1959) is a Turkish businessman and politician. He was an MP from Afyonkarahisar in the 27th and 28th terms of the Grand National Assembly of Turkey.

== Biography ==
Born in 1959 in Bolvadin, Afyonkarahisar, he completed his primary, secondary and high school education in Bolvadin. Since 1975, he took part in the Grey Wolves.

He completed his higher education at Gazi University, Faculty of Technical Education. Between 1984 and 1987, he worked as an instructor in the Metal Works Department of Tomarza Vocational High School in Kayseri.

=== Political career ===
Since 1988, he took part in the Nationalist Movement Party. He served in the Central Executive Board of the Nationalist Task Party (MÇP) (1988–1991), the Central Disciplinary Board of the Nationalist Movement Party (2000–2003), and the Central Executive Board (2003–2009). In 2009–2011, he was the MHP's deputy secretary general in charge of political and social affairs and protocol affairs. Taytak resigned from the party in 2011, and became a member of the MHP Central Executive Board again in 2018.

In the 27th and 28th terms of the Grand National Assembly of Turkey, he entered parliament as a deputy for Afyonkarahisar.
