= 1938 in Turkey =

- Centuries: 20th; 21st
- Decades: 1920s; 1930s; 1940s; 1950s
- See also: List of years in Turkey

Events in the year 1938 in Turkey.

== Parliament ==
- 5th Parliament of Turkey

== Incumbents ==
- President

Kemal Atatürk (up to 10 November)
İsmet İnönü (from 10 November)

- Prime Minister – Celâl Bayar

== Ruling party and the main opposition ==
- Ruling party – Republican People's Party (CHP)

== Cabinet ==
- 9th government of Turkey (up to 11 November)
- 10th government of Turkey (from 11 November)

== Events ==
- 31 March – First public statement about Atatürks's health
- 14 April – Konak Terminal a busy ferry terminal in İzmir was opened
- 19 April – 1938 Kırşehir earthquake
- 20 May – Atatürk's last national tour (to Mersin), he stressed on the Hatay question
- 5 July – Turkish army in Hatay (by treaty)
- 2 September – The Hatay Republic was founded, Tayfur Sökmen was elected as the Hatay president
- 28 October – Ankara Radio began broadcasting
- 10 November – Atatürk died
- 11 November –

İsmet İnönü was elected as the new president
New government

- 31 December – By elections

== Births ==
- 1 January –
  - Birol Pekel, footballer
  - Halit Akçatepe, actor
- 27 March – Kartal Tibet, actor
- 28 March – Genco Erkal, theatre actor
- 31 March – Ahmet Ayık, wrestler
- 17 May – Emine Işınsu, writer (died 2021)
- 12 June – Erol Sabancı, industrialist
- 1 July – Yalçın Küçük, writer, historian
- 20 July – Deniz Baykal, politician
- 1 October – Tunç Başaran, film director
- 10 November – Ogün Altıparmak, footballer
- 31 December – Berkant Akgürgen, singer

== Deaths ==
- 30 January - Mehmed Ziyaeddin (born in 1873), Ottoman dynasty member
- 13 March - Cevat Çobanlı (born in 1870), retired general
- 23 September - Kâzım İnanç (born in 1880), soldier, politician
- 10 November - Kemal Atatürk (born in 1881), President of Turkey

== Gallery ==
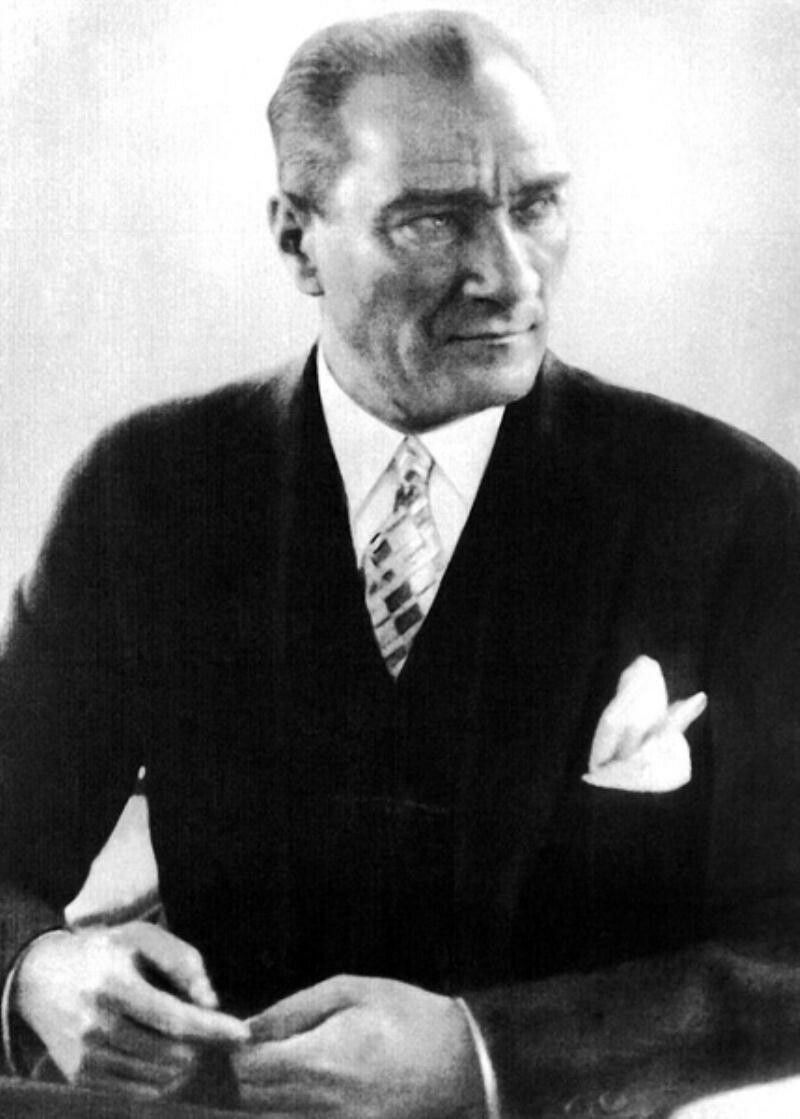
Kemal Atatürk

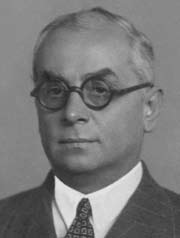
Celâl Bayar

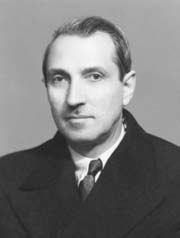
Tayfur Sökmen

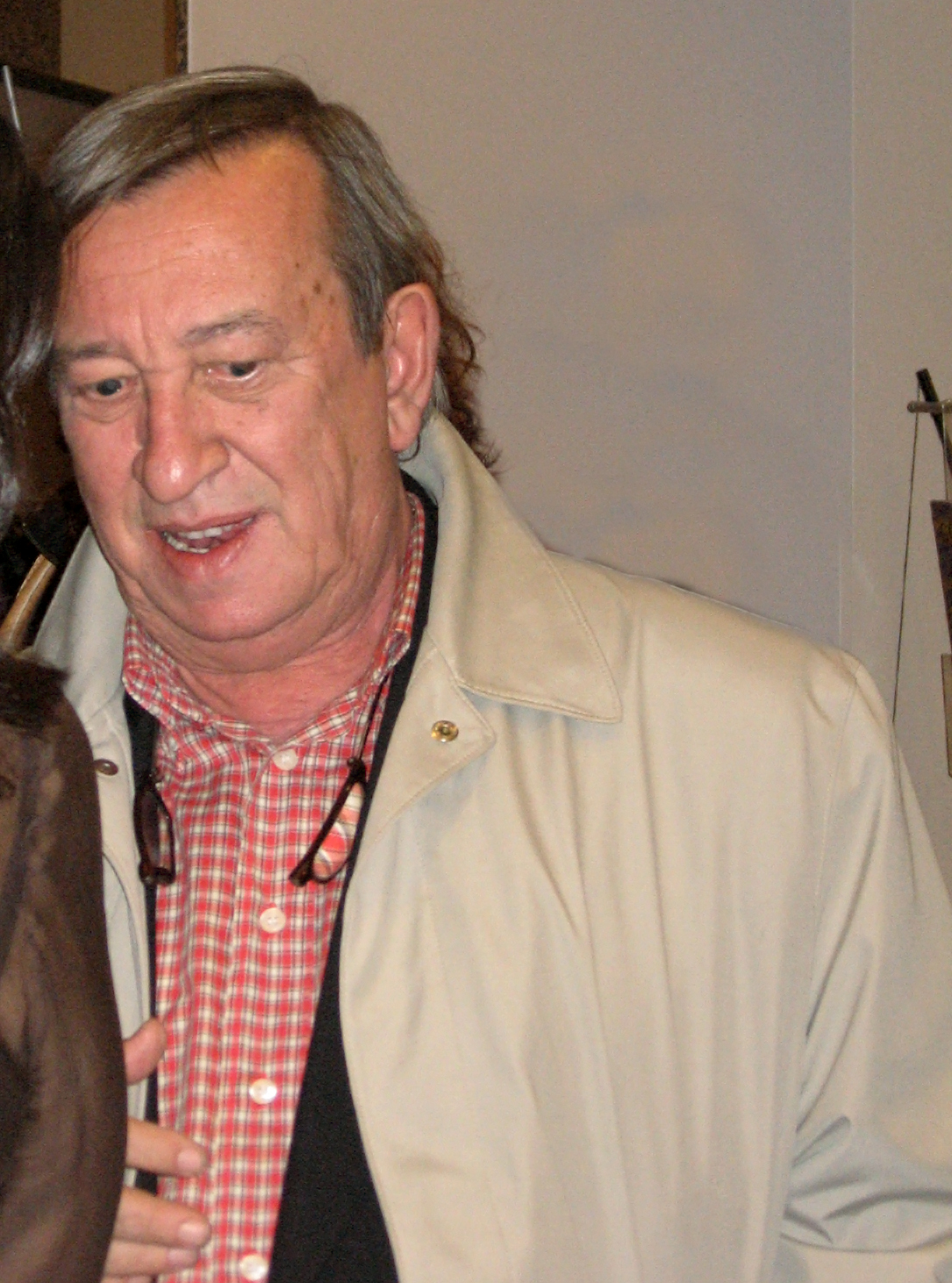
Tunç Başaran

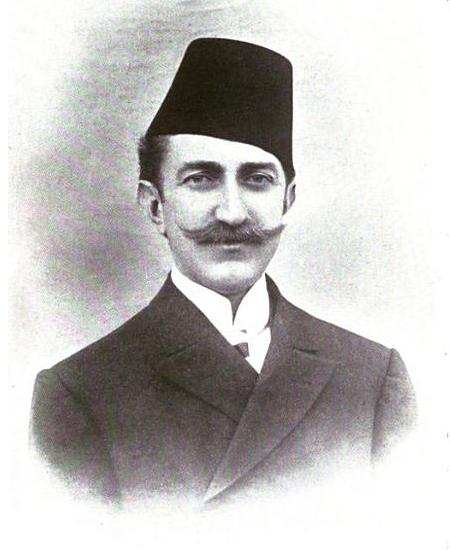
Mehmet Ziyaeddin

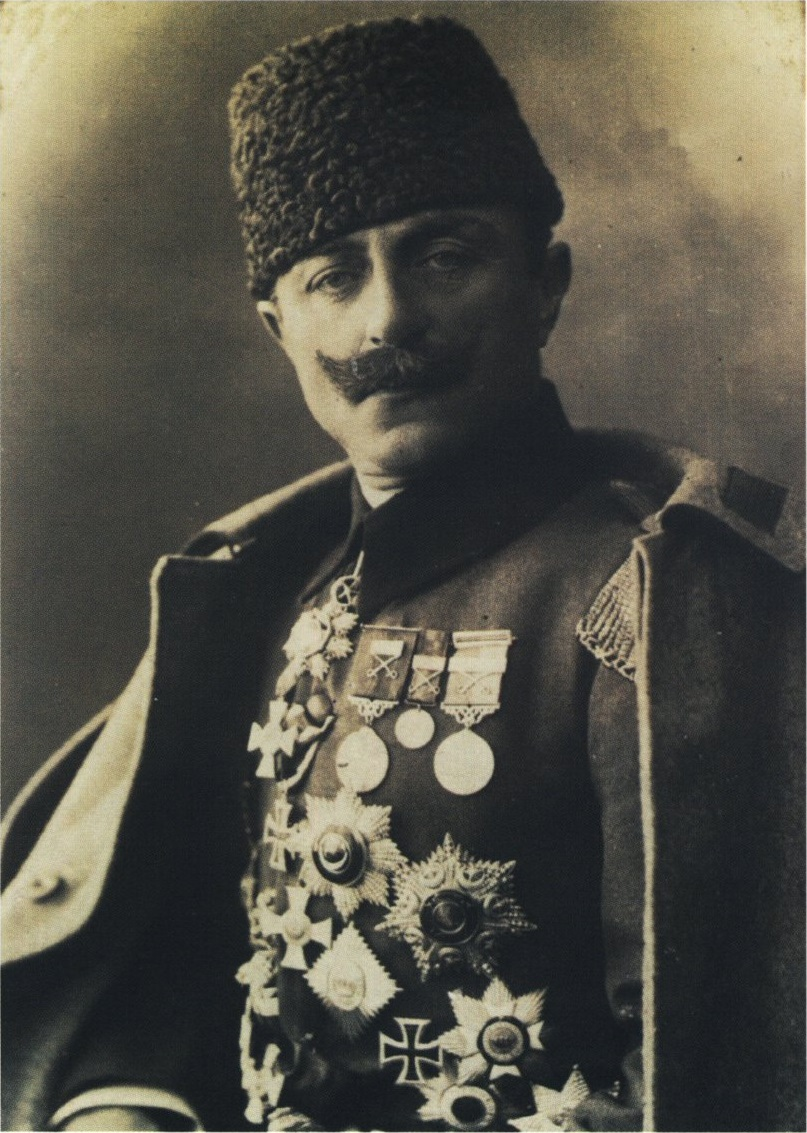
Cevat Çobanlı

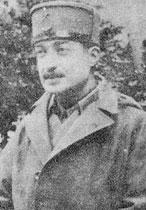
Kâzım İnanç
