= Ahmet Toptaş =

Turkish politician (1949–2022)

Member of the Grand National Assembly
- In office 12 June 2011 – 7 June 2015
- Constituency: Afyonkarahisar (2011)

Personal details
- Born: 3 February 1949 Ekinova, Afyonkarahisar, Turkey
- Died: 11 September 2022 (aged 73) Ankara, Turkey
- Party: Republican People's Party (CHP)
- Education: Ankara University
- Occupation: Politician
- Profession: Lawyer, teacher

Ahmet Toptaş (3 February 1949 – 11 September 2022) was a Turkish politician from the Republican People's Party (CHP), who served as a Member of Parliament for Afyonkarahisar.

== Early life and career ==
Ahmet Toptaş was born on 3 February 1949. He attended Ankara University where he graduated with a degree in law. Toptaş worked as a High School chemistry teacher and worked as a freelance lawyer from 1981 until his election to parliament in 2011.

== Political career ==
Toptaş ran in the 2011 parliamentary elections in Afyonkarahisar for the CHP where he was placed first on the list, and was subsequently elected as the lone CHP MP from Afyon. Toptaş ran for reelection in 2015, but was defeated in the CHP primary losing the first place list position to Burcu Köksal and placing last on the list for Afyonkarahisar overall. He subsequently withdrew his candidacy.

Toptaş died from lymphoma on 11 September 2022, at the age of 73.

== See also ==
- 24th Parliament of Turkey
