= Hatice Dudu Özkal =

Turkish politician (born 1966)

Hatice Dudu Özkal MP

Member of the Grand National Assembly
- In office 1 November 2015 – 7 July 2018
- Constituency: Afyonkarahisar (November 2015)

Personal details
- Born: 13 September 1966 (age 60) Afyonkarahisar, Turkey
- Party: Justice and Development Party (AK Party) (2009-2020), Democracy and Progress Party (DEVA) (2020–present)
- Education: Ankara University
- Occupation: Theologian, politician

Hatice Dudu Özkal (born 13 September 1966) is a Turkish theologian, and politician. She served as an MP in the Turkish Grand Assembly with the Justice and Development Party (AK Party).

Özkal was born on 13 September 1966 in Bolvadin in Afyonkarahisar Province, Turkey. She completed her higher education in Islamic theology at the Ankara University. Between 1992 and 2000, she worked as a teacher at Afyon Anadolu Imam-Hatip High School. After the 2009 local elections, Özkal served as an Afyonkarahisar Municipal Councillor. She was elected as an AK Party Member of Parliament for Afyonkarahisar in the November 2015 general election.

Özkal is one of the founding members of Ali Babacan's newly formed Democracy and Progress Party.

Hatice Dudu Özkal is married, and has three children.

== See also ==
- 26th Parliament of Turkey
