= Remziye Sıvacı =

Turkish politician (born 1965)

Member of the Grand National Assembly
- In office 7 June 2015 – 1 November 2015
- Constituency: Afyonkarahisar (June 2015)

Personal details
- Born: January 1, 1965 (age 61) Malatya, Turkey
- Party: Justice and Development Party (AKP)
- Education: Selçuk University
- Occupation: Politician

Remziye Sıvacı (born 1 January 1965) is a Turkish politician from the Justice and Development Party (AKP), who has served as a Member of Parliament for Afyonkarahisar in 2015.

== Early life and career ==
Remziye Sıvacı was born on 20 April 1970 in Malatya, completing her primary and high school education in Eskişehir in 1973. She graduated from Selçuk University Faculty of medicine in 1991. In 1999, she became a deputy Docent at Afyon Kocatepe University Faculty of Medicine in Afyonkarahisar. She became a Docent at this University in 2006.

In 2008, she worked at the cardiovascular anesthesia department of Charite University Faculty of Medicine in Berlin, Germany. She worked in the same position in Otto-van-Guericke University in Magdeburg in 2010. She became an expert in algology in 2011, working at the Robotic cardiovascular anaesthesia department of the Cleveland Clinic in the United States in 2010. She became a Professor in the Afyon Kocatepe University Faculty of Medicine in 2012. In 2014, she worked in the Hackensack University Pain and Palliative Medicine Department.

== Political career ==
Having been a member of the Justice and Development Party (AKP) since 2012, Sıvacı was elected as an AKP Member of Parliament for Afyonkarahisar in the June 2015 general election. However she was not renominated for the snap November 2015 election.

== See also ==
- 25th Parliament of Turkey
