= İlhan Erdost =

Turkish publisher (1944–1980)

İlhan Erdost (17 December 1944– 7 November 1980) was a Turkish publisher. He was one of the leftist figures who were killed after the military coup in 1980.

== Biography ==
Erdost was born in Artova, Tokat, on 17 December 1944. He started working after elementary school because of his family’s poverty and World War II. Thereafter, he settled in Ankara with his older brother Muzaffer İlhan Erdost. He started school again there. He adopted Kemalist thinking in his years at high school. After the 1960 Turkish coup d'état, when he was 16, his opinions turned towards the left. Erdost, after high school, entered Ankara University Faculty of Law. At the same time, he worked for Sol Yayınları (Sol Publications), but was not able to finish school. After his brother Muzaffer Erdost was imprisoned on 12 March 1971, he assumed the responsibility of Sol Publications and Onur Publications. In the meantime he married his wife Gül Erdost. They had two daughters.

After the coup d'état on 12 September 1980, he was charged with having and printing banned publications and was taken into custody. The particular book that occasioned the arrest was Dialectics of Nature by Friedrich Engels. He was arrested with his brother Muzaffer on 7 November 1980. The same day İlhan was beaten to death by soldiers in Mamak Prison. He was buried in Karşıyaka cemetery, Ankara.

Leman Sam’s song “Ağıt” was composed for İlhan Erdost. His older brother Muzaffer Erdost, after İlhan Erdost’s death, changed his name to Muzaffer İlhan Erdost.
