= Ahmet Refik Altınay =

Ottoman-Turkish historian and military officer (1881–1937)

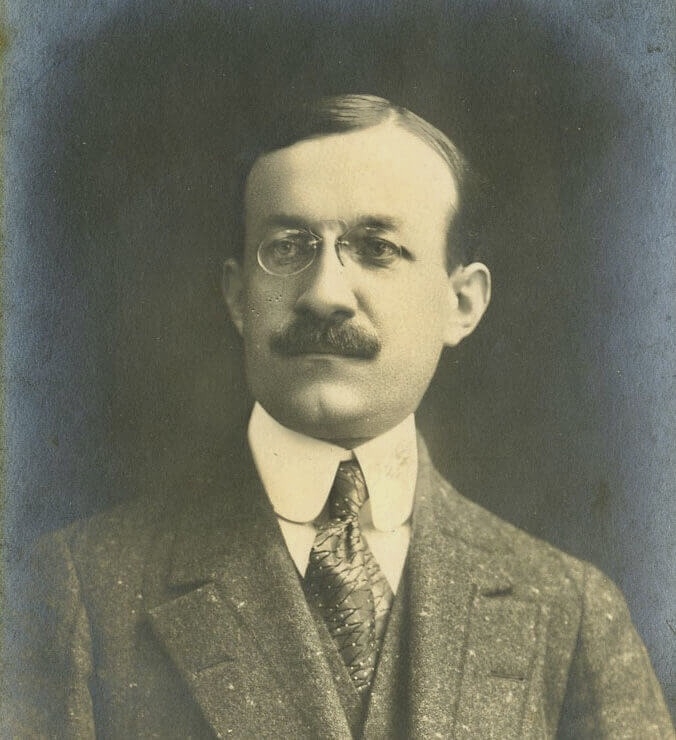
- Born: 1881; Constantinople, Ottoman Empire
- Died: 1937 (aged 55–56); Istanbul, Turkey
- Occupation: professor

Ahmet Refik Altınay (1881 – 1937) was a Turkish historian, academic, writer and poet, who gave history lectures at Darülfünun after the First World War.

== Life ==
Altınay attended Vişnezade Primary School, Beşiktaş Military Secondary School and Kuleli Military School. In 1889 he graduated at the top of his class and joined the military, eventually rising to the rank of captain. As a young lieutenant, Altınay was given teaching jobs instead of being sent out into the field. For four years, he taught geography at the Toptaşı and Soğukçeşme Military Secondary Schools. In 1902 he became a French teacher, and in 1908, a history teacher. In 1918 Altınay began to teach history at the Istanbul Darülfünun, and the following year was appointed professor of Turkish History.

After World War I, Ahmet Refik wrote Two committees two massacres (İki Komite iki Kitâl), an account of the massacres during the War. Though Refik writes about massacres conducted on both sides, he concludes that the massacres against the Armenians were an attempt by the Turkish government to "destroy the Armenians".

Later in life, Altınay worked on the Turkish History Committee, serving as head of the committee from 1924 to 1927. In 1932 Altınay attended the I. History Conference. Altınay was discharged from Darülfünun in 1933. He died in 1937.

== See also ==
- Witnesses and testimonies of the Armenian Genocide
