= Vural Öger =

Turkish-German businessman and politician (born 1942)

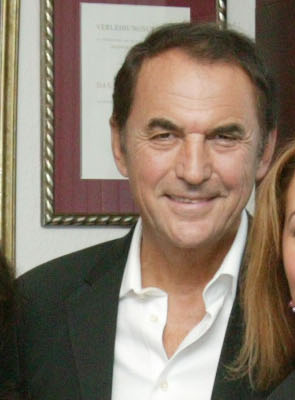
- Öger in 2006
- Born: 1942 (age 83–84); Ankara
- Occupation: Businessman

Vural Öger (born 1 February 1942) is a Turkish-German businessman and politician who served as a Member of the European Parliament from 2004 until 2009. He is a member of the Social Democratic Party of Germany, part of the Socialist Group.

== Life ==
Born in Ankara, Öger is of Turkish descent, but has spent most of his life in Germany. During his time in Parliament, he served on the Committee on Foreign Affairs. He was a substitute for the Committee on Transport and Tourism, a member of the Delegation to the EU-Turkey Joint Parliamentary Committee and a substitute for the Delegation for relations with the Korean Peninsula.

== Biography ==
- 1969: Graduated from Technische Universität Berlin
- 1973: Founded Öger Türktur GmbH
- 1985: Founded Öger Tours (managing director)
- 1990: Öger Company
- 1998: Board Member of the German-Turkish Foundation
- 2000: Member of the Federal Government Immigration Commission

== Decorations ==
- 2001: Order of Merit of Turkey with distinction for special services
- 2001: Bundesverdienstkreuz with ribbon

== See also ==
- Turks in Germany
- 2004 European Parliament election in Germany
