= 13th government of Turkey =

Government of the Republic of Turkey (1942-1943)

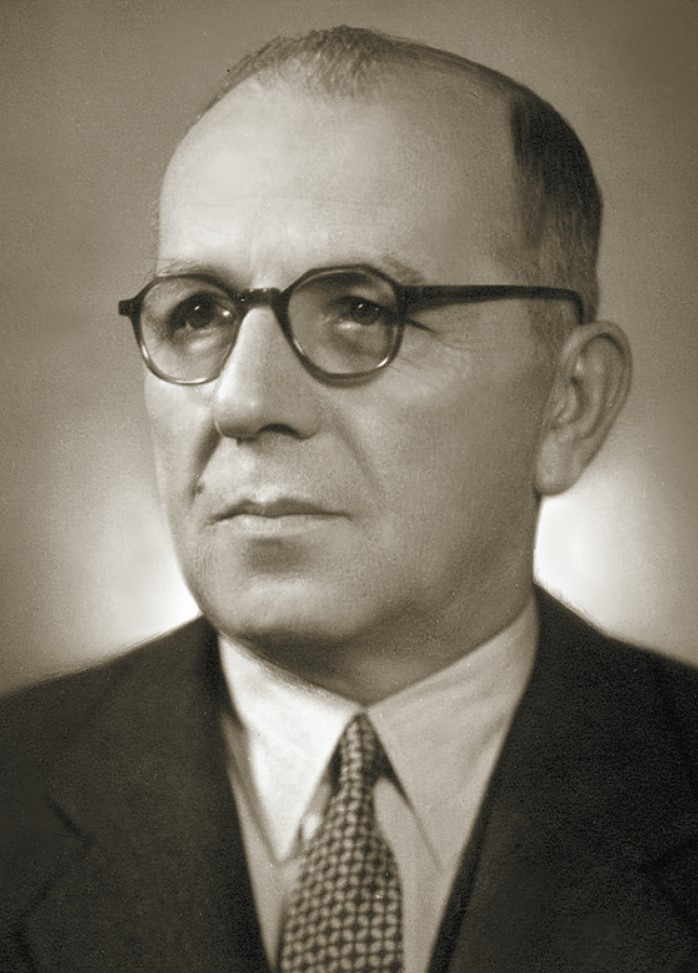
Şükrü Saracoğlu

The 13th government of Turkey (9 July 1942 – 9 March 1943) was a government in the history of Turkey. It is also called first Saracoğlu government.

== Background ==
The government was formed after the previous prime minister Refik Saydam died. Şükrü Saracoğlu of Republican People's Party (CHP), who was a minister in Saydam’s cabinet, was appointed as the new prime minister.

== The government ==
In the list below, the cabinet members who served only a part of the cabinet's lifespan are shown in the column "Notes".

Title	Name	Notes
Prime Minister	Şükrü Saracoğlu	
Ministry of Justice	Sayfettin Menemencioğlu	
Ministry of National Defense	Ali Rıza Artunkal	
Ministry of the Interior	Ahmet Fikri Tüzer; Recep Peker	9 July 1942 – 16 August 1942; 17 August 1942 – 9 March 1943
Ministry of Foreign Affairs	Numan Menemencioğlu	
Ministry of Finance	Fuat Ağralı	
Ministry of National Education	Hasan Ali Yücel	
Ministry of Public Works	Ali Fuat Cebesoy	
Ministry of Health and Social Security	Hulusi Alataş	
Ministry of Customs and Monopolies	Raif Karadeniz	
Ministry of Transport	Fahri Engin	
Ministry of Economy	Sırrı Day	31 July 1941 – 9 July 1942
Ministry of Commerce	Behçet Uz	
Ministry of Agriculture	Raşit Şevket Hatiboğlu	

== Aftermath ==
The government ended because of the general elections held on 28 February 1943.

Preceded by 12th government of Turkey (Refik Saydam)	13th Government of Turkey; 9 July 1942 – 9 March 1943	Succeeded by 14th government of Turkey (Şükrü Saracoğlu)
