= Afyonkarahisar (electoral district) =

Electoral district for the Grand National Assembly of Turkey

Coordinates: 37°50′N 34°45′E

- electoral district for the Grand National Assembly of Turkey
- Afyonkarahisar shown within Turkey
- Province: Afyonkarahisar
- Electorate: 485,000

Current electoral district
- Created: 1923
- Seats: 6 Historical: 7 (1999–2007) 5 (2007–2018)
- Turnout at last election: 89.98%
- Representation
- AK Party: 3 / 6
- MHP: 1 / 6
- CHP: 1 / 6
- DP: 1 / 6

Afyonkarahisar is an electoral district of the Grand National Assembly of Turkey. It elects five members of parliament (deputies) to represent the province of the same name for a four-year term by the D'Hondt method, a party-list proportional representation system.

== Members ==
Population reviews of each electoral district are conducted before each general election, which can lead to certain districts being granted a smaller or greater number of parliamentary seats. Afyonkarahisar's seats fell from seven to five in the 2011 general election.

MPs for Afyonkarahisar, 2002 onwards
Election	2002 (22nd parliament)	2007 (23rd parliament)	2011 (24th parliament)	June 2015 (25th parliament)	November 2015 (26th parliament)	2018 (27th parliament)
MP	Sait Açba; AK Party			Remziye Sıvacı; AK Party	Veysel Eroğlu; AK Party	
MP	Halil Aydoğan; AK Party		Halil Ürün; AK Party		Hatice Dudu Özkal; AK Party	İbrahim Yurdunuseven; AK Party
MP	İbrahim Hakkı Aşkar; AK Party	Veysel Eroğlu; AK Party		Ali Özkaya; AK Party		
MP	Mahmut Koçak; AK Party	Abdülkadir Akcan; MHP	Kemalettin Yılmaz; MHP	Mehmet Parsak; MHP		Mehmet Taytak; MHP
MP	Halil Ünlütepe; CHP		Ahmet Toptaş; CHP	Burcu Köksal; CHP		
MP	Müjdat Kayayerli; MHP	Ahmet Koca; AK Party		No seat		Gültekin Uysal; Democratic Party
MP	Mehmet Telek; MHP	Reyhan Balandı; AK Party	Zekeriya Aslan; AK Party	No seat		

== General elections ==
=== 2011 ===
2011 general election: Afyonkarahisar
Party	Candidate	Votes	%	±%
AK Party	3 elected ▼2: 1. Veysel Eroğlu ✓; 2. Sait Açba ✓; 3. Halil Ürün ✓; 4. Ali Özkaya ✗; 5. Ahmet Koca ✗	257,463	60.42	▲6.70
MHP	1 elected 0: 1. Kemalettin Yılmaz ✓; 2. Öncül Kazancı ✗; 3. Kadir Çalışıcı ✗; 4. Sefa Çetin ✗; 5. Hayvana Gencer ✗	79,425	18.64	▼2.36
CHP	1 elected 0: 1. Ahmet Toptaş ✓; 2. Hatice Gök ✗; 3. Bekir Kasap ✗; 4. Şerif Ceylan ✗; 5. Mehmet Tuğrul Akkuş ✗	70,203	16.48	▲4.14
SAADET	None elected: 1. İsmail Yalçınkaya ✗; 2. Ali Aygün ✗; 3. Ömer Demirsoy ✗; 4. Doğan Bulduk ✗; 5. Ahmet Öztürkavcı ✗	4,825	1.13	▼0.66
DP	None elected: 1. Ahmet Hamdi Kepekçi ✗; 2. Murat Orhan ✗; 3. Yaşar Düzgün ✗; 4. Hacer Keskin ✗; 5. İbrahim Koç ✗	3,104	0.73	▼6.07
Büyük Birlik	None elected: 1. Cemil Çoker ✗; 2. Abdullah Karadağ ✗; 3. Kadir Canbay ✗; 4. Orhan Meral ✗; 5. Mustafa Çınar ✗	2,927	0.69	▲0.69
HAS Party	None elected: 1. Abdurrahman Yalçın ✗; 2. Selda Demir ✗; 3. Hasan Çınar ✗; 4. Mehmet Şenses ✗; 5. Ahmet Kaplan ✗	2,752	0.65	▲0.65
DYP	None elected: 1. Ümit Bilici ✗; 2. Sırma Türe ✗; 3. Ramazan Sunar ✗; 4. Metin Akyol ✗; 5. Mustafa Türkmen ✗	1,299	0.30	▲0.30
DSP	None elected: 1. Hasan Kumdakcı ✗; 2. Akif Öztürk ✗; 3. İlyas Altuntaş ✗; 4. Yılmaz Aksoy ✗; 5. Cengiz Uğur ✗	823	0.19	N/A
HEPAR	None elected: 1. Özkan Bozkurt ✗; 2. Erkan Dinar ✗; 3. Selçuk Akkoç ✗; 4. Asım Avlamaz ✗; 5. Mustafa Karadoğu ✗	803	0.19	▲0.19
Labour	None elected: 1. Sultan Ersöz ✗; 2. Ali Gürbüz ✗; 3. Mustafa Tuncay Doğar ✗; 4. İsmail Gencer ✗; 5. Çağrı Sarı ✗	717	0.17	0.00
MP	None elected: 1. Selahattin Genç ✗; 2. Mehmet Emin Türk ✗; 3. Fatma Sarıkurt ✗; 4. Kamil Alp ✗; 5. Ömer Sarıgül ✗	636	0.15	▲0.15
Nationalist Conservative	None elected: 1. Erdoğan Eriş ✗; 2. Mehmet Altun ✗; 3. Musa Sevinç ✗; 4. Serdar Süleyman Karayaka ✗; 5. Ramazan Başak ✗	559	0.13	▲0.13
Communist_Party_of_Turkey_(today)	None elected: 1. Oktay Yolsever ✗; 2. Ceren Şahnacı ✗; 3. Sedat Tezel ✗; 4. Emşne İncedere ✗; 5. Tuğba Süalp ✗	356	0.08	▼0.08
Independent	None elected: Suat Karaman ✗ Süheyla Bayrak ✗	209	0.05	▼0.27
Liberal Democrat	No candidates	0	0.00	▼0.23
Total votes		426,101	100.00	
Rejected ballots		10,313	2.36	▲0.39
Turnout		436,414	89.98	▼0.12

=== June 2015 ===
Abbr.	Party	Votes	%	MPs
AKP	Justice and Development Party	222,467	52.4%	3
MHP	Nationalist Movement Party	108,175	25.5%	1
CHP	Republican People's Party	71,131	16.7%	1
SP	Felicity Party	9,265	2.2%	0
HDP	Peoples' Democratic Party	4,447	1%	0
	Other	9,399	2.2%	0
Total		424,884		
Turnout		88.56		
source: YSK

=== November 2015 ===
Abbr.	Party	Votes	%	MPs
AKP	Justice and Development Party	273,797	63.4%	3
MHP	Nationalist Movement Party	73,417	17%	1
CHP	Republican People's Party	70,153	16.2%	1
SP	Felicity Party	3,412	0.8%	0
HDP	Peoples' Democratic Party	2,373	0.5%	0
	Other	8,714	2%	0
Total		431,866		
Turnout		89.04		
source: YSK

=== 2018 ===
Abbr.	Party	Votes	%	MPs
AKP	Justice and Development Party	243,613	54.5%	3
CHP	Republican People's Party	63,810	14.3%	1
MHP	Nationalist Movement Party	62,038	13.9%	1
IYI	Good Party	60,706	13.6%	1
SP	Felicity Party	4,965	1.1%	0
HDP	Peoples' Democratic Party	3,382	0.8%	0
	Other	8,841	2%	0
Total		447,355		
Turnout		90.59		
source: YSK

=== 2023 ===
Members of the 28th Parliament of Turkey:

Member	Political party
Ali Özkaya	Justice and Development Party
İbrahim Yurdunuseven	Justice and Development Party
Hasan Arslan	Justice and Development Party
Burcu Koksal	Republican People's Party
Mehmet Taytak	Nationalist Movement Party (MHP)
Hakan Şeref Olgun	Good Party

== Presidential elections ==
=== 2014 ===
2014 presidential election: Afyonkarahisar
Party	Candidate	Votes	%
AK Party	Recep Tayyip Erdoğan	259,377	64.25
Independent	Ekmeleddin İhsanoğlu	138,875	34.40
HDP	Selahattin Demirtaş	5,474	1.36
Total votes		403,726	100.00
Rejected ballots		10,695	2.58
Turnout		414,421	84.33
Recep Tayyip Erdoğan win			
