= Remziye Tarsinova =

Ukrainian dancer (1926–2021)

- Ремзие Тарсинова
- Born: 1926; Simferopol, Crimean Autonomous Socialist Soviet Republic, Russian SFSR, Soviet Union (present-day Ukraine)
- Died: 2021 (aged 94–95); Crimea, Ukraine
- Occupations: Dancer; choreographer

Remziye Üsein qızı Tarsinova (Note: Ukrainian: Ремзіє Усеінівна Тарсінова, romanized: Remziie Useinivna Tarsinova; Crimean Tatar: Ремзие Усеин къызы Тарсинова, romanized: Remziye Üsein qızı Tarsinova) (1926–2021, née Bakkal) (Note: Ukrainian: Баккал, romanized: Bakkal; Crimean Tatar: Бакъкъал, romanized: Baqqal) was a dancer, choreographer and ballet-master.

== Biography ==
She was born on 9 December 1926 in Simferopol, then in the Crimean Autonomous Soviet Socialist Republic and today in the Autonomous Republic of Crimea in Ukraine. Her father was Üsein Baqqal. She died on 7 April 2021 in Crimea and is buried in Abdal Cemetery in Simferopol.

She was awarded People's Artist of the Tajik SSR, Medal "Veteran of Labour", and Merited Artist of Ukraine.
