= Ahmet Fikri Tüzer =

Turkish politician

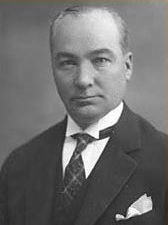

Prime Minister of Turkey Interim
- In office 7 July 1942 – 9 July 1942
- President: İsmet İnönü
- Preceded by: Refik Saydam
- Succeeded by: Şükrü Saracoğlu

Minister of Interior
- In office 6 May 1942 – 16 August 1942
- Prime Minister: Refik Saydam; Şükrü Saracoğlu
- Preceded by: Mehmet Faik Öztrak
- Succeeded by: Recep Peker

Member of the Grand National Assembly
- In office 20 July 1927 – 16 August 1942
- Constituency: Erzurum (1927, 1931, 1935, 1939)

Personal details
- Born: 1878 Şumnu, Ottoman Empire (today Shumen, Bulgaria)
- Died: 16 August 1942 (aged 63–64) Ankara, Turkey
- Party: Republican People's Party (CHP)

Ahmet Fikri Tüzer (1878, Şumnu, Ottoman Empire, today Shumen in Bulgaria – 16 August 1942, Ankara) was a Turkish politician, who was a member of the Republican People's Party and the acting Prime Minister of the Republic of Turkey for two days from 7 July 1942 to 9 July 1942 (during the 12th government of Turkey). He was also the Minister of the Interior from 6 May 1942 to 16 August 1942.
