= 1943 Turkish general election =

- 28 February 1943

All 455 seats in the Grand National Assembly 228 seats needed for a majority
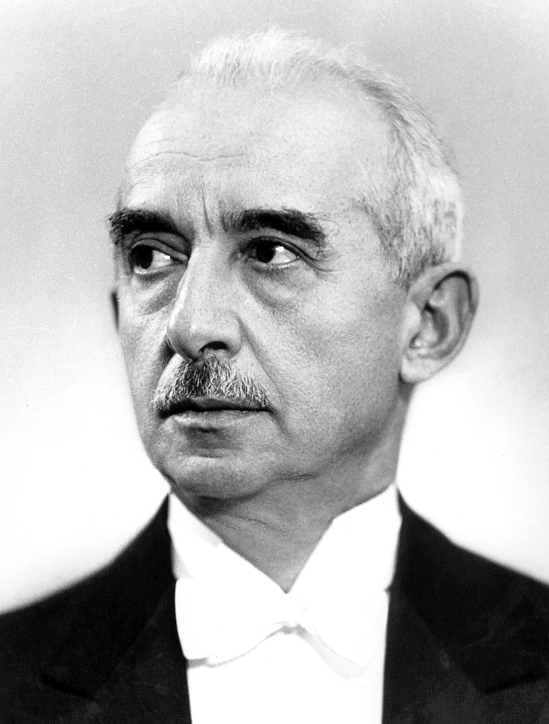
	First party
Leader	İsmet İnönü
Party	CHP
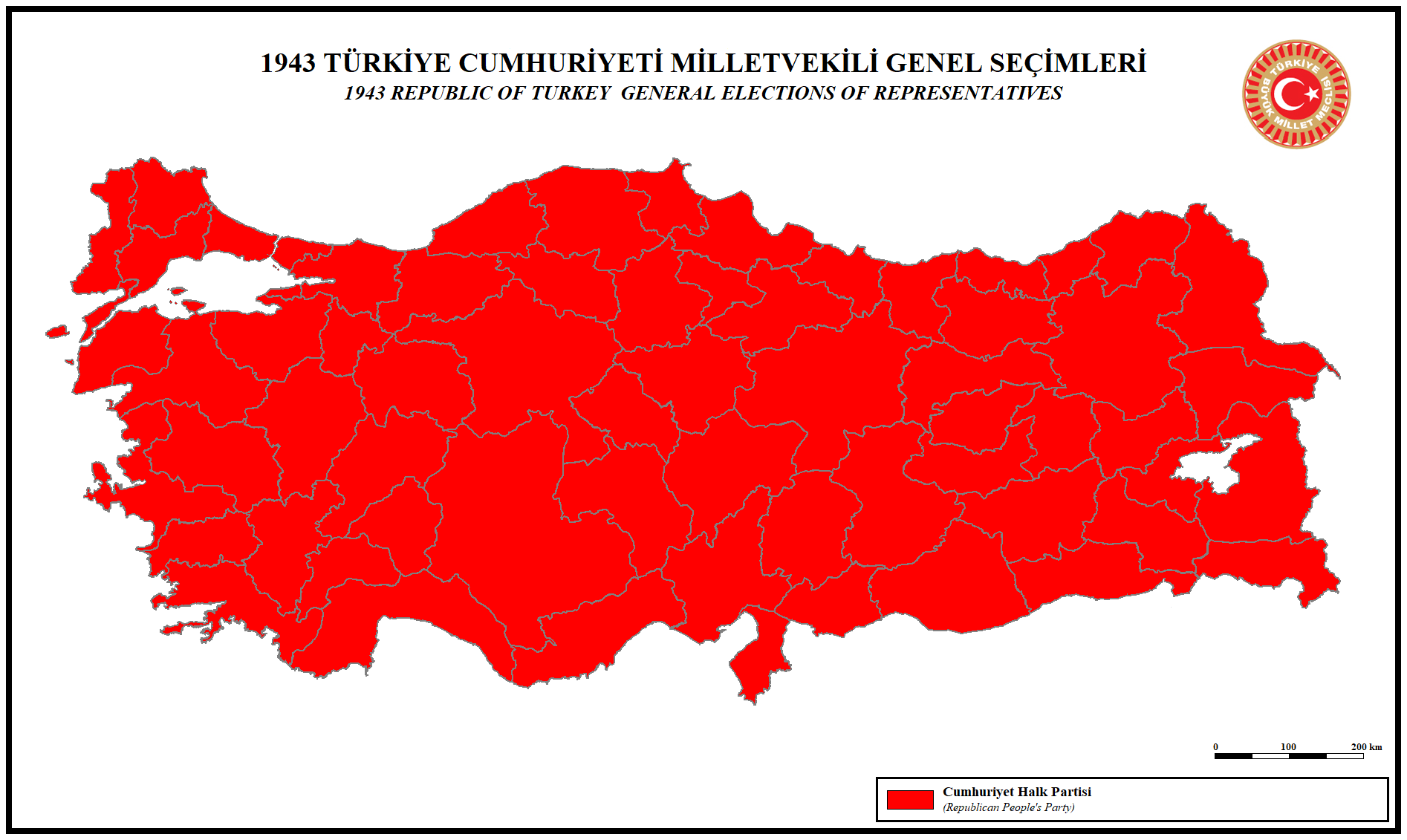
Prime Minister before election
Şükrü Saracoğlu
CHP
Elected Prime Minister
Şükrü Saracoğlu
CHP

General elections were held in Turkey on 28 February 1943. They were the last single-party elections in the country, as the Republican People's Party was the only party in the country at the time.

== Electoral system ==
The elections were held under the Ottoman electoral law passed in 1908, which provided for a two-stage process. In the first stage, voters elected secondary electors (one for the first 750 voters in a constituency, then one for every additional 500 voters). In the second stage the secondary electors elected the members of the Turkish Grand National Assembly. A total of 455 members were elected.
