= 6th Parliament of Turkey =

Grand National Assembly from 1939 to 1943

The 6th Grand National Assembly of Turkey existed from 26 March 1939 to 8 March 1943. There were 470 MPs in the parliament all of which were the members of the Republican People's Party (CHP).

== Main parliamentary milestones ==
Some of the important events in the history of the parliament are the following:

- 26 March 1939 – General elections
- 3 April 1939 – İsmet İnönü was elected as the president of Turkey for the second time
- 3 April 1939 – Refik Saydam of CHP formed the 12th government of Turkey
- 30 June 1939 – Parliament approved merging Hatay Republic to Turkey
- 17 April 1940 – Law 2780 : Village Institutes were established
- 9 July 1942 – Upon Refik Saydam’s death, Şükrü Saracoğlu of CHP formed the 13th government of Turkey
- 11 November 1942 – Law 4305 : Wealth tax (Turkish: Varlık Vergisi )
- 28 February 1943 – General Elections

Preceded by 5th Parliament of Turkey	6th Parliament of Turkey; Abdülhalik Renda; 25 March 1939 – 9 March 1943	Succeeded by 7th Parliament of Turkey
