= Saffet =

Saffet is a Turkish given name mostly for males. People named Saffet include:

- Saffet Pasha, Grand Vizier of the Ottoman Empire
- Saffet Atabinen, Ottoman and Turkish orchestra conductor
- Saffet Arıkan, Ottoman military officer and Turkish politician
- Saffet Sancaklı, Turkish footballer
