= Museum of Anatolian Civilizations =

Museum in Ankara, Turkey

Coordinates: 39°56′18″N 32°51′43″E

- Anadolu Medeniyetleri Müzesi
- Established: 1921; 105 years ago
- Location: Gözcü Street No:2 06240 Ulus, Ankara, Turkey
- Type: Archaeology museum
- Collection size: 194.759
- Visitors: 325.913 (2019)
- Founder: Mustafa Kemal Atatürk
- Director: Yusuf Kıraç
- Website: Official website

The Museum of Anatolian Civilizations (Turkish: Anadolu Medeniyetleri Müzesi) is located on the south side of Ankara Castle in the Atpazarı area in Ankara, Turkey. It consists of the old Ottoman Mahmut Paşa bazaar storage building, and the Kurşunlu Han. Because of Atatürk's desire to establish a Hittite museum, the buildings were bought upon the suggestion of Hamit Zübeyir Koşay, who was then Culture Minister, to the National Education Minister, Saffet Arıkan. After the remodelling and repairs were completed (1938–1968), the building was opened to the public as the Ankara Archaeological Museum.

Today, Kurşunlu Han, used as an administrative building, houses the work rooms, library, conference hall, laboratory and workshop. The old bazaar building houses the exhibits. Within this Ottoman building, the museum has a number of exhibits of Anatolian archeology. They start with the Paleolithic era, and continue chronologically through the Neolithic, Early Bronze, Assyrian trading colonies, Hittite, Phrygian, Urartian, Greek, Hellenistic, Roman, Byzantine, Seljuq and Ottoman periods. There is also an extensive collection of artifacts from the excavations at Karain, Çatalhöyük, Hacılar, Canhasan, Beyce Sultan, Alacahöyük, Kültepe, Acemhöyük, Boğazköy (Gordion), Pazarlı, Altıntepe, Adilcevaz and Patnos as well as examples of several periods.

The exhibits of gold, silver, glass, marble and bronze works date back as far as the second half of the first millennium BC. The coin collections, with examples ranging from the first minted money to modern times, represent the museum's rare cultural treasures.

The Museum of Anatolian Civilizations was elected as the first "European Museum of the Year" in Switzerland on 19 April 1997.

== History ==
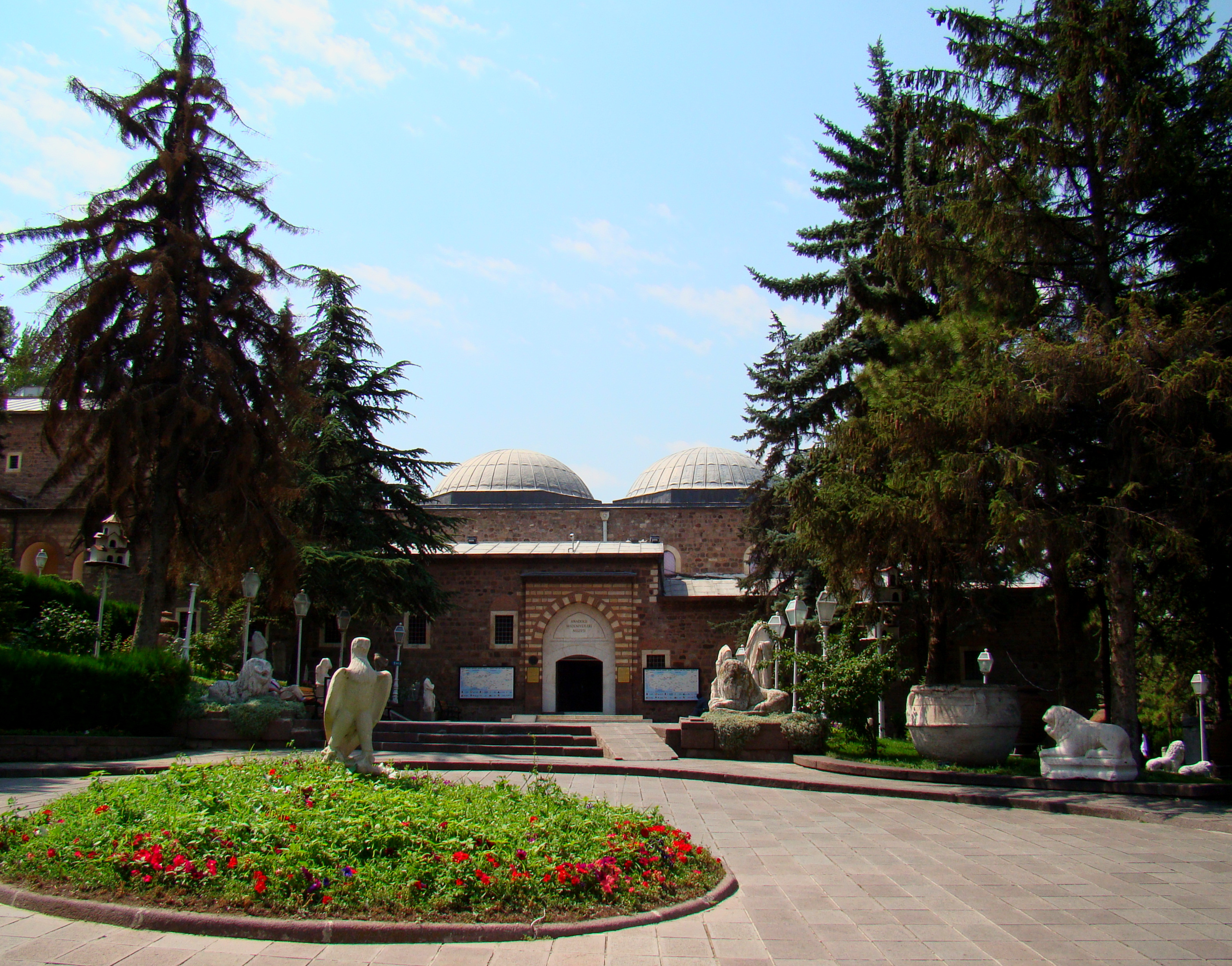
Open square in front of the museum entrance

The first museum in Ankara was established by Mübarek Galip Bey, Directorate of Culture, in 1921, in the section of the Castle of Ankara called Akkale. In addition to this museum, artifacts from the Temple of Augustus and Rome and the Roman Baths of Ankara were also collected. Upon recommendation of Atatürk and from the view of establishing an "Eti Museum" in the center, the Hittite artifacts from the region were sent to Ankara and therefore a larger museum was needed.

The Director of Culture at that time, Hamit Zübeyir Koşay and Saffet Arıkan, Minister of Education recommended that the Mahmut Paşa Bazaar and the Inn be repaired and converted into a museum. This recommendation was accepted and restoration continued from 1938 to 1968. Upon the completion of repairs of the bazaar, where the domed structure is, in 1940, a committee chaired by German Archaeologist H. G. Guterbock arranged the museum.

In 1943, while the repairs of the building were still in progress, the middle section was opened for visitors. Repair projects of this part were carried out by Architect Macit Kural and repair work upon tender was performed by Architect Zühtü Bey. In 1948 the museum administration left Akkale as a storage house, and the museum was in four rooms of Kurşunlu Han the repairs of which were completed. Restoration and exhibition projects of the part around the domed structure were prepared and applied by Architect İhsan Kıygı. Five shops were left in their original form, and the walls between the shops were destroyed and thus a large location was provided for exhibition. The museum building reached its present structure in 1968. Kurşunlu Han, which has been used as an administration building, has research rooms, a library, a conference hall, a laboratory and workshops, and the Mahmut Pasha Vaulted Bazaar has been used as the exhibition hall.

== The buildings ==
The Anatolian Civilizations Museum is in two Ottoman buildings located near Ankara Castle, in the historical Atpazarı district of Ankara. One of the buildings is Mahmut Paşa Bedesteni and the other is Kurşunlu Han (inn, caravanserai).

The Mahmut Paşa Bedesteni was built by Mahmut Pasha, one of the ministers (viziers) of Mehmed II the Conqueror during 1464-1471. The building does not have any inscriptions. In some sources, it is recorded that pure Angora garments were distributed here. The design of the building is of the classical type. There are 10 domes covering a rectangle designed to enclose the location, and there are 102 shops facing each other.

According to historical records and registry books, the Kurşunlu Han was built as a foundation (vakıf) to finance Mehmet Pasha's (Mehmet the Conqueror's vizier) alms giving in Üsküdar, Istanbul. It does not have any inscriptions either. During the repairs of 1946, coins of the Murat II period were discovered. The findings indicate that the Han existed in the fifteenth century. The Han has the typical design of Ottoman Period hans. There is a courtyard and an arcade in the middle and they are surrounded by two-storey rooms. There are 28 rooms on the ground floor, 30 rooms on the first floor. The rooms have furnaces. There is a barn with an "L" type on the ground floor on west and south directions of the rooms. On the north side of the han there are 11 shops and 9 shops on east side and 4 shops facing each other within the garden. The inn (han) was built by Mehmet Pasha and in 1467 Mehmet Pasha was promoted to Prime Minister (Grand Vizier). Upon orders by Mahmut Pasha the vaulted bazaar was built. He kept his position until 1470. He had his mosque, soup kitchen and madrasa in Üsküdar, and his body is buried there.

These two buildings constituting the museum today were abandoned after the fire in 1881.

== Exhibited artifacts ==
- Palaeolithic Age (....8000 BC): The Palaeolithic Age is represented in the museum by the finds uncovered in the Antalya Karain Cave. People of the Palaeolithic Age were hunter-gatherers who used stone and bone tools. The stone tools are displayed under three time categories: Lower Paleolithic Age, Middle Paleolithic Age and Upper and Late Upper Paleolithic Age.
- Neolithic Age (8000-5500 BC) : During this age, the first villages appeared and agriculture began. The artifacts from Çatalhöyük and Hacılar, which are two of the most important sites of the Neolithic Age, are exhibited in this section. The collection includes Mother Goddess sculptures, wall paintings, clay figurines, stamps, earthenware containers, and agricultural tools made from bones. The most impressive parts of this exhibit are a hunting scene on plaster from the 7th millennium BC, a reproduction of a Çatalhöyük room with wall-mounted bull heads, a Mother Goddess Kybele (later Cybele) sculpture, obsidian tools, wall paintings of Mount Hasan erupting, and wall paintings of a leopard.
- Chalcolithic Age (Copper-Stone) (5500-3000 BC): In addition to stone tools, copper was processed and used in everyday life during this age. The artifacts recovered in Hacılar, Canhasan, Tilkitepe, Alacahöyük and Alişar Hüyük are exhibited in the museum. The collection includes a large collection of stone and metal tools, goddess figurines, seals, and decorative jewelry.

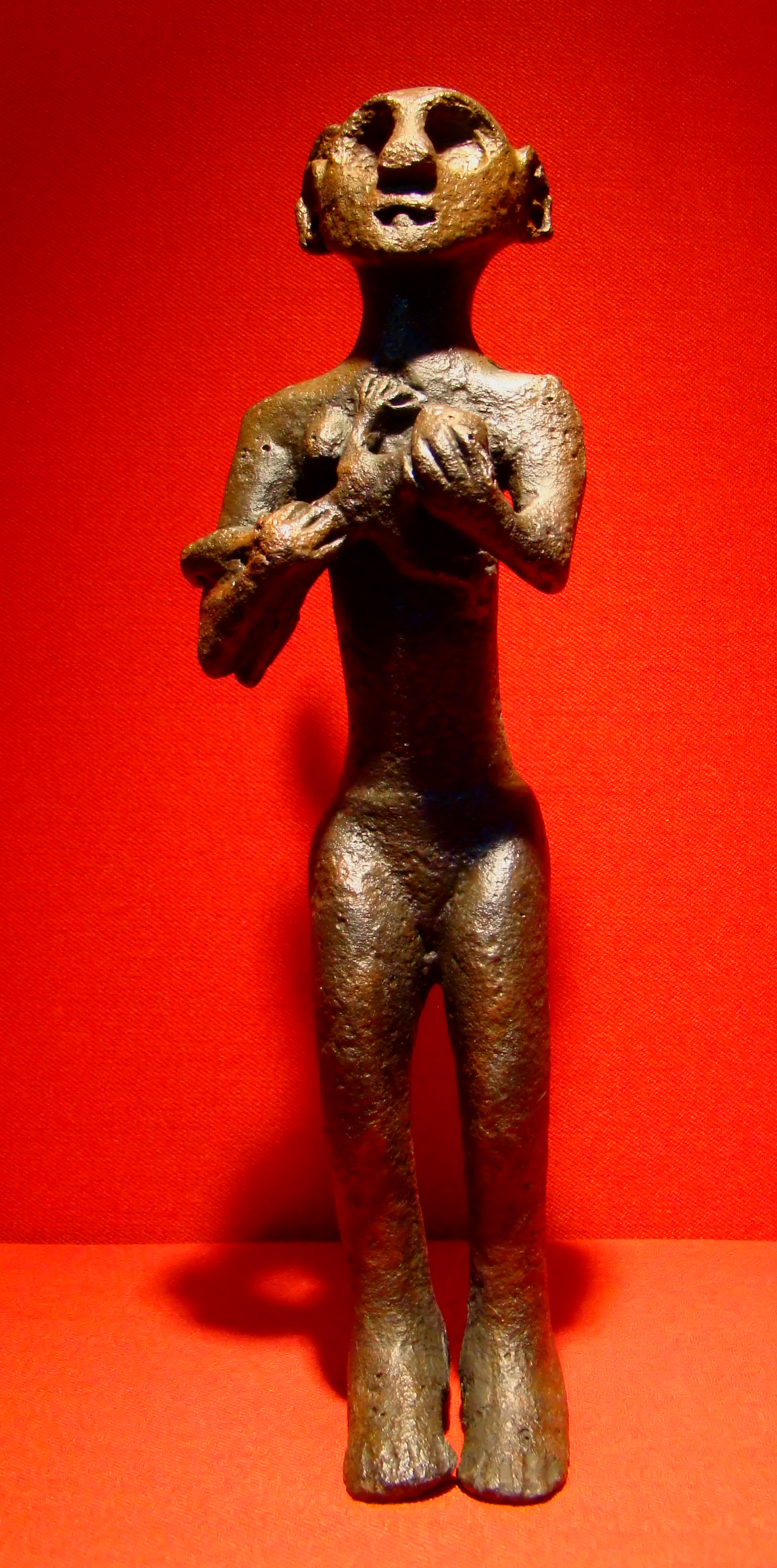
Bronze figurine of a naked woman breast-feeding a baby, from a grave in Horoztepe.

- Early Bronze Age (3000-1950 BC): The people of Anatolia amalgamated copper and tin and invented bronze at the beginning of the 3000 BC. They also processed the known metals with casting and hammering techniques. In addition to valuable metal artifacts buried as grave goods in royal tombs in Alacahöyük, artifacts from Hasanoğlan, Mahmatlar, Eskiyapar, Horoztepe, Karaoğlan, Merzifon, Etiyokuşu, Ahlatlıbel, Karayavşan, Bolu, Beycesultan Semahöyük, Karaz-Tilkitepe are represented in the Old Bronze Age section of the museum. The Hatti tribes dominate the Bronze Age display. The collection includes solar discs, deer-shaped statuettes, thinner version of female figurines and gold jewelry. There is also a reconstruction of a burial ceremony which emphasizes the religious practices of this ancient people.
- Assyrian Trade Colonies (1950-1750 BC): In this period, writing emerged in Anatolia for the first time. Since Akkadian times, Mesopotamians were aware of Anatolian resources and riches. As a result, they engaged in broad trade relations, spearheaded by Assyrians and with them they brought in their languages and cylinder and stamp seals which later was developed into a writing system. Over 20,000 clay tablets, inscribed in Assyrian cuneiform, shed light to this period. Most of the written documents are concerned with trade, economy, and law. Tin, textiles, and clothes were brought by the Assyrian donkey caravans for the local people and these goods were exchanged for silver and gold. Kültepe was the center of the trade network. As a result, we witness an explosion in the diversity of the finds. Cuneiform tablets, drinking vessels in the shape of sacred animals like bull, lion, eagle, boar, rabbit, which were used in religious ceremonies, cult objects, cylinder and stamp seals and their impressions, all kinds of weapons and metal cups of artistic value made of clay, stone, gold, silver, lead, copper, bronze, precious stones and tiles from the Assyrian trade colonies were discovered at Kültepe, Acemhöyük, Alişar and Boğazköy. Another interesting class of finds related to this 200-year period is rhytons of Kultepe, a special group of ceramic art which constitutes the basis of the Hittite culture.

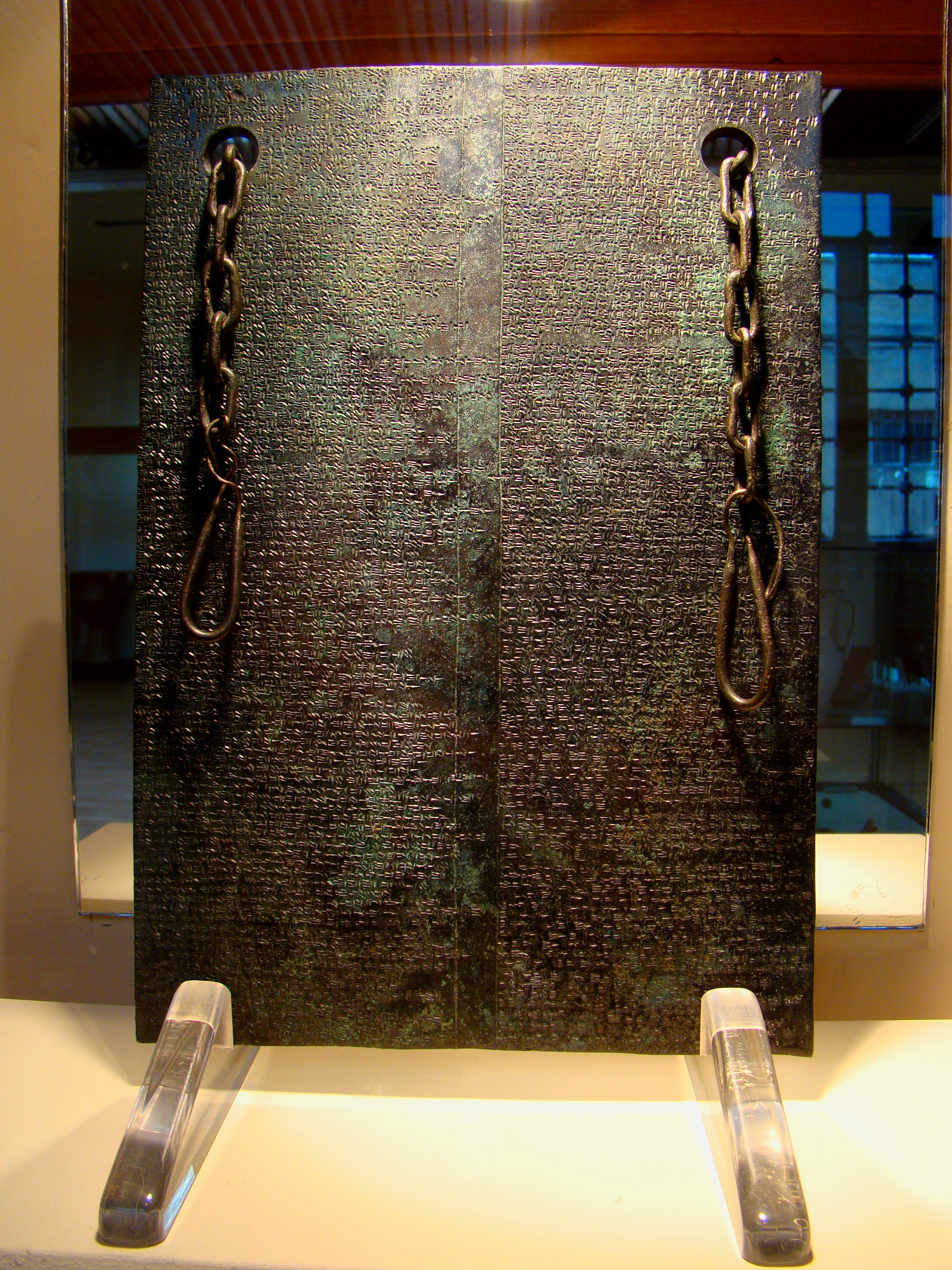
Bronze tablet from Çorum-Boğazköy dating from 1235 BC

- Hittite Period (1750-1200 BC): The ancient Hittites' first political union was established near the crescent of the Kızılırmak River in Anatolia around 2000 BC. The important sites are Boğazköy (Hattusa), İnandık, Eskiyapar, Alacahöyük, Alişar, Ferzant. The highlight of the Great Hittite Empire section is the relief of the God of War taken from the King's Gate at Hattusa. Embossed bull figure containers, various fruit bowls and vases with animal shapes, infamous İnandık vase that depicts a wedding ceremony, tablets of government archives as well as the seals of the kings, bronze statues of fertility gods, bulls, and deer are other interesting displays. The exhibit also includes pictures from Boğazköy, reconstruction of a religious ceremony, reconstruction of King's Gate at Boğazköy and pictures from the excavation at Boğazköy. One of the most important artifacts is the tablet in Akkadian scripts (1275-1220 BC) - a correspondence from Egyptian Queen Nefertari (wife of Ramses II) to Hittite Queen Puduhepa (wife of Hattusili III) written after Kadesh Peace Treaty - the first peace treaty in the world history, dated 1275-1220 BC found at Boğazköy.
- Phrygian Period (1200-700 BC) : The Phrygians, the Sea People, came to Anatolia from the Balkans in 1200 BC. They acquired control over Central Anatolia and made Gordion their capital city. The finds from the royal tumulus at Gordion form the majority of this section. The tumulus measured 300 m (980 ft) in diameter and 50 m (160 ft) in height. The reproduction of the tomb of King Midas, found in the ancient tumulus, is also displayed here. Carved and inlaid wooden furniture, hinged dress pins, ritual vessels, depictions of animals such as lions, rams and eagles, the reconstruction of a burial ceremony and the statue of the Mother Goddess Kybele (to whom the Phrygians worshipped as their main deity) are represented in this section.
- Late Hittite Period (1200-700 BC) : After the fall of the Hittite Empire as a result of the invasion of the Phrygians, some of the Hittites moved to south and south-east Anatolia and established new states. The most important sites of this period are Malatya–Arslantepe, Karkamış (Carchemish) and Sakçagözü. The 10-domed old bazaar forming the center hall of the museum houses reliefs and statues from Neo-Hittite period. The theme of war is emphasized in the reliefs with soldiers and chariots. Also, rock-cut reliefs portraying the Hittite rulers, the gods of the Hittite pantheon, and statues of powerful animals such as lions and bulls are represented.
- Urartian Period (1200-600 BC) : The Urartuans lived in East Anatolia during the same period as the Phrygians. The most important Urartian sites are Altıntepe, Adilcevaz, Kayalıdere, Patnos, Van, Haykaberd. Urartians made new advances in architecture and mining.
- Lydian Period (1200-546 BC) : The origin of Lydian art comes from the Bronze Age in which there were relations, friendly or hostile, between their ancestors and the Hittites. Lydians made spectacular progress in the Iron Age, especially from Gyges period to Croesus (685 to 547 BC). The exhibited artifacts mostly date from the 6th century BC.
- Classical Period and Ankara through the ages: The collection includes Greek, Hellenistic, Roman and Byzantine Period artifacts such as statues, jewelry and decorative vessels made of gold, silver, glass, marble, and bronze as well as coins with examples ranging from the first minted money to modern times. In addition, there is a section displaying the finds uncovered recently from Ankara's surroundings.

== Galleries ==
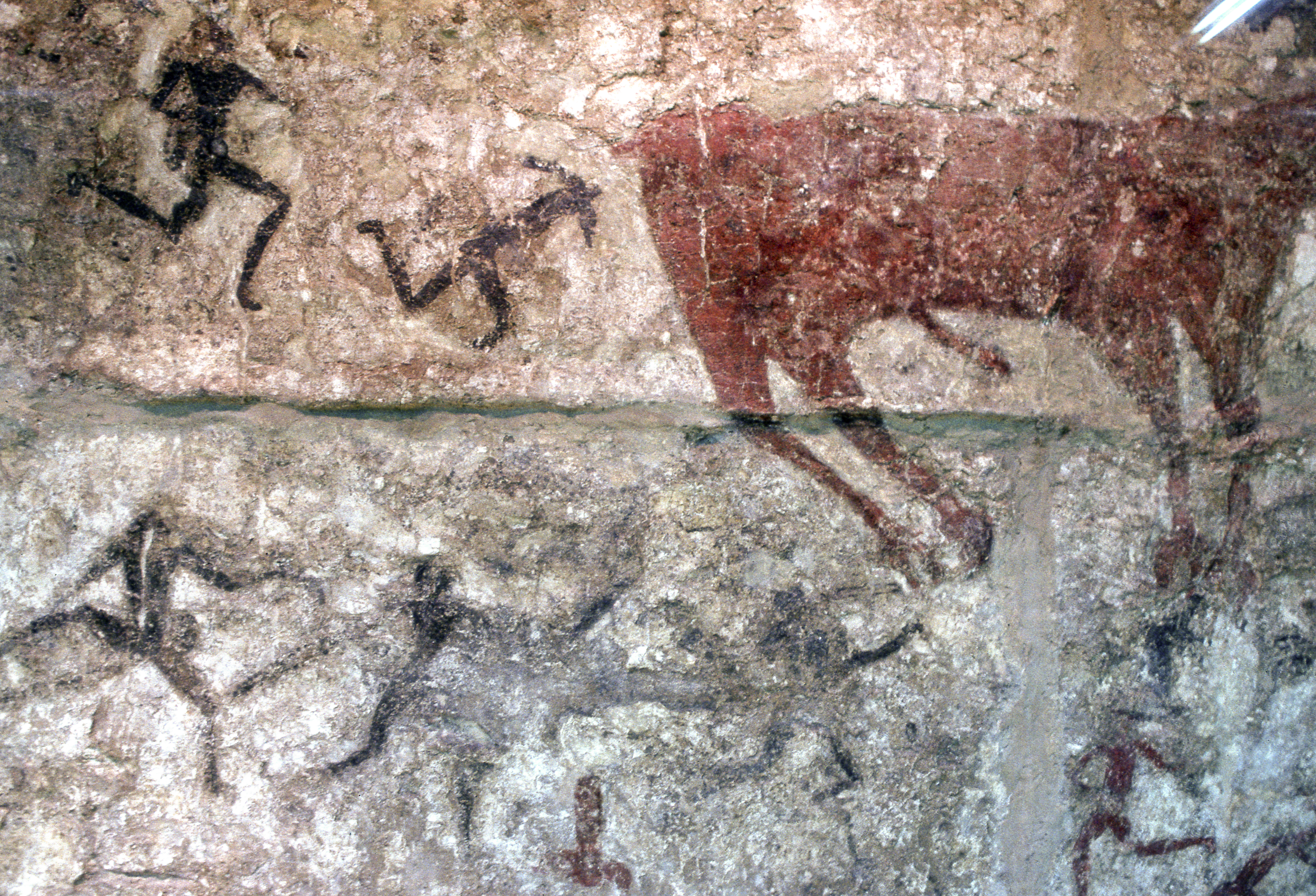
Museum of Anatolian Civilizations Hunt painting

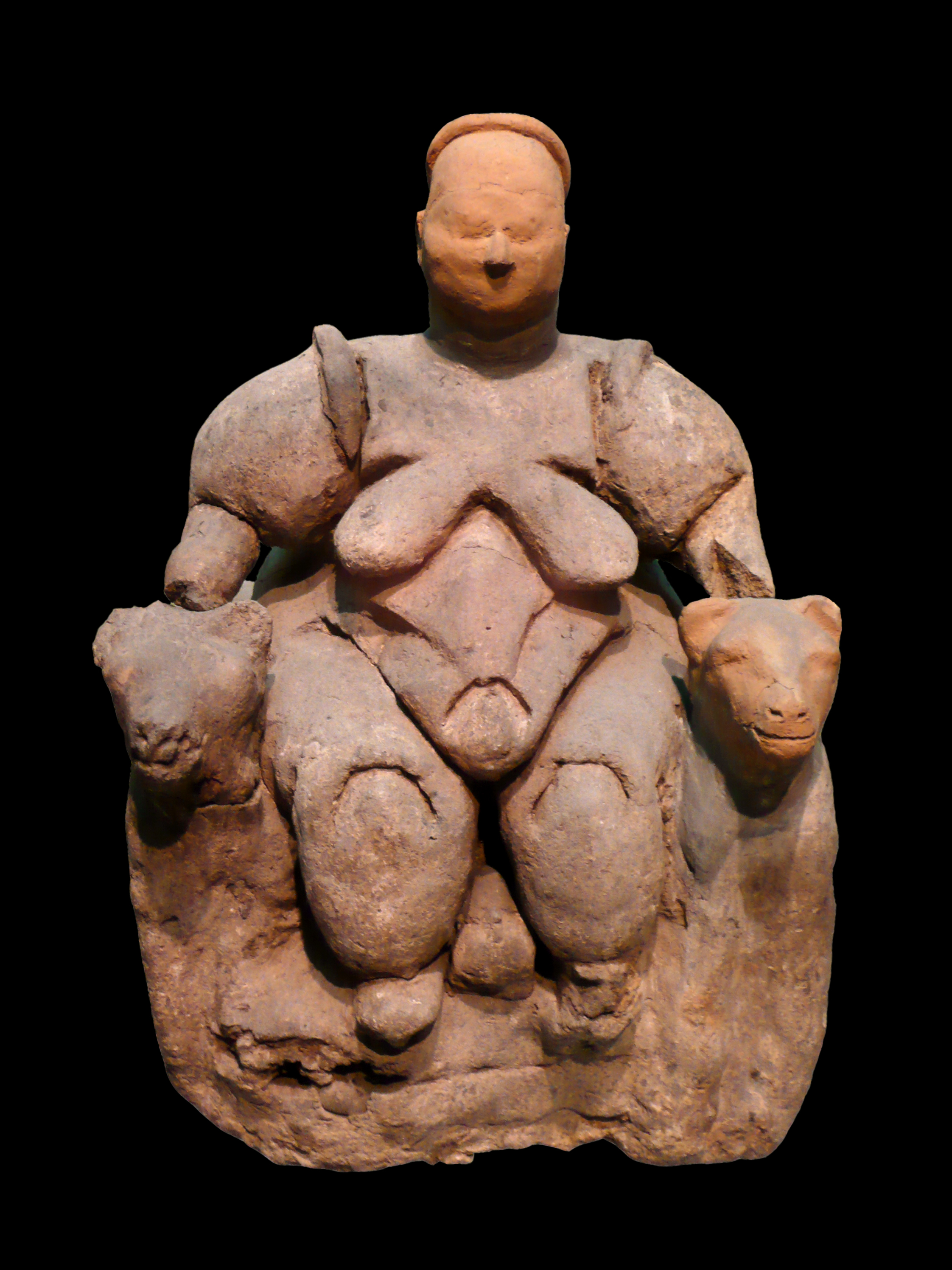
Mother Goddess from Çatalhöyük, frontal view

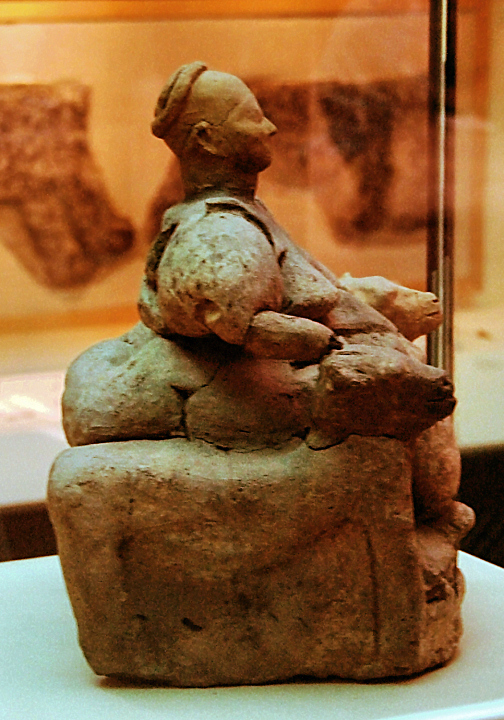
Mother Goddess, lateral view

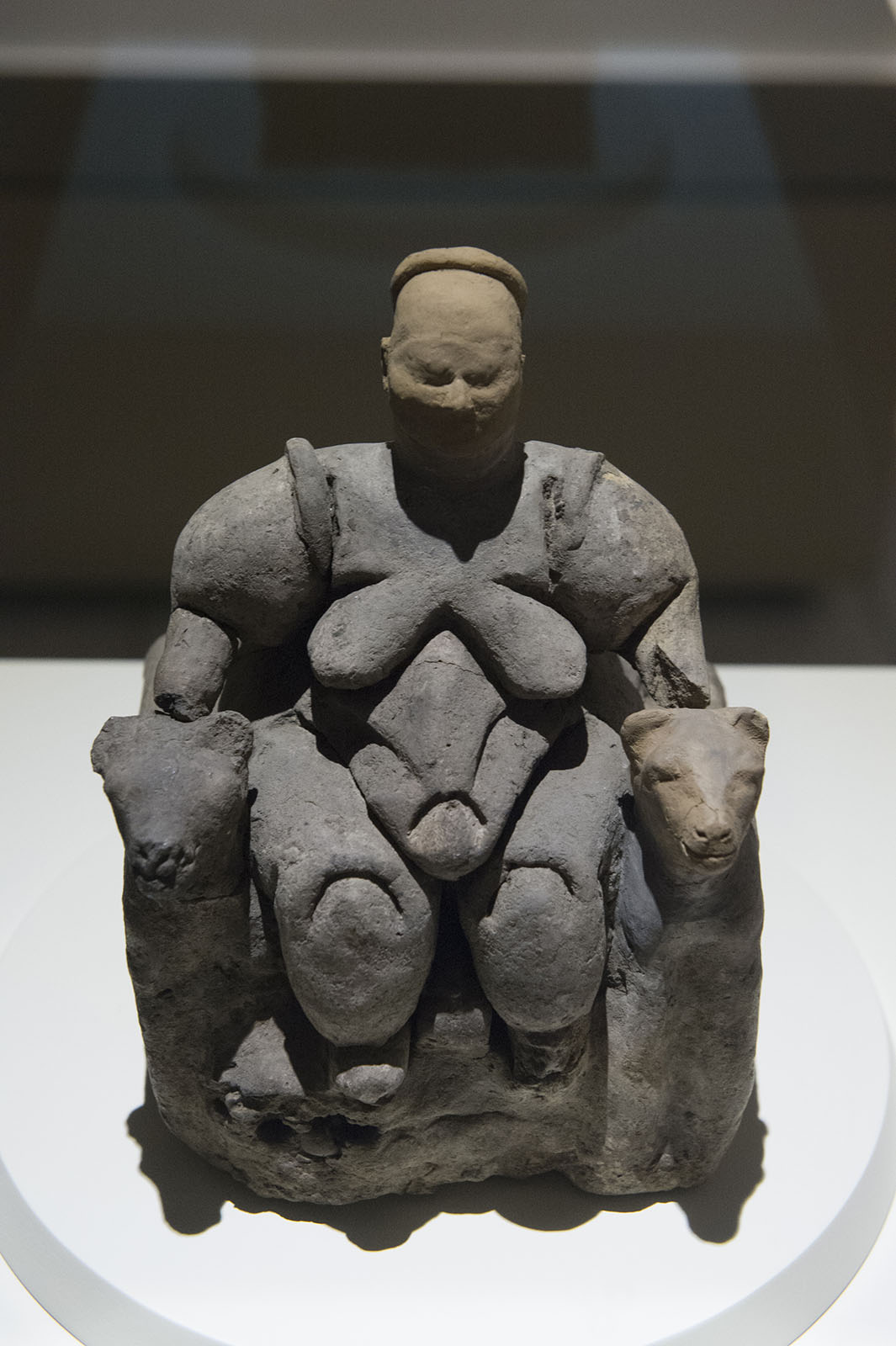
Museum of Anatolian Civilizations Mother Goddess

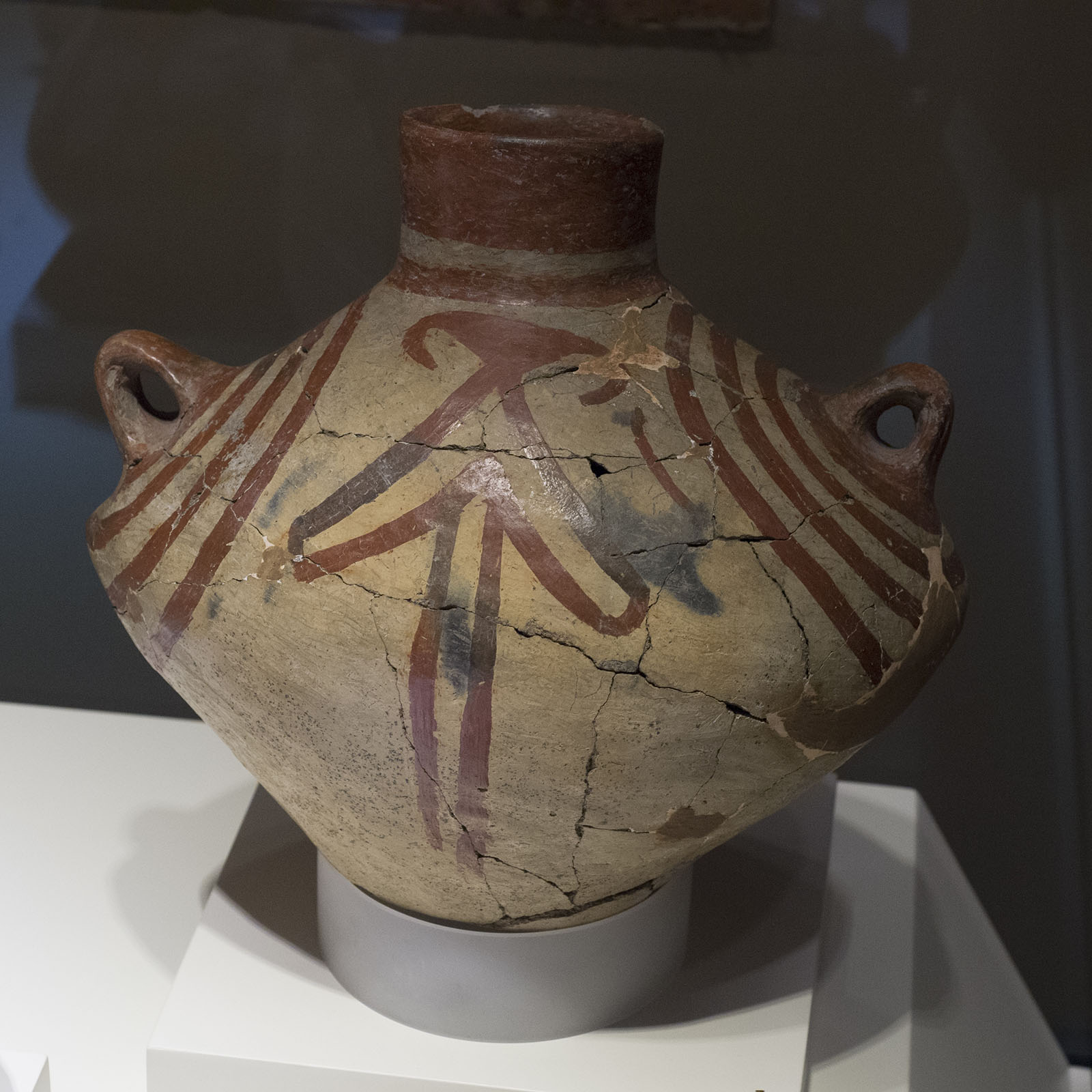
Museum of Anatolian Civilizations Pot

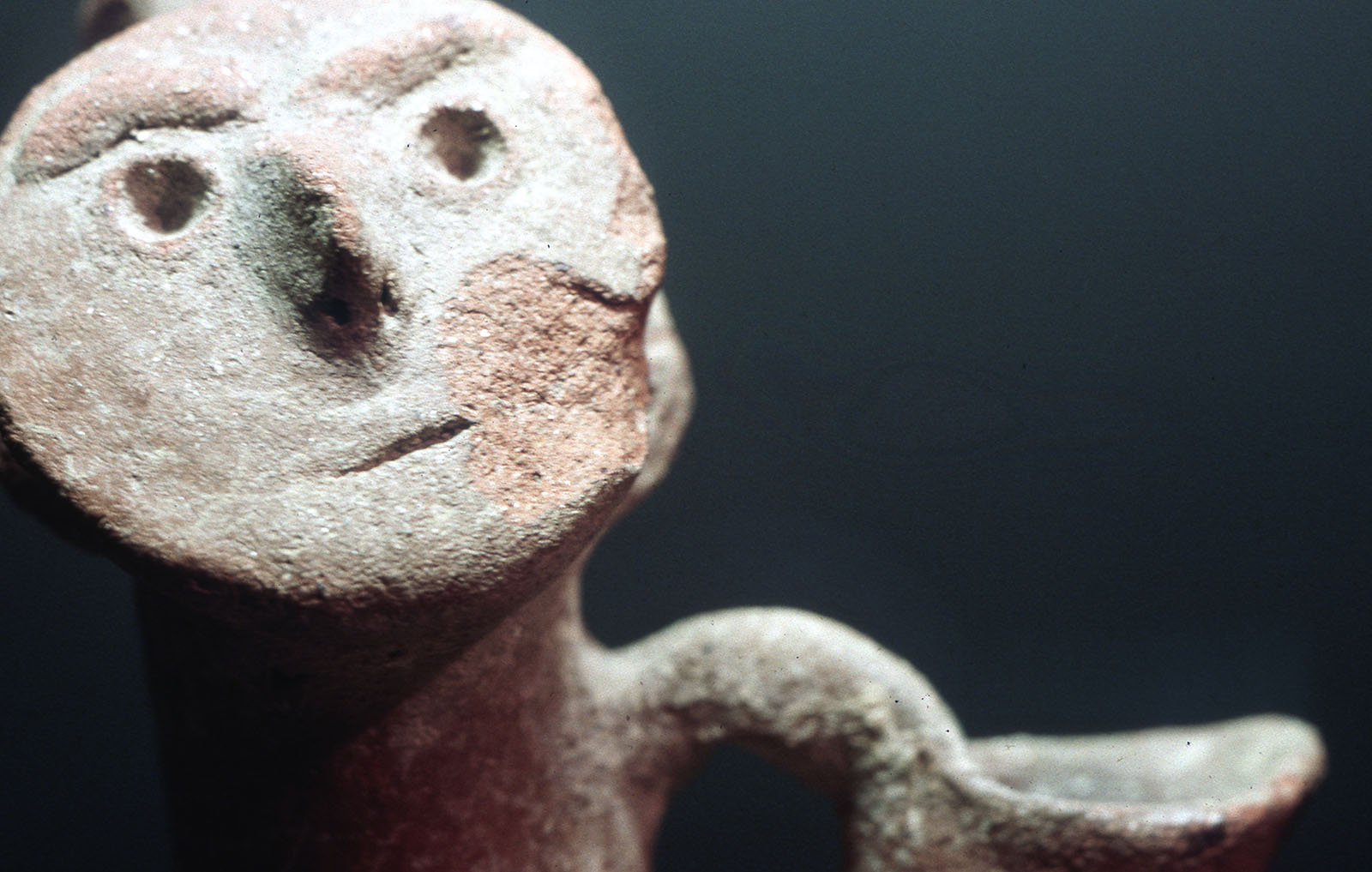
Museum of Anatolian Civilizations Woman on pitcher

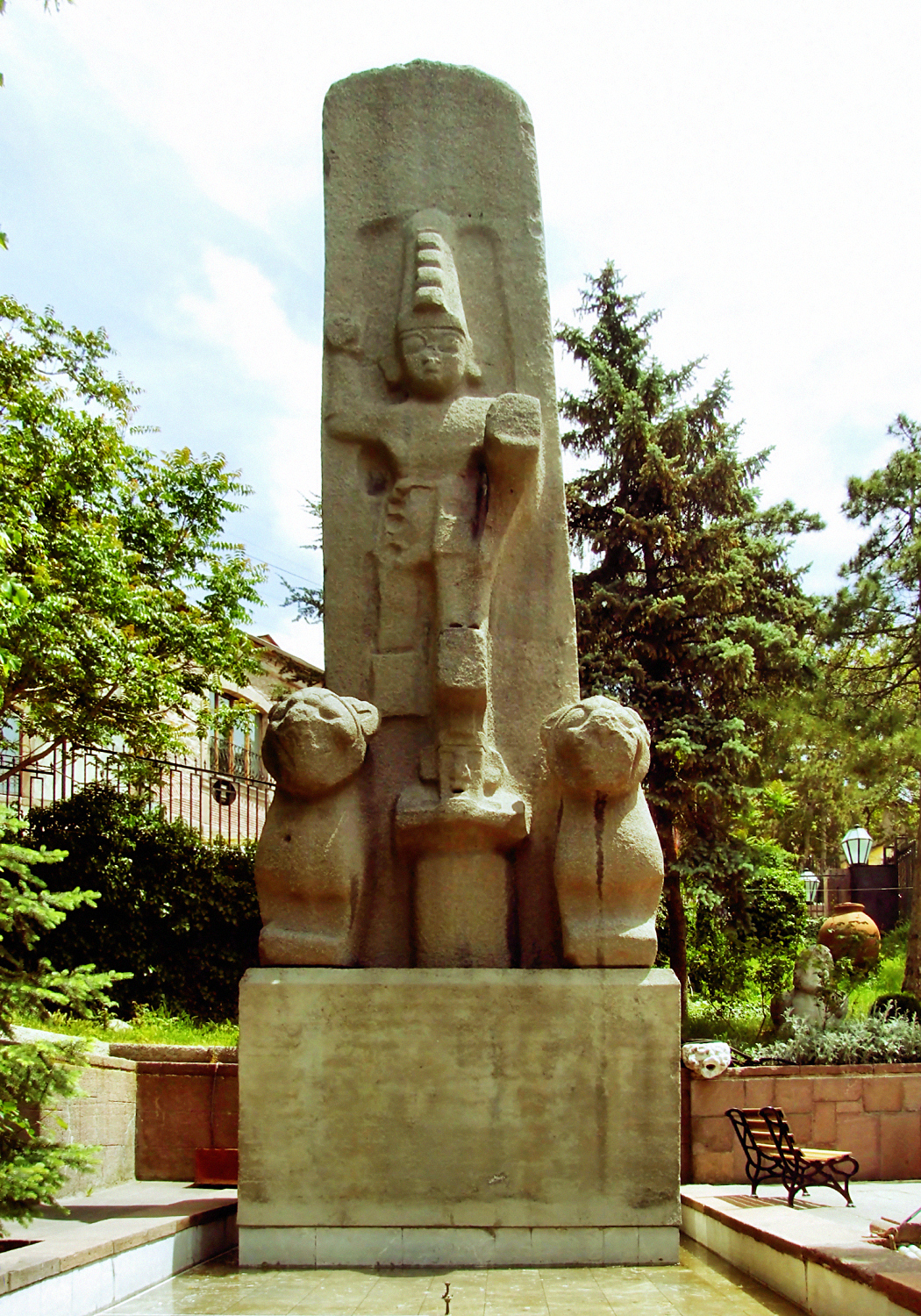
Hittite monument, an exact replica of monument from Fasıllar

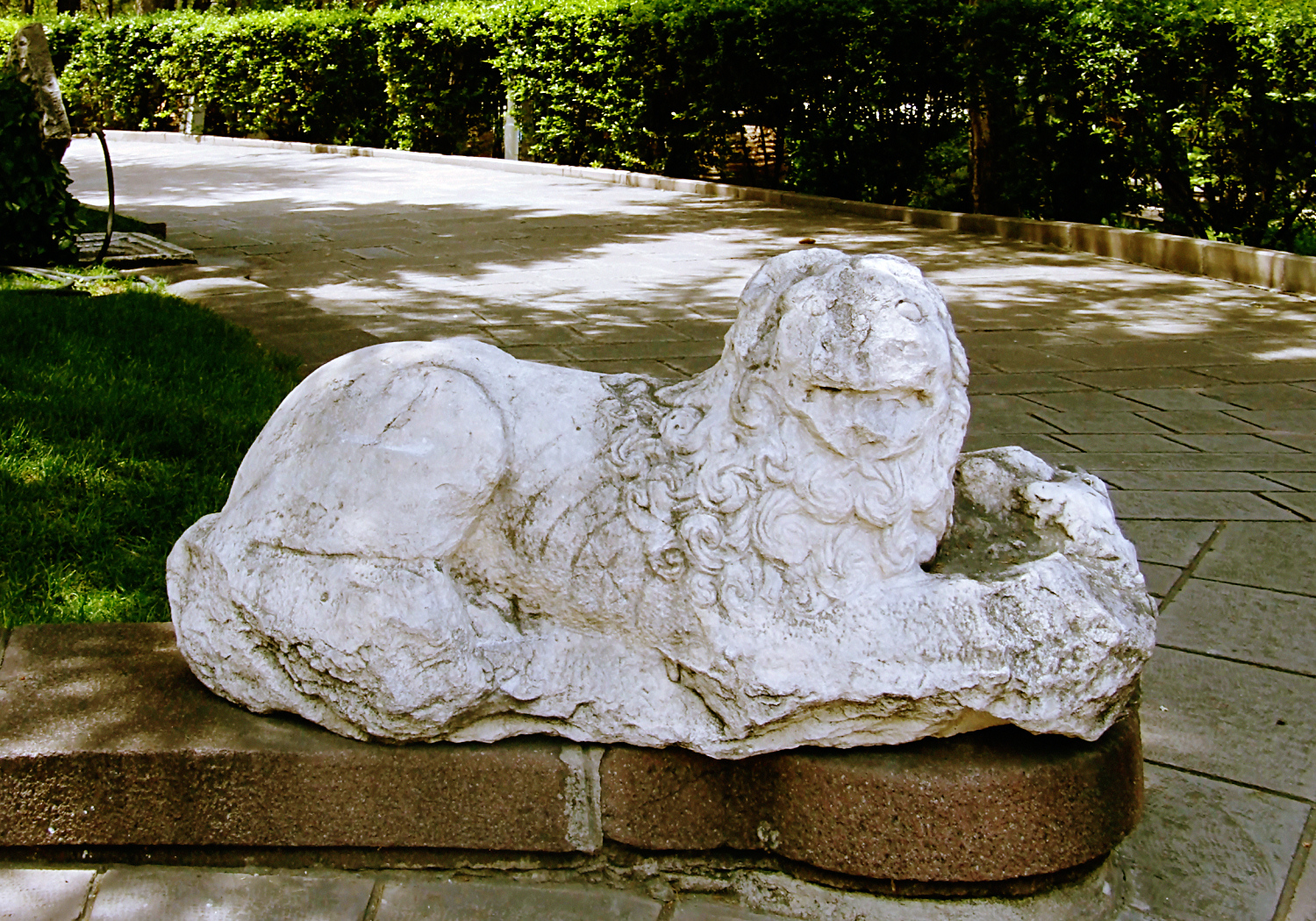
A statue in the courtyard

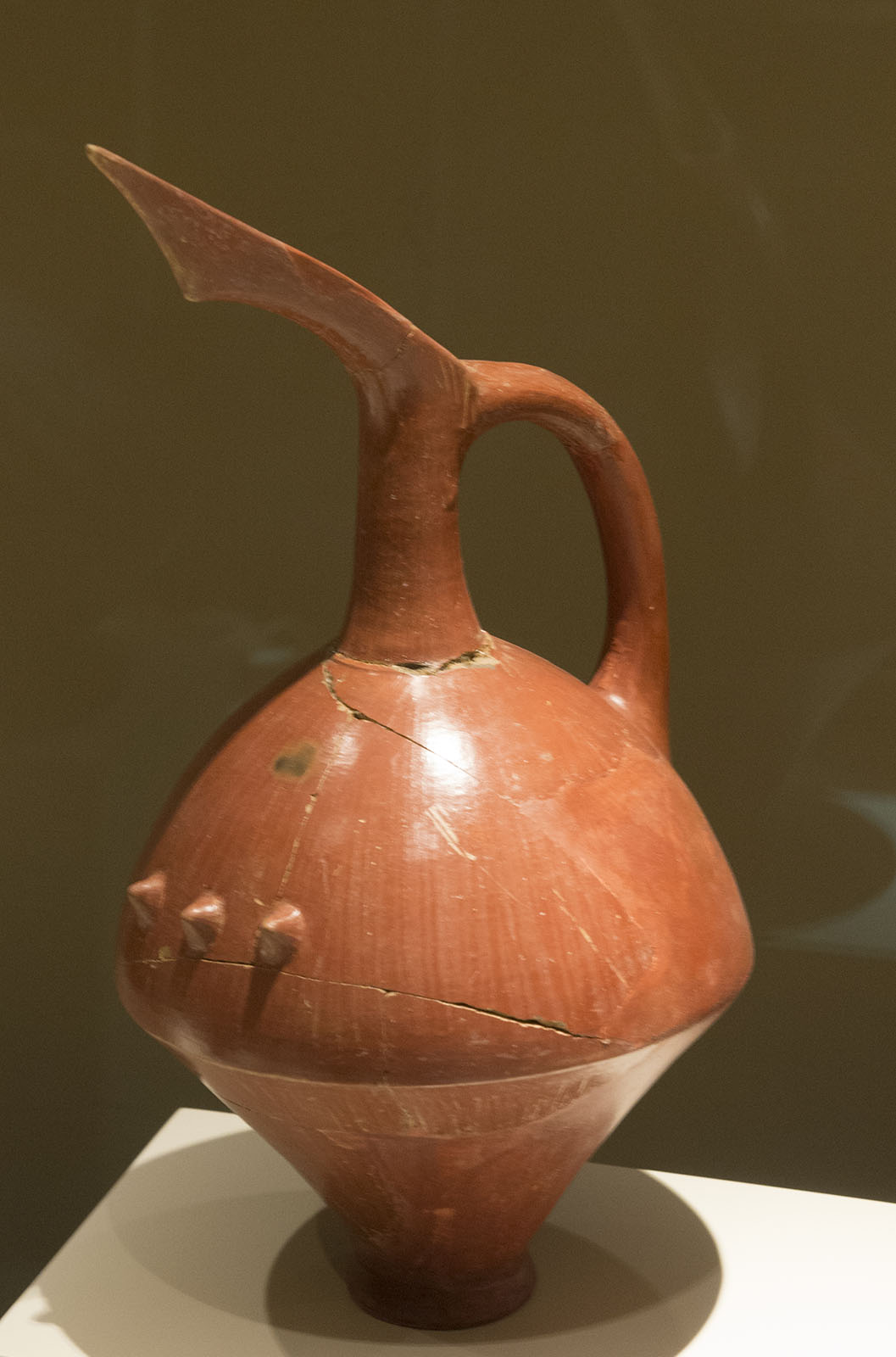
Museum of Anatolian Civilizations Pitcher Assyrian Colonies period

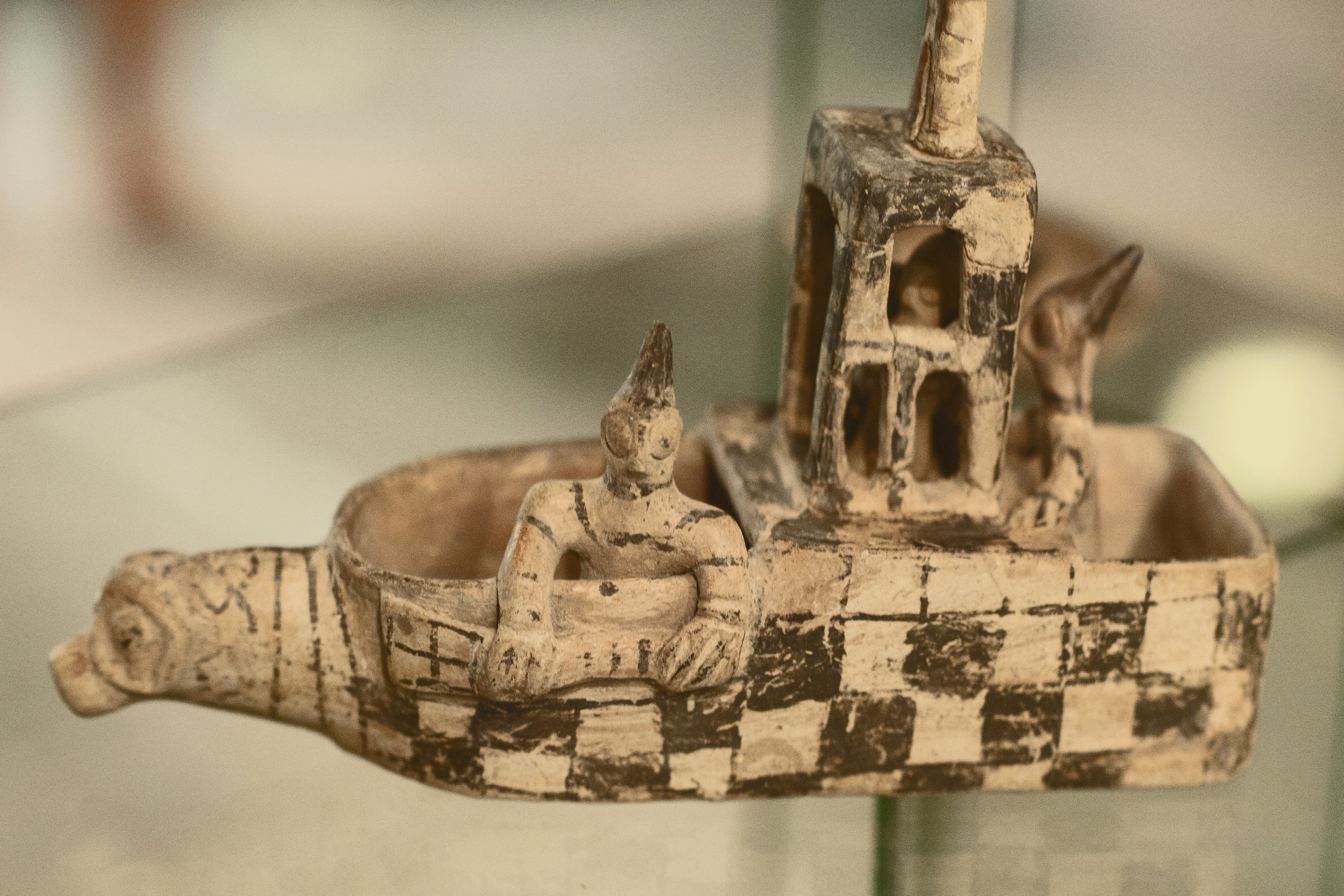
Museum of Anatolian Civilizations Vessel Assyrian Colonies period

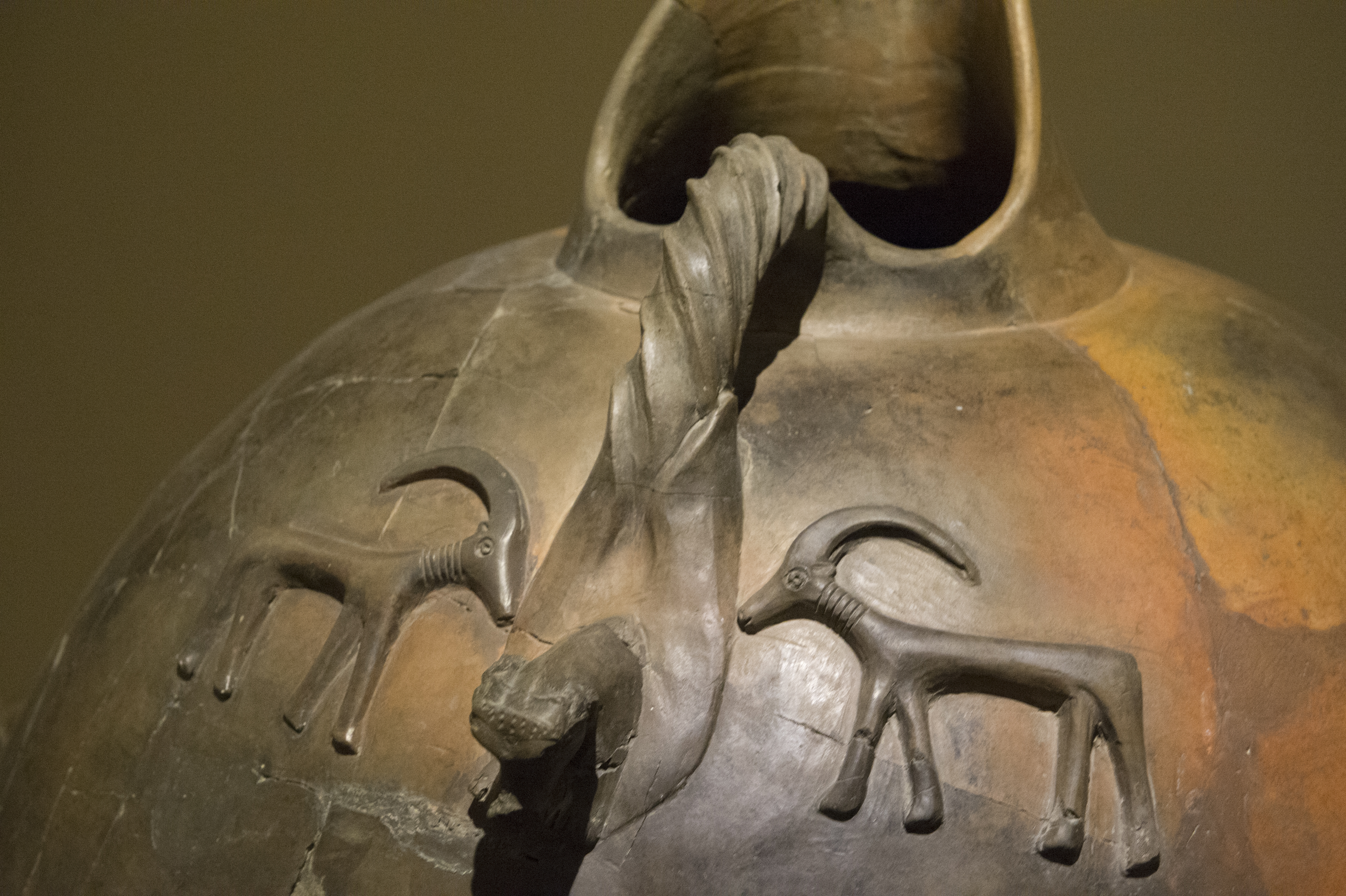
Museum of Anatolian Civilizations Pithos Hittite

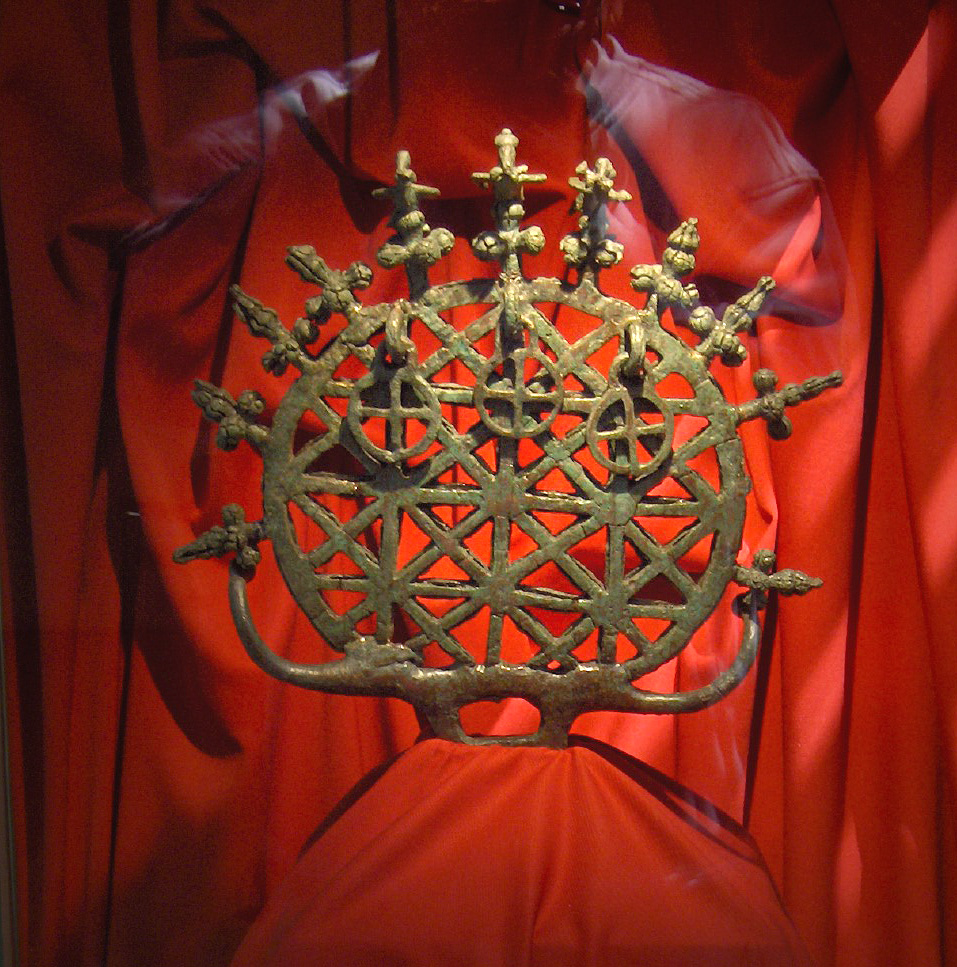
Bronze religious standard symbolizing the universe, used by Hittite priests

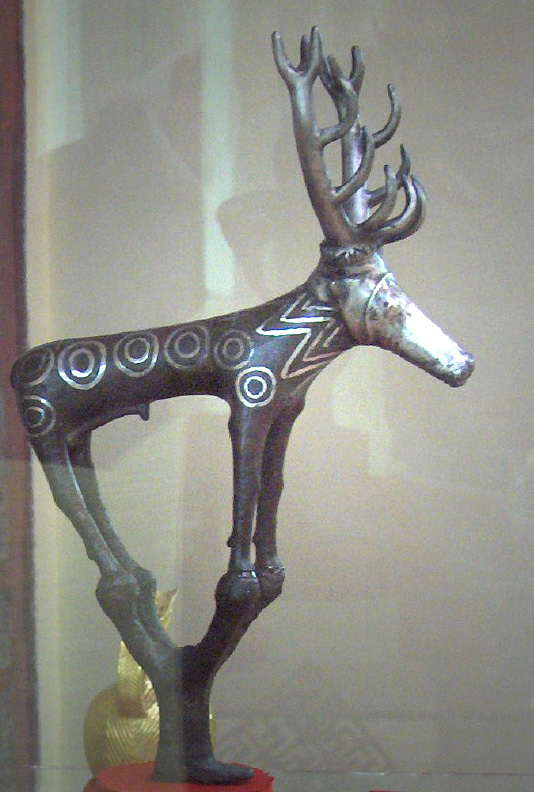
Stag statuette, symbol of a Hittite male god

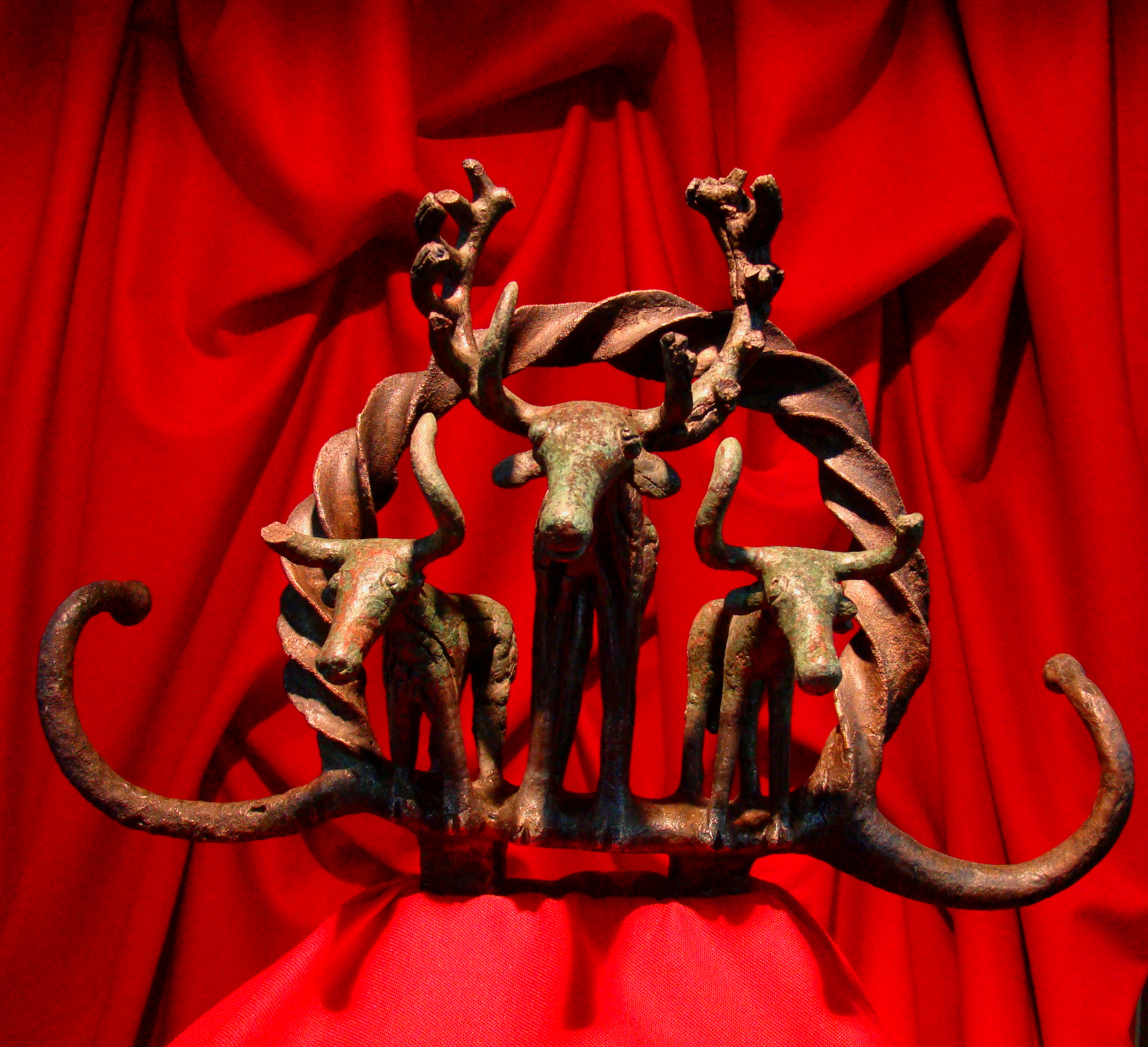
Bronze ceremonial standard of the Hittites

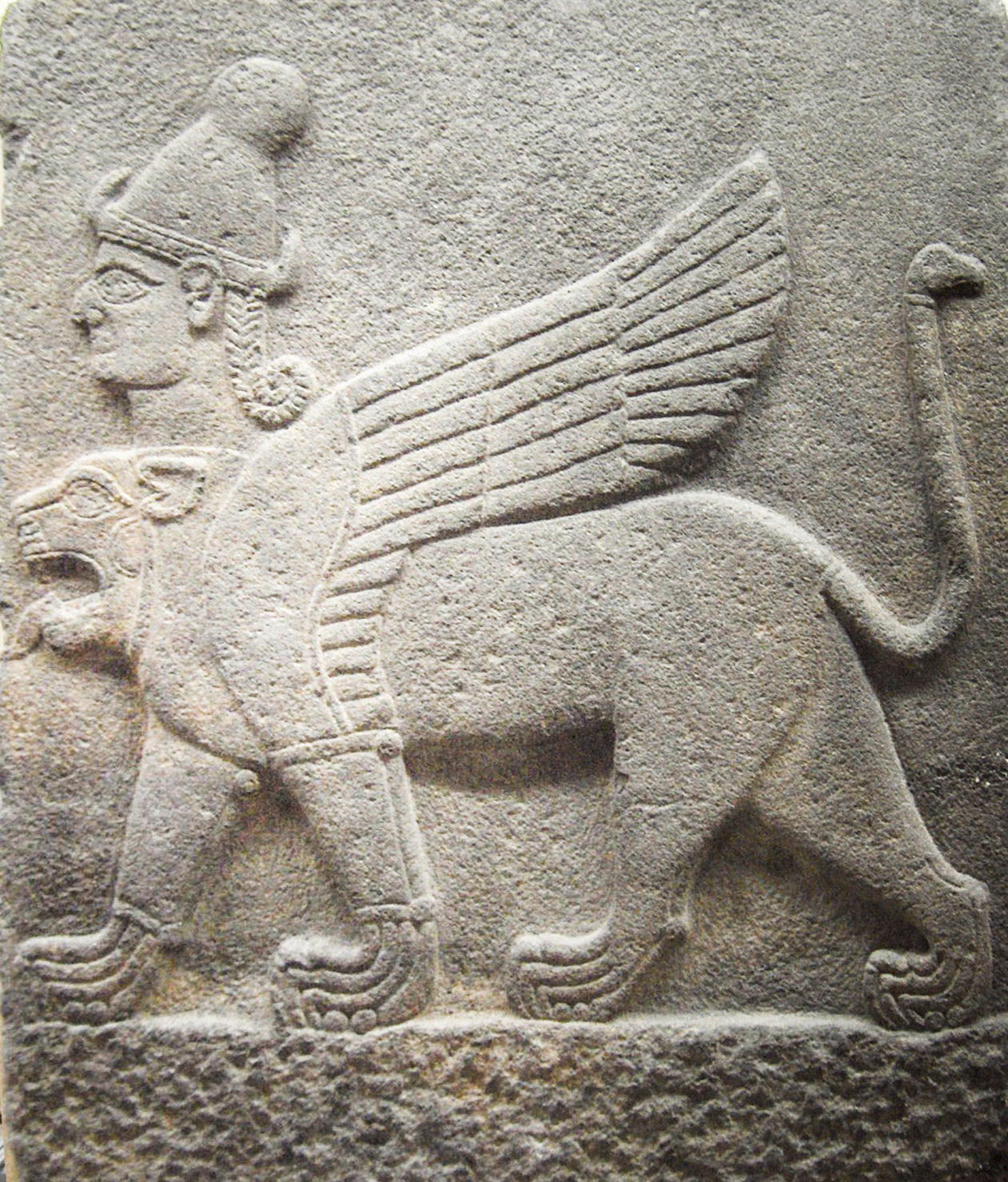
Chimera with a human head and a lion's head; Late Hittite period

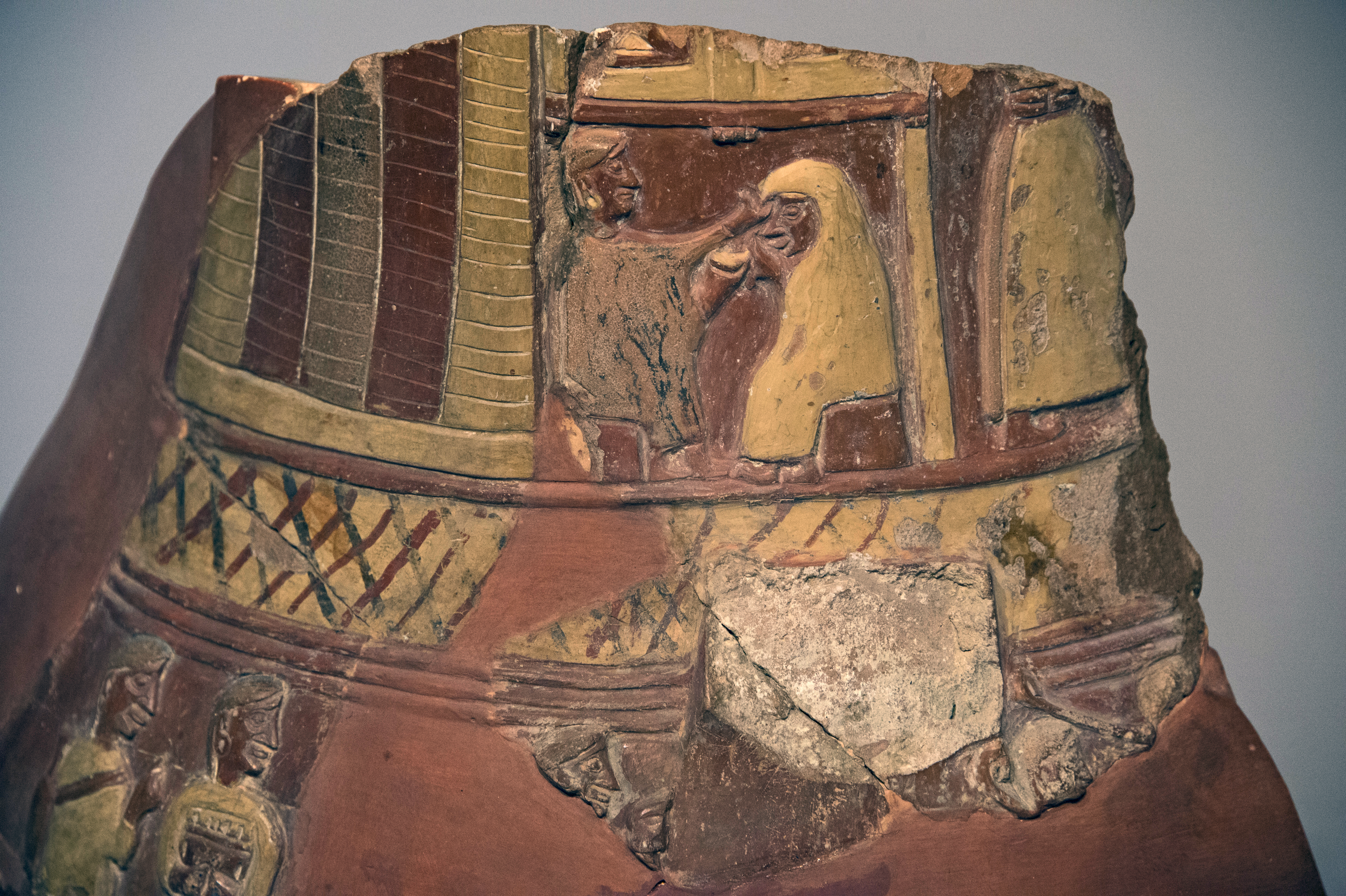
Museum of Anatolian Civilizations Bitik Vase Hittite

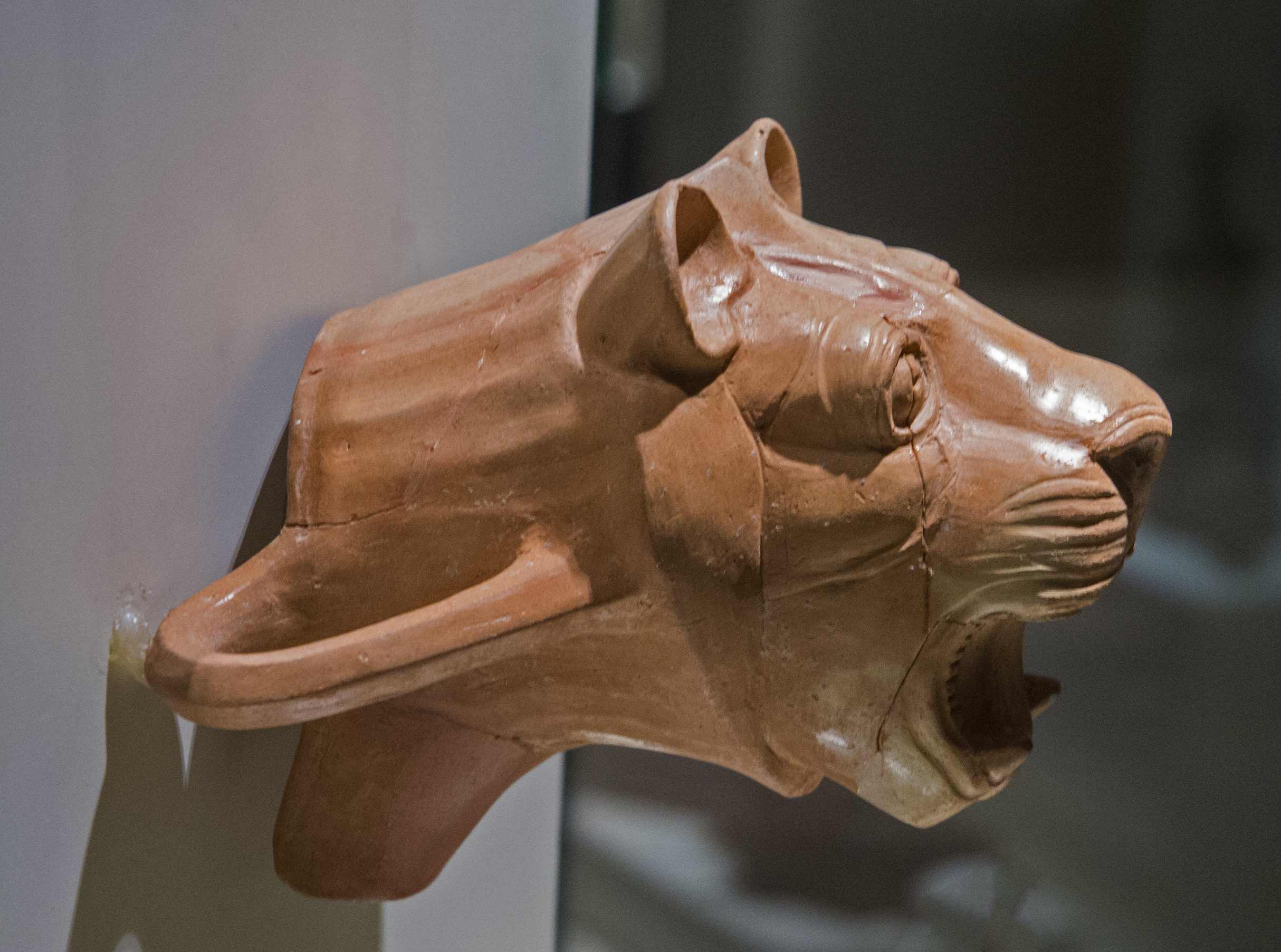
Museum of Anatolian Civilizations Vessel head

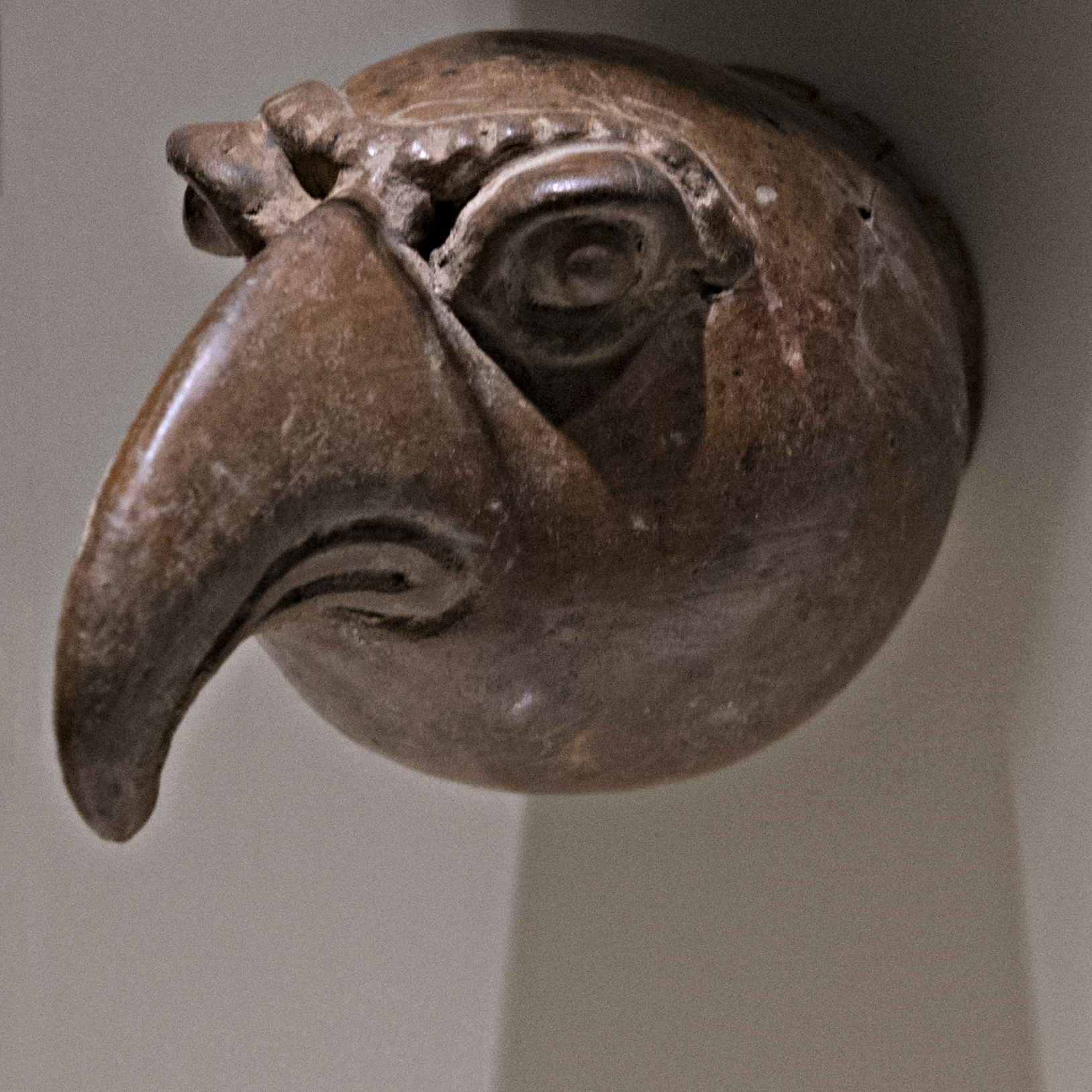
Museum of Anatolian Civilizations Vessel head

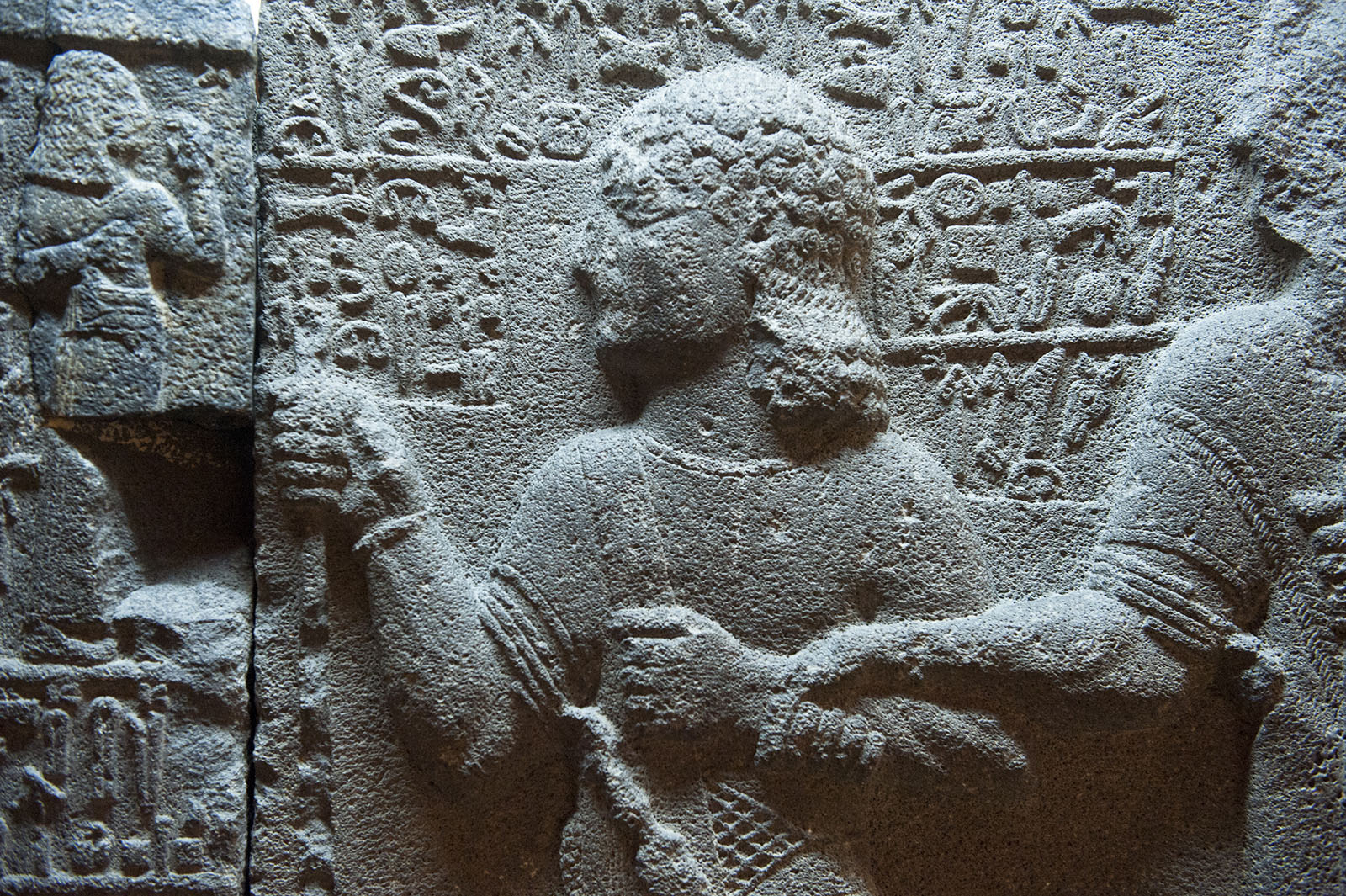
Museum of Anatolian Civilizations Relief Neo-Hittite

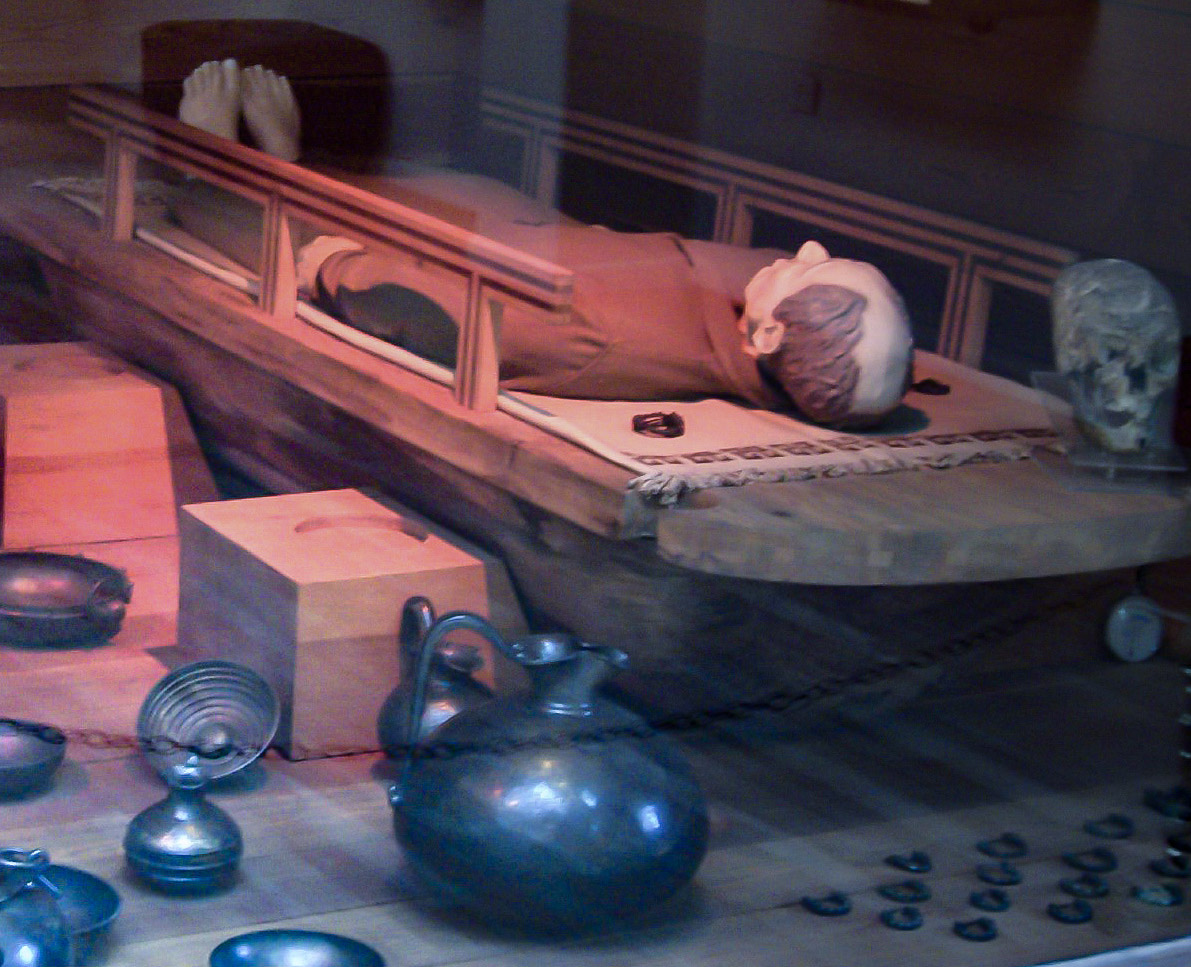
Reconstruction of the tomb of King Midas

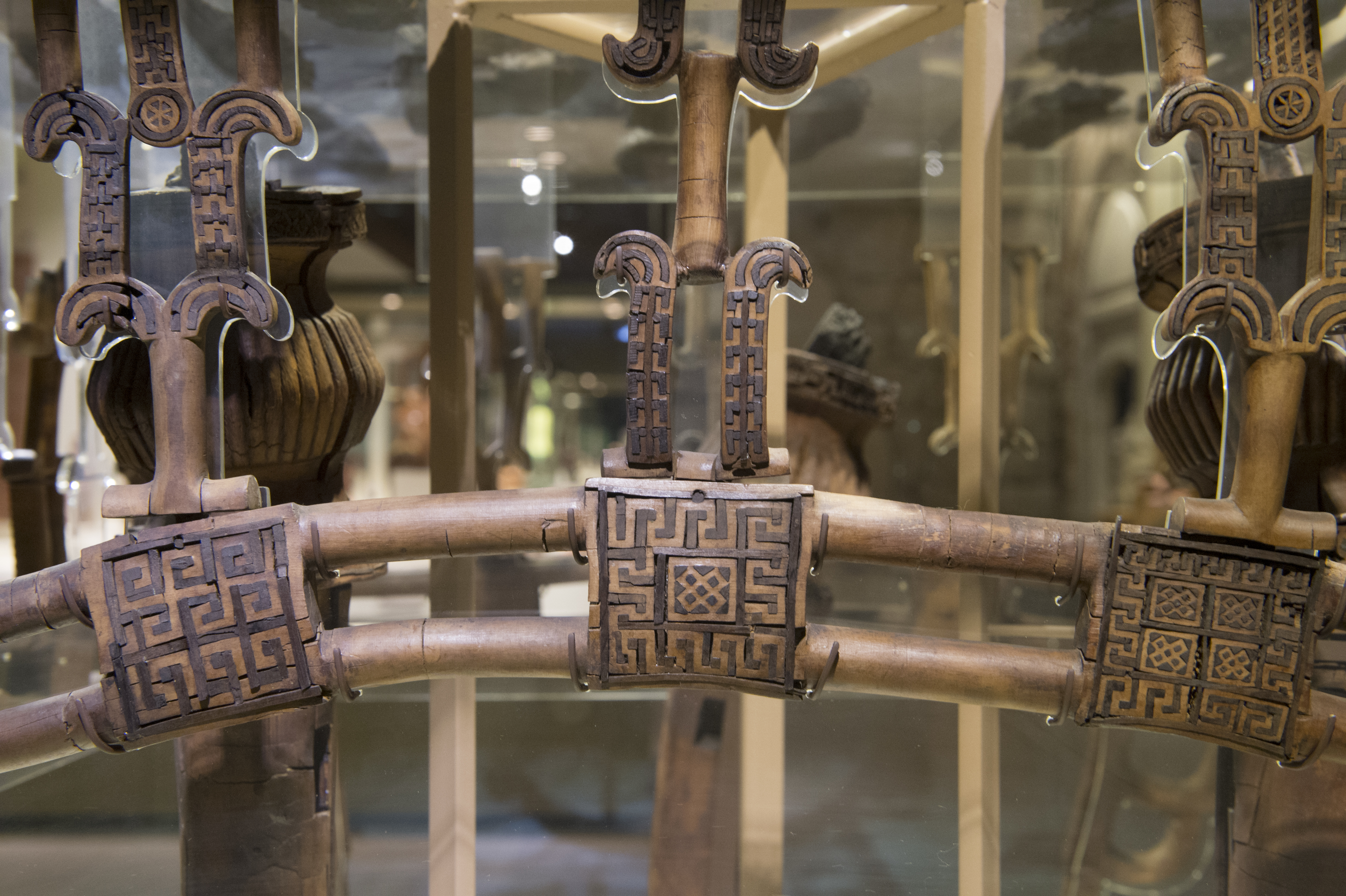
Museum of Anatolian Civilizations Phrygian Table

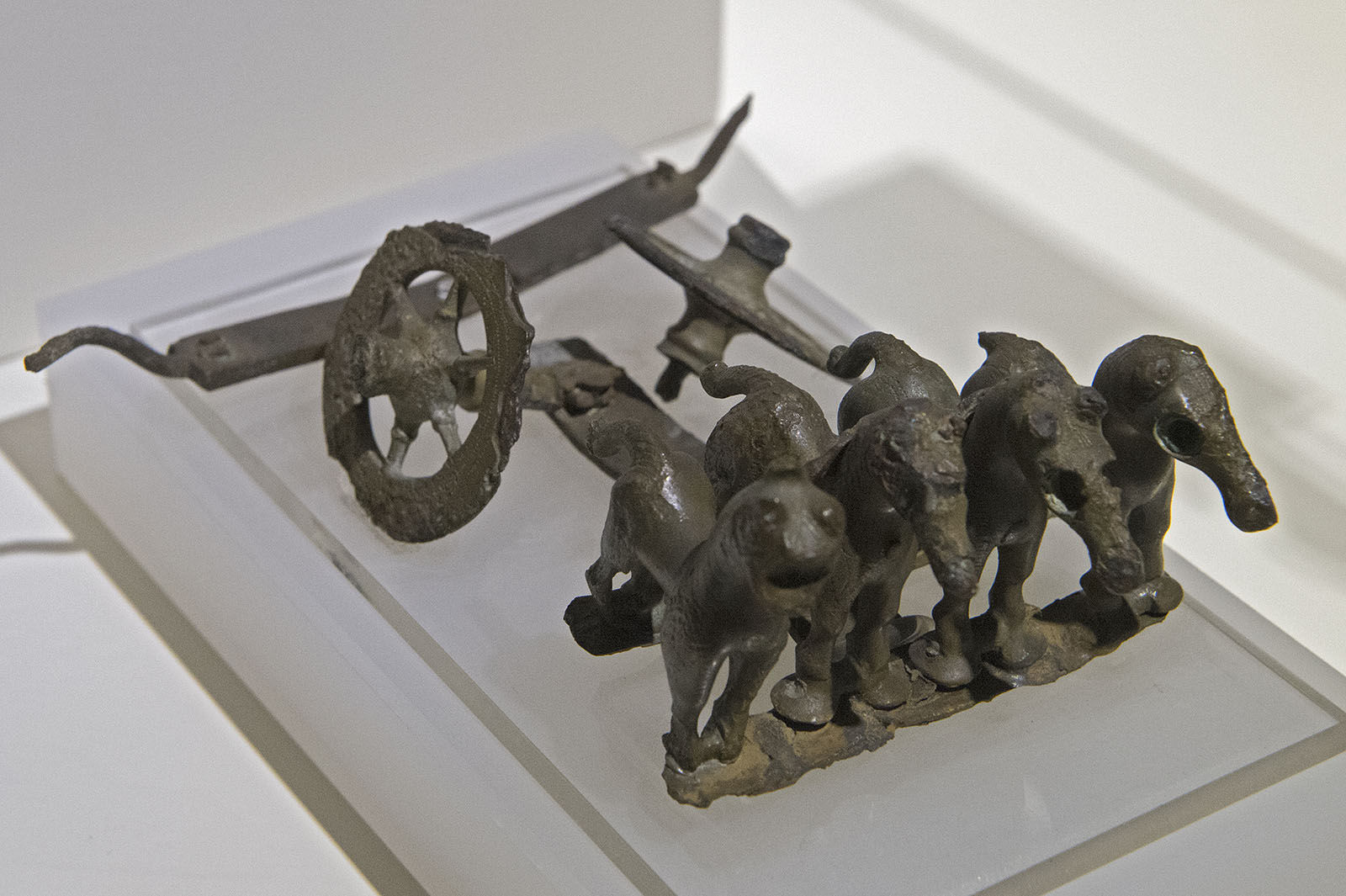
Museum of Anatolian Civilizations Chariot Phrygian

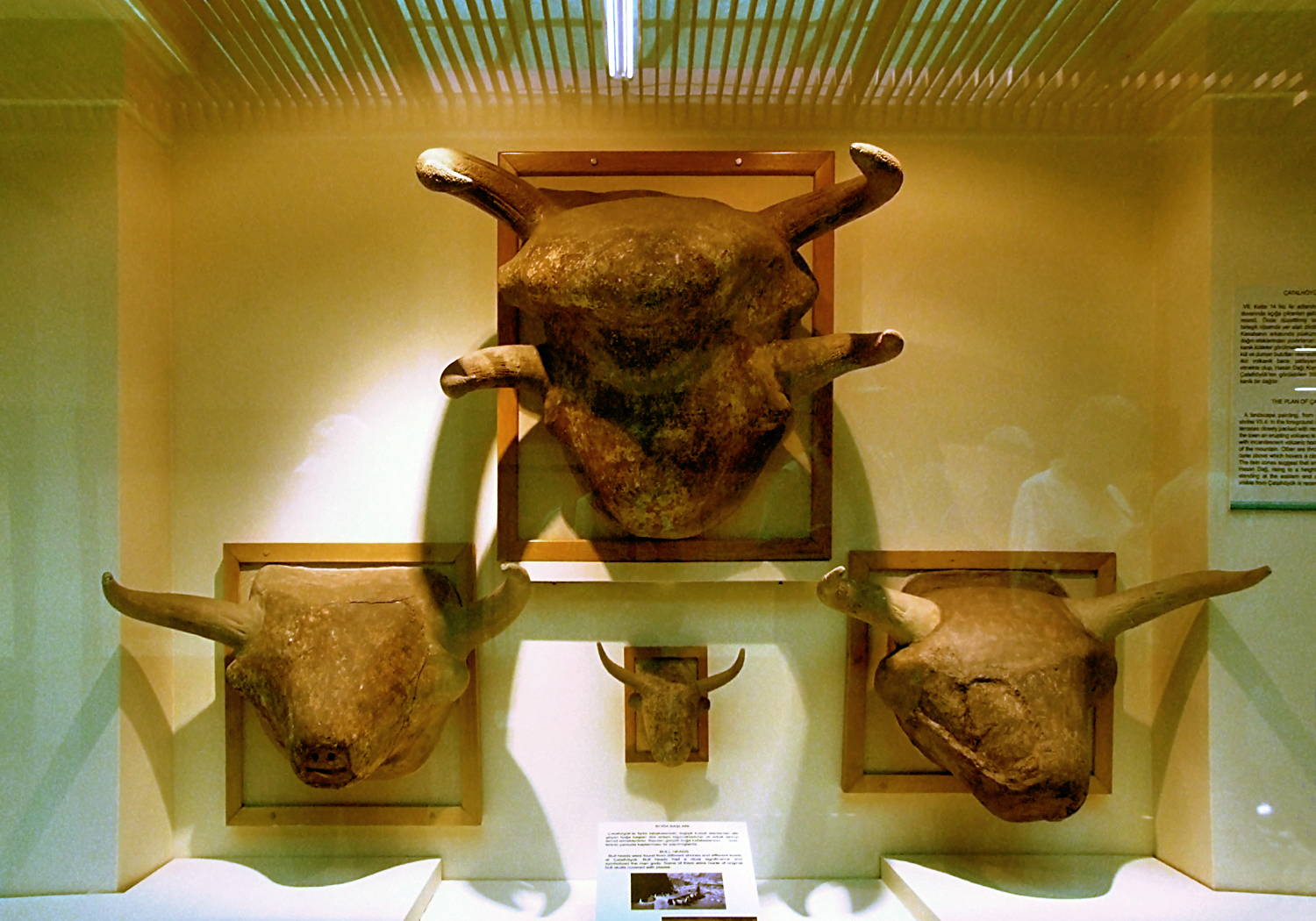
Bull heads from Çatalhöyük

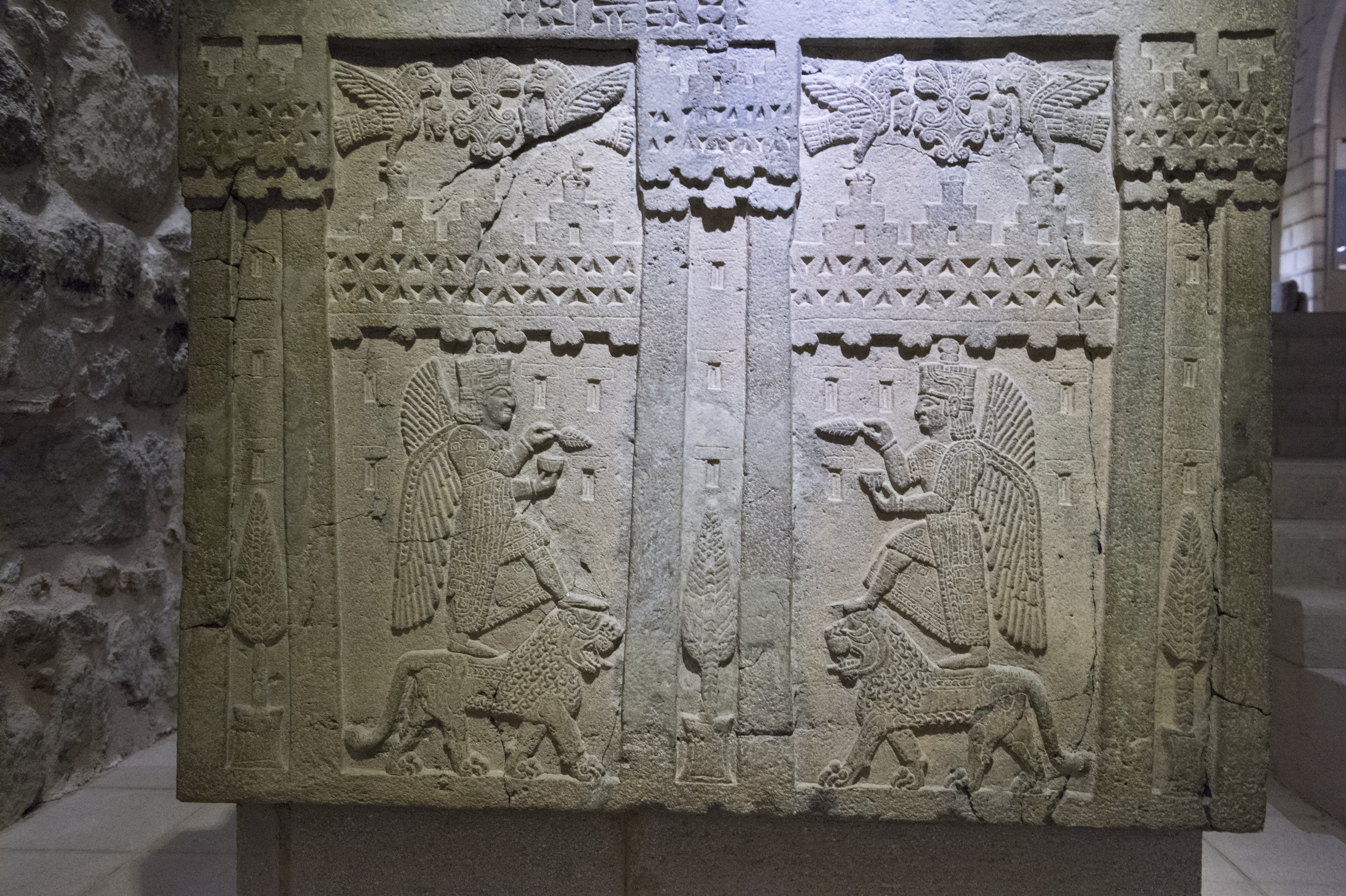
Museum of Anatolian Civilizations Relief Urartian

Museum of Anatolian Civilizations Ivory plaquettes Urartian

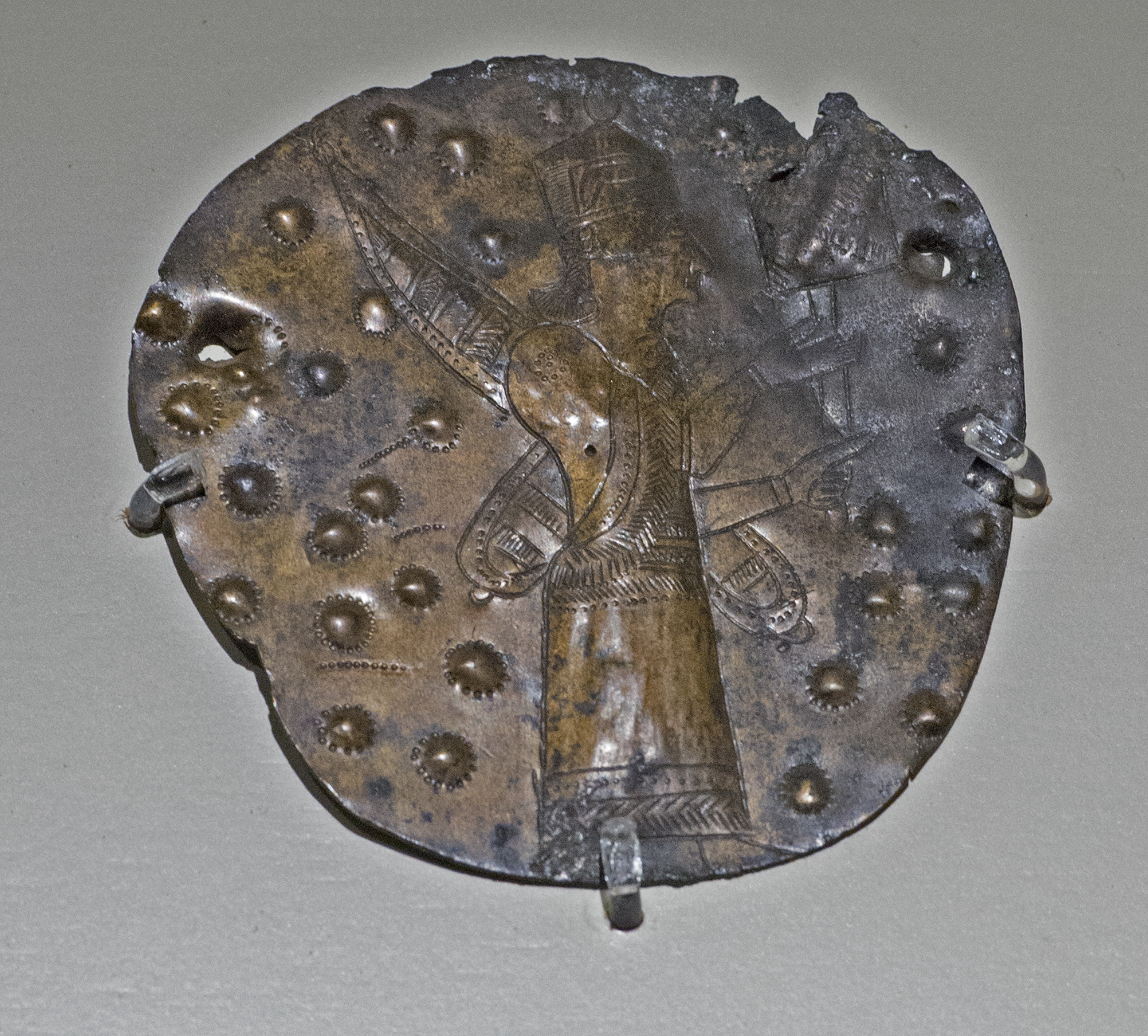
Museum of Anatolian Civilizations Urartian Votive plate Urartian

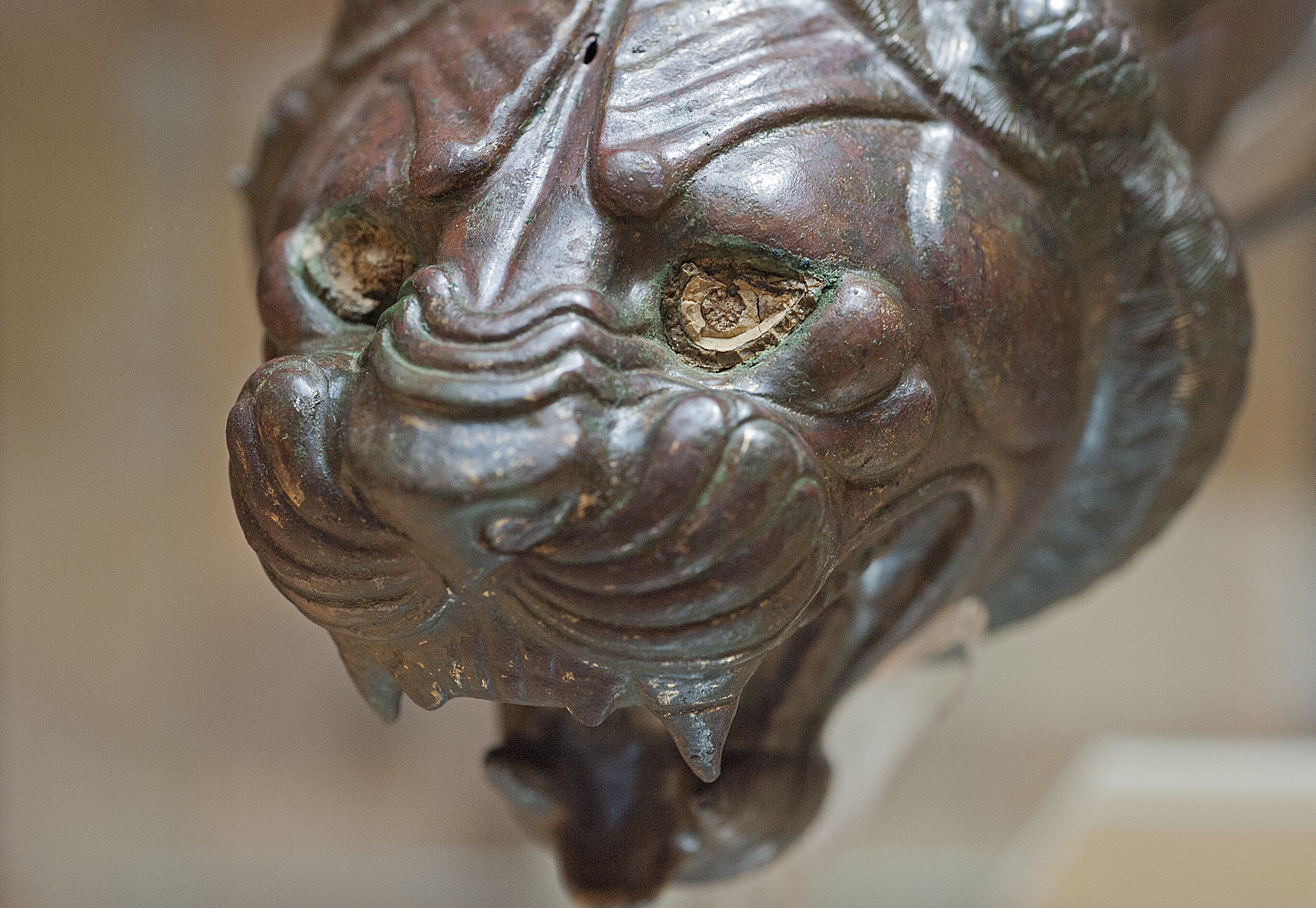
Museum of Anatolian Civilizations Situla Assyrian

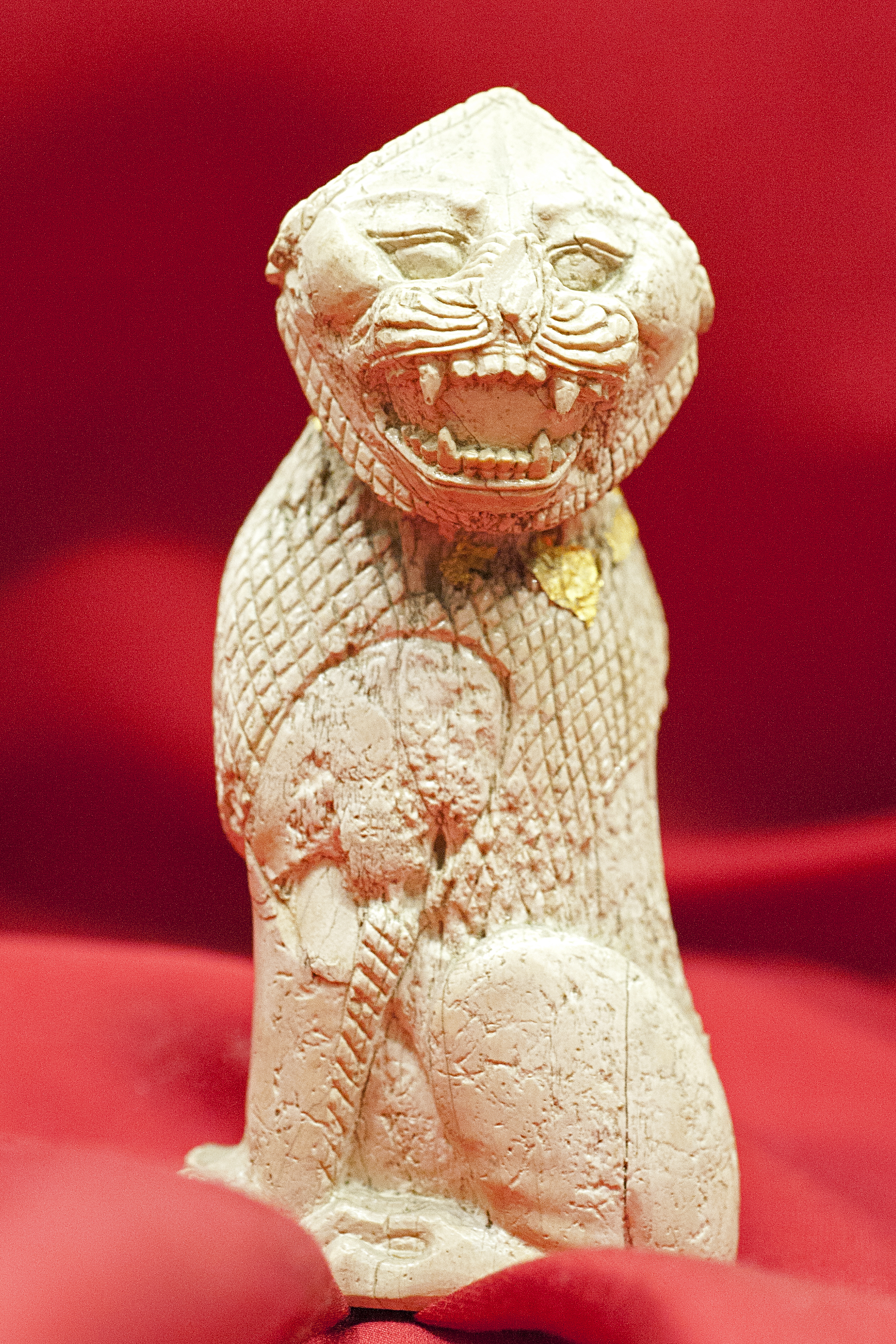
Museum of Anatolian Civilizations Lion Urartian

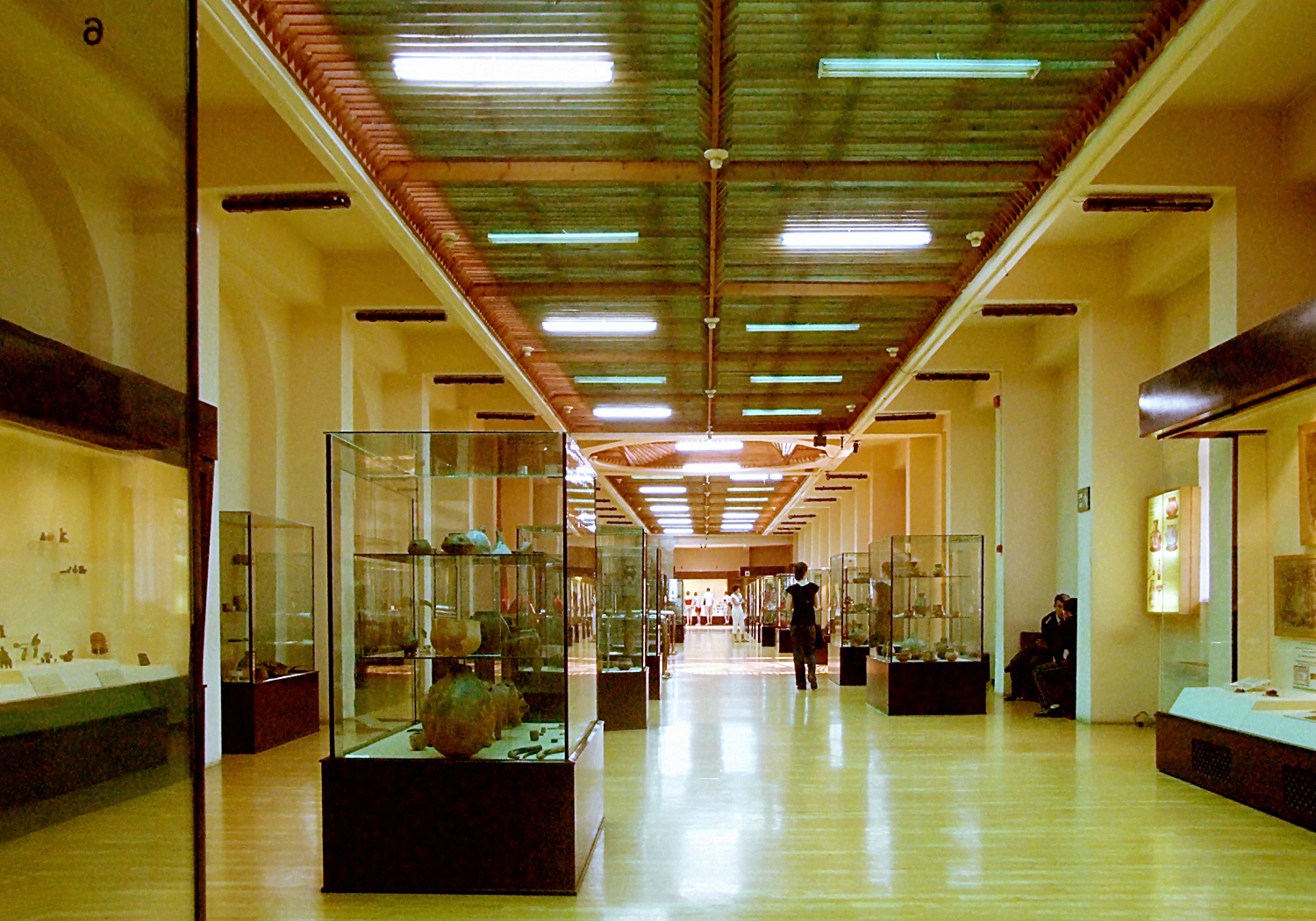
Perspective of a gallery

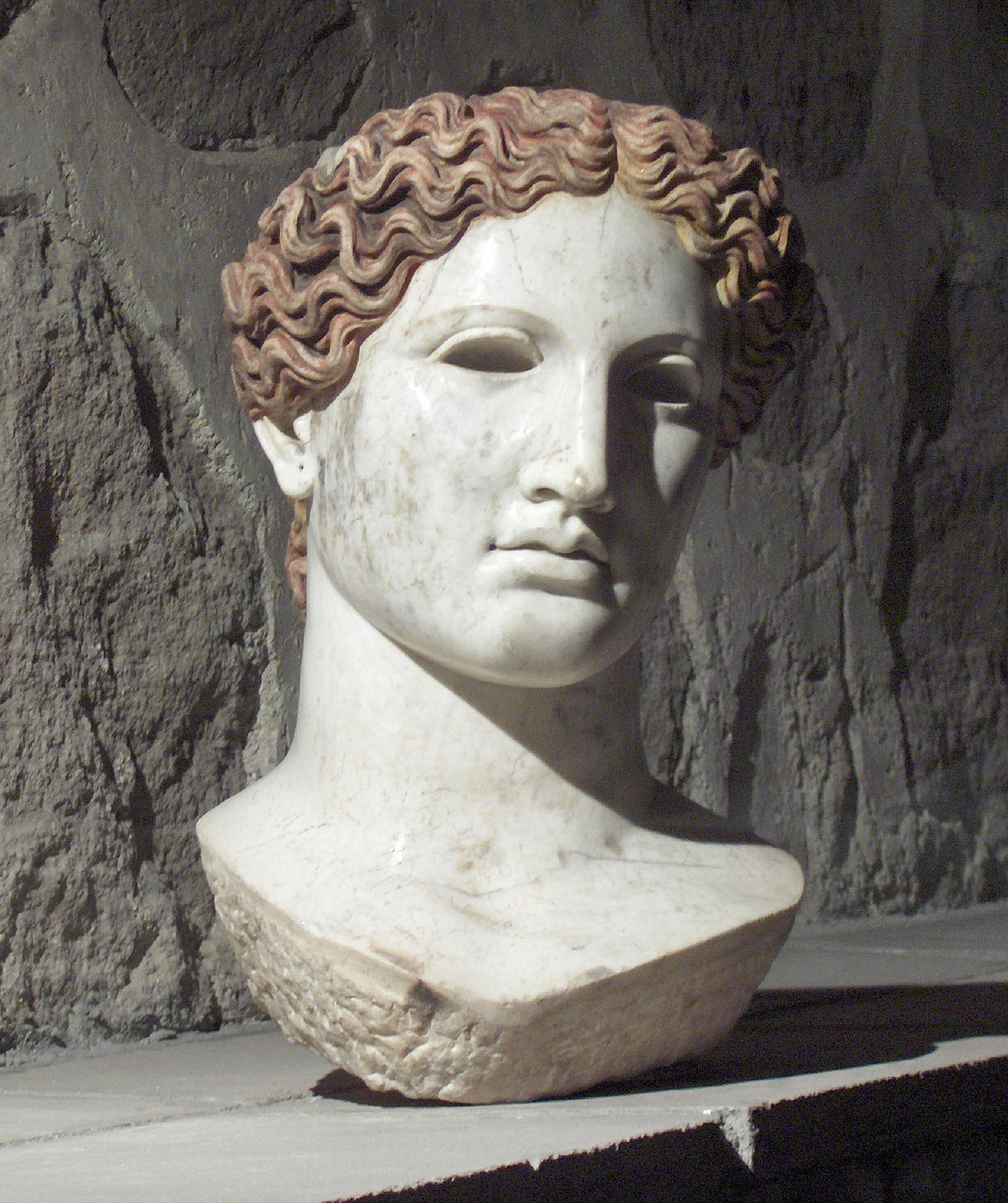
Marble head of a Roman woman

Piece of jewelry, an earring.

Piece of jewelry, a mirror

== See also ==
- List of Intangible Cultural Heritage elements in Turkey
- Anatolian Civilizations
- State Art and Sculpture Museum
- Ankara Ethnography Museum
