= Can Yücel =

Turkish poet (1926–1999)

- Born: August 21, 1926; Istanbul, Turkey
- Died: August 12, 1999 (aged 72); Datça, Turkey
- Occupation: Poet
- Spouse: Güler Yücel
- Children: 3
- Father: Hasan Âli Yücel

Can Yücel (pronounced [dʒan jyˈdʒæl]; August 21, 1926 – August 12, 1999) was a Turkish poet noted for his use of colloquial language.

== Biography ==
Can Yücel was the son of a former Minister of National Education, Hasan Âli Yücel, who left his mark on the history of education in Turkey, and a grandchild of an Ottoman sea captain who perished with the frigate Ertuğrul. He studied Latin and Ancient Greek at Ankara University and Cambridge. He later worked as a translator at several embassies and in the Turkish language section five years of the BBC in London. After his return to Turkey in 1958, he briefly worked as a tourist guide in Bodrum and Marmaris and then lived in Istanbul, where he worked as a freelance translator and started writing poetry.

Yucel was a poet with a keen political and social awareness. His poetry thrives on a strong combination of lyricism, jovial irony, and sarcasm. Because of his strongly critical poems, he was imprisoned several times. Yucel was certainly one of the most prominent and controversial translators in Turkey. His major poetry collections include Bir Siyasinin Şiirleri (Poems of a Political Prisoner / 1974), Sevgi Duvarı (Wall of Love / 1973), Ölüm ve Oğlum (Death and My Son / 1976), Gökyokuş (Steep Heaven / 1984), Canfeda (Life Offering / 1988), Çok Bi Çocuk (The Child Colors the Man / 1988), Mekânım Datça Olsun (Let Datça Be My Domicile / 1999) and Rengâhenk (Col'armony / 1991).

In his later years, he settled in the remote peninsular town of Datça in southwestern Turkey, where he died of throat cancer. His tomb is much visited. He had two daughters, Güzel and Su, and a son, Hasan, from his marriage to Güler Yücel.

== Literary style ==
Can Yücel was known for using slang and vulgar language in his poems. However, even his critics agreed that his skill in using words in a simple and understandable way is worthy of praise and appreciation. The main themes and inspirational sources in his poems are nature, people, events, concepts, excitements, perceptions, and emotions. His family was of utmost importance to him and his loved ones are mentioned in many of his poems, such as "To my Little Daughter Su," "To Güzel," and "I Loved My Father the Most in Life."

Yücel also translated the works of Shakespeare, Lorca and Brecht into Turkish and his creative rendering of these authors are classics in their own right in Turkey.

Extract

Oyunbozan bir akşamın altında,
Elinde bir yoyo gibi benliğin,
Senden damlara, damlardan geriye
Bir kadeh tutuştururlar eline derken.

== Works ==
=== Poetry ===
- Yazma (1950)
- Her Boydan (Çeviri Siirler) [Translations of Poems] (1957)
- Sevgi Duvari [Wall of Love] (1974)
- Bir Siyasinin Siirleri [Poems of a Politician] (1974)
- Ölüm ve Oglum [Death and My Son] (1976)
- Siir Alayi [Poetry Parade] (first four poetry books) (1981)
- Rengâhenk [Colorful Harmony] (1982)
- Gökyokus [Sky Ascend] (1984)
- Besibiyerde [Five-in-One] (first five poetry books) (1985)
- Canfeda [Self-Sacrifice] (1985)
- Çok Bi Çocuk [Quite a Kid] (1988)
- Kisa Devre [Short Circuit] (1990)
- Kuzgunun Yavrusu [The Raven's Offspring] (1990)
- Gece Vardiyasi [Night Shift] (1991)
- Güle Güle - Seslerin Sessizligi [Goodbye - The Silence of Voices] (1993)
- Gezintiler [Strolls] (1994)
- Maaile [Family Together] (1995)
- Seke Seke [Limping Along] (1997)
- Alavara (1999)
- Mekânim Datça Olsun [Let My Place Be Datça] (1999)

=== Translations ===
- Hatirladiklarim [This I Remember] by Eleanor Roosevelt - Seçilmis Hikâyeler Dergisi - Ankara (1953)
- Yeni Türkiye Bir Garp Devleti [New Turkey, a Western State] by Georges Duhamel (1956)
- Herboydan: Dünya Siirinden Seçmeler [Herboydan: Selections from World Poetry] - Seçilmis Hikâyeler Dergisi (1957)
- Anne Frank'in Hatira Defteri [The Diary of Anne Frank] by Anne Frank - Dost Yayinlari - Ankara (1958)
- Lord Stratford'un Türkiye Hatiralari [The Life of Lord Stratford de Redcliffe] by Stanley Lane Poole (1959)
- Muhtesem Gatsby [The Great Gatsby] by F. Scott Fitzgerald - Agaoglu Yayinevi (1964)
- Lenin Petrograd'da - Sosyalist Akimin Gelismesi [To the Finland Station] by Edmund Wilson - Agaoglu Yayinevi (1967)
- Gerilla Harbi [Guerrilla Warfare] by Mao Tse-Tung and Ernesto Che Guevara - Payel (1967)
- Küba'da Sosyalizm ve Insan [Socialism and Man in Cuba] by Ernesto Che Guevara - Payel (1967)
- Siyah Iktidar [Black Power] by Stokely Carmichael - Ant Yayinlari (1968)
- Salozun Mavali [The Shadow of the Coachman's Body] by Peter Weiss - Yöntem Yayinlari (1972)
- Yeni Baslayanlar Için Marks [Marx for Beginners] by Rius - Vardiya Yayinlari (1977)
- Kafkas Tebesir Dairesi [The Caucasian Chalk Circle] by Bertolt Brecht - Izlem Yayinlari - Istanbul (1980)
- Bahar Noktasi [Spring Awakening] (A translation of A Midsummer Night's Dream) by Shakespeare - Agaoglu Yayinevi (1981)
- Svayk Hitler’e Karsi [Schweik in the Second World War] by Bertolt Brecht - Izlem Yayinlari (1982)
- Snoopy - Bir Fistik Kitabi [Snoopy - A Peanuts Book] by Charles M. Schulz - Kaktüs (1983)
- Hamlet by Shakespeare - Papirüs Yayinlari (1996)
- Bati Yakasinin Hikâyesi [West Side Story] by Arthur Laurents - Gözlem Yayincilik (1988)
- Kizil Komser [The Good Soldier Švejk] by Jaroslav Hašek - Cem Yayinevi (1991)
- Snoopy Kar Korkusu 2 [Snoopy's Fear of Snow 2] by Charles M. Schulz - Papirus Yayinlari (1991)
- Firtina [The Tempest] by William Shakespeare - Adam Yayinlari (1991)
- Maksat Samimiyet [Intentions] by Oscar Wilde - Is Bankasi Yayinlari, ISBN 978-605-295509-3 (2018)
