= Ali Rıza Artunkal =

Turkish politician

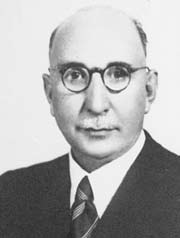

Minister of National Defense
- In office 12 November 1941 – 7 August 1946
- Prime Minister: Refik Saydam; Ahmet Fikri Tüzer; Şükrü Saracoğlu
- Preceded by: Saffet Arıkan
- Succeeded by: Cemil Cahit Toydemir

Personal details
- Born: 1885 Plovdiv, Ottoman Empire
- Died: 1959 (aged 73–74) Istanbul, Turkey

Ali Rıza Artunkal (1885–1959) was a Turkish politician and former government minister. He was the Minister of National Defence between 1941 and 1946. He was also a member of the early Young Turks Turanist movement.

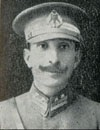
Ali Rıza Artunkal, 1920s
