= Hasan Âli Yücel =

Turkish education reformer and philosophy teacher

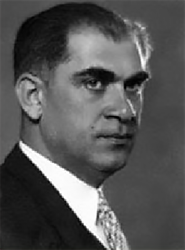

Minister of National Education
- In office 28 December 1938 – 5 August 1946
- Prime Minister: Celâl Bayar; Refik Saydam; Şükrü Saracoğlu
- Preceded by: Saffet Arıkan
- Succeeded by: Reşat Şemsettin Sirer

Member of the Grand National Assembly
- In office 1 March 1935 – 24 March 1950

Personal details
- Born: 17 December 1897 Istanbul, Ottoman Empire
- Died: 26 February 1961 (aged 63) Istanbul, Turkey
- Resting place: Cebeci Asri Cemetery, Ankara
- Party: Republican People's Party
- Children: Can Yücel
- Education: Istanbul University

Hasan Âli Yücel (17 December 1897 – 26 February 1961) was a Turkish education reformer and philosophy teacher who served as minister of national education of Turkey from December 1938 to August 1946. He is remembered for the foundation of Village Institutes.

== Early life and education ==
He was born in Istanbul in 1897. He graduated from Vefa High School. After graduating from Istanbul University Faculty of Literature, he started teaching on 19 December 1922. With the establishment of the Turkish Language Association on 12 July 1932, Hasan Âli Yücel was appointed as the head of the etymology branch.

== Minister of National Education (1938-1946) ==
Turkey's entry into UNESCO and foundation of State Conservatory (20 May 1940) has been a result of his efforts. The University Reform (establishment of Ankara University Faculty of Science, transformation of Higher Engineering School into Istanbul Technical University and establishment of Ankara University Faculty of Medicine), translation of world classics into Turkish and preliminary studies of İnönü Encyclopedia, the first official and copyrighted Turkish encyclopedia, were carried out during his ministry. As a result of four years of his efforts, the Law of Universities were enacted on 25 June 1946. With this law, the tight ties of higher education institutions with the Ministry were significantly loosened, existing institutions were brought to a structural integrity, thus giving universities an organic character. Ankara University was established as a result of this law.

== Legacy ==
He was a known Islamokemalist thinker. The Faculty of Education of Istanbul University-Cerrahpaşa is named after him. In 1997, UNESCO was associated with the celebration of the centenary of his birth.
