= Saffet Arıkan =

Turkish politician

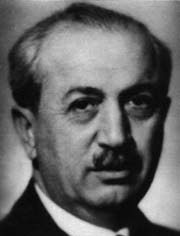

Minister of National Education
- In office 16 June 1935 – 28 December 1938
- Prime Minister: İsmet İnönü; Celâl Bayar
- Preceded by: Zeynel Abiddin Özmen
- Succeeded by: Hasan Âli Yücel

Minister of National Defense
- In office 5 April 1940 – 12 November 1941
- Prime Minister: Refik Saydam
- Preceded by: Naci Tınaz
- Succeeded by: Ali Rıza Artunkal

Personal details
- Born: 26 November 1887 Erzincan
- Died: 26 November 1947 (aged 60) Istanbul, Turkey
- Party: Republican People's Party (CHP)
- Education: Military academy
- Occupation: Politician

Saffet Arıkan (1887–1947) was a Turkish politician and former government minister.

== Biography ==
He was born in Erzincan, Ottoman Empire. In 1910 he graduated from the Military Academy. After a brief service in Yemen, he was appointed to an office work in Istanbul. In 1915 he fought in the Battle of Gully Ravine (Kerevizdere) during the Dardanelles Campaign. Later he also served in Mesopotamia. After the Ottoman Empire was defeated in World War I, he joined the nationalists in the Turkish War of Independence. He served briefly as the newly founded Turkey's military attache in Moscow.

From 8 August 1923, he was elected as an MP in the 2nd Parliament of Turkey. He was reelected in the following terms. In the 8th, 9th and 10th government of Turkey he was the Minister of Education and in the 12th government of Turkey he was the Minister National Defence. He was the Turkish ambassador to Germany from 1942 to 1944.

He is known as one of the pioneers of the Village Institutes. Although the project began after his term in the Ministry of Education, another project called "village trainer" (Turkish: köy eğitmeni) which was the predecessor of the village institutes began in 1936 during his term in the office.

He is also known as having proposed the surname Atatürk for Turkish national leader Mustafa Kemal.

Arıkan committed suicide on 26 November 1947 in Istanbul.

Political offices
| Preceded by Zeynel Abiddin Özmen | Minister of National Education; 16 June 1935 – 28 December 1938 | Succeeded by Hasan Ali Yücel |
| Preceded by Naci Tınaz | Minister of National Defence; 5 April 1940 – 12 November 1941 | Succeeded by Ali Rıza Artunkal |
