= İnönü =

İnönü may refer to:

== Surname ==
- İsmet İnönü (1884–1973), President of Turkey from 1938 to 1950
- Mevhibe İnönü (1897–1992), First Lady of Turkey from 1938 to 1950
- Erdal İnönü (1926–2007), physicist and politician

== Places ==
- BJK İnönü Stadium, the home of the football club Beşiktaş J.K. in Istanbul, Turkey
- İnönü, Eskişehir, a town and district in Eskişehir Province, Turkey
- İnönü, Turkish name of Sinta, Cyprus, a village in Northern Cyprus
- İnönü University a university in Malatya, Turkey
- İsmet İnönü Stadium, formerly Çilekli Football Field, a football stadium in Beşiktaş, Istanbul, Turkey home to amateur football matches
- Malatya İnönü Stadium, a multi-use stadium in Malatya, Turkey

== Ships ==
- TCG 1. Inönü (S 330), a submarine in the Turkish Navy
- TCG 2. Inönü (S 331), a submarine in the Turkish Navy
- TCG 2. Inönü (S 333), a submarine in the Turkish Navy

== See also ==
- Battle of İnönü (disambiguation), either of two battles of the Greco-Turkish War (1919–1922)
