= Mevhibe İnönü =

First Lady of Turkey from 1938 to 1950

- İnönü in the early 1940s

First Lady of Turkey
- In role 11 November 1938 – 27 May 1950
- President: İsmet İnönü
- Preceded by: Latife Uşşaki
- Succeeded by: Reşide Bayar

Personal details
- Born: 22 September 1897 Fatih, Istanbul, Ottoman Empire
- Died: 29 February 1992 (aged 94) Keçiören, Ankara, Turkey
- Resting place: Cebeci Asri Cemetery
- Spouse: İsmet İnönü (m. 1916; died 1973)
- Children: 4, including Erdal and Özden

Emine Mevhibe İnönü (22 September 1897 – 29 February 1992) was the First Lady of Turkey from 11 November 1938, until 27 May 1950, during the presidency of her husband İsmet İnönü.

== Early years ==
She was born on September 22, 1897, at Süleymaniye neighborhood of Fatih district in Istanbul. Her father died of tuberculosis as she was three years old. Shortly later, her sibling also died. Following the losses in the family, Mevhibe's mother moved with her to the grandfather's house, where she was raised then on. She left the secondary school after the first grade due to the family's decision.

She married on April 13, 1917, to Mustafa İsmet, an officer of the Ottoman Army in the rank of colonel (Ottoman Turkish: Miralay). 21 days later, her husband left for the front at the Middle Eastern theatre of World War I to return home only after the conclusion of Armistice of Mudros on October 30, 1918.

The couple's first son was born in 1919. Mustafa İsmet went in 1920 to Anatolia to join the Turkish War of Independence. As being the spouse of an officer, who was sentenced to death by the Ottoman administration for his involvement in the national resistance, Mevhibe moved together with her family members to her husband's hometown Malatya, and remained there in the years of the struggle. Her son İzzet died in 1921 during that time.

The family settled in İzmir shortly after its re-capture by the Turkish troops on September 9, 1922. During the negotiations of the Treaty of Lausanne that lasted eleven weeks from November 1922, she accompanied her husband in Switzerland, who was the head of the Turkish delegation. In 1924, she mothered her second son Ömer. That year, she moved into Pembe Köşk in Ankara, which her husband purchased newly. The mansion became their home until 1975. In 1926, their third son Erdal, and then in 1930 the couple's daughter Özden was born. Mevhibe İnönü visited several places including Athens, Moscow and Rome as the prime minister's spouse.

In 1934, the Surname Law came into effect. Mustafa İsmet and his family members received the family name İnönü in honor of the First and Second Battle of İnönü, he was a victorious commander of.

== First lady ==
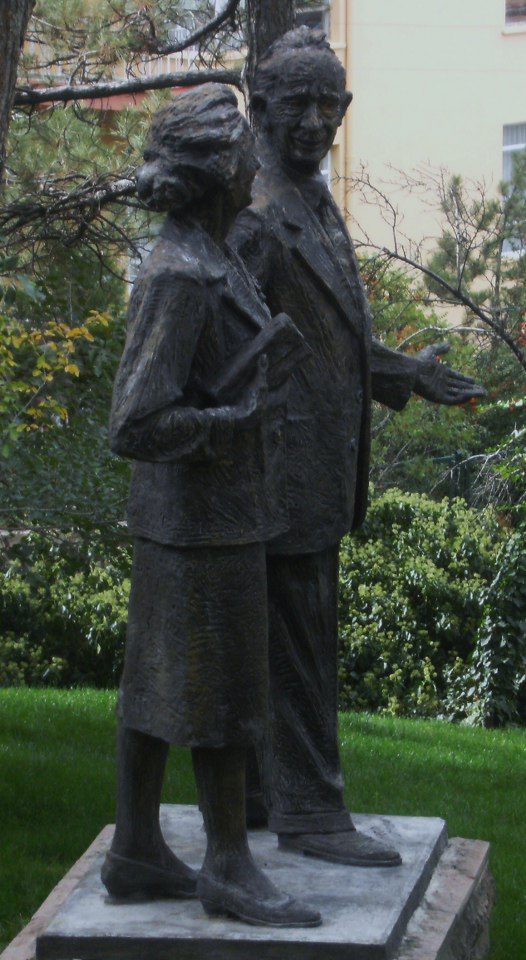
Mevhibe and İsmet İnönü's statues by Metin Yurdanur in the garden of Pembe Köşk, Ankara.

Following the death of Mustafa Kemal Atatürk on November 10, 1938, the founder and the first president of the Turkish Republic, İsmet İnönü was elected president the next day. Mevhibe İnönü moved then as the second first lady into Çankaya Köşkü, the official presidential residence, where she stayed until May 27, 1950.

== Personal interests ==
She was known as a polite and elegant woman. She co-founded in 1928 "Yardımsevenler Derneği" (Association of Humanists) and in 1949 "Türk Kadınlar Birliği" (Union of Turkish Women). In 1983, she and her children set up a foundation in honor of their late family father İsmet İnönü. She became the first chairperson of the board of trustees of the İnönü Foundation.

== Later years ==
Mevhibe İnönü lost her husband on December 25, 1973, who played a long and important role in the Turkish politics. On July 20, 1991, she was hospitalized in the military hospital GATA in Ankara, where she died on February 29, 1992. She was laid to rest at the Cebeci Asri Cemetery in Ankara.

== Family ==
Mevhibe married Ismet Inönü on 13 April 1916 and widowed on 25 December 1973.

They had three sons and a daughter:

- İzzet Inönü (1919 – 1921)
- Ömer İnönü (1924 – 2 March 2004). He married Engin Ögelman on 4 September 1952 and had two sons, Hayri and Eren İnönü.
- Erdal İnönü (6 June 1926 – 31 October 2007). Politician and physician. He married Sevinç Sohtorik in 1957.
- Özden İnönü (b. 7 February 1930). She married Metin Toker on 9 February 1955 and had two daughters and a son: Nurperi, Ayşe Gülsün and Güçlü Toker.

== Gallery ==
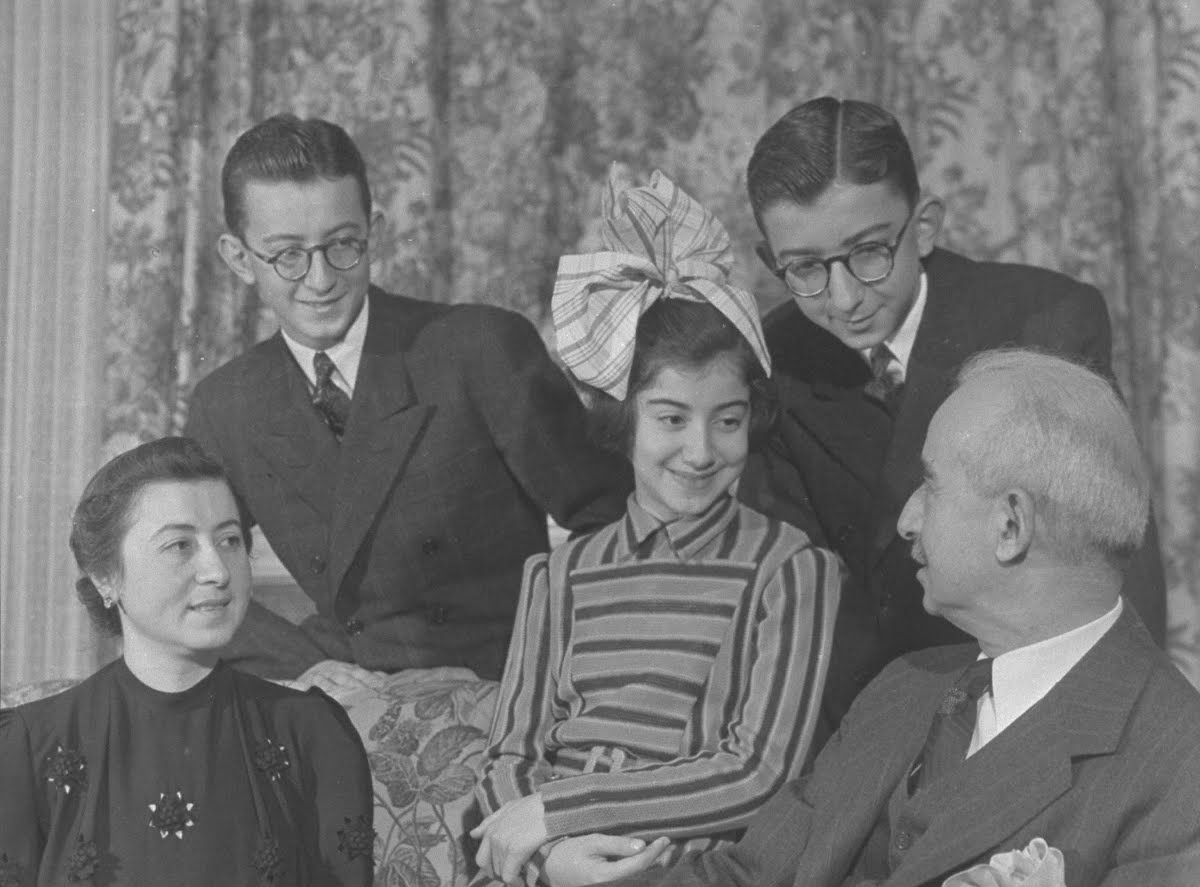
Mevhibe with her husband and their three survived children, from left Ömer, Özden and Erdal.

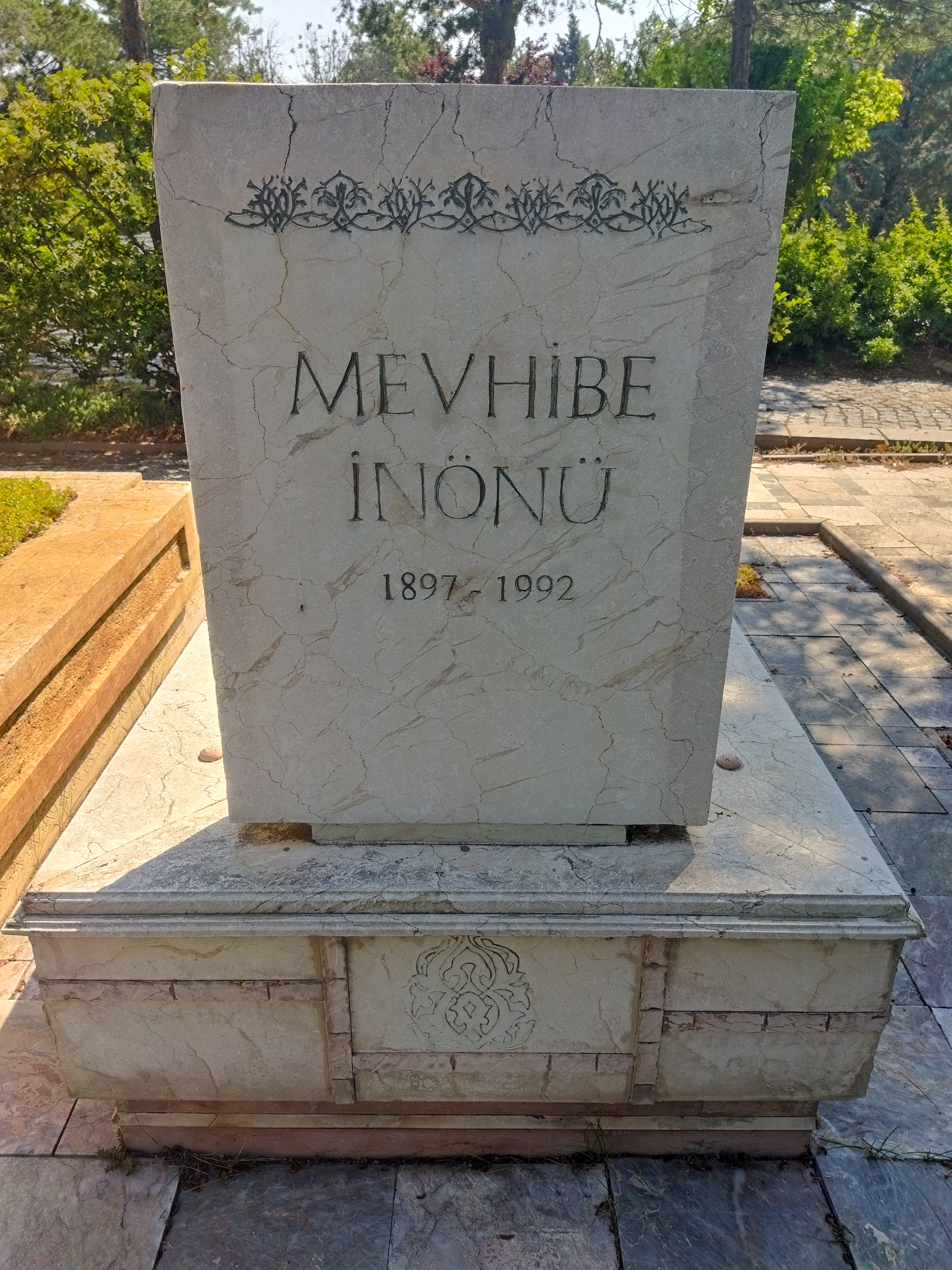
Grave of Mevhibe İnönü in Cebeci Asri Cemetery, Ankara
