= Akis (periodical) =

Weekly political magazine in Turkey between 1954 and 1967

- Editor: Metin Toker; Kurtul Altuğ
- Categories: Political magazine
- Frequency: Weekly
- First issue: 15 May 1954
- Final issue: 31 December 1967
- Country: Turkey
- Based in: Ankara
- Language: Turkish

Akis (“echo”) was a former political periodical in Turkey. It was a 36-page weekly magazine somewhat resembling Time magazine. Its motto was "serious but not boring". There were sections on domestic news, foreign news, economy, culture and sometimes sports. Its target reader was the educated middle class readers. The articles were mainly focussed on the details of the events in a rather humurious tongue.

== History ==
=== In 1950s ===
Akis was launched on 15 May 1954 by Metin Toker and two friends. Previously Metin Toker was one of the supporters of the Democrat Party (DP) and although the magazine claimed to be independent it was assumed to be a DP supporter. However, following the 1954 Turkish general election in which the DP government increased its control in the parliament, the party, originally a champion of democracy, changed its policy and began to tyrannize over the opposition and the press. One of the major discussions in the party was the right to prove. (Turkish: ispat hakkı). The press did not have the right to prove and the opposition press members frequently jailed for their reports. This caused a fission in the party (see Liberty Party). Thus after 1954, like most of the other DP supporters, Akis began to criticize the DP government and eventually became an important element of the opposition. Lack of right to prove was an important milestone in the history of Akis. In a trial known as Mükerrem Sarol vs Akis, although Akis proved its claims, it nevertheless was heavily punished by the court. (Mükerrem Sarol was a government minister in the 21st government of Turkey)

Furthermore, in 1955 Metin Toker married to Özden Toker, the daughter of İsmet İnönü, the leader of the main opposition party Republican People's Party (CHP). Metin Toker was the editor-in-chief of the magazine as was Kurtul Altuğ. They were both jailed in 1958 and the publication of Akis was suspended for two months by the court.

=== In 1960s ===
One of the last moves of the DP government was to authorize a political committee to trial opposition parties and press. Akis was also a victim of this committee and in April it was closed down. However, after the 1960 Turkish coup d'état on 27 May 1960, Akis was able to resume publication. Temporarily its circulation peaked at 150,000 copies. That was because public opinion considered Metin Toker as the mouthpiece of İsmet İnönü. Later, however, circulation began to fall partially because other political periodicals appeared. The last issue (706) was published on 31 December 1967. In the 705th issue on 25 December Kurtul Altuğ wrote an epilogue and explained that Akis could not compete with other periodicals published by media cartels.

== Notable writers of Akis ==
Metin Toker, Kurtul Altuğ, Cüneyt Arcayürek, Mümtaz Soysal, Doğan Avcıoğlu, İlhami Soysal, Cihat Baban, Teoman Erel, Haluk Ülman, Jale Candan, Güneri Civaoğlu.

== Sources ==
- Metin Toker (1991). Demokrasiden Darbeye. Ankara: Bilgi yayınları. ISBN 975-494-246-3.
- Meltem Onder. "Akis Journal During the Coup of 1960" (PDF). Journal of Modern Turkish History Studies.
- "Akis Dergisi". Biraz. Archived from the original on 24 December 2014.
- "Akis Sarol Davası". Filozof net.
