= Admiral Dundas =

Admiral Dundas may refer to:

- George Dundas (Royal Navy officer) (1778–1834), British Royal Navy rear admiral
- James Whitley Deans Dundas (1785–1862), British Royal Navy admiral
- John Dundas (Royal Navy officer) (1893–1952), British Royal Navy vice admiral
- Richard Saunders Dundas (1802–1861), British Royal Navy vice admiral
- Thomas Dundas (Royal Navy officer) (c. 1765–1841), British Royal Navy vice admiral
