= Cebeci Asri Cemetery =

Cemetery in Ankara, Turkey

Coordinates: 39.9481°N 32.8890°E

Cebeci Asri Mezarlığı
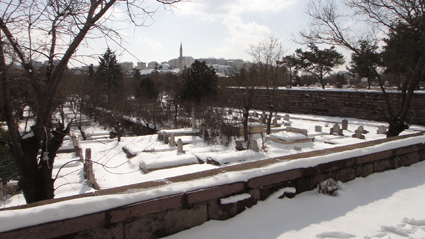
- Cebeci Asri Cemetery
- Interactive map of Cebeci Asri Mezarlığı

Details
- Location: Ankara
- Country: Turkey
- Type: Public
- No. of graves: 220,000

The Cebeci Asri Cemetery (Turkish: Cebeci Asri Mezarlığı) is a cemetery located in the Cebeci quarter of central Ankara, Turkey serving multiple religions. It was the first modern burial place in the capital city, and is the final resting place of many prominent figures.

As of 2005, the total number of graves in the Cebeci Asri Cemetery was 220,000, with 121,000 for males and 99,000 for females. The burial rate was two per day. Administered by the municipality, it is the second largest cemetery in Ankara after Karşıyaka Cemetery.

== Locating graves ==
In 2000, the Metropolitan Municipality of Ankara completed an information system (MEBİS) allowing visitors to search and locate a given person's grave within the three main cemeteries of Ankara. Computer terminals in interactive kiosks placed at the entrance of the cemetery enable visitors to quickly find the location of their relatives' graves. The system also shows the shortest path to graves on a cemetery plan.

== Improper burials ==
Most graves in the cemetery have an east-west alignment, as Muslims are buried facing southeast towards Mecca in accordance with Islamic law. Members of other religious groups, such as Jews and Christians, are buried in Cebeci Asri Cemetery with a north-south orientation.

Someone discovered that about ten thousand Muslims are buried with the incorrect north-south alignment. The director of cemeteries in Ankara announced that the mistake was made fifteen years ago, and could no longer be corrected. Diyanet İşleri Başkanlığı, the country's highest Islamic institution, supported this determination. It ruled that correction of the orientation of the graves would be disrespectful to the dead, and therefore unnecessary.

== Notable burials ==
Listed in alphabetical order of family names.

- Makbule Atadan (1887–1956), sister of Mustafa Kemal Atatürk
- Erkut Akbay (?–1982), diplomat assassinated along with his wife Nadide by a car bomb at the Turkish Embassy in Lisbon in 1982
- Osman Bölükbaşı (1913–2002), politician
- Mehmet Cavit Bey (1875–1926), economist, newspaper editor and politician
- İlhan Cavcav (1935–2017), chairman of Gençlerbirliği
- Necmettin Cevheri (1930–2023), politician
- Nazlı Ecevit (1900–1985), female school teacher and painter. Mother of four times Prime Minister Bülent Ecevit
- Nusret Fişek (1914–1990), academic and civil servant in public health
- Tunalı Hilmi (1871–1928), politician
- Tevfik İleri (1911–1961), politician and government minister
- Mevhibe İnönü (1897–1992), wife of the second President İsmet İnönü
- Hidayet İpek (1919–2014), military officer and pılitician
- Yakup Kadri Karaosmanoğlu (1880–1974), writer
- Uğur Mumcu (1942–1993), assassinated journalist
- Mammed Amin Rasulzade, founding father of Azerbaijan Democratic Republic
- Abdülhalik Renda (1881–1957), politician
- Aydın Sayılı (1913–1993), historian of science.
- Faruk Sükan (1921–2005), physician, politician and government minister
- Cahit Sıtkı Tarancı (1910–1956), poet
- Bahriye Üçok (1919–1990), assassinated journalist
- Hasan Âli Yücel (1897–1961), poet, politician and former government minister
