= Metin Toker =

Turkish journalist and writer (1924-2002)

- Born: 1924; Istanbul, Turkey
- Died: 18 July 2002 (aged 77–78); Ankara, Turkey
- Education: Galatasaray High School, Istanbul University
- Occupations: Journalist, writer
- Spouse: Özden İnönü (m. 1955)
- Children: 3, including Gülsün Bilgehan

Metin Toker (1924 – 18 July 2002) was a Turkish journalist and writer. He married the daughter of Turkey's second president, Özden Toker, in 1955, with whom he had 3 children.

== Life ==
He was born in Istanbul. After finishing Galatasaray High School, he studied French philology at Istanbul University graduating in 1948. He then went to France to study Political Sciences. In 1955 after returning home, he married Özden İnönü, the daughter of İsmet İnönü, the second president of Turkey (in office 1938–1950) and the leader of the Republican People's Party.

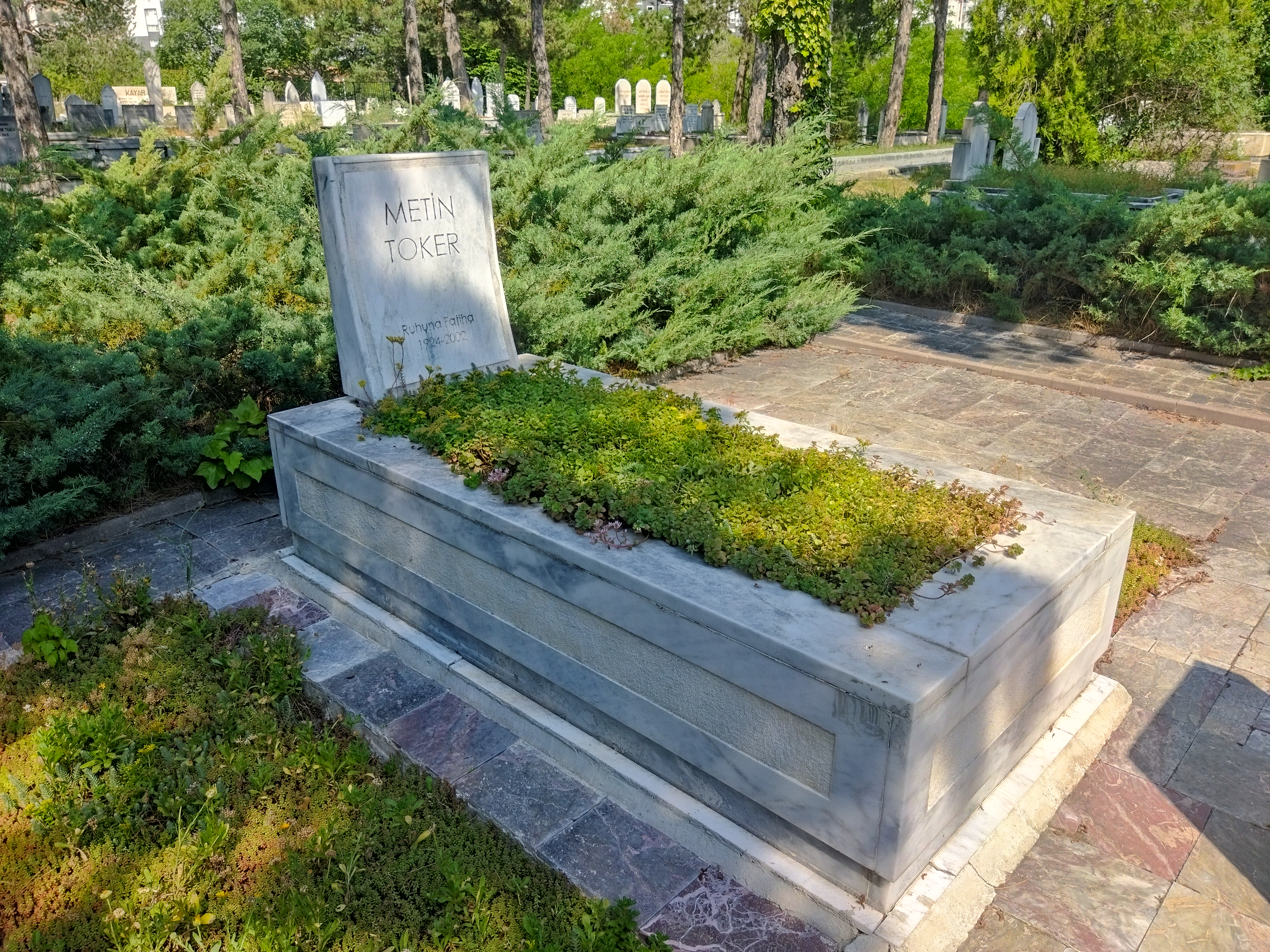
Metin Toker's grave at Cebeci Asri Cemetery

Metin Toker died on 18 July 2002 in Ibni Sina Hospital of Ankara University. He was laid to rest at the Cebeci Asri Cemetery in Ankara. He was survived by his wife, two daughters, Gülsün Bilgehan, Nurperi Özlen, a son Güçlü, and his grandchild named Maya.

== Career ==
While still in France, he began writing for the newspaper Cumhuriyet and made a name in journalism. Between 1954 and 1968, Toker published a political magazine named Akis ("Echo"). But during this time, he was tried and sentenced in a number of cases for his articles published. He continued publishing the periodical until 1968. After 1968, he became a columnist in the daily Milliyet.

According to Turkish constitution between 1961 and 1980, the presidents had the power of appointing 15 senators in addition to elected members of the Turkish Senate. Between 1977 and 1980, Metin Toker served as senator appointed by President Fahri Korutürk.

Following the dissolution of the parliament as a result of 1980 Turkish coup d'état, he returned to journalism.

== Books ==
Metin Toker translated Richard Llewellyn's novel How Green Was My Valley into Turkish with the title "Vadim O kadar Yeşildi ki". His other books are documentaries and memoirs about the recent/modern history of Turkey.

- Bir Diktatörün İktidar Yolu
- İsmet Paşayla On Yıl (7 volumes)
- Rus geldi Aşka, Rusun Aşkı başka
- Şeyh Sait İsyanı
- Avrupa Birşeyler Arıyor
- Dört Buhranlı Yıl
- Tek Partiden Çok Partiye
- Türkiye Üzerinde 1945 Kabusu
- Solda ve Sağda Vuruşanlar
- Orak ile Çekiç arasında kalanlar
- Not Defterinden
- İsmet Paşa'nın Son Yılları (1993) Bilgi yayınevi ISBN 975-494-176-9
