= Second Cairo Conference =

1943 WWII Allied conference with Turkey

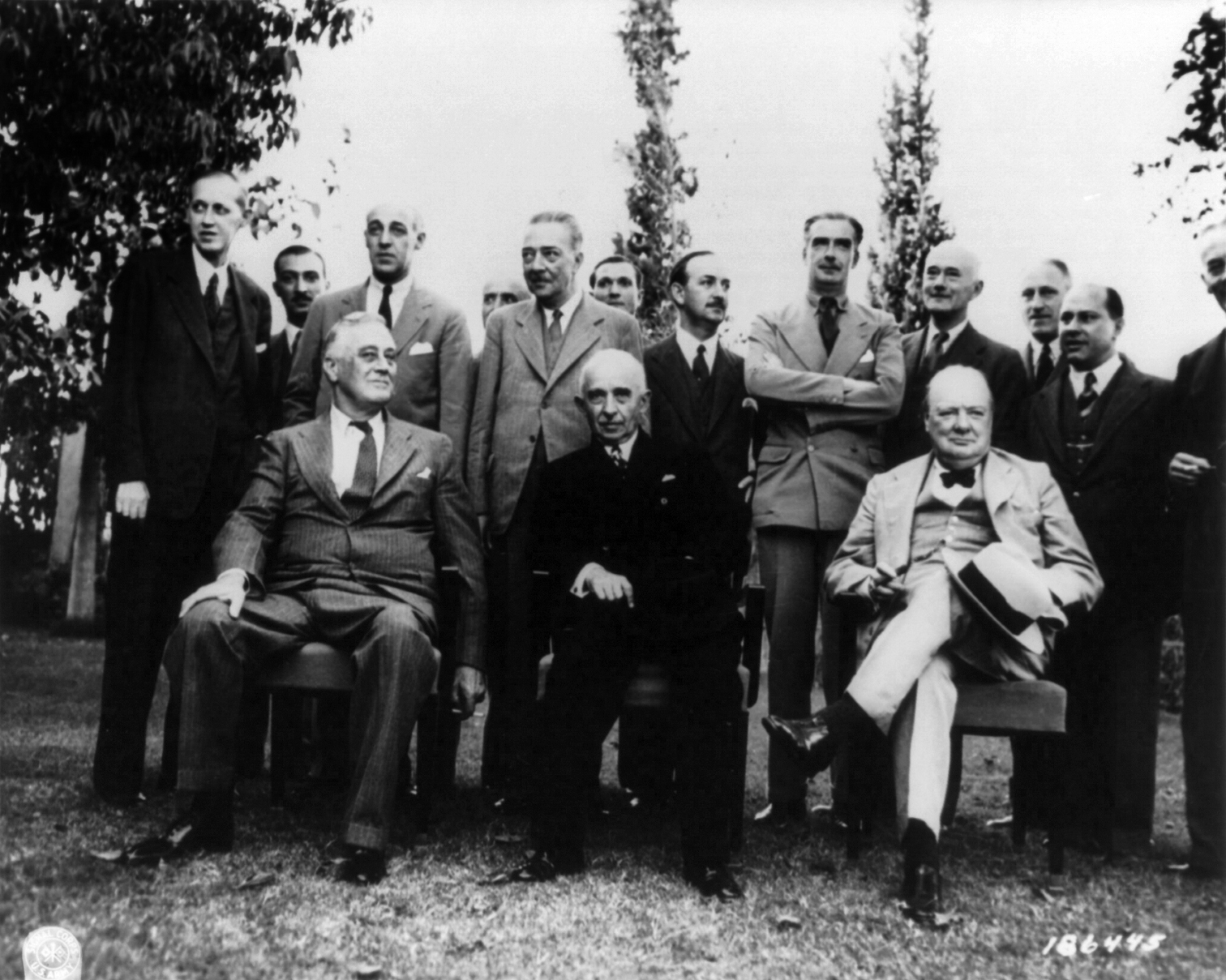
Roosevelt, İnönü and Churchill at the Second Cairo Conference, which was held between December 4–6, 1943.

The Second Cairo Conference of December 4–6, 1943 (codenamed Sextant), held in Cairo, Egypt, addressed Turkey's possible contribution to the Allies in World War II. The meeting was attended by President Franklin D. Roosevelt of the United States, Prime Minister Winston Churchill of the United Kingdom, and President İsmet İnönü of the Republic of Turkey.

Until 1941, both Roosevelt and Churchill maintained the opinion that Turkey's continuing neutrality would serve the interests of the Allies by blocking the Axis from reaching the strategic oil reserves of the Middle East. But the early victories of the Axis until the end of 1942 caused Roosevelt and Churchill to re-evaluate a possible Turkish participation in the war on the side of the Allies. Turkey had maintained a sizeable Army and Air Force throughout the war, and especially Churchill wanted the Turks to open a new front in the Balkans. Prior to the conference in Cairo, on January 30, 1943, Churchill had secretly met with İnönü inside a train wagon at the Yenice station, 23 kilometers outside of Adana in Turkey, to discuss the issue (see Adana Conference).

Roosevelt, on the other hand, still believed that a Turkish attack would be too risky and an eventual Turkish failure would have disastrous effects for the Allies.

İnönü knew well the hardships and losses of territory, population and wealth which his country had to suffer during 11 years of incessant war between 1911 and 1922 (the Italo-Turkish War, the Balkan Wars, the First World War, and the Turkish War of Independence), and was determined to keep Turkey out of another war as long as he could. İnönü also wanted assurances on financial and military aid for Turkey, as well as a guarantee that the United States and the United Kingdom would stand beside Turkey in case of a Soviet invasion of the Turkish Straits after the war, as Joseph Stalin had openly expressed. The fear of a Soviet invasion and Stalin's unconcealed desire to control the Turkish straits eventually caused Turkey to give up its principle of neutrality in foreign relations and join NATO in 1952.

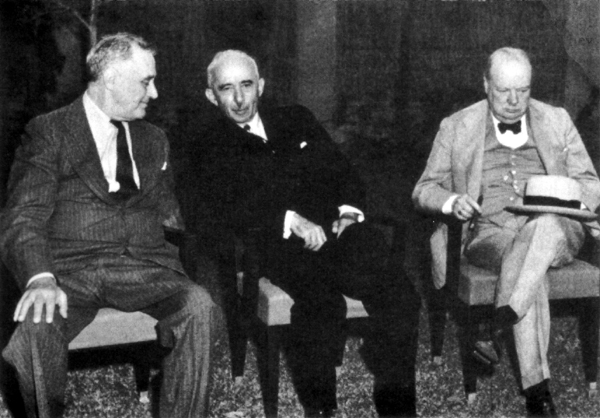
Roosevelt and İnönü got what they wanted, while Churchill was disappointed with the result.

Perhaps the biggest reason for Turkey's hesitation to immediately join the war on the side of the Allies was the eventual reduction of the amount of financial and military aid which Churchill had promised in Adana. By December 1943 the Anglo-American authorities felt the overall situation had changed so fundamentally that a much smaller scale of assistance than that provided in the Hardihood Agreement of the spring of 1943 would be necessary. The British proposed a reduced scale of Aid Plan Saturn. The Turks, on the other hand, wished to make certain that upon their entry into the war they would be strong enough to defend their homeland and they doubted that the new plan would fully meet their security needs. Churchill, faced with Operation Overlord only six months away, reluctantly concluded that the resources demanded and the time required for strengthening Turkey could not be conceded. The U.S. Chiefs of Staff and their planners, on the other hand, felt relieved that this possible threat to concentration on Operation Overlord had at last been removed.

At the end of the conference, it was decided that Turkey's neutrality should be maintained. It was also decided to build the Incirlik Air Base near Adana for possible Allied air operations in the region, but construction works began after the end of the Second World War. Incirlik Air Base later played an important role for NATO during the Cold War. Another decision was to postpone Operation Anakim against Japan in Burma.

Roosevelt and İnönü got what they wanted, while Churchill was disappointed with the result, because he believed that an active Turkish participation in the war would quicken the German defeat by hitting their "soft underbelly" in the southeast.

Turkey eventually joined the war on the side of the Allies on 23 February 1945, after it was announced at the Yalta Conference that only the states which were formally at war with Germany and Japan by 1 March 1945 would be admitted to the United Nations. However, Turkey did not directly participate in a military conflict; limiting its participation to providing materials and supplies for the Allies, and imposing political and economic sanctions on the Axis states.

Another discussed issue was the independence of Indochina from the French Colonial Empire, as documented briefly by the Pentagon Papers.

== See also ==
- Adana Conference of January 30–31, 1943, attended by President İsmet İnönü of Turkey and Prime Minister Winston Churchill of the United Kingdom.
- First Cairo Conference of November 22–26, 1943, attended by President Franklin Roosevelt of the United States, Prime Minister Winston Churchill of the United Kingdom, and Generalissimo Chiang Kai-shek of the Republic of China.
- List of Allied World War II conferences

== Sources ==
- "Sextant and Eureka Conferences, November–December 1943" (PDF). Sextant. World War II Inter-Allied Conferences. Washington, DC: Joint History Office, Joint Chiefs of Staff. 1943.
- "Diplomatic Papers, The Conferences at Cairo and Tehran, 1943". Sextant. Foreign Relations of the United States. Washington, DC: United States Government Printing Office. 1961.
