= Özden Toker =

Turkish patron of the arts and philanthropist

- Özden Toker as a child in the 1940s
- Born: Özden İnönü; February 7, 1930 (age 96); Ankara, Turkey
- Spouse: Metin Toker (m. 1955; died 2002)
- Children: 3, including Ayşe Gülsün Bilgehan
- Parents: İsmet İnönü; Mevhibe İnönü
- Awards: Mudanya Peace Road Award

Özden Toker (née İnönü; born February 7, 1930) is a Turkish patron of the arts and the daughter of Turkey's second president, İsmet İnönü.

== Early life ==
Toker was born Özden İnönü on February 7, 1930, in Ankara, Turkey's capital. According to Toker, Atatürk is the one who came up with her given name, Özden.

As a child, she was friends with Atatürk's adopted daughter, Ülkü Adatepe. She grew up with Atatürk frequently visiting Pembe Köşk, the İnönü household, in order to discuss politics with her father and their friends.

Toker was educated at Çankaya Primary School and Ankara Girls' High School. She later graduated from Ankara University, studying in the department of English language and literature. She also studied at University of Edinburgh.

== Career ==
Toker was one of the founding members of the İnönü Foundation and became its president in 1992 after the death of her mother, Mevhibe İnönü.

She has published two memoirs.

In 2022, Toker received the first Mudanya Peace Road Award awarded by Mudanya district in honor of the 100 year anniversary of the Armistice of Mudanya.

== Personal life ==
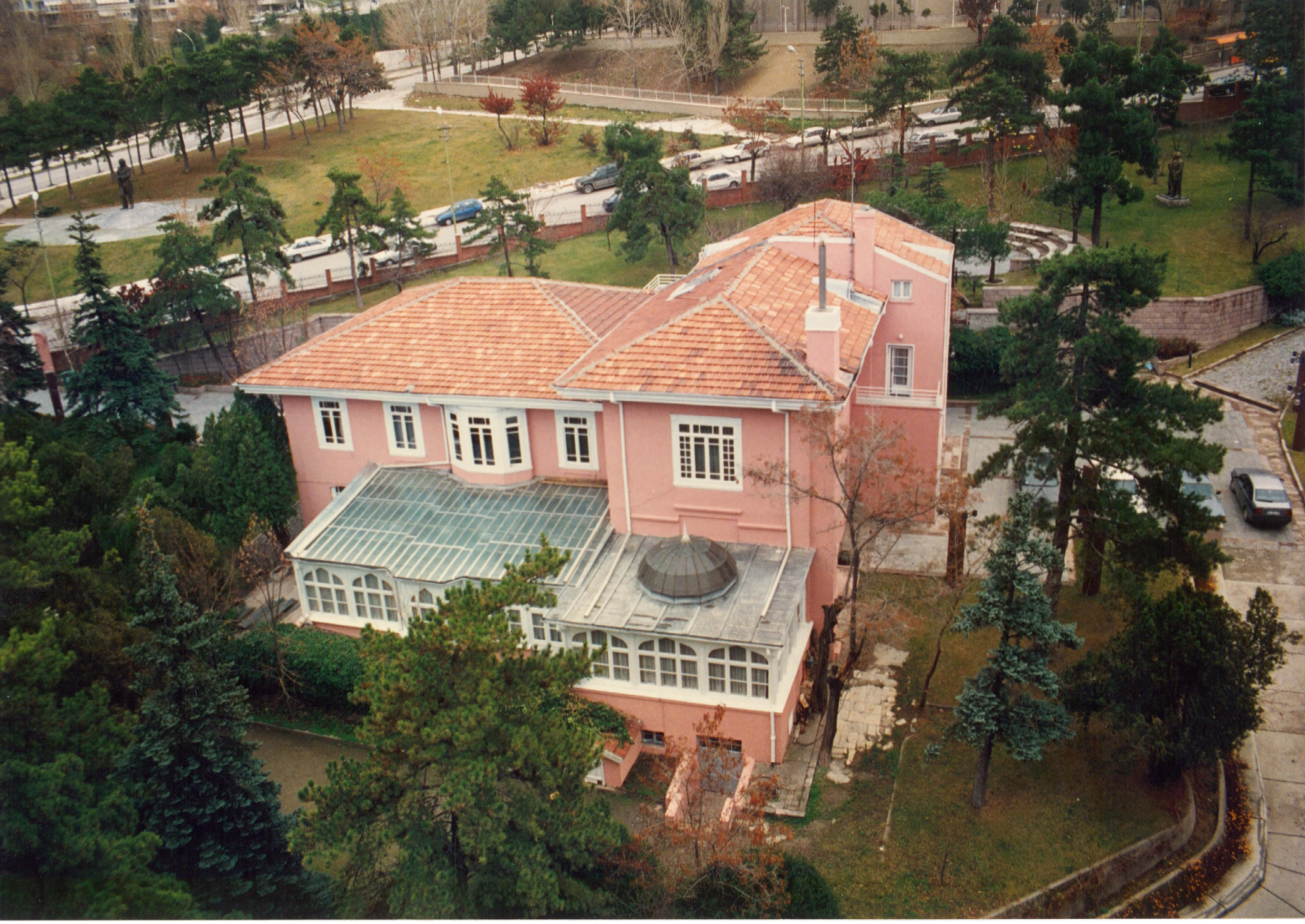
Pembe Köşk in 2008, Toker's home and residence

Toker (née İnönü) married journalist Metin Toker on February 9, 1955. When her husband was in prison, she supported his newspaper Akis. The couple had two daughters and a son: Nurperi, Ayşe Gülsün and Güçlü Toker. She has seven grandchildren.

Until 2019, Toker lived on the upper floors of Pembe Köşk. She had lived in this house for 89 years. Her decision to move out was primarily in order to allow the entire house to be open to tourists.

== Bibliography ==
- Cumhuriyet’le Özdeş Bir Yaşam: Özden Toker
- İsmet İnönü’nün Kızı Anlatıyor
