= Pembe Köşk =

Ottoman-era house in the Çankaya district of Ankara, Turkey

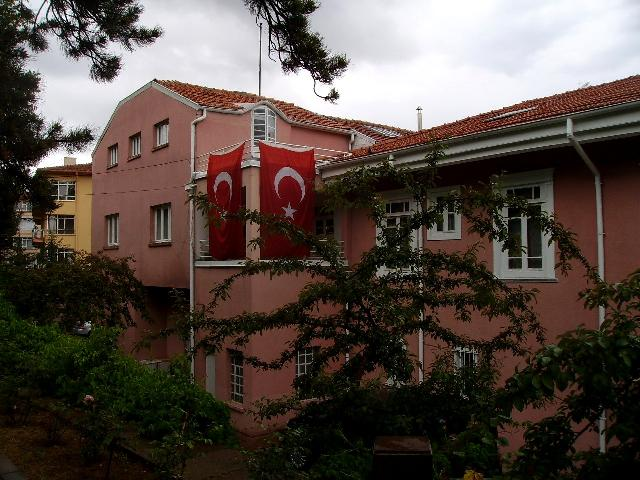
- Pembe Köşk
- Interactive map of the Pembe Köşk area

General information
- Architectural style: Ottoman orchard house
- Location: Ankara, Turkey
- Coordinates: 39.8948°N 32.8609°E
- Owner: Turkish state

Pembe Köşk (Pink Villa) is an Ottoman-era house in the Çankaya district of Ankara, Turkey, which is the city's oldest villa and was the home of Turkish President İsmet İnönü from 1925 to 1973.

İnönü purchased the villa and surrounding vineyard in 1923 from Mehmet Uzunzade. At the time, the villa only had two rooms and required two years of renovations before İnönü and his family could move in. The house was frequently used for strategic meetings by Mustafa Kemal Atatürk. Atatürk had a deep interest in the house's renovations, suggesting the dining room be made larger and ordering the furniture from an Istanbul-based firm named Jean Psalty. Ankara's first ball was held in a hall built at the request of Atatürk on the villa's grounds on 22 February, 1927. The color of the villa from which its name is derived was chosen by Atatürk, who had his own house painted the same color to add liveliness to Ankara.

While he was president of Turkey, İnönü and his family still regularly visited the house for special occasions and important events. During his periods as prime minister, İnönü hosted regular meetings with his ministers at the villa.

Experiments in cultivating trees and plants, in addition to horseback riding and show jumping competitions were held in the gardens. Some of the land occupied by the gardens was sold in the late 1970s so apartments could be built.

The building now houses a museum of İnönü's personal belongings and diplomatic photographs. The ground floor is opened to the public for one month between April and October of each year. Özden Toker was the house's last resident.
