= Ayşe Gülsün Bilgehan =

Turkish politician (born 1957)

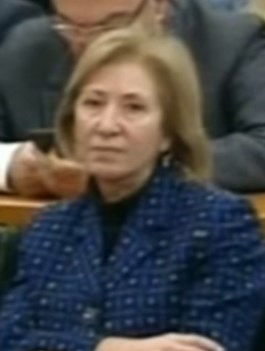

Deputy Leader of the Republican People's Party
- In office 25 December 2010 – 17 August 2011
- Leader: Kemal Kılıçdaroğlu

Deputy General Secretary of the Republican People's Party
- In office 22 May 2010 – 13 November 2010
- Leader: Kemal Kılıçdaroğlu
- Secretary: Önder Sav
- Preceded by: Mesut Değer
- Succeeded by: Didem Engin

Member of the Grand National Assembly
- In office 12 June 2011 – 24 June 2018
- Constituency: Ankara (II) (2011); Ankara (I) (June 2015, Nov 2015)
- In office 3 November 2002 – 22 July 2007
- Constituency: Ankara (I) (2002)

Personal details
- Born: 25 February 1957 (age 69) Ankara, Turkey
- Party: Republican People's Party (CHP)
- Education: Paris Institute of Political Studies
- Occupation: Politician
- Website: Personal website

Ayşe Gülsün Bilgehan (born Ayşe Gülsün Toker, 25 February 1957) is a Turkish politician from the Republican People's Party (CHP), who has served as the Member of Parliament for Ankara's first electoral district since 2015. She previously served as an MP for the same district from 2002 to 2007 and served as an MP for Ankara's second electoral district from 2011 to 2015. She is the granddaughter of İsmet İnönü, the second President of Turkey. Between 2010 and 2011, she served as a Deputy Leader of the CHP. She was offered, but declined, a ministerial position by Prime Minister Ahmet Davutoğlu during the formation of an interim election government in August 2015.

== Early life and career ==
Ayşe Gülsün was born on 25 February 1957 in Ankara, as the daughter of journalist Metin and Özden Toker. She was the granddaughter of the second President of Turkey, İsmet İnönü. She graduated from the International Relations department at the Paris Institute of Political Studies (Sciences Po) and later became a member of teaching staff at Bilkent University. She served as the Deputy President of the İnönü Foundation.

== Political career ==
=== Republican People's Party ===
Bilgehan was first elected as a Member of Parliament for Ankara's first electoral district in the 2002 general election, serving until 2007. At the Ordinary party Convention that took place on 22 May 2010, she was elected as the party's deputy general secretary. However, in November 2010, she and the party General Secretary Önder Sav resigned from their posts, intending to not take part in the leadership team of the newly elected party leader Kemal Kılıçdaroğlu. Nevertheless, Bilgehan returned to the party council in December 2010, becoming a deputy leader of the party. She resigned on 17 August 2011, shortly after being elected again as an MP, this time for Ankara's second electoral district at the 2011 general election. She was re-elected again at the June 2015 general election, this time from the first electoral district.

Bilgehan was one of the five CHP politicians who were offered ministerial positions by Justice and Development Party leader Ahmet Davutoğlu in August 2015. Davutoğlu had been tasked by President Recep Tayyip Erdoğan to form an interim election government after coalition negotiations proved unsuccessful and resulted in Erdoğan calling an early election. Since the CHP had 131 MPs during the formation of the interim government, the party was entitled to 5 ministries in the cabinet, though Kılıçdaroğlu announced that the CHP would not take part and give up their five ministries to independent politicians. Bilgehan subsequently declined Davutoğlu's offer, as did the four other CHP MPs that had been offered ministerial positions.

=== Council of Europe ===
When she first became an MP in 2002, Bilgehan began working at the Council of Europe. Between 27 January 2003 and 21 January 2008, she was a member of the Turkish delegation at the Parliamentary Assembly of the Council of Europe (PACE), in which she served as the chair of the Gender Opportunities Equality Commission between January 2006 and 21 January 2008. Since 3 October 2011, she became a member for the second time, serving as the treasurer of the PACE Socialist Group since the same year. Since January 2012, she has been the president of the Socialist Group Women's Working Group and since January 2015, she has been the president of the PACE Anti-Discrimination and Equality Commission.

Bilgehan has also served as a Turkish delegation member of the now-defunct Western European Union.

== Personal life ==
Bilgehan is married with three children and can speak both English and French. She has authored a book titled Mevhibe about the Turkish War of Independence, the establishment of the Turkish Republic and the first few years of the Republic from the point of view of Mevhibe Hanım, Bilgehan's grandmother. She received the Female Writer of the Year award from the Istanbul Union of Women's Associations and also the Abdi İpekçi award.

=== Awards and recognition ===
- Abdi İpekçi Award
- Female Writer of the Year

== See also ==
- Önder Sav
