= Battle of İnönü =

Battle of İnönü is the name of two battles of the Greco-Turkish War (1919–1922):

- First Battle of İnönü
- Second Battle of İnönü
