= İsmet İnönü =

President of Turkey (1938–1950)

Millî Şef İsmet İnönü
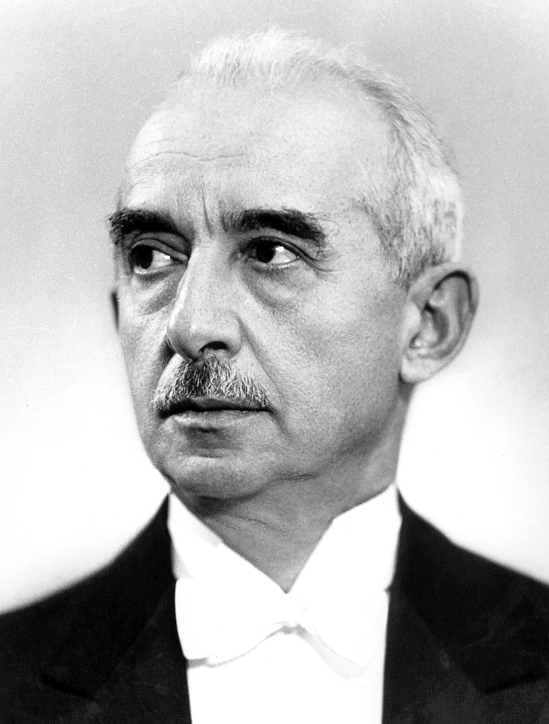
- İnönü in 1938

2nd President of Turkey
- In office 11 November 1938 – 22 May 1950
- Prime Minister: Celâl Bayar; Refik Saydam; Ahmet Fikri Tüzer; Şükrü Saracoğlu; Recep Peker; Hasan Saka; Şemsettin Günaltay
- Preceded by: Mustafa Kemal Atatürk
- Succeeded by: Celâl Bayar

1st Prime Minister of Turkey
- In office 20 November 1961 – 20 February 1965
- President: Cemal Gürsel
- Preceded by: Fahrettin Özdilek
- Succeeded by: Suat Hayri Ürgüplü
- In office 4 March 1925 – 25 October 1937
- President: Mustafa Kemal Atatürk
- Preceded by: Fethi Okyar
- Succeeded by: Celâl Bayar
- In office 30 October 1923 – 22 November 1924
- President: Mustafa Kemal Atatürk
- Preceded by: Fethi Okyar (as Prime Minister of the Government of the Grand National Assembly)
- Succeeded by: Fethi Okyar
Other political positions
2nd Leader of the Republican People's Party
In office 10 November 1938 – 8 May 1972
Preceded by	Mustafa Kemal Atatürk
Succeeded by	Bülent Ecevit
Member of the Grand National Assembly
In office 25 October 1961 – 20 November 1972
Constituency	Malatya (1961, 1965, 1969)
In office 14 May 1950 – 27 May 1960
Constituency	Malatya (1950, 1954, 1957)
In office 28 June 1923 – 10 November 1938
Constituency	Edirne (1923, 1927, 1931, 1935)
Minister of Foreign Affairs of Turkey
In office 26 October 1922 – 21 November 1924
Prime Minister	Rauf Orbay; Ali Fethi Okyar
Preceded by	Yusuf Kemal
Succeeded by	Şükrü Kaya
Chief of the General Staff of Turkey
In office 20 May 1920 – 3 August 1921
Preceded by	Office established
Succeeded by	Fevzi Çakmak

Personal details
- Born: Mustafa İsmet; 24 September 1884 Smyrna, Ottoman Empire
- Died: 25 December 1973 (aged 89) Ankara, Turkey
- Resting place: Anıtkabir, Ankara
- Party: Republican People's Party
- Spouse: Mevhibe İnönü (m. 1916)
- Children: 4, including Erdal and Özden
- Education: Imperial School of Military Engineering; Ottoman Military College

Military service
- Allegiance: Ottoman Empire (1903–1920); State of Turkey (1920–1923); Republic of Turkey (1923–1926)
- Branch/service: Ottoman Army; Army of the GNA; Turkish Army
- Rank: General
- Unit: Special Organization
- Battles/wars: See list: 31 March Incident; Yemeni Revolt; Balkan Wars; Bulgarian Front; World War I; Middle Eastern theatre; Caucasus Campaign; Sinai and Palestine Campaign; Nablus; Buqqar Ridge; Beersheba; Khan Ayash; Greco-Turkish War; İnönü I; İnönü II; Kütahya-Eskişehir; Great Offensive; Dumlupınar; Kurdish–Turkish conflict; Ararat rebellion; Dersim rebellion

Mustafa İsmet İnönü (Note: Turkish: [isˈmet ˈinœny]) (24 September 1884 – 25 December 1973) was a Turkish politician and military officer who served as the president of Turkey from 1938 to 1950, and as its prime minister three times: from 1923 to 1924, 1925 to 1937, and 1961 to 1965.

İnönü is acknowledged by many as Mustafa Kemal Atatürk's right-hand man, with their friendship going back to the Caucasus campaign. In the Greco-Turkish campaign of the Turkish War of Independence, he served as the first chief of the General Staff from 1920 to 1921 for the regular Turkish army, during which he commanded forces during the First and Second Battles of İnönü. Atatürk bestowed İsmet with the surname İnönü, the site of the battles, when the 1934 Surname Law was adopted. He served as the chief negotiator for the Ankara government, first as an army general following the defeat of invading forces during the Armistice of Mudanya talks, later as Minister of Foreign Affairs at the Lausanne Conferences (1922–1923). He secured recognition of the Turkish victory by the Allies and replacing the imposed Treaty of Sèvres with the Treaty of Lausanne. As prime minister for most of Atatürk's presidency, İnönü executed many of Atatürk's modernizing and nationalist reforms.

İnönü succeeded Atatürk as president of Turkey after his death in 1938 and was granted the official title of Millî Şef ("National Chief") by the parliament. As president and chairman of the Republican People's Party (CHP), İnönü initially continued Turkey's one party state. Kemalist style programs continued to make great strides in education by supporting projects such as Village Institutes. His governments implemented notably heavy statist economic policies. The Hatay State was annexed in 1939, and Turkey was able to maintain an armed neutrality during World War II, joining the Allied powers only three months before the end of hostilities in the European Theater. The Turkish Straits crisis prompted İnönü to build closer ties with the Western powers, with the country eventually joining NATO in 1952, though by then he was no longer president.

Factionalism between statists and liberals in the CHP led to the creation of the Democrat Party in 1946. İnönü held the first multiparty elections in the Republic's history that year, beginning Turkey's multiparty period. 1950 saw a peaceful transfer of power to the Democrats when the CHP suffered defeat in the elections. For ten years, İnönü served as the leader of the opposition before returning to power as prime minister following the 1961 election, held after the 1960 coup-d'état. The 1960s saw İnönü reinvent the CHP as a political party, which was "Left of Center" as a new party cadre led by Bülent Ecevit became more influential. İnönü remained leader of the CHP until 1972, when he was defeated by Ecevit in a leadership contest. He died on 25 December 1973, of a heart attack, at the age of 89. He is interred opposite to Atatürk's mausoleum at Anıtkabir in Ankara.

== Early life ==
İsmet İnönü (born Mustafa İsmet) was born in 1884 in Smyrna (İzmir) in the Aidin Vilayet to Hacı Reşid and Cevriye (later Cevriye Temelli). Hacı Reşid had retired after serving as director of the First Examinant Department of the Legal Affairs Bureau of the War Ministry (Harbiye Nezareti Muhakemat Dairesi Birinci Mümeyyizliği). A member of the Kürümoğlu family of Bitlis, İnönü's father was born in Malatya. According to its members studying the ancestral background of the family, Kürümoğlus were of Turkish origin, while secondary sources refer to the family as of Kurdish descent. His mother was the daughter of Müderris Hasan Efendi, who belonged to the ulema and was a member of the Turkish family of Razgrad in present-day Bulgaria. In 1933 İsmet visited Razgrad after the city's Turkish cemetery was attacked. İsmet was the family's second child; he had three brothers, including the family's first child, Ahmed Midhat, two younger brothers, Hasan Rıza and Hayri (Temelli), as well as a sister Seniha (Otakan). Due to his father's assignments, the family moved from one city to another.

== Military career ==
=== In the Ottoman Empire ===
İnönü completed his primary education in Sivas and graduated from Sivas Military Junior High School (Sivas Askerî Rüştiyesi) in 1894. He then studied at the Sivas School for Civil Servants (Sivas Mülkiye İdadisi) for a year. He graduated from the Imperial School of Military Engineering in 1904 as a lieutenant gunnery officer and entered the Military Academy to graduate as a first-rank staff captain on 26 September 1906. İnönü started his duty in the Second Army based in Adrianople (Edirne) on 2 October 1906, in the 3rd Battery Command of the 8th Field Artillery Regiment. As part of his platoon officer staff internship, he gave lessons in military strategy and artillery. Captain İsmet was also part of the Ottoman–Bulgarian commissions.

Through Ali Fethi (Okyar), he briefly joined the Committee of Union and Progress in 1907, which wished to overthrow Sultan Abdul Hamid II. During the 31 March Incident, he was on the staff of the Second Cavalry Division, which was mobilized to join the Action Army and marched on Constantinople (İstanbul) to depose Abdul Hamid II. Returning to Adrianople following the suppression of the mutiny, İnönü left the CUP in the summer of 1909.

He won his first military victory by suppressing Imam Yahya Muhammad Hamiddin's revolt in Yemen. İsmet eventually became chief of staff of the force sent to suppress the rebellion and personally negotiated with Imam Yahya in Kaffet-ül-Uzer to bring Yemen back into the empire. For this, he was promoted to the rank of major. He returned to Constantinople in March 1913 to defend the capital from Bulgarian attack during the First Balkan War. İnönü was part of the Turkish delegation that negotiated the Treaty of Constantinople with the Bulgarians as a military adviser. He held a close relationship with Enver Pasha and played an active role in the reformation of the army.

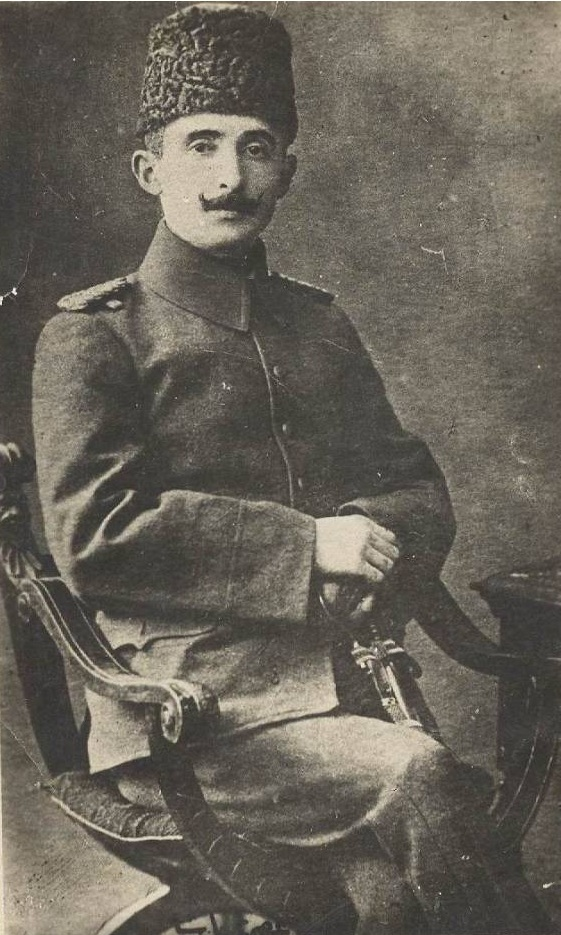
Captain İsmet Bey after returning from Yemen

=== World War I ===
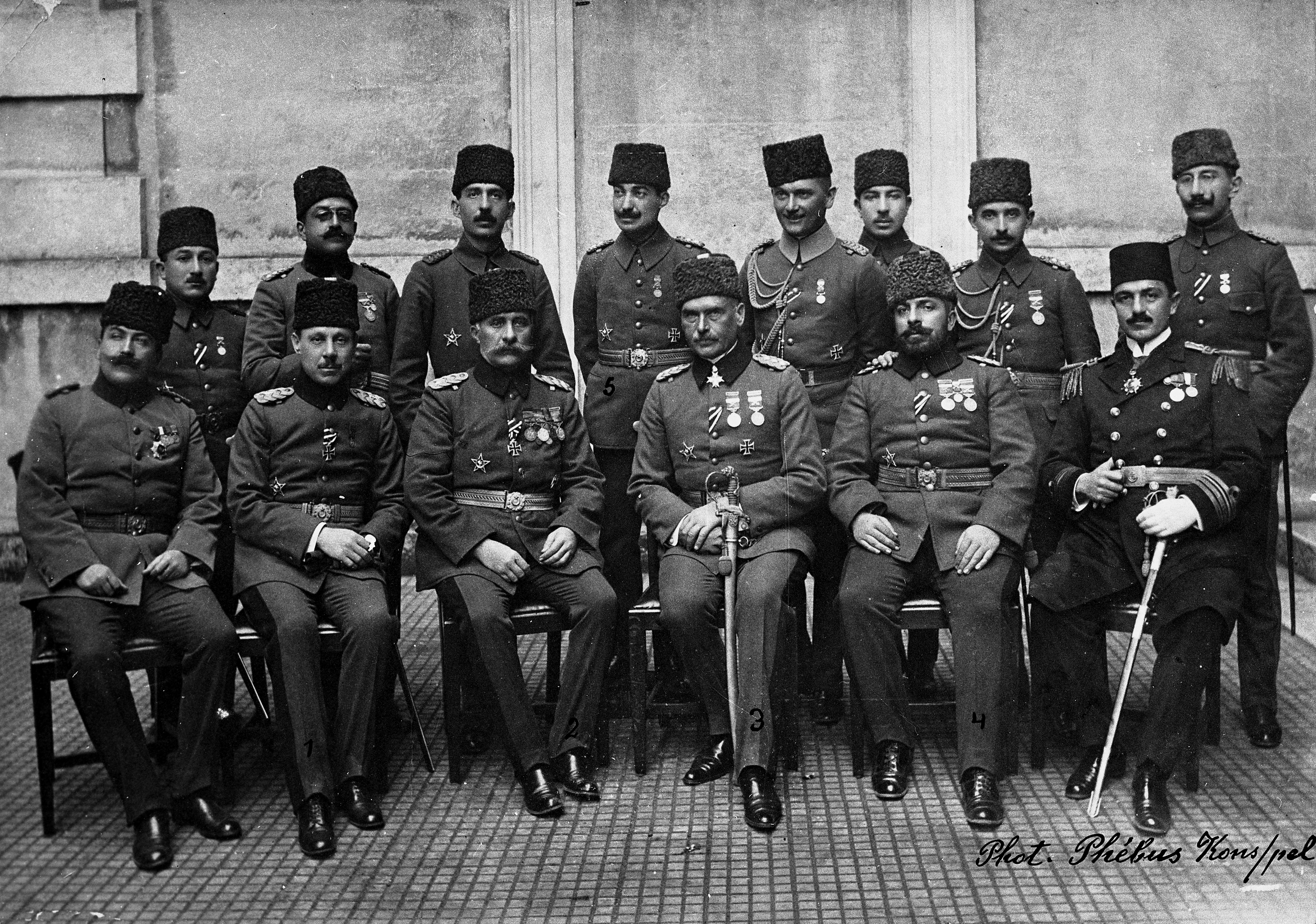
General staff of the Sinai and Palestine Campaign, 1914. İsmet İnönü can be seen on the top row second from the right side.

İnönü began climbing the ranks during World War I, becoming lieutenant colonel on 29 November 1914, and then being appointed as the First Branch Manager of the General Headquarters on 2 December. He was appointed chief of staff of the Second Army on 9 October 1915, and was promoted to the rank of colonel on 14 December 1915.

İnönü was a member of the Special Organization, an intelligence, paramilitary, and secret police organization in the Ottoman Empire known for its key role in the commission of the Armenian genocide. In his post in the Caucasus front, İnönü requested that Armenians should be either extradited to Russia or deported to inner Anatolia, weeks before the government ordered the deportation of all Armenians from the eastern border areas and the shores of Lake Van to the Syrian Desert.

He began working with Mustafa Kemal (Atatürk) Pasha as a corps commander on the Caucasian Front. İnönü was appointed to the IV Corps Command on 12 January 1917, upon the recommendation of Atatürk. He was recalled to Constantinople after a while and returned to take part as a corps commander of the Seventh Army. On 1 May, he was appointed to command XX Corps on the Palestine Front, and then III Corps on 20 June. He once again came into contact with Atatürk when he assumed command of the Seventh Army. İnönü's forces received the brunt of Edmond Allenby's attack on Beersheba that ended the stalemate on the Sinai front. He was wounded in the Battle of Megiddo and was sent back to Constantinople, where he held various administrative positions in the War Ministry during the armistice period.

=== Turkish War of Independence ===
After the military occupation of Constantinople on 16 March 1920, İnönü decided to escape to Anatolia to join the Ankara government. He and his chief of staff, Major Saffet (Arıkan) escaped Maltepe in the evening of 19 March and arrived in Ankara on 9 April. He joined the Grand National Assembly (GNA), which was opened on 23 April 1920, as a deputy of Edirne. Like many others in the Turkish National Movement, he was sentenced to death in absentia by the Ottoman government on 6 June 1920. In May 1920, he was appointed chief of the general staff. The next year, he was appointed commander of the Western Front of the Army of the GNA, a position in which he remained during the Turkish War of Independence. He was promoted to the rank of Mirliva (to that extent, Pasha) after winning the First and Second Battles of İnönü. When the 1934 Surname Law was adopted Atatürk bestowed İsmet Pasha with the surname İnönü, where the battles took place.

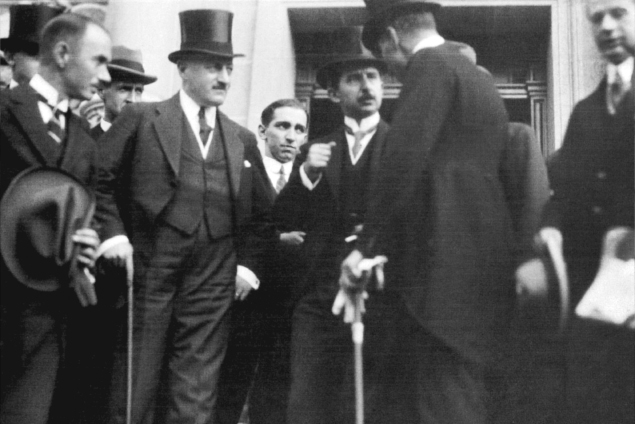
Turkish delegation after having signed the Treaty of Lausanne. The delegation was led by İsmet İnönü (in the middle) and Rıza Nur (on the left wearing the top hat).

İnönü was replaced by Mustafa Fevzi Pasha (Çakmak), who was also the prime minister and minister of defense at the time, as the chief of staff after the Turkish forces lost major battles against the advancing Greek Army in July 1921, as a result of which the cities of Afyonkarahisar, Kütahya and Eskişehir were temporarily lost. He participated as a staff officer (with the rank Brigadier General) in the later battles, including the Battle of the Sakarya and Dumlupınar.

=== Chief negotiator in Mudanya and Lausanne ===
After the War of Independence was won, İnönü was appointed as the chief negotiator of the Turkish delegation, both for the Armistice of Mudanya and for the Treaty of Lausanne.

The Lausanne conference convened in late 1922 to settle the terms of a new treaty that would take the place of the Treaty of Sèvres. İnönü became famous for his stubborn resolve in determining the position of Ankara as the legitimate, sovereign government of Turkey. After delivering his position, İsmet turned off his hearing aid during the speeches of British foreign secretary Lord Curzon. When Curzon had finished, İnönü reiterated his position as if Curzon had never said a word. Bulgarian diplomat Nadejda Stancioff served as an intermediary between İnönü and Curzon.

== Prime ministership ==
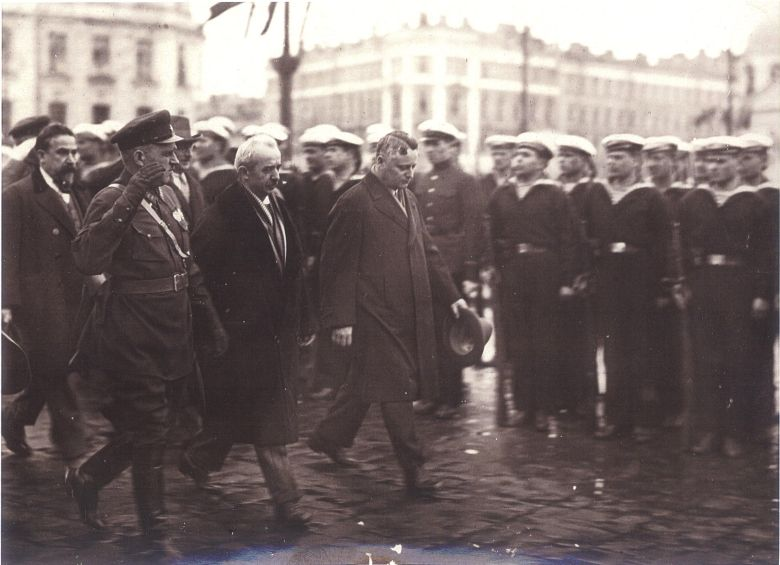
İnönü's Leningrad visit, 1932

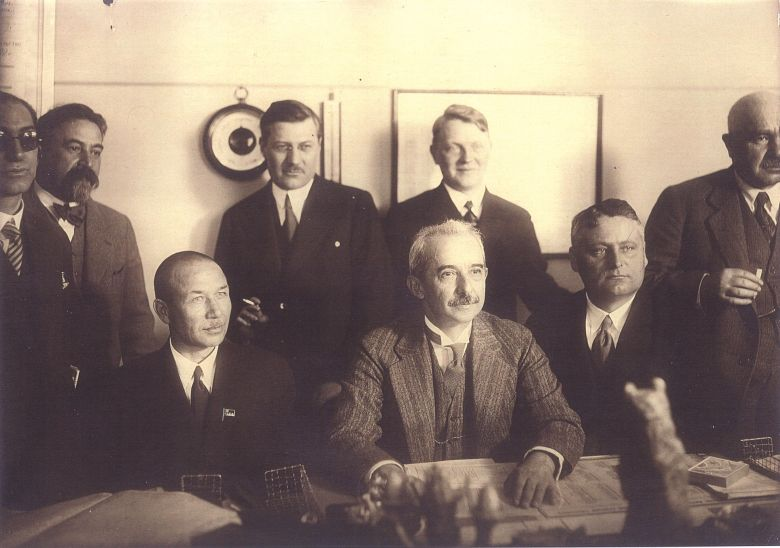
İnönü's Moscow visit, 1932

İsmet İnönü served as the prime minister of Turkey throughout Mustafa Kemal Atatürk's presidency, stepping down as prime minister for three months during Fethi Okyar's premiership and in the last year of Atatürk's presidency when he was replaced by Celâl Bayar. He therefore helped to execute most of Atatürk's reformist programs. It was his suggestion to make Ankara the capital of Turkey, which was approved by the parliament. İnönü was also an important factor in the proclamation of the Republic and the abolition of the Caliphate and Evkaf Ministry. He resigned from the premiership for health reasons on 22 November 1924 for Fethi Okyar, but since Okyar lost a vote of confidence from parliament due to the Sheikh Said rebellion, İnönü returned to the position of prime minister.

İnönü immediately banned all opposition parties (including the Progressive Republican Party) and the press. Independence Tribunals were reestablished to prosecute the Kurdish rebels. In 1926, it allegedly came out that former members of the CUP attempted to assassinate Atatürk in the İzmir plot, which resulted in the remaining CUP leaders being executed. İnönü retired his military command in 1927.

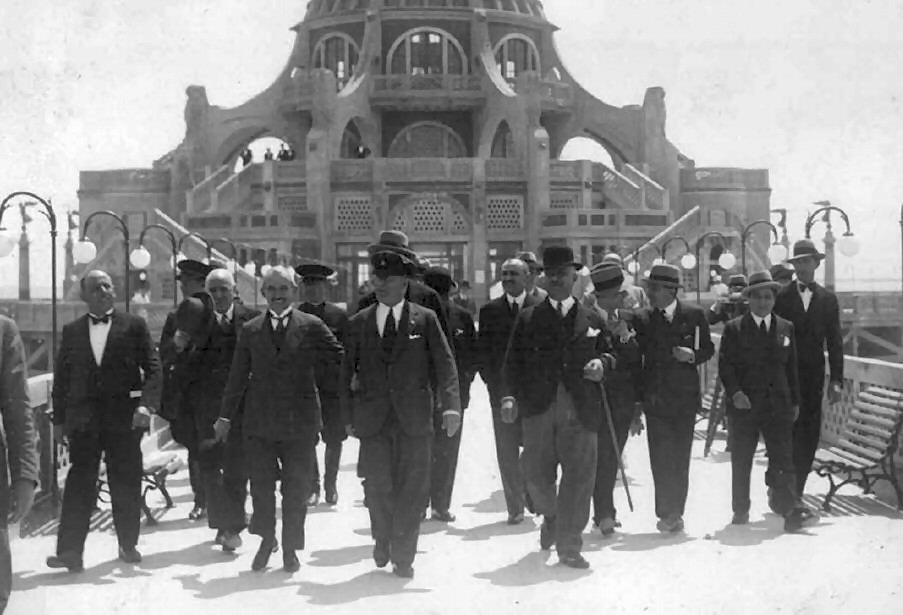
İnönü (second from left) and Mussolini (center) in Ostia, Rome in 1932

=== Nationalist policy ===
While dealing with the Sheikh Said revolt, İnönü proclaimed a Turkish nationalist policy and encouraged the Turkification of the non-Turkish population. Following the suppression of the Sheikh Said rebellion, he presided over the Reform Council for the East, which prepared the Report for Reform in the East, which recommended impede the establishment of a Kurdish elite, forbid non-Turkish languages, and create regional administrative units called Inspectorates-General, which were to be governed by martial law. He stated the following in regards to the Kurds; "We're frankly nationalists, and nationalism is our only factor of cohesion. Before the Turkish majority, other elements had no kind of influence. At any price, we must Turkify the inhabitants of our land, and we will annihilate those who oppose." Following this report, three Inspectorate-Generals were established in the Kurdish areas, which comprise several provinces.

Under İnönü's regime, the Zilan massacre of thousands of Kurdish civilians was perpetrated by the Turkish Land Forces in the Zilan Valley of Van Province on 12 and 13 July 1930, during the Ararat rebellion. Nation building was codified into law when a new settlement regime was enacted in 1934, resettling Albanians, Abkhazians, Circassians, and Kurds in new areas in order to create a homogeneous Turkish state. İnönü is also considered one of the perpetrators of the Dersim massacre, being one of the parties responsible for the violence.

=== Social policy ===
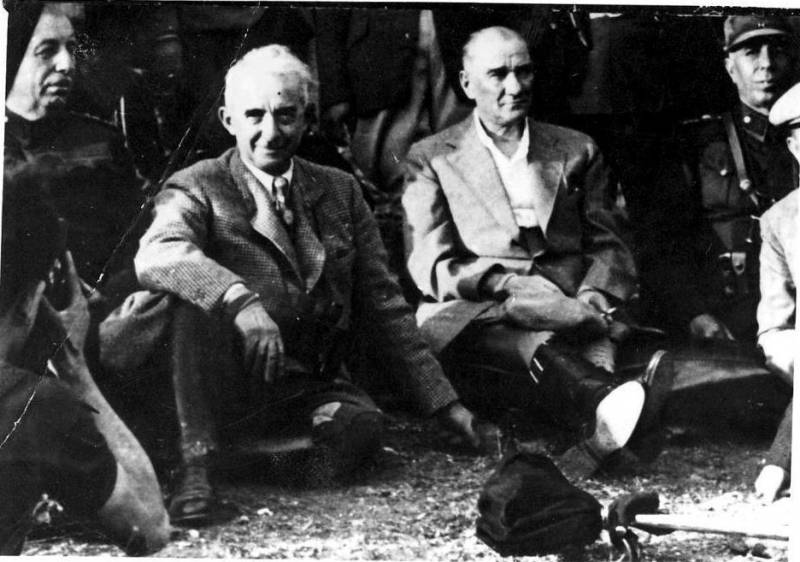
Atatürk and İnönü observing the Thracian Maneuvers

İnönü was responsible for most of the reformist legislation promulgated during Turkey's one party period. The Hat Law and the closure of Dervish lodges were enacted in 1925; in 1928, the Turkish alphabet switched to being written with Latin characters, and in 1934, titles such as Efendi, Bey, and Pasha were abolished; and certain articles of religious clothing were banned, though İnönü was and still is popularly known as İsmet Pasha. 1934 was also the year that the Surname Law was adopted, with Mustafa Kemal Atatürk bestowing İsmet with the surname İnönü, the location where İsmet won the battles against the Greek army in 1921. He was also a proponent of replacing foreign loan words with "Pure Turkish" words.

=== Economic policy ===
İnönü managed the economy with heavy-handed government intervention, especially during the Great Depression, by implementing an economic plan inspired by the Five Year Plan of the Soviet Union. In doing so, he took much private property under government control. Due to his efforts, to this day, more than 70% of land in Turkey is still owned by the state.

Desiring a more liberal economic system, Atatürk dissolved the government of İnönü in 1937 and appointed Celâl Bayar, the founder of the first Turkish commercial bank, Türkiye İş Bankası, as prime minister, thus beginning a decades long rivalry between Bayar and İnönü.

== Presidency (1938–1950) ==
=== Prewar ===
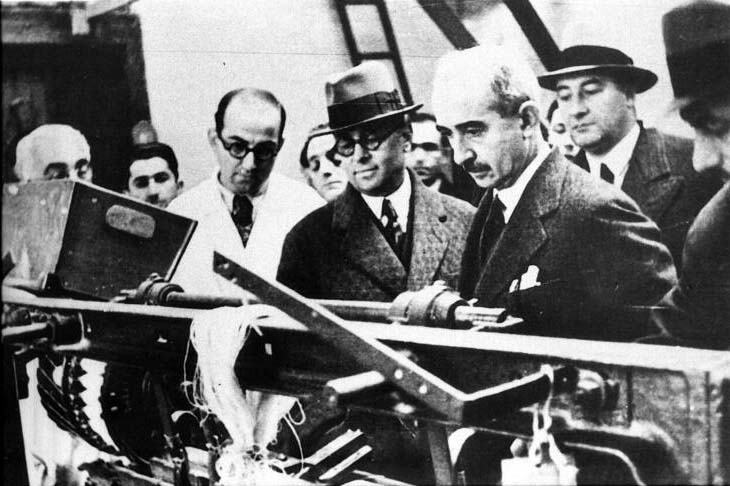
Celâl Bayar and İnönü visiting the Bakırköy Cloth Factory

After the death of Atatürk on 10 November 1938, İnönü was viewed as the most appropriate candidate to succeed him and was unanimously elected the second president of the Republic of Turkey and leader of the Republican People's Party (CHP). He attempted to build himself a cult of personality by receiving the official title of Millî Şef, i.e., "National Chief".

One of his first actions was to annex in 1939 the Hatay State, which declared independence from French Syria. İnönü also wished to move on from one-party rule by taking incremental steps to multiparty politics. He hoped to accomplish this by establishing the Independent Group as a force of opposition in the parliament, but they fell short of expectations under wartime conditions. İnönü dismissed Bayar's government because of differences between the two on economic policy in 1939. İnönü was an avowed statist, while Bayar wished for a more liberal economy. Turkey's early industrialization accelerated under İnönü but the onset of World War II disrupted economic growth.

Much reform in education was accomplished during İnönü's presidency through the efforts of Hasan Âli Yücel, who was minister of education throughout İnönü's governments. 1940 saw the establishment of the Village Institutes, in which well-performing students from the country were selected to train as teachers and return to their hometown to run community development programs.

=== World War II ===
==== Foreign policy ====
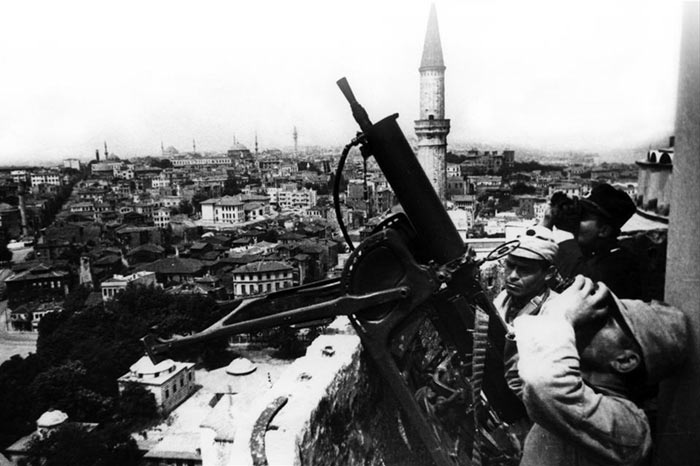
MG08 machine gun on the minaret of the Hagia Sophia 1941

World War II broke out in the first year of his presidency, and both the Allies and the Axis pressured İnönü to bring Turkey into the war on their side. The Germans sent Franz von Papen to Ankara in April 1939, while the British sent Hughe Knatchbull-Hugessen and the French René Massigli. On 23 April 1939, Turkish Foreign Minister Şükrü Saracoğlu told Knatchbull-Hugessen of his nation's fears of Italian claims to the Mediterranean as Mare Nostrum and German control of the Balkans and suggested an Anglo-Soviet-Turkish alliance as the best way of countering the Axis. In May 1939, during the visit of Maxime Weygand to Turkey, İnönü told the French Ambassador René Massigli that he believed that the best way of stopping Germany was an alliance of Turkey, the Soviet Union, France and Britain; that if such an alliance came into being, the Turks would allow Soviet ground and air forces onto their soil; and that he wanted a major programme of French military aid to modernize the Turkish armed forces.

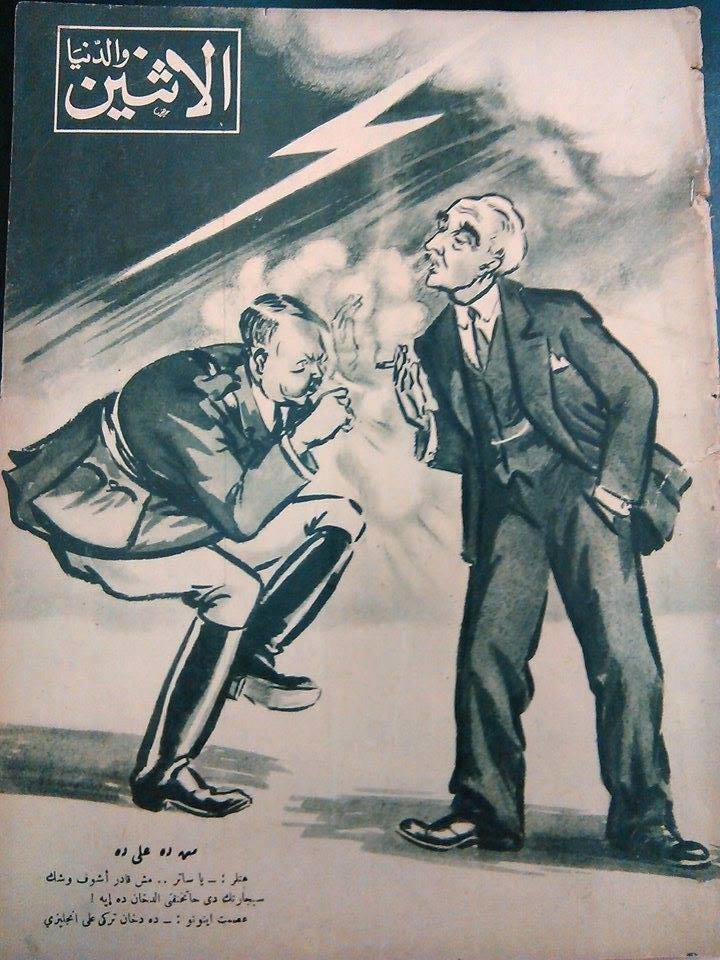
31 March 1941 Egyptian political cartoon showing Hitler being rebuffed by Turkish President İsmet İnönü.

The signing of the Molotov–Ribbentrop Pact on 23 August 1939, drew Turkey away from the Allies; the Turks always believed that it was essential to have the Soviet Union as an ally to counter Germany, and thus the signing of the German–Soviet pact undercut completely the assumptions behind Turkish security policy. With the signing of the Molotov–Ribbentrop pact, İnönü chose to be neutral in World War II as taking on Germany and the Soviet Union at the same time would be too much for Turkey, though he signed a tripartite treaty of alliance with Britain and France on 19 October 1939, obligating Turkey's entry into the war if fighting spread to the Mediterranean. However, with France's defeat in June 1940 İnönü abandoned the pro-Allied neutrality that he had followed since the beginning of the war. A major embarrassment for the Turks occurred in July 1940 when the Germans captured and published documents from the Quai d'Orsay in Paris showing the Turks were aware of Operation Pike—as the Anglo–French plan in the winter of 1939–40 to bomb the oil fields in the Soviet Union from Turkey was codenamed—which was intended by Berlin to worsen relations between Ankara and Moscow. In turn, worsening relations between the Soviet Union and Turkey were intended to drive Turkey into the arms of the Reich. After the publication of the French documents relating to Operation Pike, İnönü pulled out of the tripartite pact signed with Britain and France and signed the German–Turkish Treaty of Friendship and the Clodius Agreement, which placed Turkey within the German economic sphere of influence, but İnönü went no further towards the Axis.

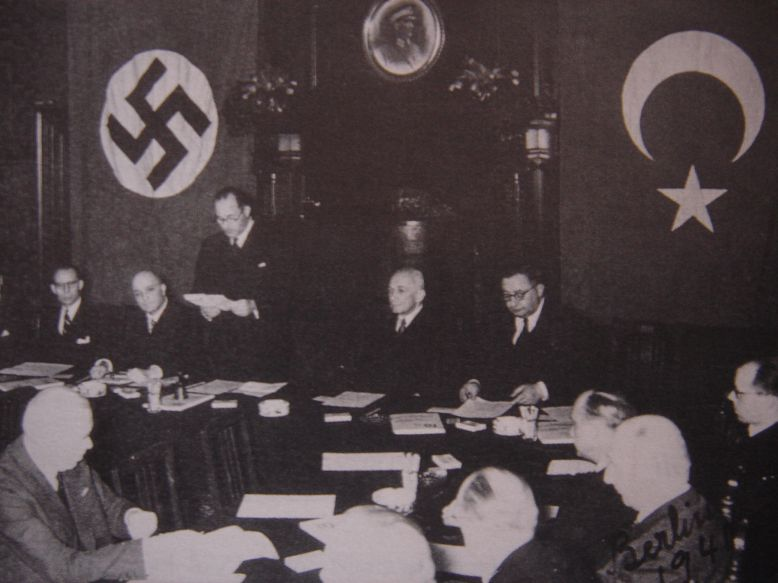
Franz von Papen and Şükrü Saraçoğlu signing the Turkish-German friendship treaty

In the first half of 1941, Germany, which was intent on invading the Soviet Union, went out of its way to improve relations with Turkey as the Reich hoped for benevolent Turkish neutrality when the German-Soviet war began. At the same time, the British had great hopes in the spring of 1941 when they dispatched an expeditionary force to Greece that İnönü could be persuaded to enter the war on the Allied side as the British leadership had high hopes of creating a Balkan front that would tie down German forces, which thus led to a major British diplomatic offensive with Foreign Secretary Sir Anthony Eden visiting Ankara several times to meet with İnönü. İnönü always told Eden that the Turks would not join the British forces in Greece, and the Turks would only enter the war if Germany attacked Turkey. For his part, Papen offered İnönü parts of Greece if Turkey were to enter the war on the Axis side, an offer İnönü declined. In May 1941 when the Germans dispatched an expeditionary force to Iraq to fight against the British, İnönü refused Papen's request that the German forces be allowed transit rights to Iraq. Another attempt by Hitler to woo Turkey came in February 1943, when Talaat Pasha's remains were returned to Turkey for a state burial.

Internal opposition to Turkish neutrality came from ultra-nationalist circles and factions of the military that wished to incorporate the Turkic-populated areas of the Soviet Union by allying with Germany. This almost erupted into a coup d'état against the government. Leading pan-Turkists including Alparslan Türkeş, Nihal Atsız, and Şaik Gökyay were arrested and sentenced to time in prison in the Racism-Turanism trials.

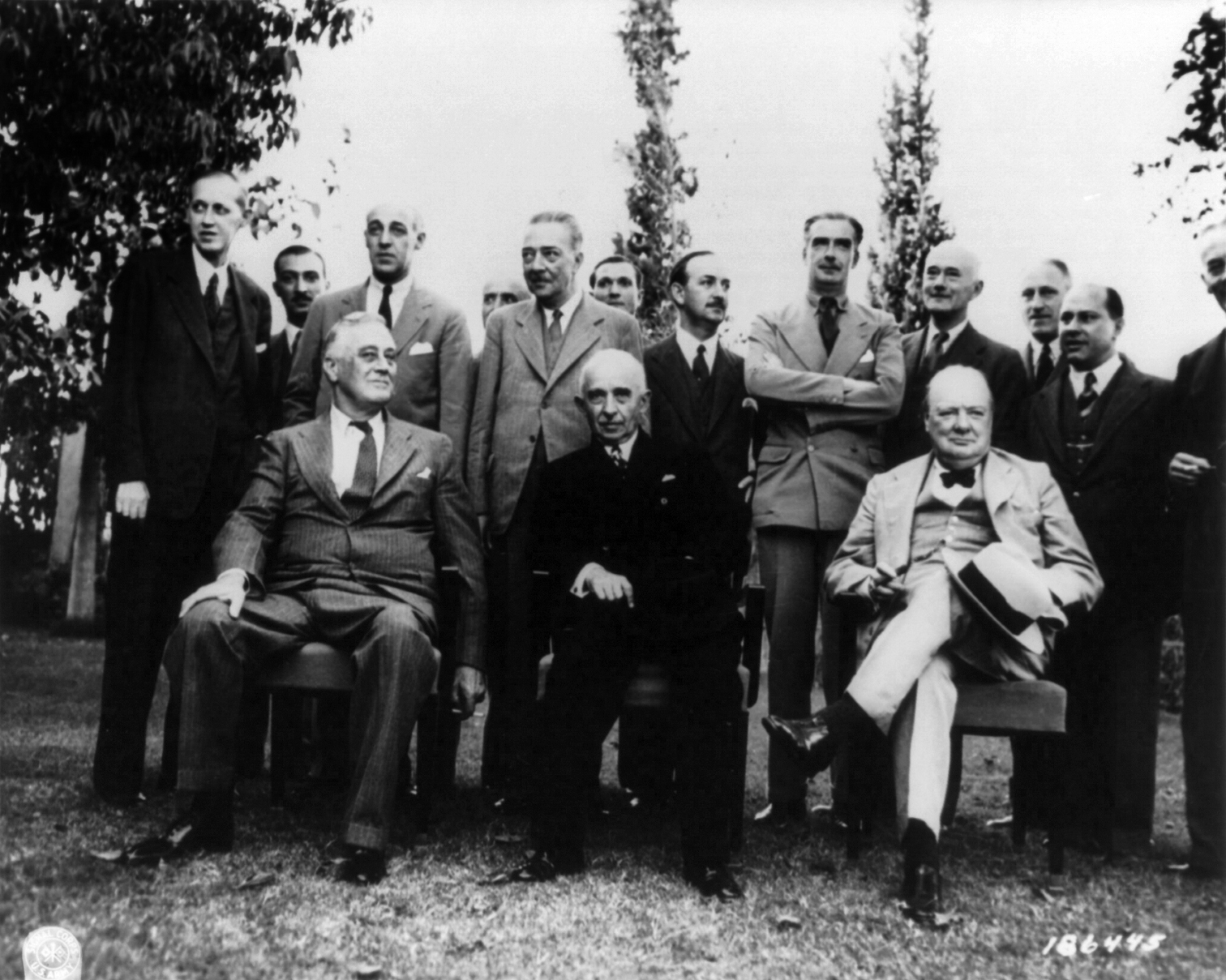
Roosevelt, İnönü and Churchill at the Second Cairo Conference on 4–6 December 1943

British Prime Minister Winston Churchill traveled to Ankara in January 1943 for a conference with President İnönu to urge Turkey's entry into the war on the allied side. Churchill met secretly with İnönü inside a railroad car at the Yenice Station near Adana. By 4–6 December 1943, İnönü felt confident enough about the outcome of the war that he met openly with Franklin D. Roosevelt and Winston Churchill at the Second Cairo Conference. Until 1941, both Roosevelt and Churchill thought that Turkey's continued neutrality would serve the interests of the Allies by blocking the Axis from reaching the strategic oil reserves of the Middle East. But the early victories of the Axis up to the end of 1942 caused Roosevelt and Churchill to re-evaluate possible Turkish participation in the war on the side of the Allies. Turkey had maintained a decently-sized army and air force throughout the war, and Churchill wanted the Turks to open a new front in the Balkans. Roosevelt, on the other hand, still believed that a Turkish attack would be too risky and an eventual Turkish failure would have disastrous effects for the Allies.

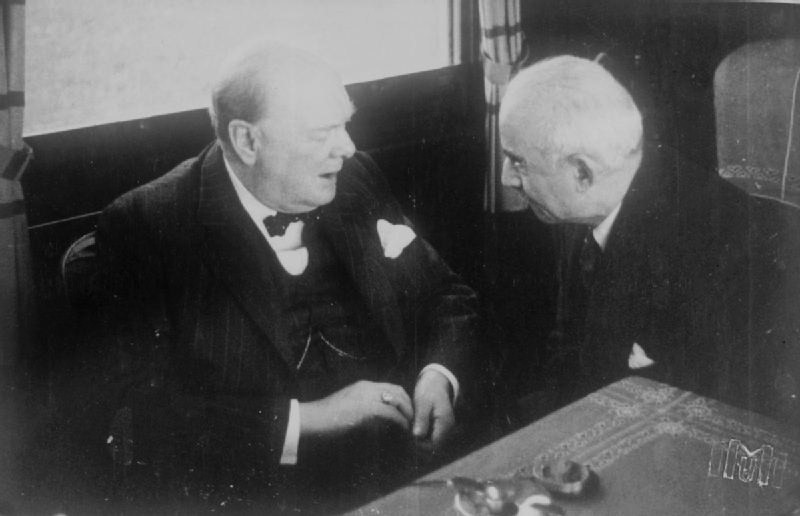
Winston Churchill and İsmet İnönü in conversation during a two-day secret conference in a train car at Adana, near the Turkish-Syrian border

İnönü knew very well the hardships that his country had suffered during decades of incessant war between 1908 and 1922 and was determined to keep Turkey out of another war as long as he could. The young Turkish Republic was still re-building, recovering from the losses due to earlier wars, and lacked any modern weapons and the infrastructure to enter a war to be fought along and possibly within its borders. İnönü based his neutrality policy during the Second World War on the premise that Western Allies and the Soviet Union would sooner or later have a falling out after the war. Thus, İnönu wanted assurances on financial and military aid for Turkey, as well as a guarantee that the United States and the United Kingdom would stand beside Turkey in the event of a Soviet invasion of the Turkish Straits after the war. In August 1944, İnönü broke off diplomatic relations with Germany, and on 5 January 1945, İnönü severed diplomatic relations with Japan. Shortly afterwards, İnönü allowed Allied shipping to use the Turkish Straits to send supplies to the Soviet Union, and on 25 February 1945, he declared war on Germany and Japan. For this Turkey became a founding member of the United Nations.

The post-war tensions and arguments surrounding the Turkish Straits would come to be known as the Turkish Straits crisis. The fear of Soviet invasion and Joseph Stalin's unconcealed desire for Soviet military bases in the Turkish Straits eventually caused Turkey to give up its principle of neutrality in foreign relations and join NATO in February 1952.

==== Domestic policy ====
Maintaining an armed neutrality proved to be disruptive for the young republic. The country existed in a practical state of war throughout the Second World War: military production was prioritized at the expense of peacetime goods, rationing and curfews were implemented, and high taxes were put in place, causing severe economic hardship for many. One such tax was the Wealth Tax (Varlık Vergisi), a discriminatory tax that demanded very high one-time payments from Turkey's non-Muslim minorities. This tax is seen by many to be a continuation of the Jizya tax paid by dhimmis during Ottoman times, or Millî İktisat (National Economy) economic policy implemented by the Committee of Union and Progress regime three decades ago. It was only repealed in 1944 under American and British pressure.

A famous story of İnönü happened in a meeting in Bursa for the 1969 general elections. A young man yelled at him, "You let us go without food!" İnönü replied to him by saying, "Yes, I let you go without food, but I did not let you become fatherless," implying the death of millions of people from both sides of World War II.

=== Post-War democratization ===
For the Kemalists there was always a desire for Turkey to develop into a democracy. Before the Independent Group, Atatürk experimented with opposition through the Liberal Republican Party, which lasted three months before it had to be shut down when reactionaries threatened to hijack the party. In an opening speech to the Grand National Assembly on 1 November 1945, İnönü openly expressed the country's need for an opposition party. He welcomed Celâl Bayar establishing the Democrat Party (DP), which separated from the CHP. However, due to the anti-Communist hysteria brought on by the new Soviet threat, new leftist parties were swiftly banned, and rural development initiatives such as the Village Institutes and People's Rooms were closed. Even with such pressure on the left, İnönü established the Ministry of Labour in 1945 and signed into law important protections for workers. Universities were given autonomy, and İnönü's title of "unchangeable chairman" of CHP was abolished.

İnönü allowed for Turkey's first multiparty elections to be held in 1946; however, the elections were not free and fair; voting was carried out under the gaze of onlookers who could determine which voters had voted for which parties, and secrecy prevailed as to the subsequent counting of votes. Instead of inviting Şükrü Saraçoğlu to form another government, he assigned CHP hardliner Recep Peker to the task, who contributed to a polarizing atmosphere in the parliament. İnönü had to act as a mediator several times between Peker and Bayar, who threatened to have the DP walk from parliament if they didn't have some of their demands met, such as ensuring judicial review, secret ballots, and public counting for elections. On 12 July 1947 İsmet İnönü gave a speech broadcast on radio and in newspapers that he would stand equal distance from the government and opposition, prompting Peker's resignation.

Free and fair national elections had to wait until 1950, and on that occasion, İnönü's government was defeated. In the 1950 election campaign, the leading figures of the Democrat Party used the slogan "Geldi İsmet, kesildi kısmet" ("İsmet arrived, [our] fortune left"). CHP lost the election with 41% of the vote against DP's 55%, but due to the winner-takes-all electoral system, DP received 85% of the seats in parliament. İnönü presided over the peaceful transfer of power to the DP leaders, Bayar and Adnan Menderes. Bayar would serve as Turkey's third president, and Menderes would be its first prime minister not from the CHP.

== Leader of the opposition (1950–1960) ==
For ten years, İnönü served as the leader of the opposition. In opposition, the CHP established its youth and women's branches. On 22 June 1953, the establishment of trade unions and vocational chambers was proposed, and the right to strike for workers was added to the party program. The CHP formed an electoral alliance with the Republican Nation Party and Liberty party for the 1957 election, which was blocked by the DP government.

In the lead-up to the elections prepared for 1960, İnönü and CHP members faced regular harassment from the authorities and DP supporters, to the point where he was almost lynched several times. In 1958, the DP mayor of Zile declared martial law and mobilized the gendarmerie to prevent İnönü from conducting a rally in the city; a similar event happened in the city of Çankırı. In 1959, İnönü began a campaign tour that followed the same path he took thirty years ago as a Pasha from Uşak to İzmir and ended in victory for the Turkish nationalists. The DP minister of interior refused to promise protection to him. In Uşak, a crowd blocked İnönü from going to his podium, and he was hit in the head with a stone. Following his "Great Offensive," he flew to Istanbul, where he was almost lynched by a DP-organized mob on the way to Topkapı Palace. He was also banned from speaking in rallies in Kayseri and Yeşilhisar.

İnönü was banned from 12 sessions of parliament. This coincided with an authoritarian turn of the Democrat Party, which culminated in a military coup.

== Later life (1961–1973) ==
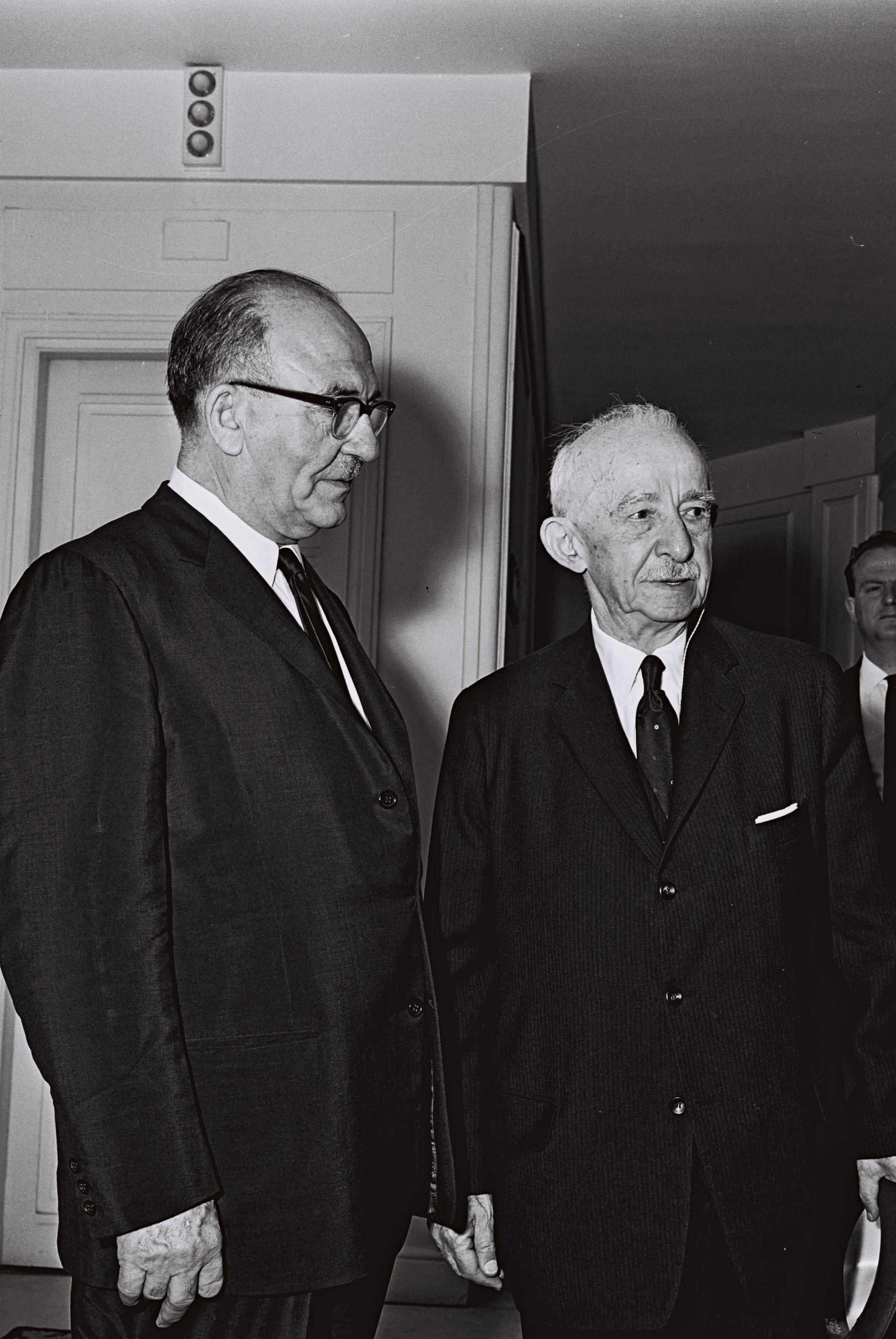
Prime Minister İnönü and Levi Eshkol, 1964

The Turkish Armed Forces overthrew the government as a result of the military coup on 27 May 1960. After one year of junta rule in which the Democrat Party was banned and its top leaders executed in the Yassıada Trials, elections were held once the military returned to their barracks. İnönü returned to power as Prime Minister after the 1961 election, in which the CHP won the election. Right-wing parties have since continuously attacked İnönü and the CHP for their perceived involvement in the hanging of Prime minister Menderes, even though İnönü advocated for Menderes' pardoning.

İnönü's governments were defined by an effort to deescalate tensions between radical forces in the Turkish army wishing for extended junta rule and former Democrats that wished for amnesty. İnönü's CHP did not gain enough seats in the legislature to win a majority in the elections, so in an effort to create reconciliation, he formed coalition governments with the neo-Democrat Justice Party the New Turkey Party and the Republican Villagers Nation Party until 1965. Forming coalitions with DP successor parties, however, provoked radical officers into action. Colonel Talât Aydemir twice attempted to overthrow the government in 1962 and 1963 Turkish coup attempts. Aydemir was later executed for conducting both coups. Aydemir's 1962 coup had the most potential to succeed when İnönü, President Cemal Gürsel and Chief of Staff Cevdet Sunay were held up in Çankaya Mansion by the putschists. Aydemir decided to let the group go, which foiled the coup.

While in coalition with the far-right Republican Villagers Nation Party, İnönü renounced the Greco-Turkish Treaty of Friendship of 1930 and took actions against the Greek minority. The Turkish government also strictly enforced a long-overlooked law barring Greek nationals from 30 professions and occupations; for example, Greeks could not be doctors, nurses, architects, shoemakers, tailors, plumbers, cabaret singers, ironsmiths, cooks, tourist guides, etc., and 50,000 more Greeks were deported. These actions were taken because of the growing anti-Greek sentiment in Turkey after the ethnic conflict in Cyprus flared up again. In a subsequent interview with İnönü concerning the expulsion of Greeks and the Turkish footballer of Greek descent Lefter Küçükandonyadis, İnönü stated: "I like Lefter, but I don't like Lefter's kind", referring to Greeks.

With an invasion of Cyprus imminent, American President Lyndon Johnson sent a memorandum to İnönü, effectively vetoing Turkish intervention. A subsequent meeting at the White House between İnönü and Johnson on 22 June 1964, meant Cyprus' status quo continued for another ten years. An event a couple years earlier also strained the otherwise amicable relationship İnönü held with Washington D.C., namely the withdrawal of the nuclear-armed PGM-19 Jupiter MRBMs briefly stationed in Turkey, which was undertaken in the aftermath of the Cuban Missile Crisis. While Washington withdrew the MRBMs, some B61 nuclear bombs are still stored in İncirlik Air Base.

İnönü's governments established the National Security Council, Turkish Statistical Institute, and Turkey's leading research institute, TÜBİTAK. Turkey signed the Ankara agreement, the first treaty of cooperation with the European Economic Community, and also strengthened ties with Iran and Pakistan. The army was modernized, and the National Intelligence Organization was founded. İnönü was instrumental in establishing CHP as "Left of Center" on the political spectrum as a new left-wing party cadre led by his protégé Bülent Ecevit became more influential. İnönü survived an assassination attempt from a Menderes supporter in 1964.

İnönü returned to the opposition after losing both the 1965 and 1969 general elections to a much younger man, Justice Party leader Süleyman Demirel. He remained leader of the CHP until 1972, when an interparty crisis over his endorsement of the 1971 military memorandum led to his defeat by Ecevit in the 5th extraordinary CHP convention. This was the first overthrow of a party leader in a leadership contest in the Republic's history. İnönü left his party and resigned his parliamentarianship afterward. Being a former president he was a member of the Senate in the last year of his life.

== Death ==
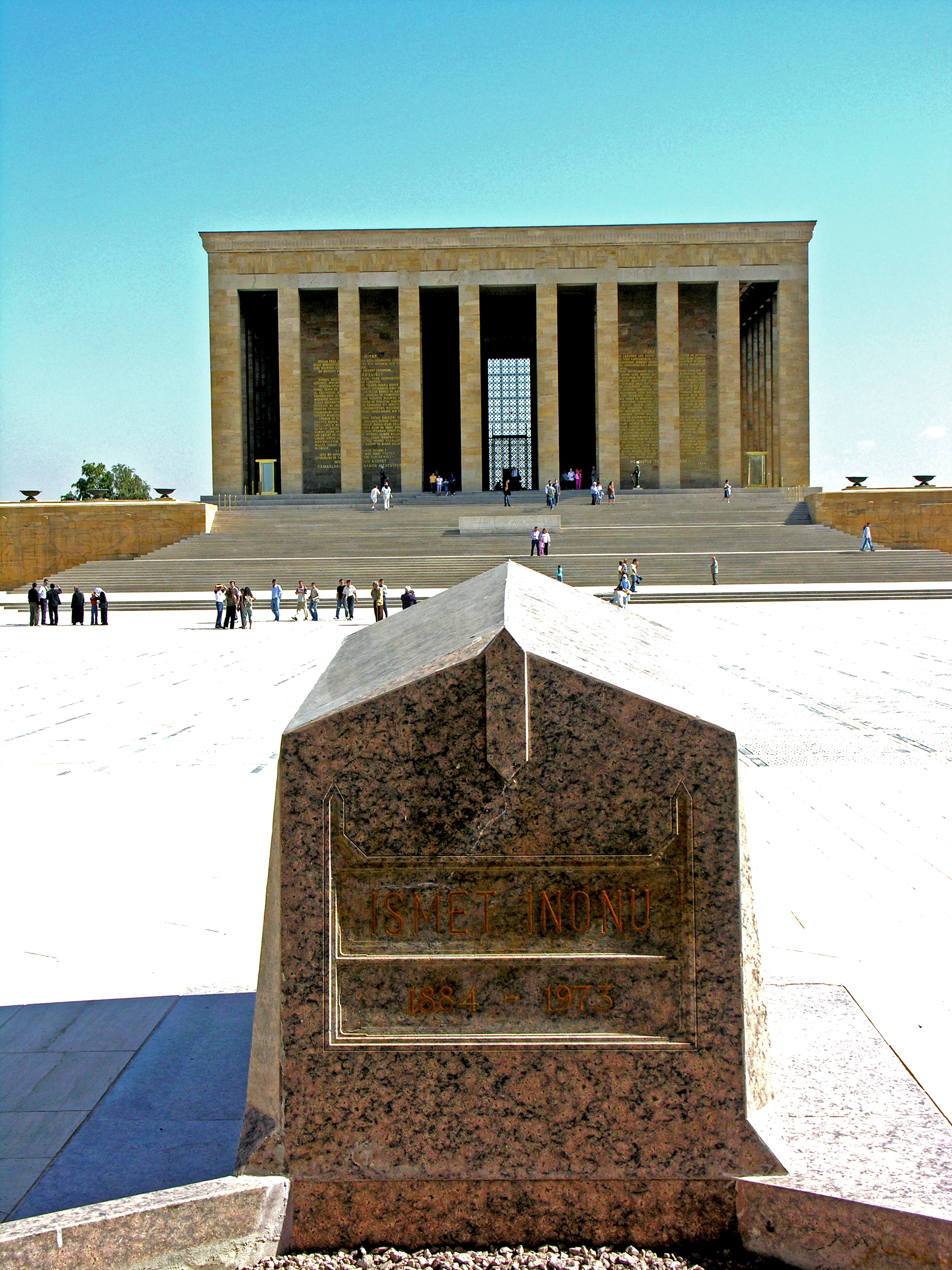
İnönü's tomb at Anıtkabir

On 25 December 1973, İsmet İnönü died of a heart attack at the age of 89. The parliament declared national mourning until his burial. He was interred at Anıtkabir opposite Atatürk's mausoleum, on 28 December. Following the 1980 coup, Kenan Evren transferred twelve graves from Anıtkabir, but kept İnönü's in place. İnönü's tomb took its present shape in January 1997.

== Personal life and family ==
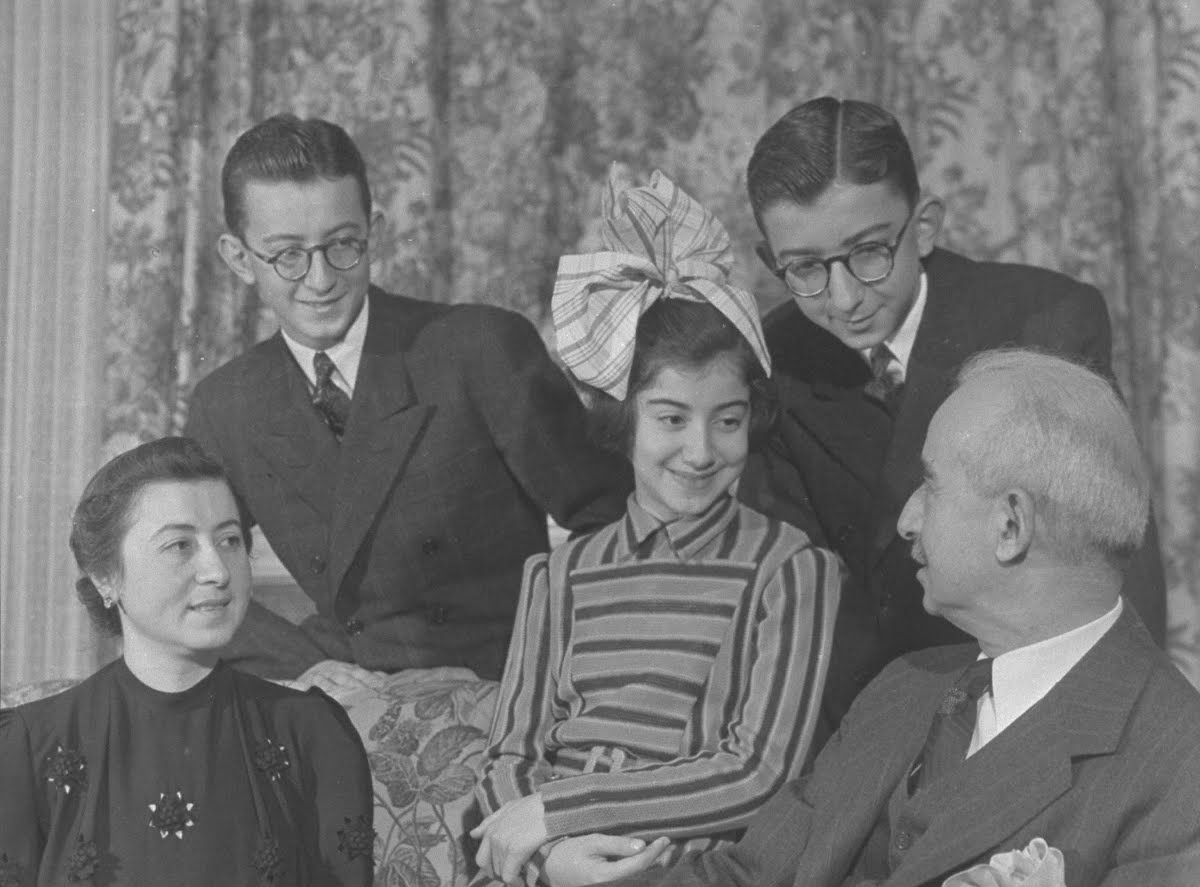
The İnönü family: Mevhibe, Ömer, Özden, Erdal, İsmet, early 1940s

A highly educated man, İnönü spoke fluent Arabic, English, French and German in addition to his native Turkish.

İnönü married Emine Mevhibe on 13 April 1916. They had four children: İzzet (1919–1921), Ömer (1924–2004), Erdal (1926–2007), and Özden (1930–). During the Greco-Turkish war, İnönü's infant son İzzet died before his victory in Sakarya and the news was only delivered to him in the spring of 1922. Mevhibe hid the news and the severity of his son's sickness due to the intensity of the war.

Ömer became a moderately successful businessman. His son Hayri served as mayor of Şişli, İstanbul from the CHP, 2014–2019.

Erdal İnönü was a scientist and theoretical physicist. He served as president of Middle East Technical University from 1970 to 1971. He entered politics after the 1980 coup d'état after the CHP was banned by the military junta of 1980. He founded the Social Democracy Party (SODEP) in 1983 and then the Social Democratic Populist Party (SHP). He served as a Deputy Prime Minister of Turkey from 1993 to 1995 and Minister of Foreign Affairs from March to October 1995. He merged the SHP with Deniz Baykal's refounded CHP in 1995.

Özden Toker is the head of the İnönü Foundation. She married Metin Toker, a famous Turkish writer and journalist who was repeatedly arrested by the DP government in the 50s. She contributed to the newspaper Akis in her husband's place while he was in prison. She continues to live in Ankara where she publishes, presents research, and organizes exhibitions and conferences related to the history of the Turkish Republic. Their daughter Ayşe Gülsün Bilgehan was a Deputy Leader of the CHP from 2010 to 2011 and a member of parliament in the 2000s and 2010s.

== Legacy ==
İnönü University and Malatya İnönü Stadium in Malatya are named after him, as is the İnönü Stadium in Istanbul, home of the Beşiktaş football club.

=== Portrayal ===
English-language portrayals of İnönü focus on his service in World War I as "Colonel İsmet Bey" during the Battle of Beersheba.

- Australian actor Gerard Kennedy played Colonel Ismet Bey in The Lighthorsemen (1987).
- Turkish actor Haluk Bilginer played Colonel Bey in the episode "Palestine, October 1917" of The Young Indiana Jones Chronicles, later re-released as "Daredevils of the Desert."

İsmet İnönü was portrayed by Savaş Dinçel in the series Kurtuluş (1994) and the film Cumhuriyet (1998); by Şemsi İnkaya in the series Ben Onu Çok Sevdim (2013–2014); and by Oğulcan Arman Uslu in the film Atatürk (2023).

=== Honours ===
==== National Honours ====
- Turkey: Medal of Independence, 21 November 1923

== See also ==
- Pembe Köşk – Private home from 1925 to 1973
- Çankaya Köşkü – The Presidency of the Republic of Turkey
- List of high-ranking commanders of the Turkish War of Independence

== Notes ==
Military offices
New title Office established	Chief of Turkish General Staff; 1920–1921	Succeeded by Fevzi Çakmak
Political offices
Preceded by Yusuf Kemal Tengirşenk	Minister of Foreign Affairs; 1922–1924	Succeeded by Şükrü Kaya
Preceded by Fethi Okyar	Prime Minister of Turkey; 1923–1924	Succeeded by Fethi Okyar
Preceded by Fethi Okyar	Prime Minister of Turkey; 1925–1937	Succeeded by Celâl Bayar
Preceded by Mustafa Kemal Atatürk	President of Turkey; 1938–1950	Succeeded by Celâl Bayar
Preceded by Emin Fahrettin Özdilek	Prime Minister of Turkey; 1961–1965	Succeeded by Suat Hayri Ürgüplü
Party political offices
Preceded by Mustafa Kemal Atatürk	Leader of the Republican People's Party; 1938–1972	Succeeded by Bülent Ecevit
