= People's Room =

The People's Rooms (Turkish: Halkodaları) were community centers established in rural Turkey beginning in 1939. The Turkish government established the People's Rooms to promote secular and Western cultural activities and to indoctrinate the residents in Kemalist state policies. By 1950, the number of People's Rooms was over 4,000.

The Republican People's Party (Turkish: Cumhuriyet Halk Partisi), or the CHP established the first People's Rooms in 1939. The CHP designed them to encourage secular social activities and to promote a sense of unity and nationalism.

The People's Rooms provided formal education, rural development and venues for cultural events. Even though the local populations tended to be conservative and religiously oriented, the People's Rooms were very successful. According to historians, they helped to unite most classes and societal divisions.
