= Orhan Şaik Gökyay =

Turkish writer (1891–1949)

- Born: 16 July 1902; İnebolu, Turkey
- Died: 2 December 1994 (aged 92)
- Occupations: Writer, teacher
- Writing career
- Language: Turkish
- Notable work: Bu Vatan Kimin?

Orhan Şaik Gökyay (born 16 July 1902, İnebolu – 2 December 1994) was a Turkish literature history and language researcher, poet, teacher.

== Biography ==
He was born on 16 July 1902 in İnebolu, where his father worked as a literature teacher. He is one of the seven children of a family that migrated from Plovdiv, Bulgaria to Anatolia after the Russo-Turkish War. His father was Mehmet Cevdet Efendi and his mother Şefika Hanım. His real name was Hüseyin Vehbi but he changed his name to "Orhan" in accordance with the circular issued during the period of Rıza Nur's ministry of national education on "every student takes a Turkish name".

== Bibliography ==
- Dede Korkut (İstanbul, 1938)
- Dedem Korkut'un Kitabı (İstanbul, 1973)
- Katip Çelebi'den Seçmeler (İstanbul, 1968)
- Destursuz Bağa Girenler (Dergâh Yayınları, İstanbul 1982)
- Bu Vatan Kimin? Şiirleri
