= John Dundas (Royal Navy officer) =

Royal Navy officer (1893–1952)

Vice-Admiral John Dundas CB CBE
- Born: John George Lawrence Dundas; 3 November 1893
- Died: 26 March 1952 (aged 58)
- Military career
- Allegiance: United Kingdom
- Branch: Royal Navy
- Rank: Vice-Admiral
- Commands: HMS Folkestone; HMS Nigeria
- Conflicts: World War I World War II

Vice-Admiral John George Lawrence Dundas, CB, CBE (3 November 1893 – 26 March 1952) was a Royal Navy officer who served as the Assistant Chief of the Naval Staff from 1944 to 1945.

== Biography ==
Born on 3 November 1893, Dundas was the son of the Hon. Cospatrick Thomas Dundas, DL, JP (1862–1906) and his wife Maud FitzWilliam (1871–1949), a daughter of the Hon. George Wentworth-FitzWilliam and a granddaughter of the 5th Earl FitzWilliam. Dundas's father was a grandson of the 1st Earl of Zetland and, when his elder brother inherited the earldom in 1873, Cospatrick was afforded the style of a peer's younger son. After his death in 1906, Maud remarried (in 1912) to the army officer and colonial administrator Major Sir Harry Edward Spiller Cordeaux.

Dundas entered the Royal Navy in 1907 as a cadet. He was commissioned as a full Sub-Lieutenant in December 1914 and promoted to Lieutenant a year later. During the First World War, Dundas served in torpedo boats and in HMS Hercules. Promoted to Lieutenant-Commander in December 1923, He completed training at the Naval Staff College in 1924 and served as the gunnery officer for the 2nd Cruiser Squadron. In 1928, he was promoted to Commander. Between 1930 and 1932, he was gunnery officer to the Mediterranean Fleet; after serving on Valiant, he attended staff training at Camberley in 1935 and was promoted to captain. In 1936, he studied at the Imperial Defence College. He commanded the sloop Folkestone in 1936–1937 and in 1938 was appointed assistant director of Plans at the Admiralty. Several months into the Second World War, he was given command of the light cruiser Nigeria (1940–1942), and was involved in escorting the Russian convoys. He created a new manoeuvre called the "Dundas zig-zag".

Dundas was chief of staff to the Commander-in-Chief of the Mediterranean Fleet from 1942 to 1943, when was appointed chief of staff, Levant. Promoted to rear-admiral in 1944, he was assistant chief of the Naval Staff from 1944 to 1945. He retired in 1946 and afforded the rank of vice-admiral in 1948. He died on 26 March 1952.

== Citations ==
=== Bibliography ===
- Halpern, Paul G., ed. (2016). The Mediterranean Fleet, 1930–1939. Publications of the Navy Records Society. Vol. 163. London: Routledge for the Navy Records Society. ISBN 978-1-4724-7597-8.
