= 1980 in Turkey =

- Centuries: 20th; 21st
- Decades: 1960s; 1970s; 1980s; 1990s; 2000s
- See also: List of years in Turkey

Events in the year 1980 in Turkey.

== Parliament ==
- 16th Parliament of Turkey (up to 12 September)

== Incumbents ==
- President –

Fahri Korutürk (up to 6 April)
İhsan Sabri Çağlayangil (acting, 6 April – 12 September)
Kenan Evren (from 12 September)

- Prime Minister –

Süleyman Demirel (up to 12 September)
Bülent Ulusu (from 20 September)

- Leader of the opposition –

Bülent Ecevit (up to 12 September)

== Ruling party and the main opposition ==
- Ruling party

Justice Party (AP) (up to 12 September)

- Main opposition

Republican People's Party (CHP) (up to 12 September)

== Cabinet ==
- 43rd government of Turkey (up to 12 September)
- 44th government of Turkey (from 21 September)

== Events ==
=== January ===
- 2 January – Military leaders issue a warning letter about terrorism.

=== February ===
- 2 February – DİSK initiates a general strike.

=== April ===
- 18 April – Turkey signs a nuclear nonproliferation accord.

=== May ===
- 25 May – Trabzonspor wins the championship

=== July ===
- 1 July – Turkey signs an association agreement with the European Community.
- 19 July – Former Premier Nihat Erim killed by terrorists.

=== August ===
- 5 August – Hazal by Ali Özgentürk wins the Grand Prix in France.
- 6 August – Armenian terrorists attack the Turkish Consulate in Lyon.

=== September ===
- 12 September – 1980 Turkish coup d'état.
- Following the military coup of 1980, the Kurdish language was officially prohibited in public and private life. Many people who spoke, published, or sang in Kurdish were arrested and imprisoned.

=== October ===
- 11 October – Census (Population: 44,736,947)
- 15 October – NSP chairman Erbakan and 21 party members arrested for acting against secular principles of the republic.
- 27 October – Work begins on a new constitution.
- 30 October – Bülent Ecevit resigns from CHP for its passivity during the coup.

== Births ==
- 1 January – Nurcan Çelik, footballer (d. 2026)
- 4 February – Gündüz Gürol Azer, footballer
- 7 March – Murat Boz, singer and actor
- 12 April – Arda Kural, actor
- 16 June – Nehir Erdoğan, actress
- 29 September – Ümit Şamiloğlu, artistic gymnast
- 14 October – Cansu Dere, actress

== Deaths ==
- 11 April – Ümit Kaftancıoğlu (born 1935), TV producer (assassinated)
- 18 May – Gündüz Kılıç (born 1918), football coach
- 21 June – Feridun Cemal Erkin (born 1899), diplomat and politician
- 19 July – Nihat Erim (born 1912), former prime minister (33rd and 34th government of Turkey, assassinated)
- 22 July – Kemal Türkler (born 1926), trade union leader (assassinated)
- 27 June – Ahmet Muhip Dıranas (born 1909), poet and author
- 30 November – Orhan Eyüpoğlu (born 1918), politician

== Gallery ==
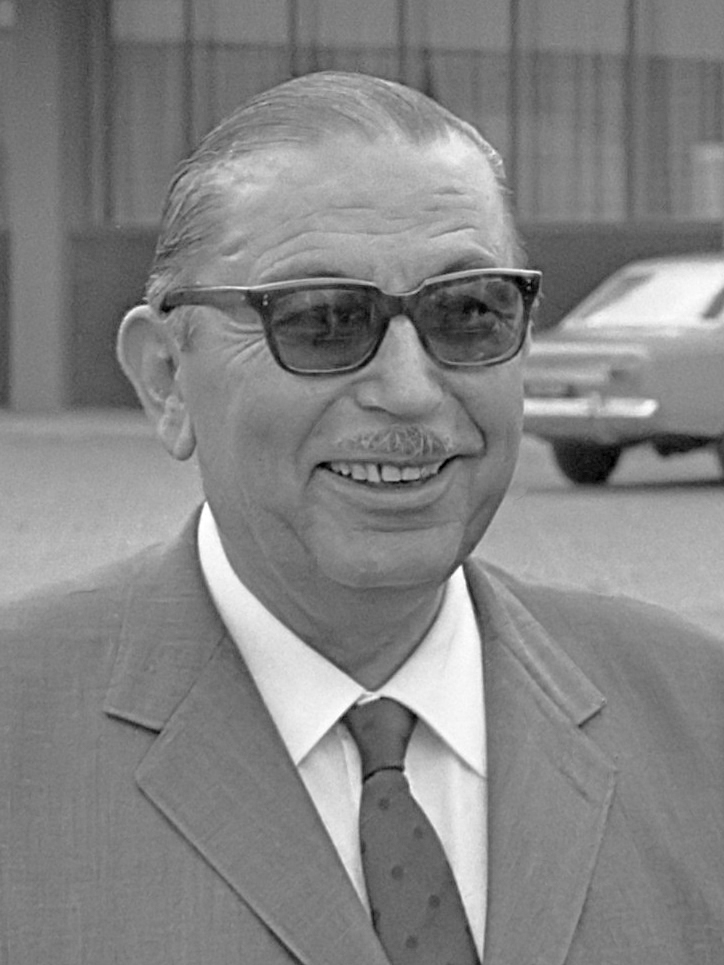
İhsan Sabri Çağlayangil

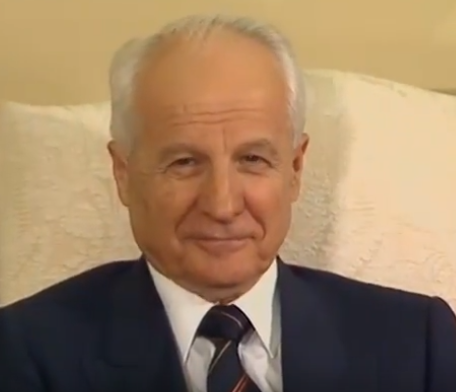
Kenan Evren

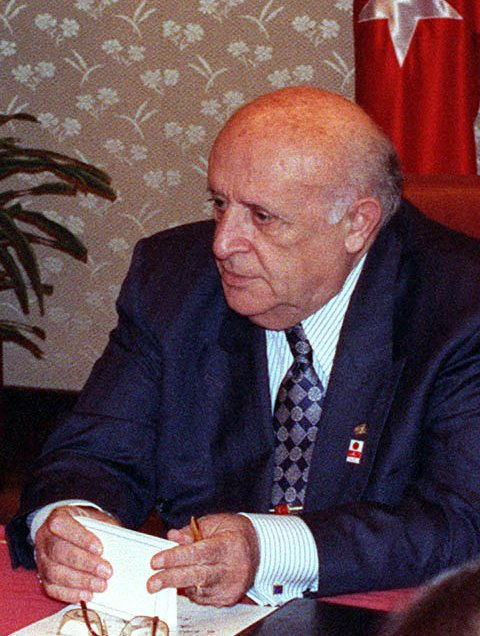
Süleyman Demirel

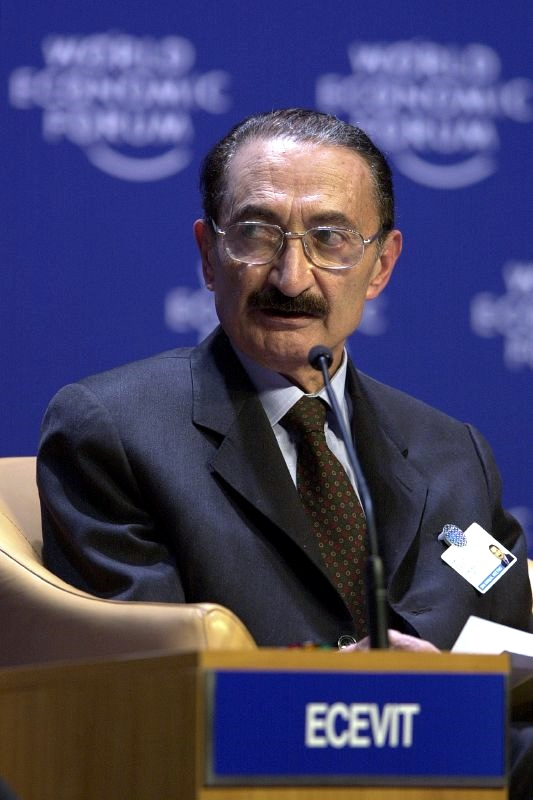
Bülent Ecevit

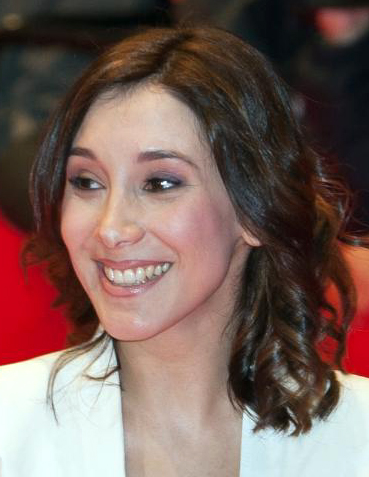
Sibel Kekilli

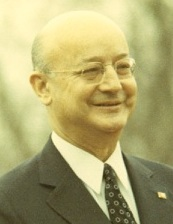
Nihat Erim

== See also ==
- Turkey in the Eurovision Song Contest 1980
- 1979–80 1.Lig
