= 1982 in Turkey =

- Centuries: 20th; 21st
- Decades: 1960s; 1970s; 1980s; 1990s; 2000s
- See also: List of years in Turkey

Events in the year 1982 in Turkey.

== Incumbents ==
- President – Kenan Evren
- Prime Minister – Bülent Ulusu

== Ruling party ==
- Ruling party – (Technocrat government)

== Cabinet ==
- 44th government of Turkey

== Events ==
=== January ===
- 9 January – The flow direction of sea traffic in Bosporus was changed from left to right.
- 28 January – Turkish diplomat Kemal Arıkan assassinated by Armenian terrorists in Los Angeles.

=== April ===
- 8 April – Romanian–Turkish Economic Cooperation protocol signed.
- 10 April – Bülent Ecevit arrested for an article he wrote.
- 23 April The national broadcaster TRT broadcasts in color.
- 26 April – Second arrest of Ecevit, for a letter he wrote to a journalist.

=== May ===
- 4 May – Turkish diplomatic Orhan Gündüz was assassinated by Armenian terrorists in Boston.

=== June ===
- 2 June – Ecevit is acquitted of all charges relating to 10 April arrest.
- 7 June – Turkish diplomatic Erkut Akbay and his wife Nadide Akbay assassinated by Armenian terrorists in Lisbon.
- 13 June – Beşiktaş wins the championship

=== July ===
- 23 July – Turkey and Greece sign an accord.

=== August ===
- 4 August – NSC lifts some of the restrictions on political expression.
- 7 August – Armenian terrorists kill eight civilians in the Esenboğa International Airport attack.
- 27 August – Turkish diplomat Atilla Altıkat assassinated by Armenian terrorists in Ottawa.

=== September ===
- 9 September – Turkish diplomat in Bulgaria Bora Süelkan assassinated by Armenian terrorists in Burgas.

=== October ===
- 15 October – Turkish novelist Yaşar Kemal wins the Prix mondial Cino Del Duca.

=== November ===
- 7 November: 91 percent approve the new constitution in a national referendum.
- 16 November: Prime Minister Bülend Ulusu and Soviet prime minister Nikolai Tikhonov meet in Moscow.
- 29 November: Turkey and United States plan improvements to ten airfields in Turkey.

=== December ===
- 15 December: Turkey and China sign an economic accord.

== Births ==
- 16 January – Tuncay, footballer
- 4 March – Yasemin Mori, singer
- 12 August – Meryem Uzerli, actress
- 26 August – Gamze Özçelik, model and TV artist
- 11 September – Elvan Abeylegesse, track athlete
- 2 October – Esra Gümüş, volleyball player
- 2 November – Serkan Yalçın, footballer
- 8 December – Halil Altıntop and Hamit Altıntop, footballers

== Deaths ==
- 28 January – Kemal Arıkan, consul (assassinated)
- 9 April – Turan Güneş (born 1922), politician
- 4 May – Orhan Gündüz, consul (assassinated)
- 22 May – Cevdet Sunay (born 1899), army general and politician
- 27 August – Atilla Altıkat (born 1937), military attaché (assassinated)
- 4 November – Burhan Felek (born 1899), journalist

== Gallery ==
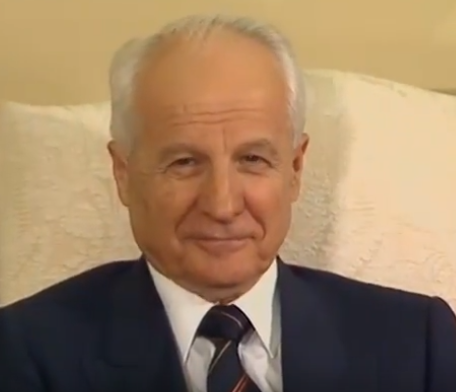
Kenan Evren

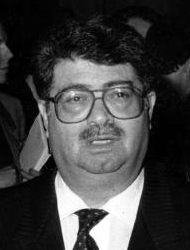
Turgut Özal

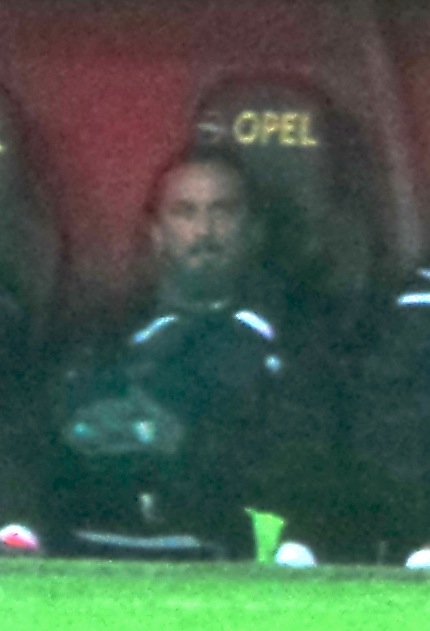
Tuncay

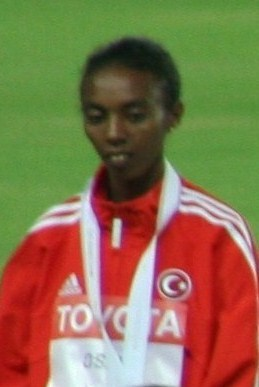
Elvan Abeylegesse

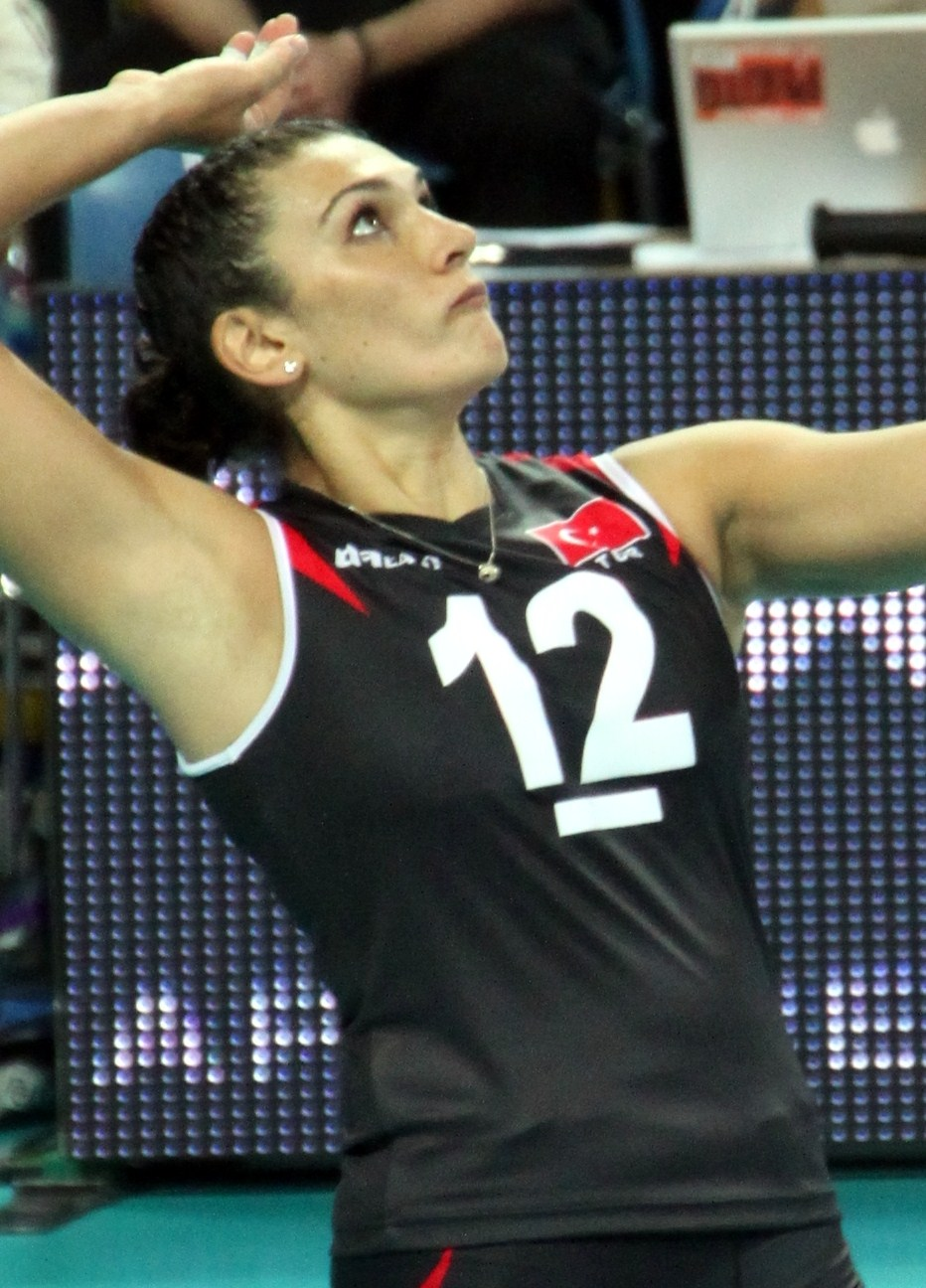
Esra Gümüş

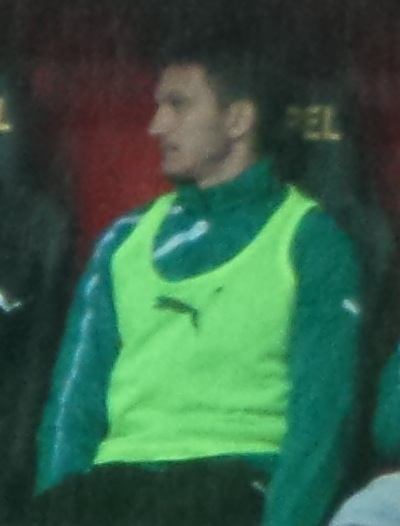
Serkan Yalçın

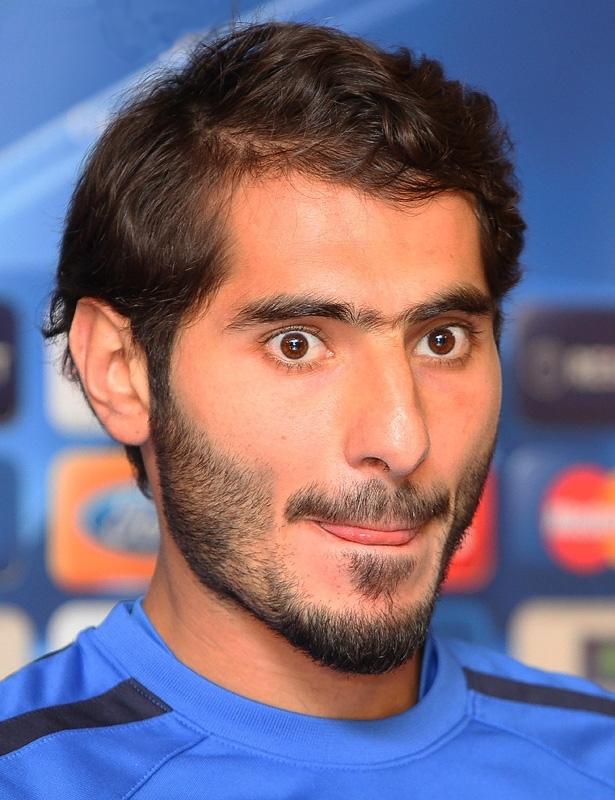
Halil Altıntop

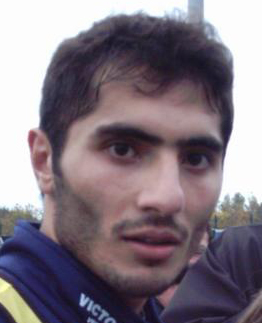
Hamit Altıntop

== See also ==
- Turkey in the Eurovision Song Contest 1982
- 1981–82 1.Lig
