= 1984 in Turkey =

- Centuries: 20th; 21st
- Decades: 1960s; 1970s; 1980s; 1990s; 2000s
- See also: List of years in Turkey

These are the following events which occurred in the year 1984 in Turkey.

== Parliament ==
- 17th Parliament of Turkey

== Incumbents ==
- President – Kenan Evren
- Prime Minister – Turgut Özal
- Leader of the opposition – Necdet Calp

== Ruling party and the main opposition ==
- Ruling party – Motherland Party (ANAP)
- Main opposition – People’s Party (HP)

== Cabinet ==
- 45th government of Turkey (from 21 September)

== Events ==
=== February ===
- 18 February – Nazlı Deniz Kuruoğlu wins Miss Europe.

=== March ===
- 13 March – President Li Xiannian of China visits Turkey.

=== May ===
- 1 May – The first issue of weekly magazine Yeni Gündem appears
- 2 May – Turkey and West Germany sign a nuclear energy agreement.
- 9 May – Novelist Yaşar Kemal wins Légion d'honneur.
- 17 May – Trabzonspor wins the championship

=== June ===
- 20 June – Turkey diplomat Erdoğan Özen assassinated by Armenian terrorists in Vienna.

=== November ===
- 11 November – Melek Gürkan wins Miss Asia Pacific International.
- 19 November – Turkish diplomat Enver Ergun was assassinated by Armenian terrorists in Vienna.
- 25 November – Professor Muzaffer Aksoy shares the Ramazzini award with Prof. Enrico C. Vigliani.

=== December ===
- 25 December – Soviet premier Nikolai Tikhonov arrives in Ankara for official visit.

== Births ==
- 9 February – Şebnem Schaefer, model
- 19 February – Onur Tuncer, footballer
- 26 February – Beren Saat, actress
- 1 March – İbrahim Şahin, footballer
- 4 April – Selin Ciğerci, social media influencer
- 31 July – İpek Yaylacıoğlu, actress and photographer
- 13 August – Ayça Naz İhtiyaroğlu, volleyball player
- 25 August – Kenan Sofuoğlu, motorcycle racer
- 2 November – Berrak Tüzünataç, actress
- 18 November – Melikshah Soyturk, modern Turkish topographic painter
- 10 December – Şenol Akın, footballer

== Deaths ==
- 14 January – Fazıl Küçük (born in 1906) former leader of the Turkish Cypriots
- 25 February – Hasan Hüseyin Korkmazgil (born in 1927), folk poet
- 19 March – Kerime Nadir (born in 1917), writer
- 28 September – Cihat Baban (born in 1911), former government minister
- 4 October - Muazzez Tahsin Berkand (born in 1899), writer
- 4 November – Ümit Yaşar Oğuzcan (born in 1926), poet
- 8 December – Semih Sancar (born in 1911), former chief of staff

== Gallery ==
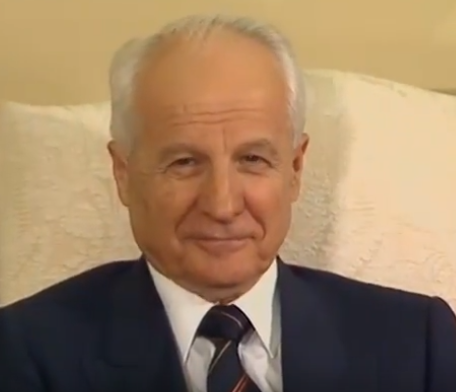
Kenan Evren

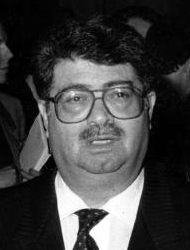
Turgut Özal

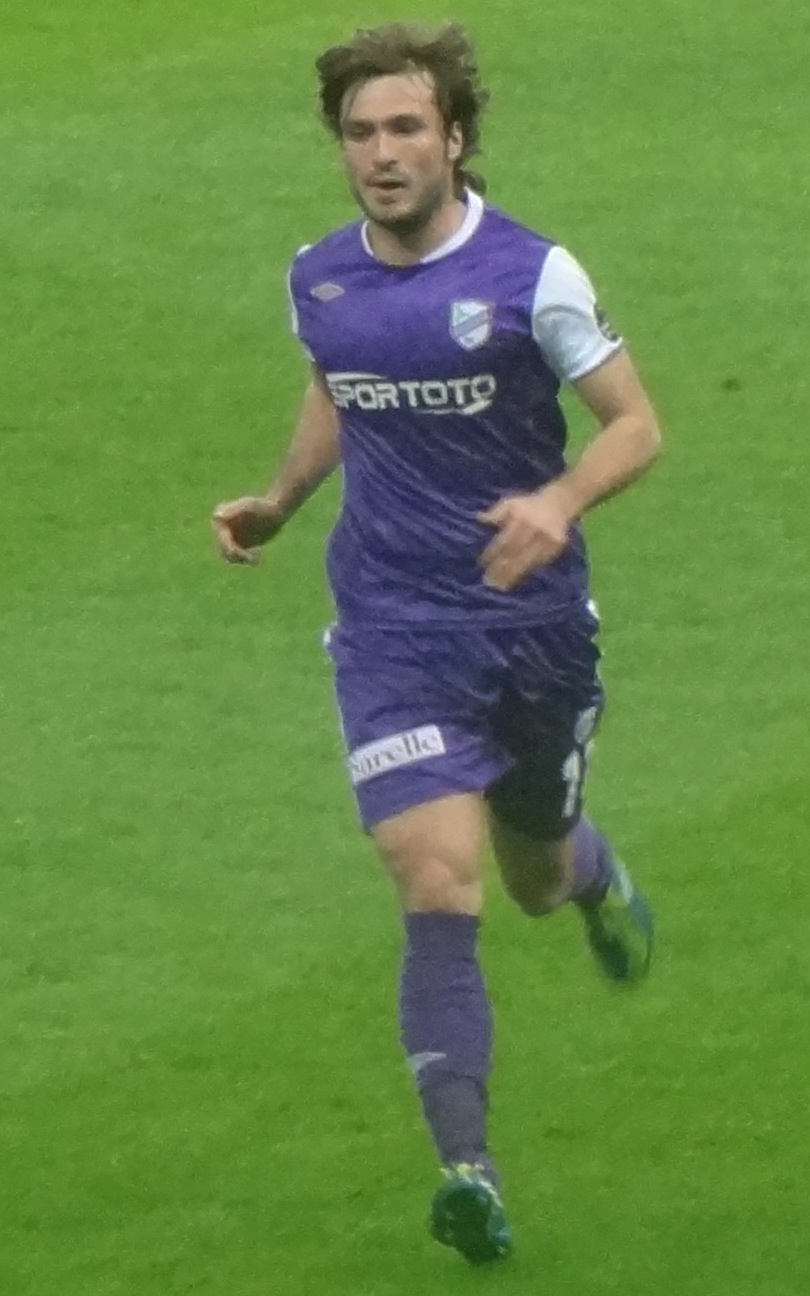
Onur Tuncer

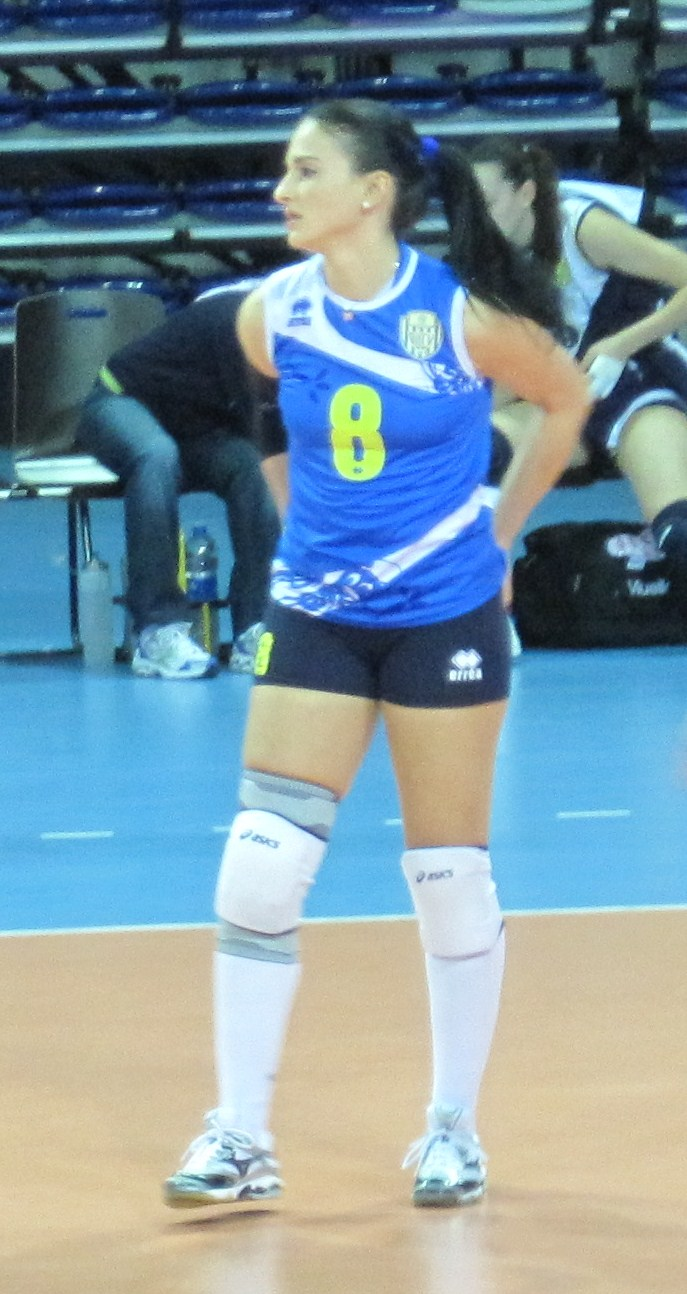
Ayça Naz İhtiyaroğlu

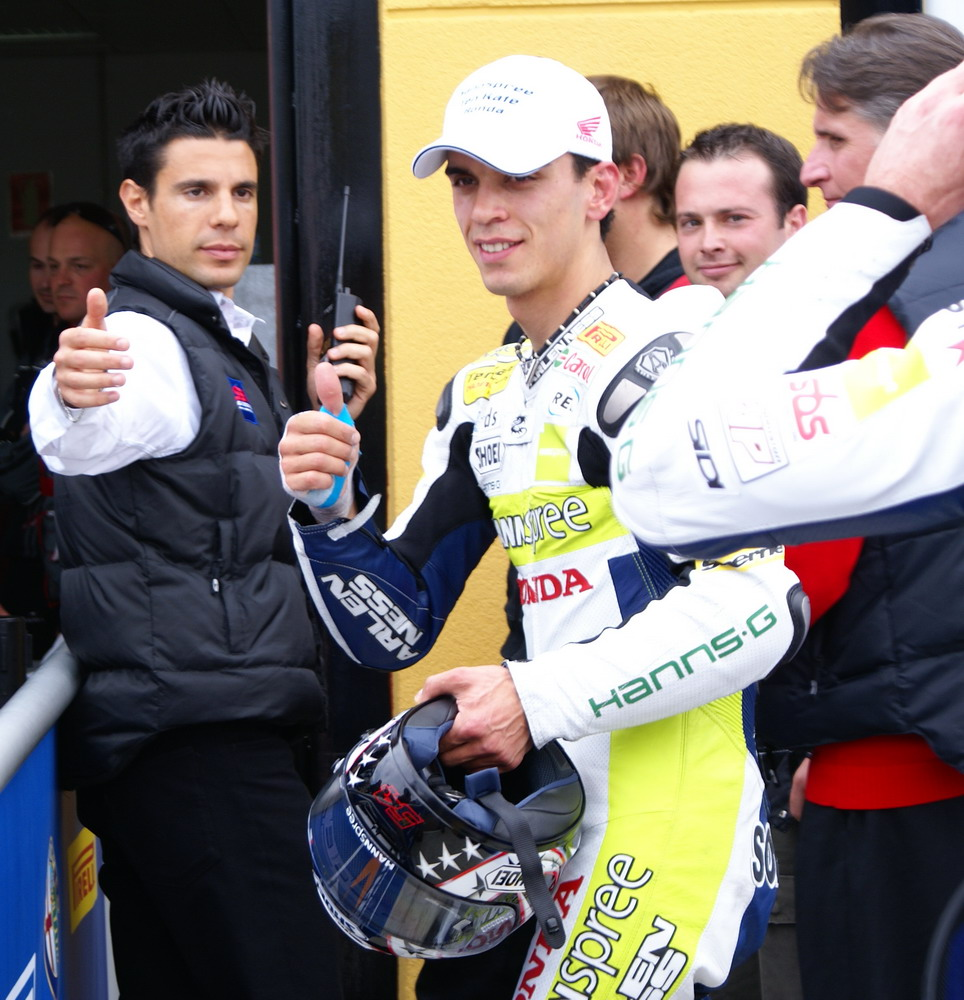
Kenan Sofuoğlu

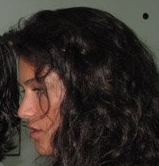
Berrak Tüzünataç

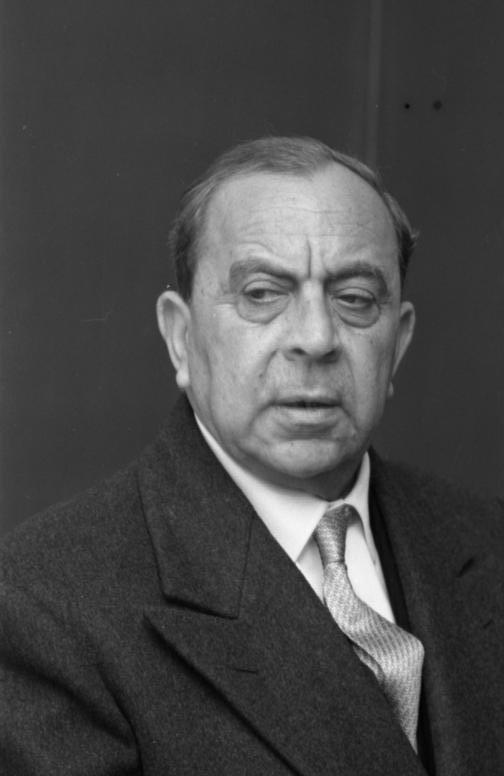
Fazıl Küçük

== See also ==
- Turkey in the Eurovision Song Contest 1984
- 1983–84 1.Lig
- Turkey at the 1984 Summer Olympics
- Turkey at the 1984 Winter Olympics
