= 1981 in Turkey =

- Centuries: 20th; 21st
- Decades: 1960s; 1970s; 1980s; 1990s; 2000s
- See also: List of years in Turkey

Events in the year 1981 in Turkey.

== Incumbents ==
- President – Kenan Evren
- Prime Minister – Bülent Ulusu

== Ruling party and the main opposition ==
- Ruling party – (Technocrat government)

== Cabinet ==
- 44th government of Turkey

== Events ==
=== January ===
- 17 January – Cargo ship Deniz Sönmez sinks near Crete, resulting in 32 fatalities.

=== March ===
- 4 March – Two Turkish diplomats assassinated by Armenian terrorists.

=== May ===
- 13 May – Assassination attempt on John Paul II by Mehmet Ali Ağca
- 24 May – Trabzonspor won the championship of the Turkish football league

=== July ===
- 27 July – Turkey elects state artists for the first time.

=== October ===
- 16 October – NSC dissolves all political parties.
- 23 October – Consultative Assembly inaugurated.

=== November ===
- 3 November – 3 November – Former prime minister Bülent Ecevit receives prison sentence for making political statements.
- 30 November – Ministry of Culture merges with the Ministry of Tourism.

== Births ==
- 10 January – Mert Fırat, actor
- 17 February – Songül Öden
- 34 March – Aysun Kayacı, model
- 27 October – Volkan Demirel, footballer
- 20 November – İbrahim Toraman, footballer

== Deaths ==
- 4 March – Reşat Moralı and Tecelli Arı (assassinated)
- 18 March – Cahide Sonku (born in 1919), artist
- 27 April – Münir Nurettin Selçuk, singer
- 18 May – Fuat Sirmen (born in 1899), former speaker of the parliament
- 26 December – Suat Hayri Ürgüplü (born in 1903), former prime minister (29th government of Turkey)

== Gallery ==
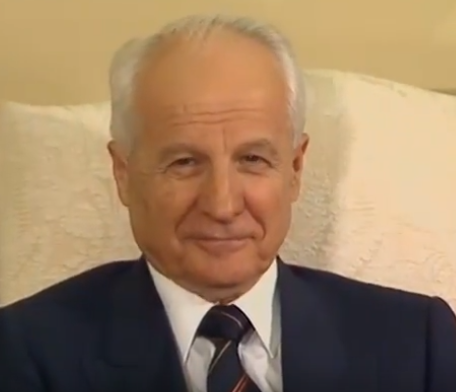
Kenan Evren

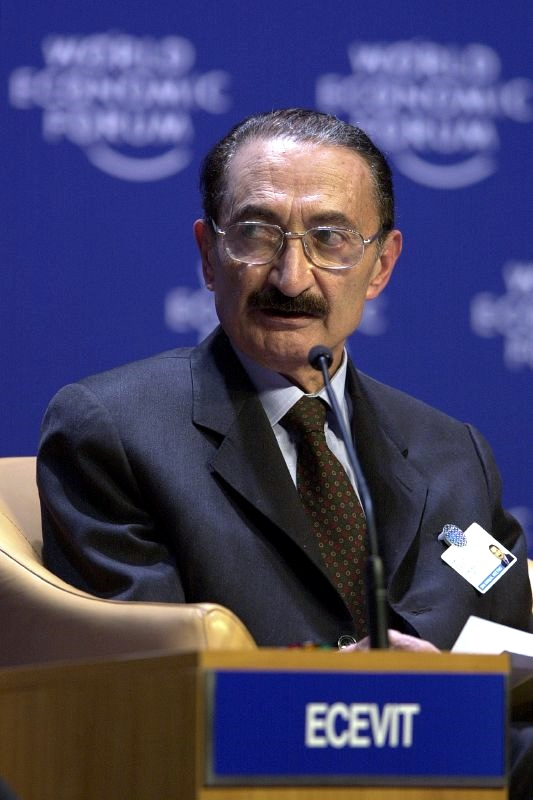
Bülent Ecevit

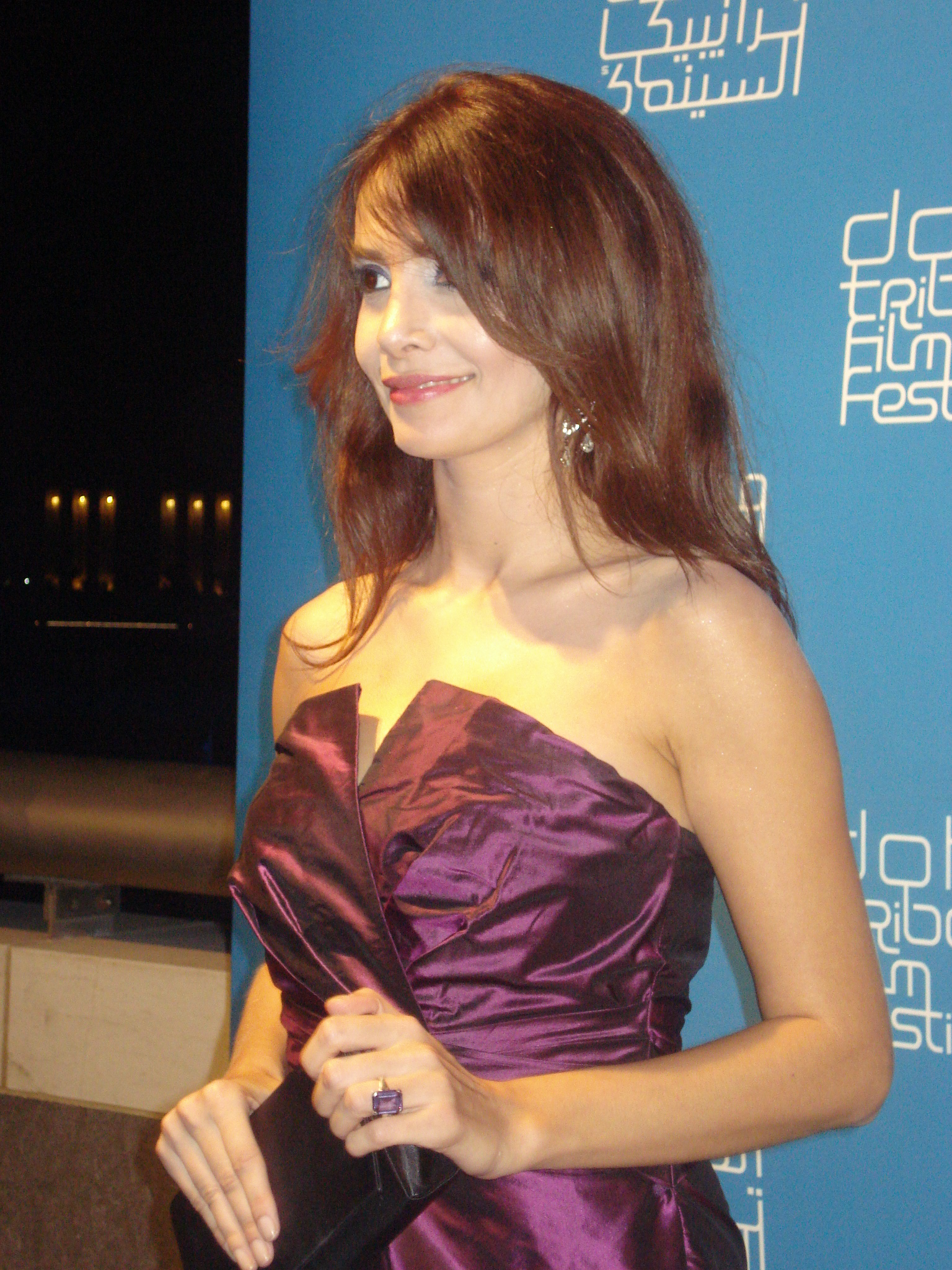
Songül Öden

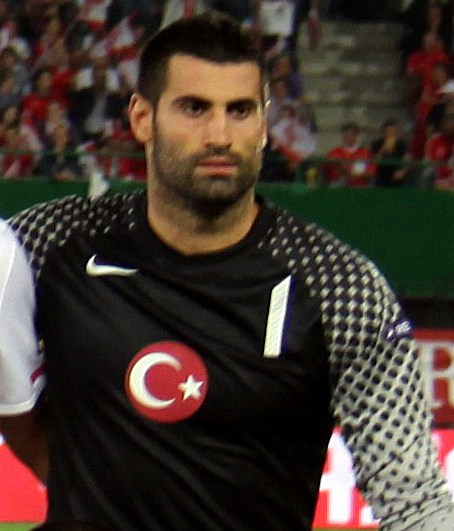
Volkan Demirel

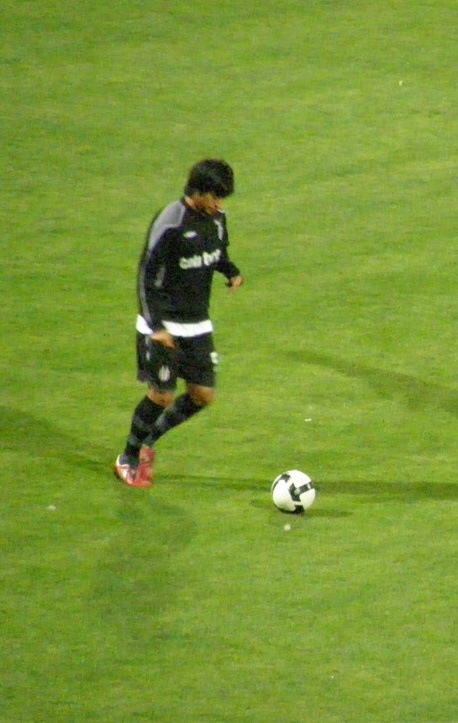
İbrahim Toraman

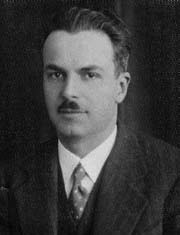
Fuat Sirmen

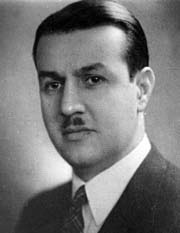
Suat Hayri Ürgüplü

== See also ==
- 1980–81 1.Lig
- Turkey in the Eurovision Song Contest 1981
