= 1983 in Turkey =

- Centuries: 20th; 21st
- Decades: 1960s; 1970s; 1980s; 1990s; 2000s
- See also: List of years in Turkey

Events in the year 1983 in Turkey.

== Parliament ==
- 17th Parliament of Turkey (from 6 November)

== Incumbents ==
- President – Kenan Evren
- Prime Minister –

Bülent Ulusu (up to 13 December)
Turgut Özal (from 13 December)

- Leader of the opposition – Necdet Calp (from 13 December)

== Ruling party and the main opposition ==
- Ruling party

(Technocrat government) (up to 13 December)
Motherland Party (ANAP) (from 13 December)

- Main opposition – People’s Party (HP) (from 13 December)

== Cabinet ==
44th government of Turkey (up to 13 December)
45th government of Turkey (from 13 December)

== Events ==
=== January ===
- 16 January – Turkish Airlines Flight 158, catches fire, resulting in 45 deaths.
- 28 January – Parliamentary Assembly of Council of Europe considers expulsion of Turkey because of alleged human rights violations.

=== March ===
- 2 March – Free trade zones created in Aliağa, Antalya and Yumurtalık.
- 7 March – Mining accident in Zonguldak results in 79 deaths.
- 9 March – Turkish diplomat Galip Balkar was assassinated by Armenian terrorists.

=== April ===
- 24 April – Ban on political activities lifted.

=== May ===
- 4 May – Doğu Perinçek is sentenced to 12 years in prison.
- 16 May – Nationalist Democracy Party founded.
- 19 May – Populist Party formed.
- 20 May – Turgut Özal forms Motherland Party.
- 20 May – Great Turkey Party founded.
- 26 May – Social Democracy Party (SODEP) was founded
- 29 May – Professor Erdal İnönü founds Social Democracy Party.
- 31 May – Military administration closes down Grand the Turkey Party.

=== June ===
- 1 June – BTP closed by the military rulers. Süleyman Demirel, former prime minister as well as other politicians of the former Justice Party and Republican People's Party were arrested
- 23 June – True Path Party founded.

=== July ===
- 5 July – 1983 Biga earthquake
- 7 July – National Security Council vetoes 30 founders of True Path Party.
- 14 July – Turkish diplomat Dursun Aksoy assassinated by Armenian terrorists.
- 15 July – Armenian terrorists bomb the Turkish Airlines check-in counter in Paris, resulting in 7 deaths.

=== August ===
- 24 August – Motherland Party receives permission to participate in 6 November elections.
- 24 August – TPP and SDP are disqualified from taking part in the elections.

=== October ===
- 30 October 1983 Erzurum earthquake with the moment magnitude of 6.6 results in 1,342 deaths.

=== November ===
- 2 November – First successful kidney transplantation in Istanbul.
- 6 November – MP wins elections by majority.
- 15 November – Turkey recognizes Northern Cyprus.

=== December ===
- 13 December – First civilian government after the coup of 1980.
- 18 December – Erdal İnönü replaces Cezmi Kartay as the chairman of SODEP.

== Births ==
- 16 June – Naz Elmas, actress
- 29 August – Saadet Aksoy, actress
- 10 October – Tolga Zengin, footballer
- 29 October – Nurcan Taylan, weight lifter
- 9 December – Neslihan Demir volleyball player

== Deaths ==
- 8 January – Hüseyin Alp (born 1935), basketball player
- 19 January – Muhittin Taylan, (born 1910) chief of constitutional court and one time candidate of presidency
- 9 March – Galip Balkar (born 1836), ambassador (assassinated)
- 24 May – Necip Fazıl Kısakürek (born 1904), poet
- 28 May – Çiğdem Talu (born 1939), music lyricist
- 2 September – Feri Cansel (born 1944), actress (killed)
- 10 October – Salise Abanozoğlu (born 1904), teacher and politician
- 9 November – Rüştü Erdelhun (born 1894), army general

== Gallery ==
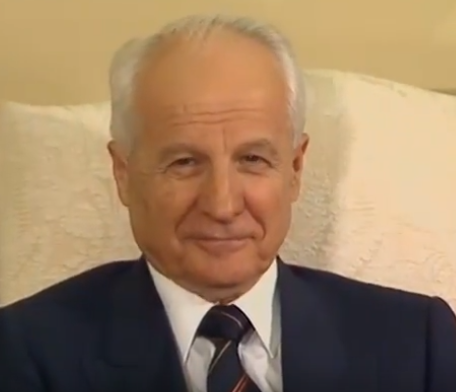
Kenan Evren

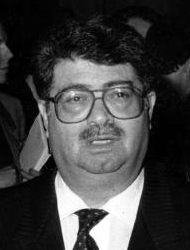
Turgut Özal

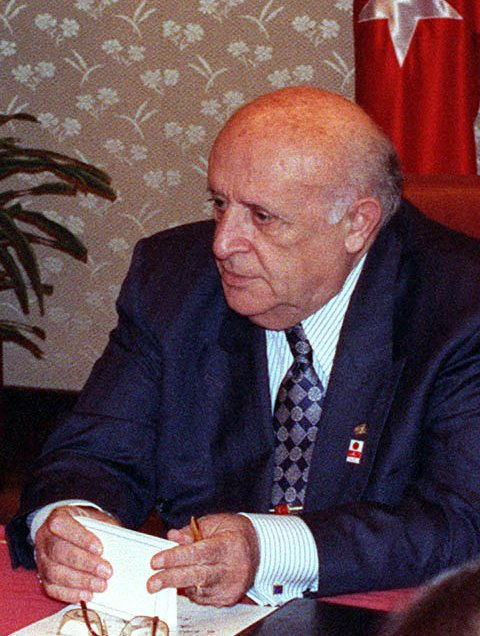
Süleyman Demirel

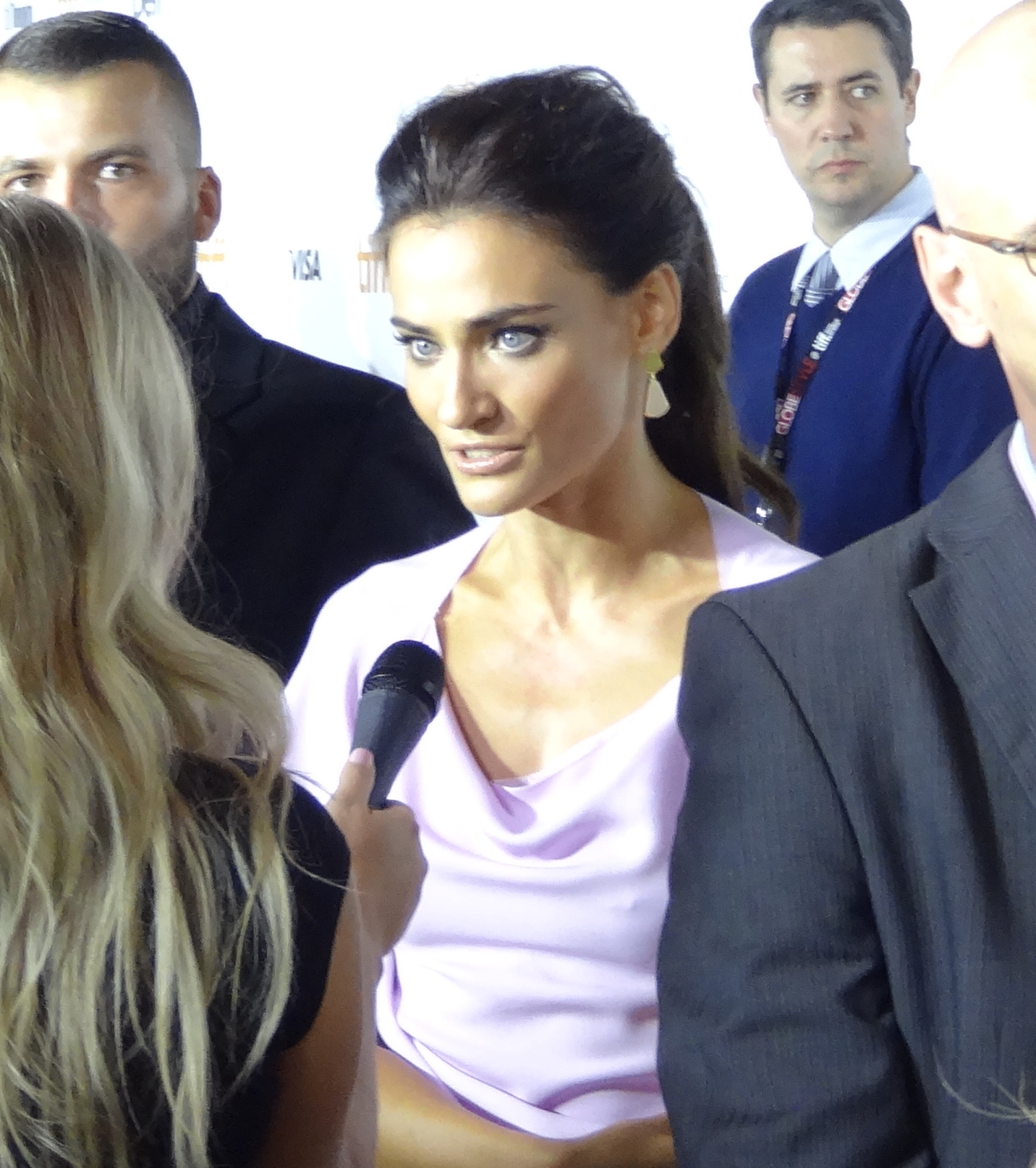
Saadet Aksoy

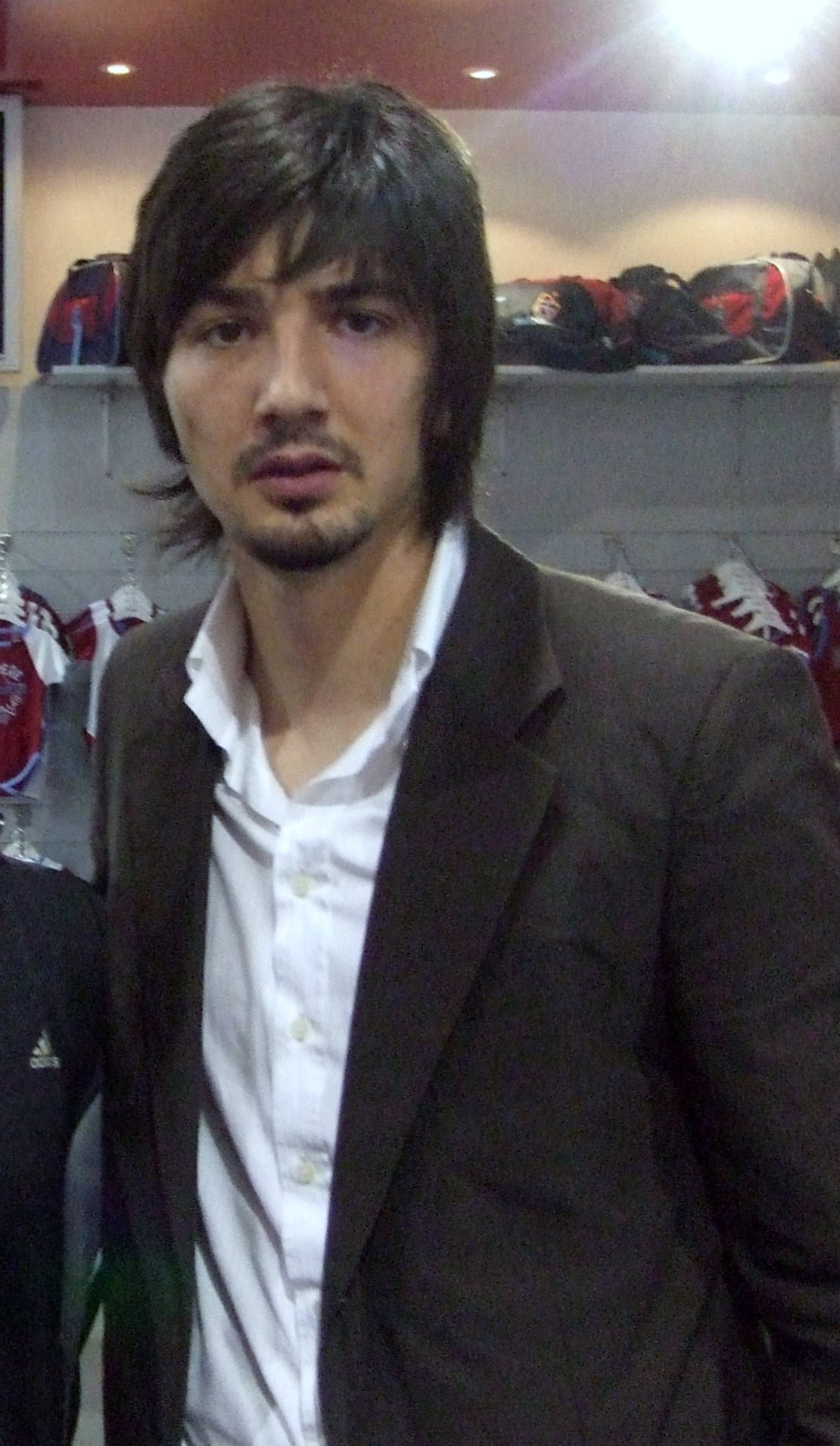
Tolga Zengin

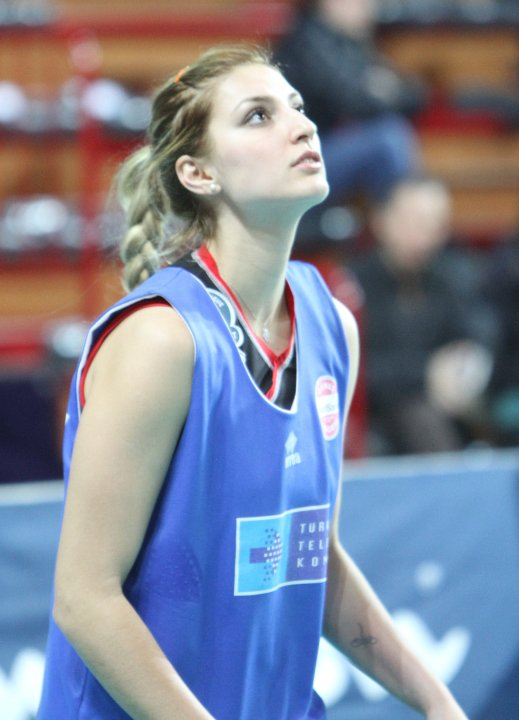
Neslihan Demir

== See also ==
- Turkey in the Eurovision Song Contest 1983
- 1982–83 1.Lig
