= 1979 in Turkey =

- Centuries: 20th; 21st
- Decades: 1950s; 1960s; 1970s; 1980s; 1990s
- See also: List of years in Turkey

Events in the year 1979 in Turkey.

== Parliament ==
- 16th Parliament of Turkey

== Incumbents ==
- President – Fahri Korutürk
- Prime Minister –

Bülent Ecevit (up to 12 November)
Süleyman Demirel (from 12 November)

- Leader of the opposition –

Süleyman Demirel (up to 12 November)
Bülent Ecevit (from 12 November)

== Ruling party and the main opposition ==
- Ruling party

Republican People's Party (CHP) (up to 12 November)
Justice Party (AP) (from 12 November)

- Main opposition

Justice Party (AP) (up to 12 November)
Republican People's Party (CHP) (from 12 November)

== Cabinet ==
- 42nd government of Turkey (up to 12 November)
- 43rd government of Turkey (from 12 November)

== Events ==
=== February ===
- 1 February 1979 – Abdi İpekçi is assassinated.

=== March ===
- 3 March – Sürü wins Best Film in the 30th Berlin International Film Festival.
- 15 March – Turkey withdraws from CENTO.
- 29 March – U.S. Congress approves $200,000,000 in military aid.

=== April ===
- 12 April – U.S. serviceman killed in İzmir.

=== May ===
- 24 May – First local airplane in Kayseri is operational.

=== June ===
- 3 June – Trabzonspor wins the championship.
- 15 June – Turkish and Greek officials commence talks on Cyprus

=== July ===
- 10 July – Mehmet Ali Ağca, charged with the murder of Abdi İpekçi, is arrested.
- 13 July – A Palestinian group raids the Egyptian Embassy in Ankara.

=== August ===
- 8 August – Students at the opening ceremony of Middle East Technical University sing The Internationale instead of the Turkish national anthem.

=== October ===
- 5 October – A permanent Palestine Liberation Organization office opens in Ankara.
- 14 October – The ruling party CHP is defeated in the general election.

=== November ===
- 20 November – Deputy dean of Istanbul University, Ümit Doğanay, is killed by terrorists.
- 25 November – Mehmet Ali Ağca escapes from prison.

== Births ==
- 1 January – Ibrahim Benli, Danish politician
- 15 April – Nezihe Kalkan (Nez), singer
- 23 April – Bengü Erden (Bengü) singer
- 2 May – Yasemin Dalkılıç, female free diver
- 29 June – Barış Akarsu, singer (died in 2007)

== Deaths ==
- 1 February – Abdi İpekçi (assassinated at age 49), journalist
- 29 April – Muhsin Ertuğrul (aged 54), theatre actor
- 16 June – Ayhan Işık (aged 50), movie actor
- 12 September – Agop Dilaçar (aged 84), Turkish linguist of Armenian descent
- 28 September – Cevat Yurdakul (assassinated at age 37), prosecutor and police chief of Adana

== Gallery ==
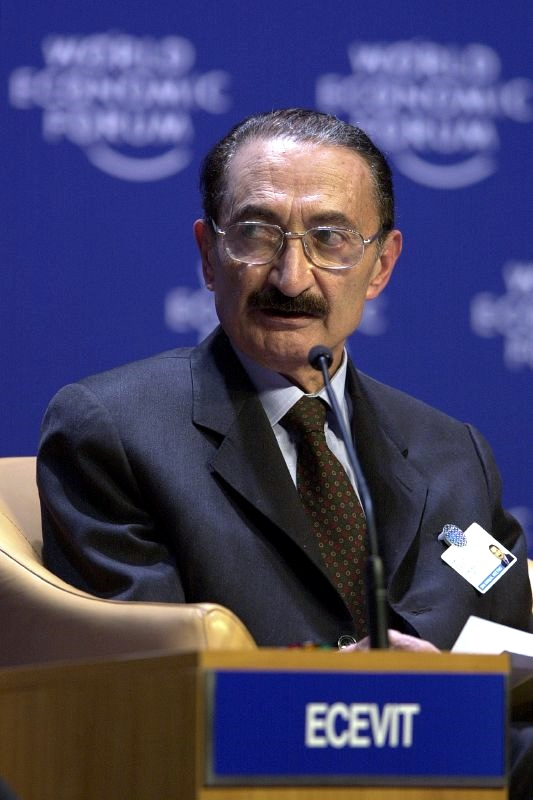
Bülent Ecevit

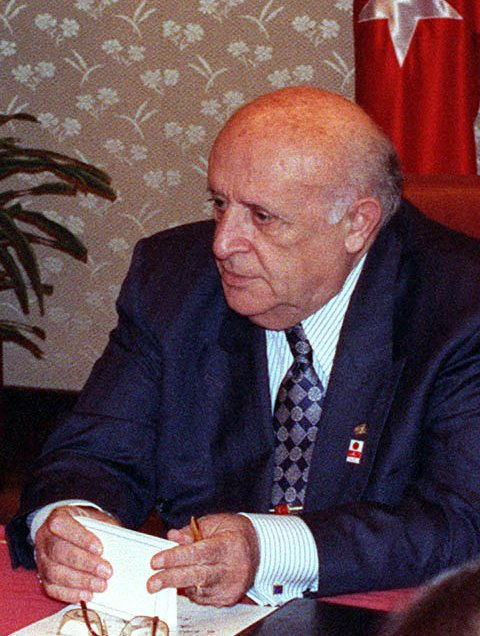
Süleyman Demirel

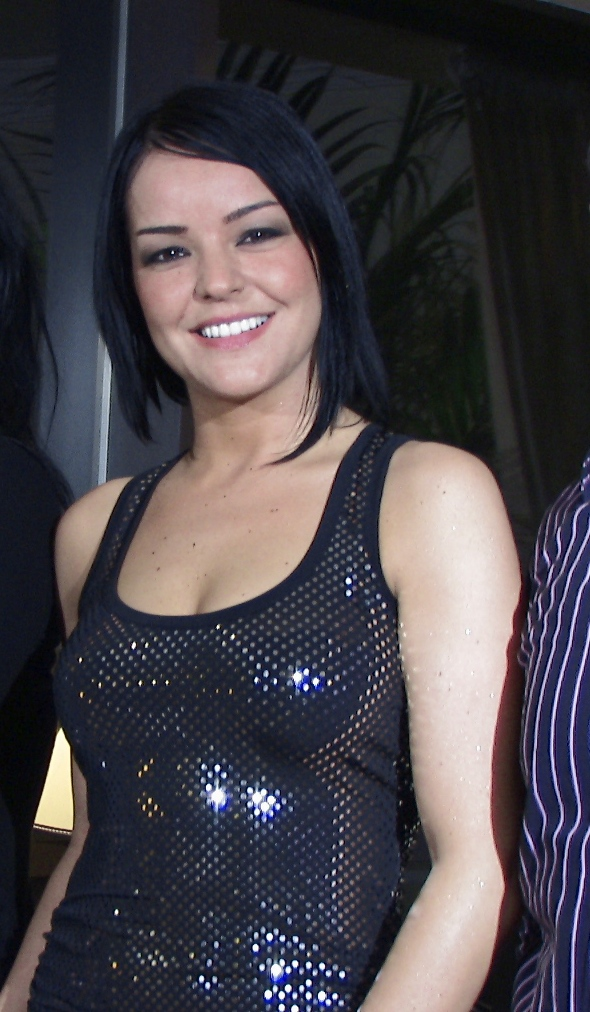
Bengü

== See also ==
- 1978–79 1.Lig
- List of Turkish films of 1979
