= 1974 in Turkey =

- Centuries: 20th; 21st
- Decades: 1950s; 1960s; 1970s; 1980s; 1990s
- See also: List of years in Turkey

Events in the year 1974 in Turkey.

== Parliament ==
- 15th Parliament of Turkey

== Incumbents ==
- President – Fahri Korutürk
- Prime Minister

Naim Talu (to 26 January 1974)
Bülent Ecevit (26 January–17 November 1974)
Sadi Irmak (from 17 November 1974)

- Leader of the opposition – Süleyman Demirel (26 January–17 November 1974)

== Ruling party and the main opposition ==
- Ruling party: Republican People's Party (CHP); coalition partner National Salvation Party (MSP) (26 January–17 November 1974)
- Main opposition: Justice Party (AP) (26 January–17 November 1974)

== Cabinet ==
- 36th government of Turkey (to 26 January 1974)
- 37th government of Turkey (16 January–17 November 1974)
- 38th government of Turkey (from 17 November 1974)

== Events ==
- 26 January – Turkish Airlines Flight 301 crashes
- 3 March – Turkish Airlines Flight 981 crashes near Paris with 346 fatalities.
- 10 March – Gürdal Duyars sculpture Güzel İstanbul is erected on Karaköy Square.
- 18 March – Gürdal Duyars sculpture Güzel İstanbul is removed from Karaköy Square.
- 26 May – Fenerbahçe wins the championship.
- 22 June – Socialist Labor Party of Turkey formed.
- 15 July – 1974 Cypriot coup d'état.
- 20 July – Turkish Armed Forces invade Cyprus.
- 31 July – Ceasefire on Cyprus.
- 14 August – Turkish military activities resume on Cyprus as Geneva peace talks fail.
- 9 September – Keban Dam becomes operational.

== Births ==
- 1 April – Isa Kahraman, member of the Dutch Parliament
- 17 May – Şebnem Dönmez, actress and TV program presenter
- 31 May – Kenan Doğulu, singer
- 27 August – Hakan Haslaman, stuntman, and also director and film producer
- 21 September – Özgür Özel, pharmacist and politician
- 1 October – Hasan Özer, footballer
- 12 October – Ebru Gündeş, singer

== Deaths ==
- 25 May – Ulvi Uraz, theatre director
- 5 June – Hilmi Ziya Ülken, scholar and writer
- 22 July – Orhan Brandt, philatelist
- 26 October – Fahrettin Altay, general
- 14 December – Yakup Kadri Karaosmanoğlu, novelist

== Gallery ==
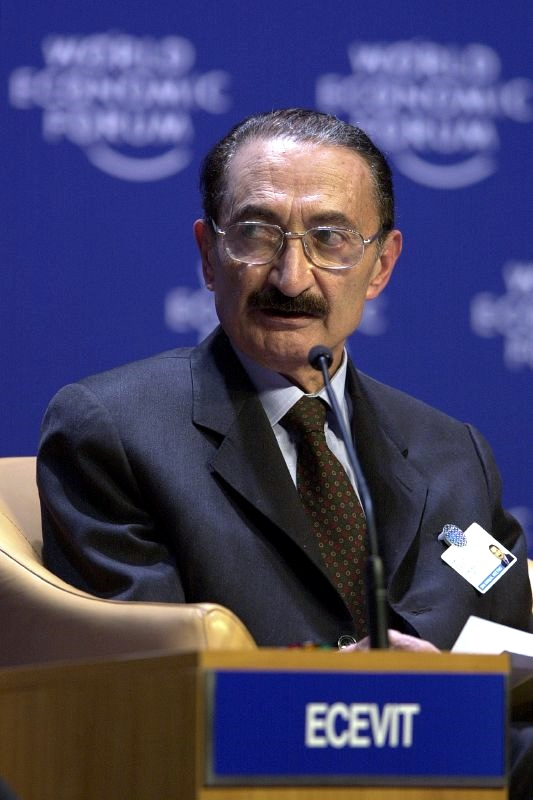
Bülent Ecevit

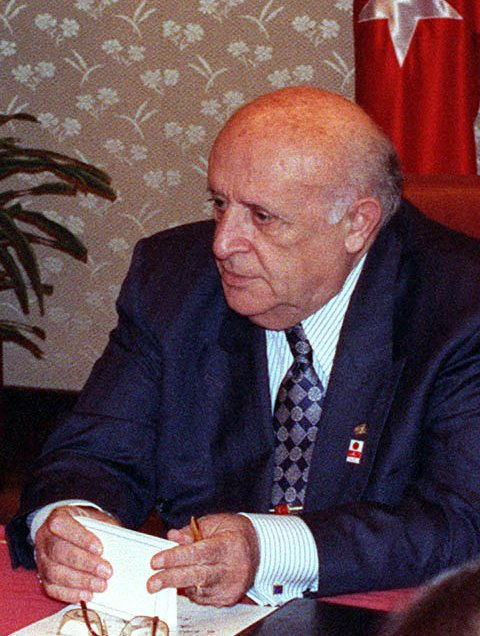
Süleyman Demirel

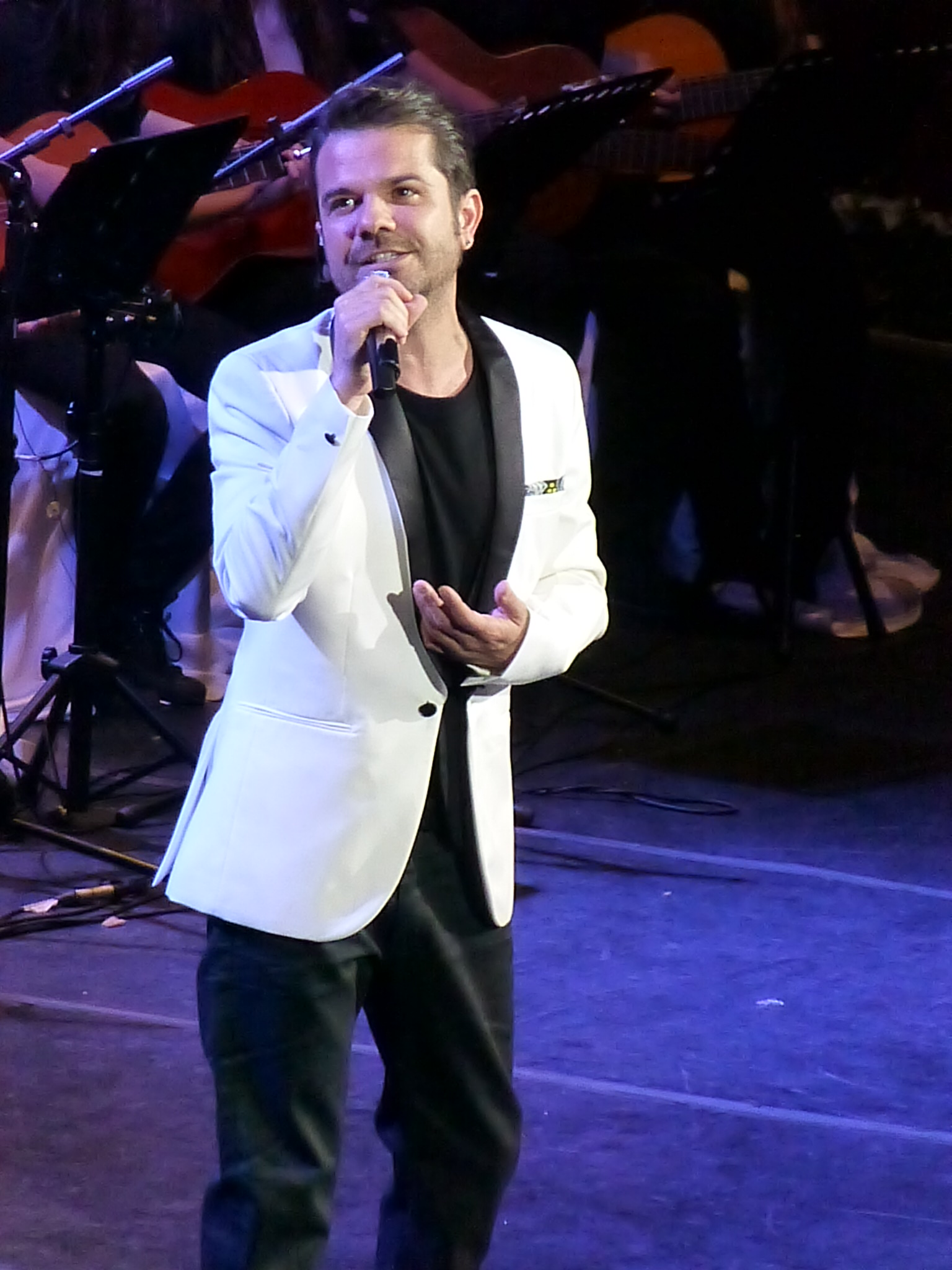
Kenan Doğulu

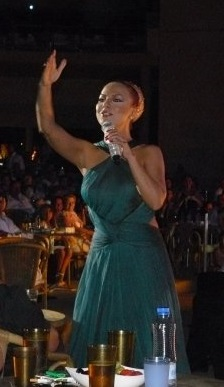
Ebru Gündeş

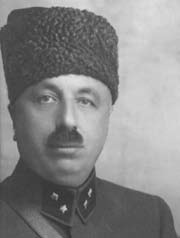
Fahrettin Altay

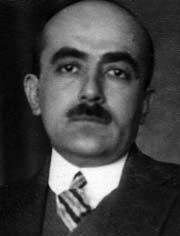
Yakup Kadri Karosmanoğlu

== See also ==
- 1973–74 1.Lig
- List of Turkish films of 1974
