= 1972 in Turkey =

- Centuries: 20th; 21st
- Decades: 1950s; 1960s; 1970s; 1980s; 1990s
- See also: List of years in Turkey

Events in the year 1972 in Turkey.

== Parliament ==
- 14th Parliament of Turkey

== Incumbents ==
- President – Cevdet Sunay
- Prime Minister:

Nihat Erim (up to 22 May 1972)
Ferit Melen (from 22 May 1972)

== Cabinet ==
- 34th government of Turkey (up to 22 May 1972)
- 35th government of Turkey (from 22 May 1972)

== Events ==
- 8 February – Documents about the Yenice Conference between İsmet İnönü and Winston Churchill in 1943 disclosed.
- 30 March – Some militants of People’s Liberation Army, including Mahir Çayan, killed during gunfight.
- 4 May – General Kemalettin Eken is injured in a terrorist attack.
- 6 May – Three members of Turkish People’s Liberation Army receive death sentences.
- 8 May – İsmet İnönü resigns as chairman of CHP.
- 14 May – Bülent Ecevit is the new chairman of CHP.
- 28 May – Galatasaray wins the Turkish championship.
- 16 July – Demetrios I elected as patriarch.
- 4 September – Republican Party formed.
- 1 October – Turkish boxer Cemal Kamacı wins European championship in 63.5 kg. weight category

== Births ==
- 29 January – Engin Günaydın, actor and screenwriter
- 6 July – Levent Üzümcü, actor
- 1 October – Ayse Yigit, Belgian politician
- 17 October – Tarkan, singer

== Deaths ==
- 6 January – Tevfik Rüştü Aras former foreign minister
- 6 May – Deniz Gezmiş and two friends, members of armed underground organization People's Liberation Army of Turkey
- 15 September Ulvi Cemal Erkin, composer
- 19 December Ahmet Emin Yalman, journalist

== Gallery ==
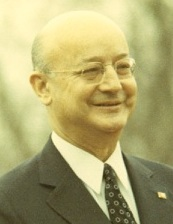
Nihat Erim

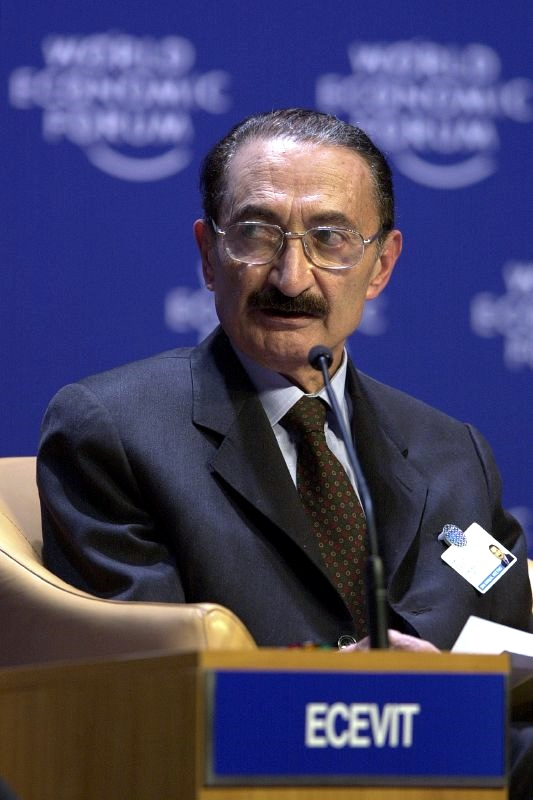
Bülent Ecevit

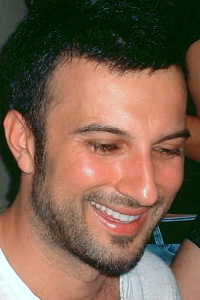
Tarkan

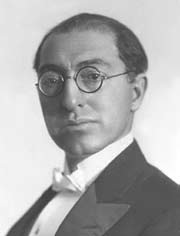
Tevfik Rüştü Aras

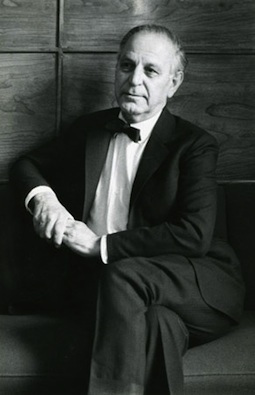
Ulvi Camal Erkin

== See also ==
- 1971–72 1.Lig
- List of Turkish films of 1972
- Turkey at the 1972 Summer Olympics
