= 1985 in Turkey =

- Centuries: 20th; 21st
- Decades: 1960s; 1970s; 1980s; 1990s; 2000s
- See also: List of years in Turkey

Events in the year 1985 in Turkey.

== Parliament ==
- 17th Parliament of Turkey

== Incumbents ==
- President – Kenan Evren
- Prime Minister – Turgut Özal
- Leader of the opposition –

Necdet Calp (up to 27 June)
Aydın Güven Gürkan (from 27 June)

== Ruling party and the main opposition ==
- Ruling party – Motherland Party (ANAP)
- Main opposition

People’s Party (HP) (up to 3 November)
Social Democratic Populist Party (SHP) (from 3 November)

== Cabinet ==
45th government of Turkey

== Events ==
=== January ===
- 1 January – Value added tax (KDV) introduced.

=== February ===
- 13 February – National Salvation Party leaders are acquitted.
- 26 February – Tarık Akan's Pehlivan wins honorable mention in 35th Berlin International Film Festival.

=== March ===
- 12 March – Armenian terrorists attack the Turkish embassy in Ottawa.

=== April ===
- 2 April – Prime Minister Turgut Özal meets President Ronald Reagan.

=== June ===
- 2 June – Fenerbahçe wins the championship.

=== July ===
- 9 July – State visit of Helmut Kohl, chancellor of Federal Republic of Germany.

=== October ===
- 20 October – Census (population 50,664,45)

=== November ===
- 3 November – Populist Party and Social Democracy Party merge to form Social Democratic Populist Party.
- 7 November – Heavy rainfall in Istanbul
- 14 November – Rahşan Ecevit, wife of Bülent Ecevit, founds Democratic Left Party (DSP).
- 18 November – Rahşan Ecevit elected as the chairperson of Democratic Left Party (DSP).

== Births ==
- 12 March – Binnaz Uslu, middle distance runner
- 13 March – Taner Sağır, weightlifter
- 23 April – Emrah Keskin, singer and winner of Türkstar
- 17 August – Sema Apak, short distance runner
- 5 November – Pınar Saka, sprinter

== Deaths ==
- 20 September – Ruhi Su (born in 1912), folk singer
- 7 October – Cemal Reşit Rey (born in 1904), composer
- 24 November – Sinan Alaağaç (born 1960), footballer (goalkeeper)
- 29 November – Afet İnan (born in 1908), academic (Atatürk's adoptive daughter)

== Gallery ==
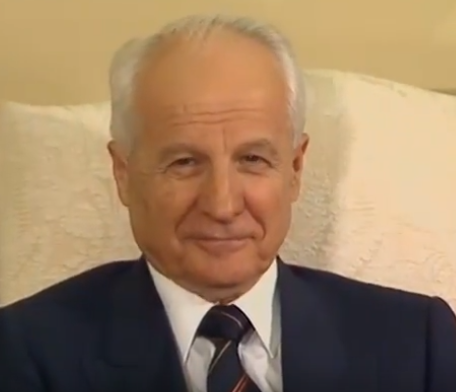
Kenan Evren

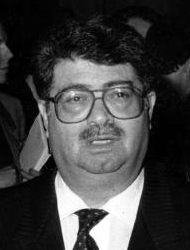
Turgut Özal

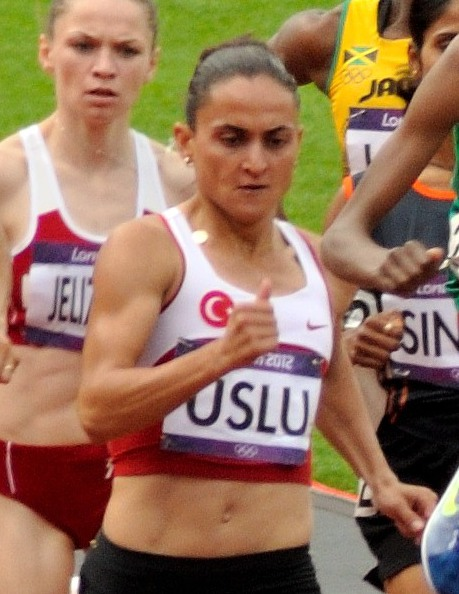
Binnaz Uslu

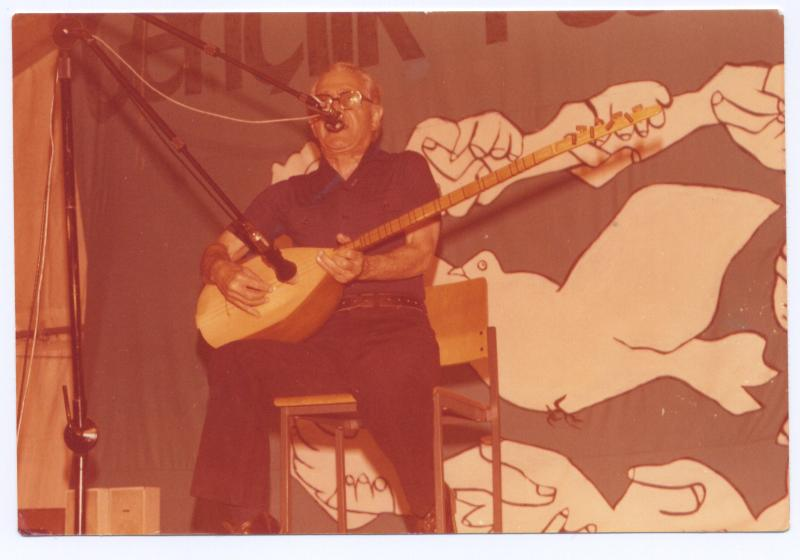
Ruhi Su

== See also ==
- Turkey in the Eurovision Song Contest 1984
- 1984–85 1.Lig
