= 1975 in Turkey =

- Centuries: 20th; 21st
- Decades: 1950s; 1960s; 1970s; 1980s; 1990s
- See also: List of years in Turkey

Events in the year 1975 in Turkey.

== Parliament ==
- 15th Parliament of Turkey

== Incumbents ==
- President – Fahri Korutürk
- Prime Minister –
  - until 31 March: Sadi Irmak
  - starting 31 March: Süleyman Demirel
- Leader of the opposition – Bülent Ecevit

== Ruling party and the main opposition ==
- Ruling party – Justice Party (AP) and coalition partners National Salvation Party (MSP), Republican Reliance Party (CGP), and Nationalist Movement Party (MHP) – (starting 31 March) – The government is sometimes called 1.MC
- Main opposition – Republican People's Party (CHP) (26 January – 17 November 1974)

== Cabinet ==
- 38th government of Turkey (until 31 March)
- 39th government of Turkey, also called "First MC" (starting 31 March)

== Events ==
- 30 January – Turkish Airlines Flight 345 crashes in Marmara Sea due to airport infrastructure problems.
- 6 February – Turkey suspends talks with United States.
- 13 February – Federated State of Northern Cyprus proclaimed.
- 22 March – Turkey participates in the Eurovision Song Contest for the first time. Turkish contestant Semiha Yankı receives only 3 points, placing last.
- 31 March – Süleyman Demirel forms a coalition government.
- 22 April – Bildergerg meeting in Çeşme, İzmir
- 1 June – Fenerbahçe wins the championship.
- 6 September – 1975 Lice earthquake
- 3 October – U.S. partially lifts its arms embargo on Turkey.
- 22 October – Daniş Tunalıgil, Turkish ambassador to Austria was assassinated by Armenian terrorists.
- 24 October – İsmail Erez, Turkish ambassador to France was assassinated by Armenian terrorists.
- 25 December – State visit of Alexei Kosygin.

== Births ==
- 27 May – Feryal Özel, astrophysicist
- 10 August – İlhan Mansız, football player
- 2 September – Defne Joy Foster, actress

== Deaths ==
- 7 July – Reşat Ekrem Koçu, historian (b. 1905)
- 12 July – Latife Uşaklıgil, Atatürk's wife (b. 1898)
- 22 September – Bedri Rahmi Eyüboğlu, painter and poet (b. 1911)
- 12 December – Nihal Atsız, nationalist writer (b. 1905)

== Gallery ==
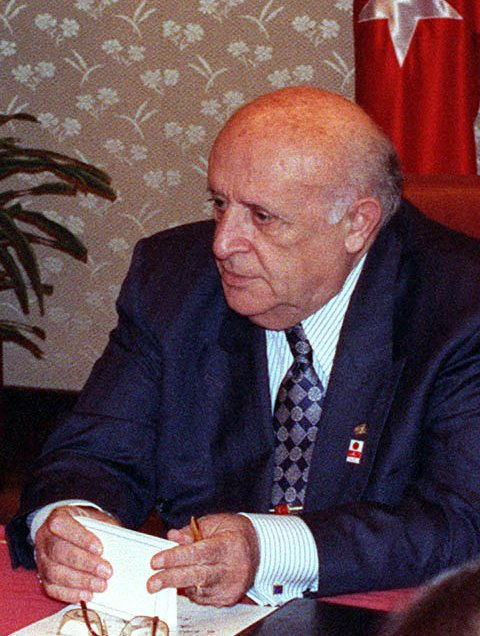
Süleyman Demirel

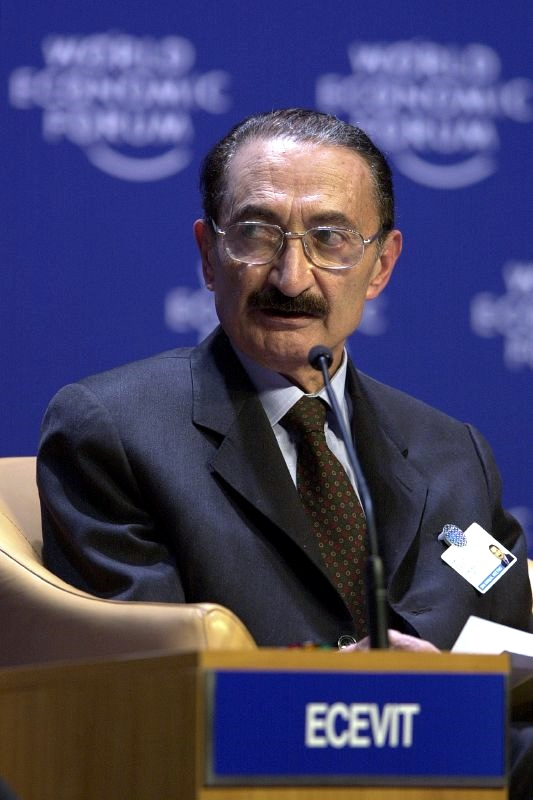
Bülent Ecevit

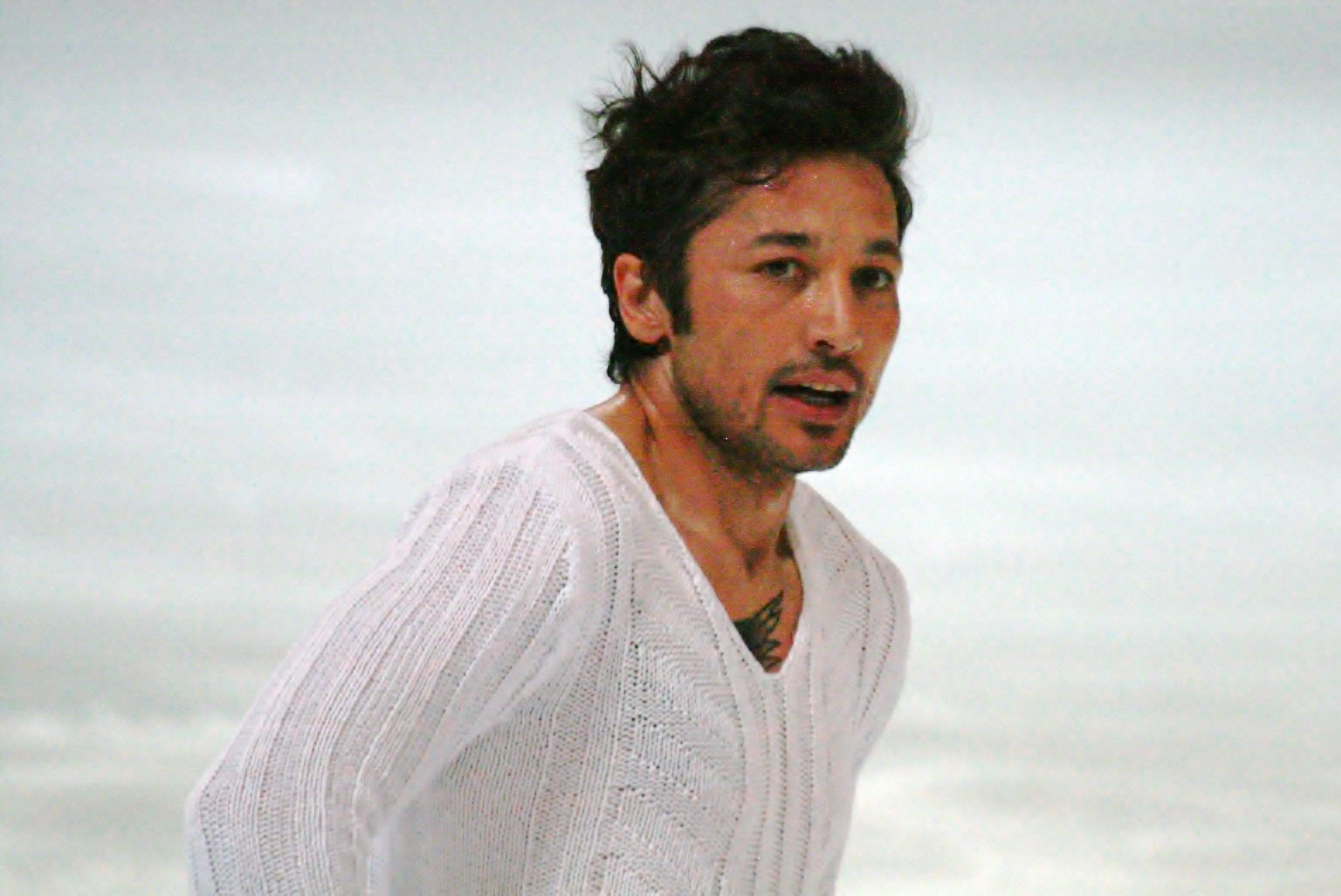
İlhan Mansız

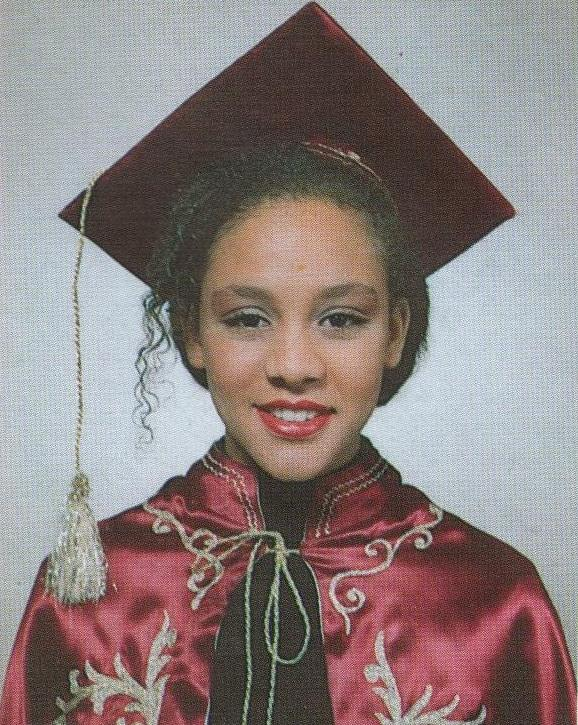
Defne Joy Foster

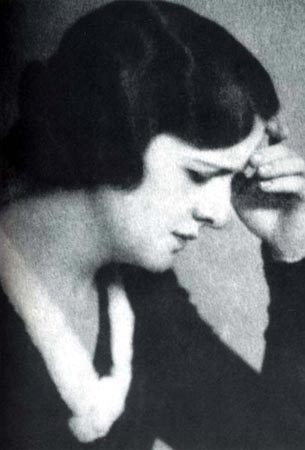
Latife Uşaklıgil

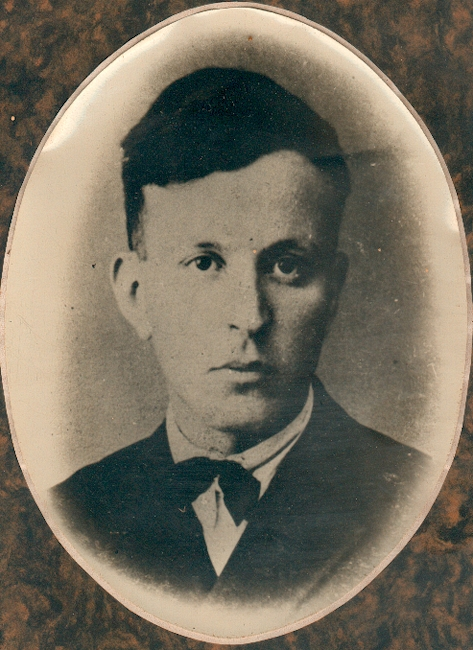
Nihal Atsız

== See also ==
- Turkey in the Eurovision Song Contest 1975
- 1974-75 1.Lig
- List of Turkish films of 1975
