= 1978 in Turkey =

- Centuries: 20th; 21st
- Decades: 1950s; 1960s; 1970s; 1980s; 1990s
- See also: List of years in Turkey

Events in the year 1978 in Turkey.

== Parliament ==
- 16th Parliament of Turkey

== Incumbents ==
- President – Fahri Korutürk
- Prime Minister –

Süleyman Demirel (up to 5 January)
Bülent Ecevit (from 5 January)

- Leader of the opposition –

Bülent Ecevit (up to 5 January)
Süleyman Demirel (from 5 January)

== Ruling party and the main opposition ==
- Ruling party

Justice Party (AP) and coalition partners (up to 5 January)
Republican People's Party (CHP) (from 5 January)

- Main opposition

Republican People's Party (CHP) (up to 5 January)
Justice Party (AP) (from 5 January)

== Cabinet ==
- 41st government of Turkey (up to 5 January)
- 42nd government of Turkey (from 5 January)

== Events ==
- 30 January – Student demonstrations in Ankara.
- 17 March – Turkey criticizes Israeli invasion of Lebanon.
- 7 April – Server Tanilli, an academic, survived a terrorist attack in Istanbul.
- 28 May – Fenerbahçe wins the championship.
- 31 May – Meeting between Ecevit and U.S. president Jimmy Carter.
- 1 June – Türkan Şoray, star in the film Selvi Boylum Al Yazmalım, wins Best Actress in Tashkent Film Festival.
- 11 July – Bedrettin Cömert of Hacettepe University was killed in a terrorist attack.
- 27 September – United States lifts embargo on aid to Turkey.
- 11 December – Ahmet Enünlü wins gold in Mr. Universe bodybuilding competition.

== Births ==
- 11 March – Hayko Cepkin, singer
- 11 May – Ece Erken TV hostess and actress
- 7 July – Yasemin Kozanoğlu, model
- 8 August -Ebru Yaşar, singer
- 28 December – Özgü Namal, actress

== Deaths ==
- 30 March – Memduh Tağmaç (aged 74), general and former chief of staff
- 1 April – İsmail Hakkı Baltacıoğlu (aged 92), academic and journalist
- 24 March – Doğan Öz (assassinated at age 44), prosecutor
- 27 July – Ferit Alnar (aged 72), composer
- 22 October – Fevzi Lütfi Karaosmanoğlu (aged 78), politician

== Gallery ==
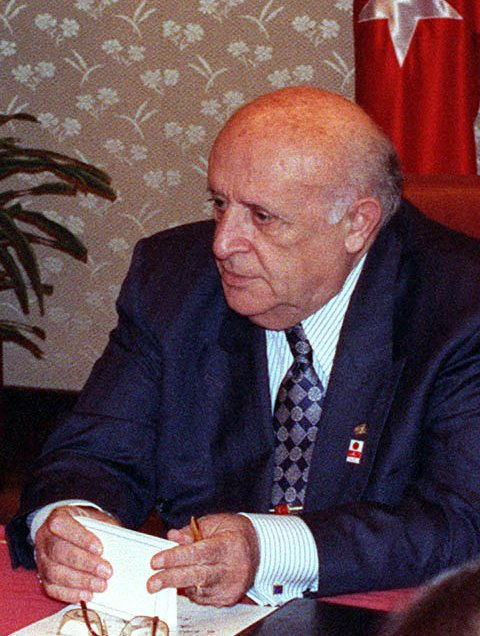
Süleyman Demirel

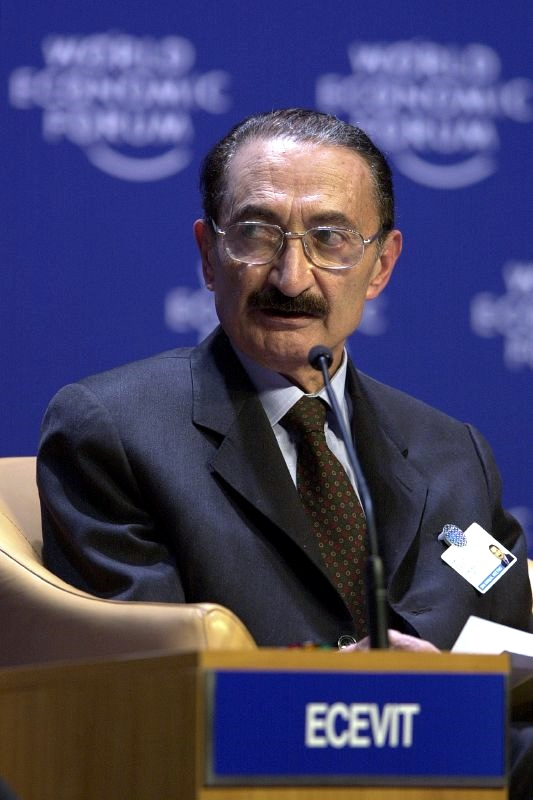
Bülent Ecevit

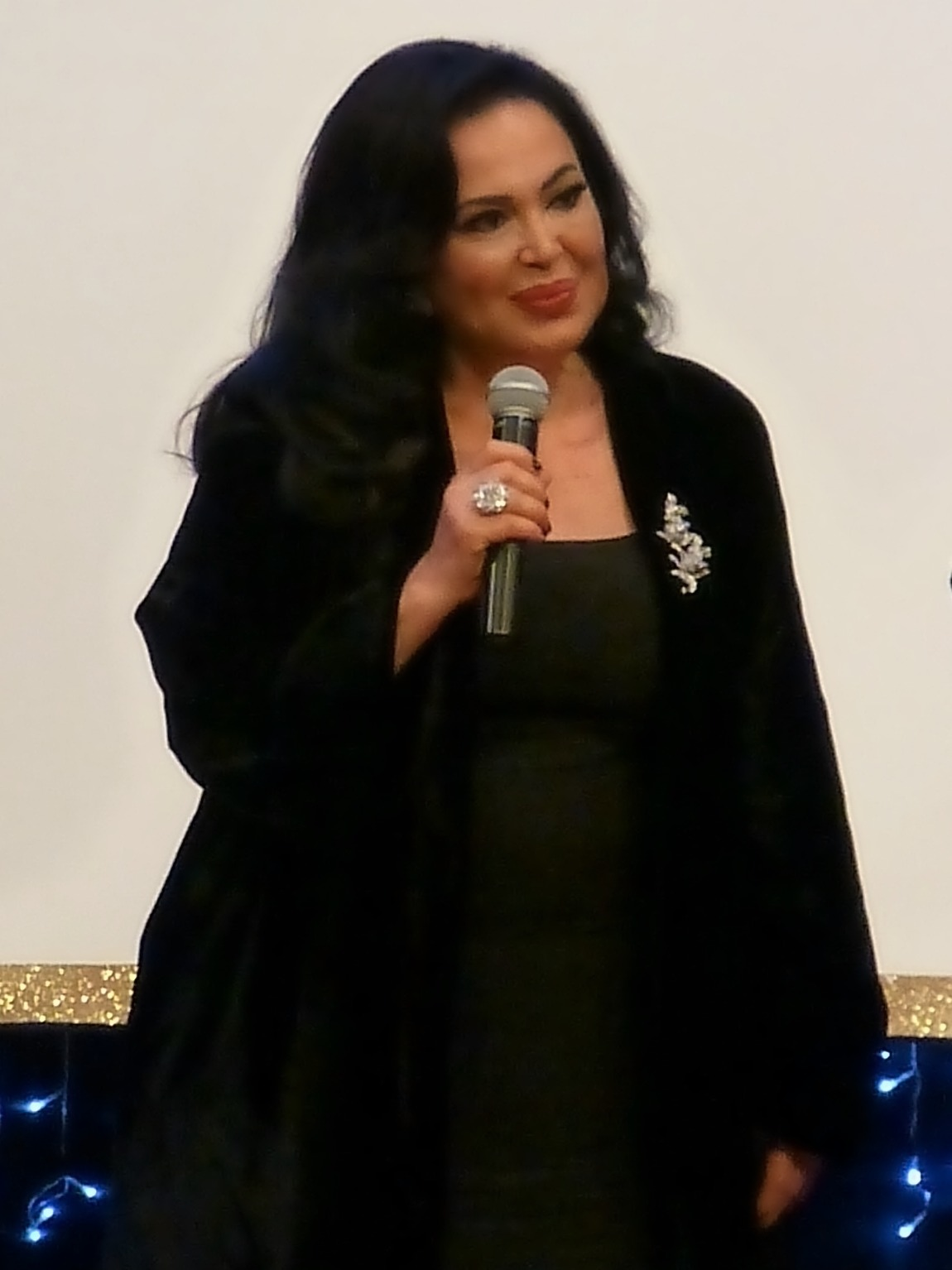
Türkan Şoray

== See also ==
- List of Turkish films of 1978
- Turkey in the Eurovision Song Contest 1978
- 1977–78 1.Lig
