= 1973 in Turkey =

- Centuries: 20th; 21st
- Decades: 1950s; 1960s; 1970s; 1980s; 1990s
- See also: List of years in Turkey

Events in the year 1973 in Turkey.

== Parliament ==
- 14th Parliament of Turkey (up to 14 October)
- 15th Parliament of Turkey

== Incumbents ==
- President

Cevdet Sunay (up to 28 March 1973)
Fahri Korutürk (from 8 April 1972)

- Prime Minister:

Ferit Melen (up to 15 April 1973)
Naim Talu (from 15 April 1973)

== Cabinet ==
- 35th government of Turkey (up to 15 April 1973)
- 36th government of Turkey (from 15 April 1973)

== Events ==
- 28 January – Turkish consuls Mehmet Baydar and Bahadır Demir assassinated by an Armenian terrorist.
- 3 March – Republican Party merges with Reliance Party to become Republican Reliance Party.
- 6 April – Fahri Korutürk elected as Turkish president.
- 27 May – Galatasaray wins the championship.
- 14 October – Republican People's Party (CHP) wins the general elections with plurality.
- 30 October – Bosphorus Bridge opens.
- 25 December – İsmet İnönü dies.

== Births ==
- 10 May – Rüştü Reçber, goalkeeper
- 14 June – Halil Mutlu, weightlifter
- 16 June – Balçiçek İlter, journalist
- 27 August – Burak Kut, singer
- 31 October – Arzum Onan actress
- 12 November – Alper Celen, entrepreneur

== Deaths ==
- 27 January – Turkish consuls Mehmet Baydar and Bahadır Demir assassinated by an Armenian terrorist.
- 21 March – Aşık Veysel, folk poet
- 21 April – Kemal Tahir, novelist
- 13 October – Cevat Şakir Kabaağaçlı (pen name Halikarnas Balıkçısı), novelist
- 8 November – Faruk Nafiz Çamlıbel, poet.
- 25 December – İsmet İnönü, second president of Turkey

== Gallery ==
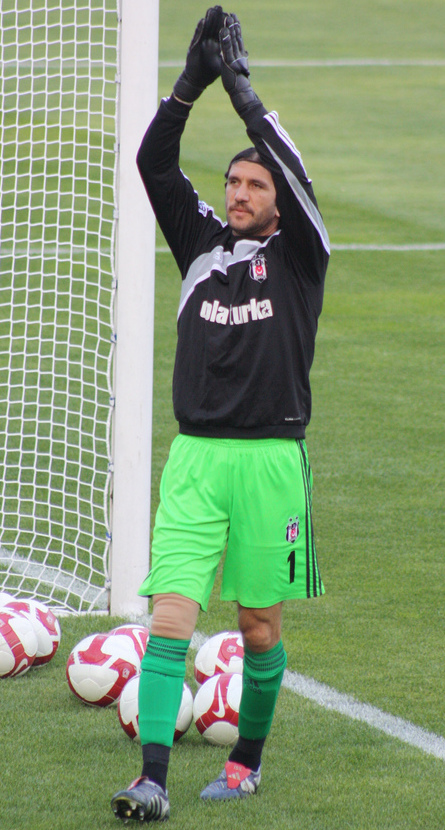
Rüştü Recber

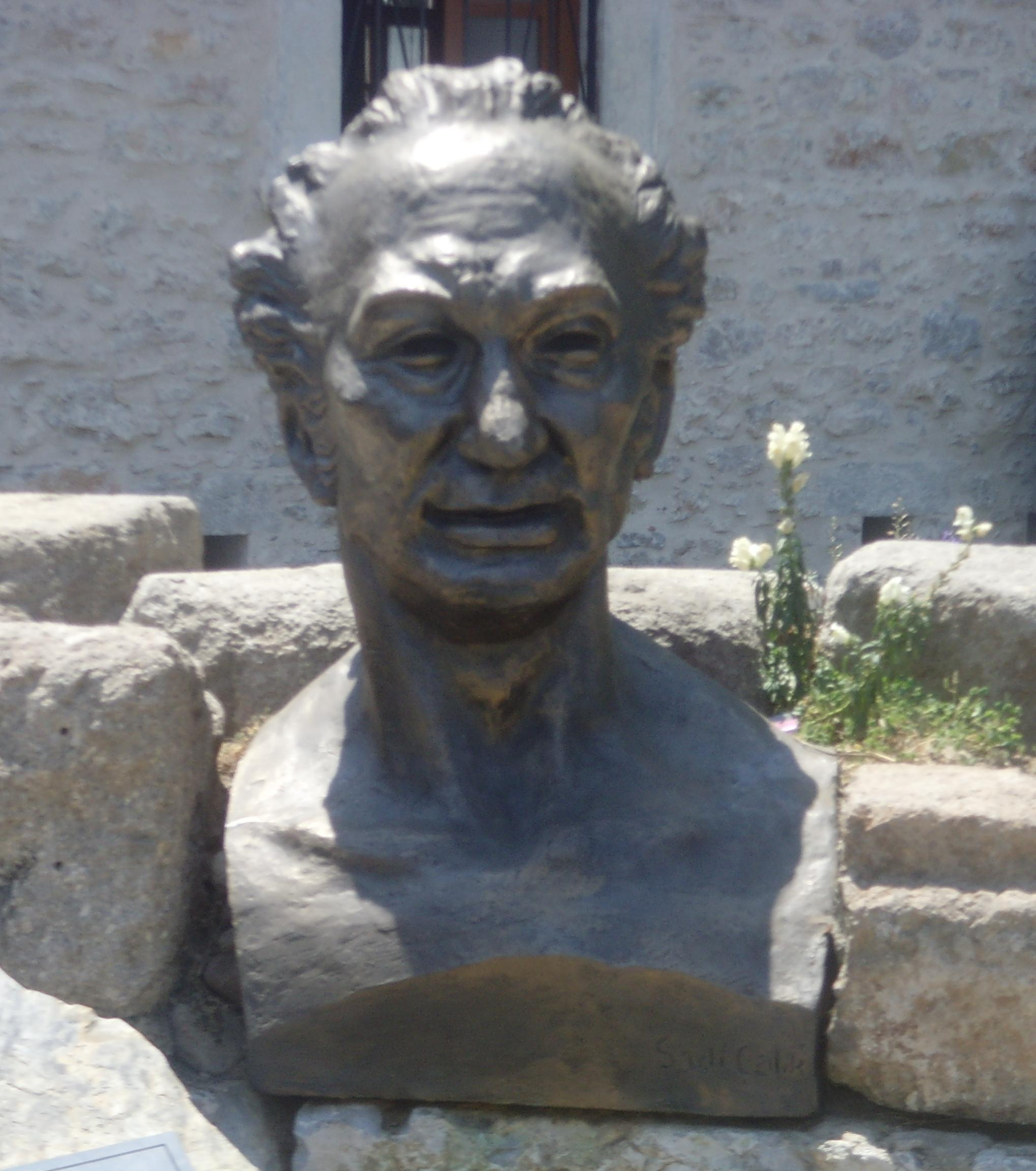
Cevat Şakir Kabaağaçlı (bust)

== See also ==
- 1972–73 1.Lig
- List of Turkish films of 1973
