= 1977 in Turkey =

- Centuries: 20th; 21st
- Decades: 1950s; 1960s; 1970s; 1980s; 1990s
- See also: List of years in Turkey

Events in the year 1977 in Turkey.

== Parliament ==
- 15th Parliament of Turkey (up to 5 June)
- 16th Parliament of Turkey

== Incumbents ==
- President – Fahri Korutürk
- Prime Minister

Süleyman Demirel (up to 21 June 1977)
Bülent Ecevit (21 June 1977 – 21 July 1977)
Süleyman Demirel (from 21 July 1977)

- Leader of the opposition

Bülent Ecevit (up to 21 June 1977)
Süleyman Demirel (21 June 1977 – 21 July 1977)
Bülent Ecevit (from 21 July 1977)

== Ruling party and the main opposition ==
- Ruling party –

Justice Party (AP) and the coalition partners (up to 21 June 1977)
Republican People's Party (CHP) (21 June 1977 – 21 July 1977)
Justice Party (AP) and coalition partners National Salvation Party (MSP), and Nationalist Movement Party (MHP) (from 21 July) – This government is sometimes called 2.MC

- Main opposition

Republican People's Party (CHP) (up to 21 June 1977)
Justice Party (AP) (21 June 1977 – 21 July 1977)
Republican People's Party (CHP) (from 21 July 1977)

== Cabinet ==
- 39th government of Turkey (up to 21 June 1977)
- 40th government of Turkey (21 June 1977 – 21 July 1977)
- 41st government of Turkey (from 21 July 1977)

== Events ==
- 3 January – Kirkuk-Iskenderun pipeline officially opens.
- 19 March – A Turkish aircraft hijacked to Beirut, Lebanon
- 1 May – Thirty-seven dead in May Day rally in Istanbul.
- 3 June – Trabzonspor wins the championship.
- 5 June – General elections. (CHP 213 seats, AP 180 seats, MSP 24 seats, MHP 16 seats, CGP 3 seats, DP 1 seat)
- 14 August – Turkey claims Greece violated international treaties by militarizing the Aegean islands.

== Births ==
- 1 January – Zeynep Tokuş actress
- 2 January – Ahu Türkpençe actress
- 3 August – Deniz Akkaya, model and actress
- 20 December – Kerem Kabadayı, drummer and songwriter
- 26 December – Fatih Akyel, footballer

== Deaths ==
- 24 February – Yorgo Bacanos, musician
- 10 July – Şükrü Gülesin, former footballer
- 21 October – Ferit Tüzün, composer
- 14 December – Oğuz Atay, novelist

== Gallery ==
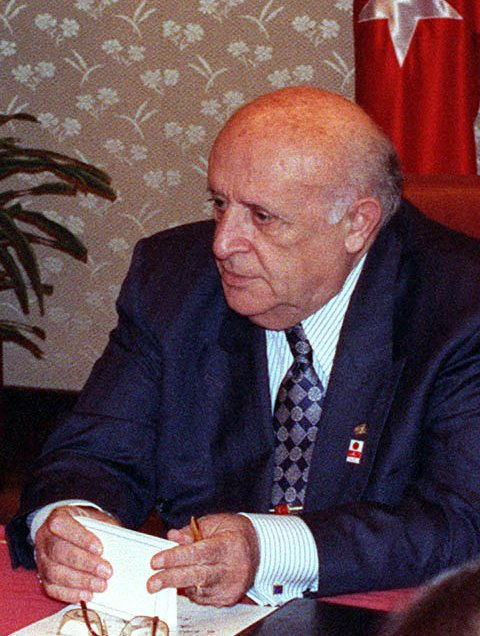
Süleyman Demirel

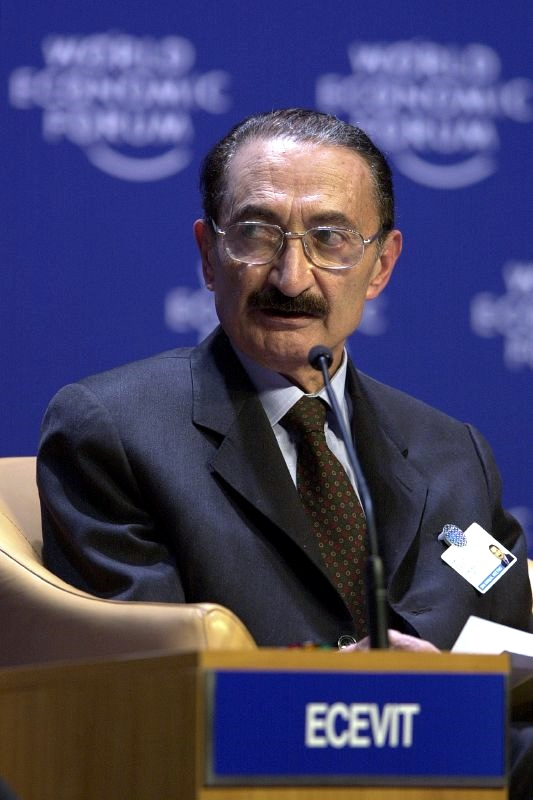
Bülent Ecevit

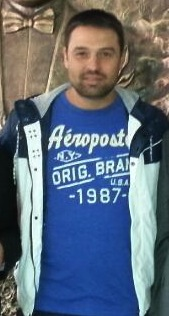
Fatih Akyel

== See also ==
- 1976–77 1.Lig
- List of Turkish films of 1977
