= 1976 in Turkey =

- Centuries: 20th; 21st
- Decades: 1950s; 1960s; 1970s; 1980s; 1990s
- See also: List of years in Turkey

Events in the year 1976 in Turkey.

== Parliament ==
- 15th Parliament of Turkey

== Incumbents ==
- President – Fahri Korutürk
- Prime Minister – Süleyman Demirel
- Leader of the opposition – Bülent Ecevit

== Ruling party and the main opposition ==
- Ruling party – Justice Party (AP) and coalition partners
- Main opposition – Republican People's Party (CHP)

== Cabinet ==
- 39th government of Turkey (also called first MC)

== Events ==
- 4 January – Replica of Trojan Horse installed in Troy, Çanakkale
- 28 March – Turkey and United States sign a defense agreement.
- 30 April – The Seyrani Monument is inaugurated in Develi.
- 12 May – Islamic Conference opens.
- 30 May – Trabzonspor wins the championship.
- 30 July – Research vessel RV MTA Sismik 1 in Aegean Sea
- 19 September – Turkish Airlines Flight 452 crashes near Isparta
- 24 November – Çaldıran–Muradiye earthquake in East Anatolia

== Births ==
- 1 January – Mustafa Doğan, Turkish-German footballer and sportscaster
- 15 January – Zara, singer
- 16 March – Nurgül Yeşilçay, actress
- 6 June – Hamza Yerlikaya, Olympic medalist wrestler
- 2 July – Derya Büyükuncu, swimmer
- 17 October – Nil Karaibrahimgil, singer

== Deaths ==
- 5 January – Hamit Kaplan Olympic medalist wrestler
- 4 February – Kuzgun Acar, Sculptor.
- 24 March – Şevket Süreyya Aydemir, economist and author
- 20 September – Nazim Terzioglu, mathematician

== Gallery ==
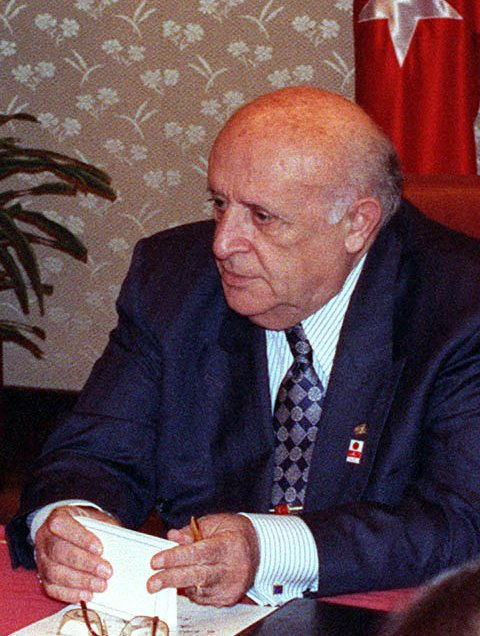
Süleyman Demirel

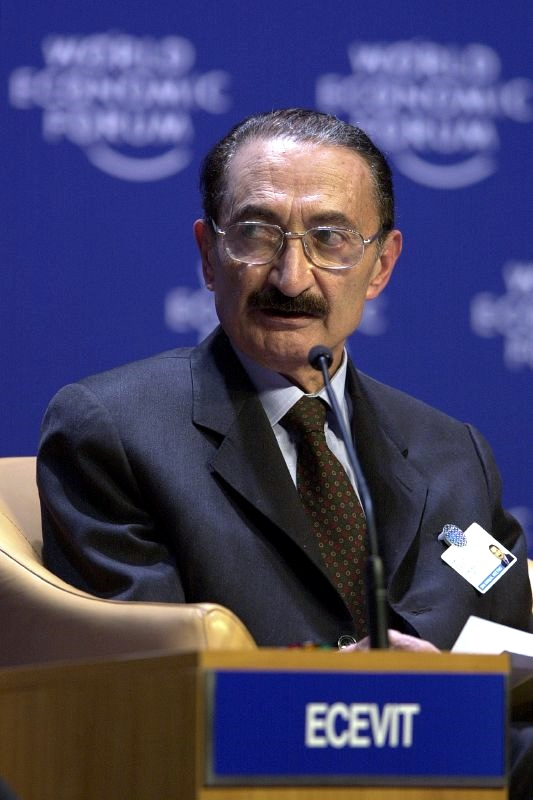
Bülent Ecevit

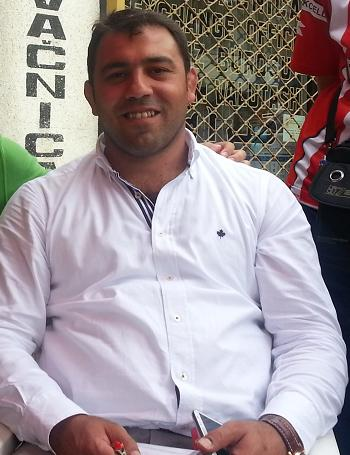
Hamza Yerlikaya

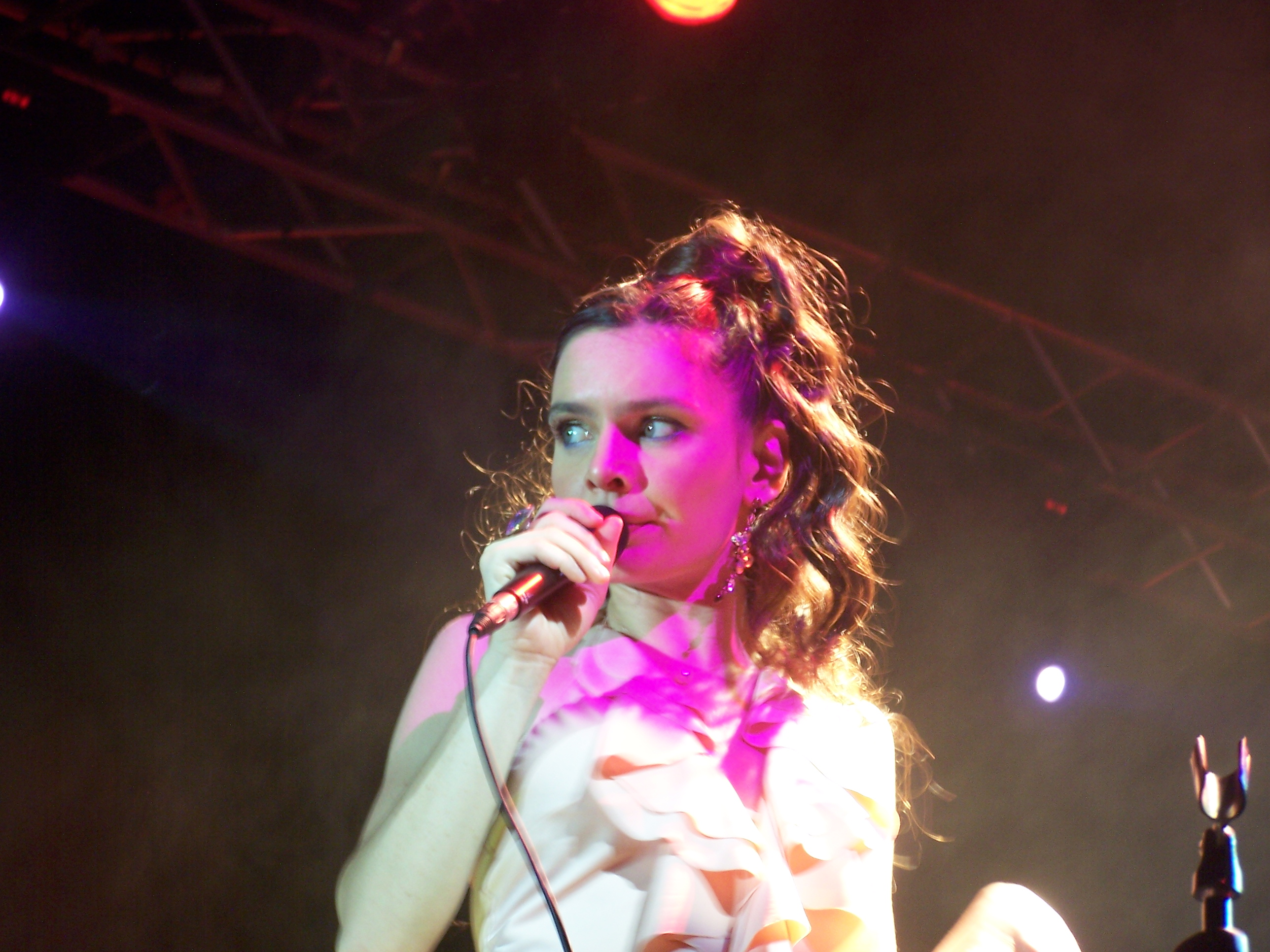
Nil Karaibrahimgil

== See also ==
- 1975–76 1.Lig
- List of Turkish films of 1976
- Turkey at the 1976 Summer Olympics
- Turkey at the 1976 Winter Olympics
