= Cihad Baban =

Turkish politician

Mustafa Cihad Baban
- Born: 26 September 1911; Istanbul, Turkey
- Died: 28 September 1984 (aged 73); Ankara, Turkey
- Citizenship: Turkish
- Education: Galatasaray High School, Istanbul University
- Occupations: Turkish journalist, author and politician
- Years active: 1946-1984
- Political party: Democratic Party, Republican People's Party

Mustafa Cihad Baban (Cihad also spelled Cihat; 26 September 1911 – 28 September 1984) was a Turkish journalist, author and politician. He was a parliamentary deputy in the 1950s and 1960s.

== Background ==
Baban was born in Istanbul, where he attended Galatasaray High School, and graduated from Istanbul University in 1934.

== Career ==
As a journalist, Baban contributed to newspapers including Son Posta, Yeni Sabah, Cumhuriyet, and Tercüman, and he was one of the founders of the Turkish Journalists' Association in 1946. He also wrote a variety of books.

Baban was elected in the 1946 general election for the Democratic Party, representing Istanbul. He was re-elected in the 1950 general election and 1954 general election, representing İzmir Province until the 1957 elections, in which he was not elected.

He was a member of the constituent assembly which wrote the 1961 Constitution of Turkey, and was Minister of Tourism and Promotion (January to August 1961) in the 1960–1961 post-coup government of Cemal Gürsel. In the October 1961 general election he was elected again for the Republican People's Party representing Istanbul, and in the 1965 general election representing Çanakkale. He later served as Minister of Culture in the 1980–1983 post-coup government of Bülend Ulusu.

He died in Ankara on 28 September 1984.

== Books ==
- Hitler and National Socialism (1933),
- İsyan (translated from Georges Simenom) (1944),
- Churchill (1958),
- Chinese-Russian Disagreement (1965),
- Adanauer (1965),
- Truman Memories (1965),
- Ho Chi Minh (1968),
- The Gallery of Politics (1970)
- Public Chats (1983),
- The History of China Before Christ (1983),
