= Şenol Akın =

Turkish footballer

Personal information
- Date of birth: 20 December 1984 (age 41)
- Place of birth: Gebze, Kocaeli, Turkey
- Height: 1.67 m (5 ft 5 1/2 in)
- Position: Midfielder

Youth career
- 2000–2002: Körfez B.H.Y.

Senior career*
| Years | Team | Apps | (Gls) |
| 2002–2003 | İzmitspor | 20 | (3) |
| 2005–2012 | Karabükspor | 164 | (24) |
| 2012–2014 | Konyaspor | 34 | (1) |
| 2014–2015 | Şanlıurfaspor | 15 | (1) |
| 2015–2016 | Denizlispor | 36 | (5) |
| 2016–2017 | Bucaspor | 16 | (0) |
- * Club domestic league appearances and goals

Şenol Akın (born 20 December 1984) is a Turkish former professional footballer who played as a midfielder.

== Career ==
Akın began his career in the amateur leagues of Kocaeli with Körfez Belediyesi Hereke Yıldızspor. In 2002, Akın moved to Izmitspor and made his debut in the TFF Third League. After one season with the club, Akın moved back to the amateur leagues until 2005, when he joined Karabükspor.

On 31 August 2016, he joined Bucaspor on a one-year contract.
