= Salise Abanozoğlu =

Turkish teacher and politician (1904–1983)

Member of the Grand National Assembly for Trabzon
- In office 31 March 1939 – 14 June 1946

Personal details
- Born: 1904 Trabzon, Ottoman Empire
- Died: 10 October 1983 (aged 78–79) Ankara, Turkey
- Party: Republican People's Party
- Spouse: Mahmut Celalettin (m. 1925; died 1980)
- Children: 2

Salise Abanozoğlu (1904 – 10 October 1983) was a Turkish teacher and politician who served in the Grand National Assembly of Turkey from 1939 until 1946. A member of the Republican People's Party, she represented the Trabzon constituency. While in parliament, Abanozoğlu was a prominent advocate for rural citizens, particularly with regards to education and women.

== Biography ==
Salise Abanozoğlu was born in 1904 in the city of Trabzon, located in northeastern Anatolia. Her parents were Abdülkerim Efendi Bey, who was a doctor and sanitation inspector, and Hafize Asiye Hanım. She received a primary education at the Trabzon and Bursa Malhatun School, and received a teaching degree from the Bursa Teachers' School for Girls. Abanozoğlu began teaching in 1920, working at the Rize Central Girls' School and soon after she became a mathematics teacher at the Trabzon İçkale Girls' Primary School. On 15 September 1925, she married Mahmut Celalettin, a lawyer and government bureaucrat, and retired from teaching.

In the 1939 Turkish general election, Abanozoğlu was elected to the Grand National Assembly, representing Trabzon as a member of the Republican People's Party, which was the sole legal party. She was re-elected in the 1943 election. While in parliament, Abanozoğlu was a member of the Committee on Internal Affairs. In 1940, she gave a speech about "taking the burdens from the shoulders of peasant women", and "citing the heroism of Turkish women during the war". (Note: It is unclear if this refers to World War I or the Turkish War of Independence)

Towards the end of her second term, Abanozoğlu became involved with a popular local movement in Trabzon Province which sought to improve the quality of education in the province's rural districts. In a 1946 report, she noted that there were no secondary schools in the entire province besides in the city of Trabzon. As such, rural students were forced to travel into the city at their own expense if they wished to continue their education; these students were also often not registered with their boarding schools due to a shortage of staff. Her report concluded with several suggestions, including a proposal for the city to open a separate hostel exclusively for rural students. Abanozoğlu left office at the end of her term in June 1946. As of 2022, she is one of only four women to have represented Trabzon in parliament.

Abanozoğlu retired on 23 February 1954 due to disabilities. She died in Ankara on 10 October 1983.
