= Orhan Brandt =

Turkish philatelist

Orhan Brandt (1890 – 22 July 1974) was a Turkish philatelist who was added to the Roll of Distinguished Philatelists in 1958.
