= Aysun Kayacı =

Turkish actress and model (born 1979)

- Born: May 20, 1979 (age 46); Istanbul, Turkey
- Education: Yeditepe University
- Occupations: Actress, presenter, model
- Years active: 1994–2012
- Height: 1.72 m (5 ft 7 1/2 in)
- Spouse: Efe Kapancı (m. 2012)
- Children: 1

Aysun Kayacı (born May 20, 1979) is a former Turkish model, actress and presenter.

== Biography ==
=== Early career ===
Aysun Kayacı started her career at the age of 15, when she appeared as receptionist hostess in commercial fairs and exhibition stands. She focused on modelling until 2005. She received the MGD national award in 2004 as "best Turkish model".

Since 2005, she also started accepting roles in movies and TV shows. She played in the feature film Kısık Ateşte 15 Dakika ("15 Minutes On Low Heat") in 2006, and she appeared in the TV series Zehirli Çiçek ("Poisonous Flower"), Doktorlar ("The Doctors") and Sessiz Gemiler ("Silent ships"), respectively in 2005, 2006 and 2007.

=== 2007: Pepsi Cola commercial ===
Aysun Kayacı's modelling breakthrough came especially with a Pepsi Cola commercial shot in 2007, revolutionary in Turkey by reason of its message charged with eroticism – later toned down – and with its final moments picturing a cast of thousands. The advert's mini-play commences with a nerdy young Turkish male opening his refrigerator to find two cold cans of Pepsi Max. He retrieves them both and tosses one to his equally nerdy young male roommate. First young male pops the top of his can, lifts it to his lips, and upon first taste he finds himself in torrid open-mouthed lip-lock with the very sexily dressed Aysun Kayacı. After a moment of dreamy bliss, the young man comes to his senses, recoils in wide-eyed disbelief, rips the can from his lips and the image of Aysun disappears. He eye-checks his roommate for a similar reaction, but his roommate has not opened his can yet. So he hazards another sip and the same thing happens. After longer blissful moments, he abruptly awakens from his reverie, rips the can from his lips for the second time, and slams it to the kitchen counter which finally gets his roommate's attention. With a meaningful look, he urges his roommate to take a sip from his own can of Pepsi Max, with the same predictable results. The commercial made Aysun Kayacı nationally famous.

=== Recent years ===
Aysun Kayacı played the role of Yağmur in the Turkish police procedural Gece Gunduz ("Night and day").

She also presents a program on NTV named Haydi Gel Bizimle Ol (Come Join Us), where she occasionally causes uproars and finds herself at the center of criticisms and polemics by her remarks.

Aysun Kayacı is currently pursuing her graduate studies in the field of history at Yeditepe University in Istanbul.

== Filmography ==
Cinema
Year	Movie	Role	Notes
2006	Kısık Ateşte 15 Dakika	Yasemin	Leading Role
2008	Şeytanın Pabucu	Aysel	Leading Role
Television
Year	TV series	Role	Notes
1994	Alem Buysa	Aysun	Episode 9
2000	Zehirli Çiçek	Ayşin	Leading Role
2005	Çat Kapı	Buket	Leading Role
2006-2007	Doktorlar	Kader Denizhan	Leading Role
2007	3 Tatlı Cadı	Kader Denizhan	Guest actress
2007	Sessiz Gemiler	İpek	Supporting role
2008	Gece Gündüz	Yağmur/Arzu	Guest Actress (22-29)
2010	Cuma'ya Kalsa	Çiğdem	Leading Role
2011	Artı 18	Selin	Leading Role
Kaynak:
