= Selin Ciğerci =

Turkish Internet celebrity (born 1984)

- Born: 4 April 1984 (age 42); Beykoz, Istanbul, Turkey
- Occupations: Internet celebrity, singer and businessperson
- Spouses: Gökhan Çıra (m. 2019; div. 2021) (m. 2022; div. 2022)
- Children: 1

Selin Ciğerci (born 4 April 1984) is a Turkish transgender Internet celebrity, singer and businessperson. Ciğerci has been working in the field of pop music since mid-2017.

== Early life ==
Selin Ciğerci was born in Istanbul in 1984 to a conservative family. Her father was from Konya and her mother from Kastamonu. The family was poor at first, but her father's ready-made clothing company eventually prospered. She underwent gender-affirming surgery in 2017.

== Career ==
Ciğerci participated in the 4th season of the Turkish version of Wipe Out.

Ciğerci is a singer and social media influencer.

She has her own cosmetic product brand called "Selin Beauty".

== Personal life ==
Ciğerci married football player Gökhan Çıra on 28 October 2019. The couple divorced on 10 September 2021 on the grounds that there were various differences of opinion. On 5 January 2022, it was reported that Selin Ciğerci and Gökhan Çıra were together again, and they remarried on 16 May 2022. The couple, who divorced later in the same year, share a daughter together.
