= Gündüz Gürol Azer =

Turkish footballer (born 1980)

Personal information
- Full name: Gündüz Gürol Azer
- Date of birth: 4 February 1980 (age 46)
- Place of birth: Istanbul, Turkey
- Height: 1.80 m (5 ft 11 in)
- Position: Fullback

Team information
- Current team: Giresunspor

Youth career
- 1999: Galatasaray S.K.

Senior career*
Years	Team	Apps	(Gls)
2000–2001	Galatasaray S.K.	0	(0)
2001–2005	Çaykur Rizespor	96	(2)
2005–2006	Vestel Manisaspor	17	(0)
2006–2007	Sivasspor	6	(0)
2007–2008	Diyarbakirspor		
2008	Kasımpaşa S.K.		
2009—	Giresunspor		

International career^{‡}
1999	Turkey U19	2	(0)
2004	Turkey A2	2	(0)
- * Club domestic league appearances and goals as of 15:30, 15 April 2009 (UTC) ‡ National team caps and goals as of May 6, 2007

Gündüz Gürol Azer (born 4 February 1980) is a Turkish footballer who plays for Giresunspor in the TFF First League.

He previously played fullback for Çaykur Rizespor and Sivasspor in the Süper Lig.
