= 43rd government of Turkey =

Government of the Republic of Turkey (1979-1980)

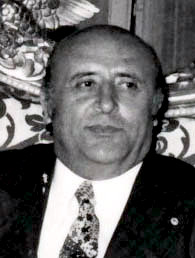
Süleyman Demirel, 1976

The 43rd government of Turkey (12 November 1979 – 12 September 1980), also known as the 6th Demirel Government or the Unwillingly Nationalist Front Government (Kerhen Milliyetçi Cephe Hükûmeti), was a minority government led by Süleyman Demirel of Justice Party (AP).

== The elections ==
The 42nd government of Turkey came to an end because of the defeat of Bülent Ecevit's CHP in by-elections. However, CHP was still the largest party in the parliament, and Süleyman Demirel could not found a coalition government. Instead, he asked for the support of the other parties, which were reluctant to participate in the government. Finally, Necmettin Erbakan of the National Salvation Party agreed to support the minority government of AP.

== The government ==
In the list below, the serving period of cabinet members who served only a part of the cabinet's lifespan are shown in the column "Notes".

Title	Name	Party	Notes
Prime Minister	Süleyman Demirel	AP	
Minister of State	Orhan Eren	AP	
Minister of State	Muhammet Kelleci	AP	12 November 1979 – 15 May 1980
Minister of State	Ekrem Ceyhun	AP	
Minister of State	Ahmet Karahan	AP	
Minister of State	Metin Musaoğlu	AP	
Minister of State	Köksal Toptan	AP	
Ministry of Justice	Ömer Ucuzal	AP	
Ministry of National Defense	Ahmet İhsan Birincioğlu	AP	
Ministry of the Interior	Mustafa Gülcügil; Orhan Eren	AP	12 November 1979 – 21 July 1980; 4 August 1980 – 12 September 1980
Ministry of Foreign Affairs	Hayrettin Erkmen	AP	
Ministry of Finance	İsmet Sezgin	AP	
Ministry of National Education	Orhan Cemal Fersoy	AP	
Ministry of Public Works	Selahattin Kılıç	AP	
Ministry of Commerce	Halil Başol	AP	
Ministry of Health and Social Security	Ali Münif İslamoğlu	AP	
Ministry of Customs and Monopolies	Ahmet Çakmak	AP	
Ministry of Food Agriculture and Husbandry	Cemal Külahlı	AP	
Ministry of Transport	Hüseyin özalp	AP	
Ministry of Labour	Hüseyin Cavit Erdemir	AP	
Ministry of Social Security	Sümer Oral	AP	
Ministry of Industry and Technology	Kemal Bayar	AP	
Ministry of Culture	Tevfik Koraltan	AP	
Ministry of Construction and Settlement	Turgut Toker	AP	
Ministry of Village Affairs and Cooperatives	Ahmet Karayiğit	AP	
Ministry of Forestry	Hasan Ekinci	AP	
Ministry of Youth and Sports	Talat Asal	AP	
Ministry of Tourism	Barlas Küntay	AP	
Ministry of Energy and Natural Resources	Esat Kıratlıoğlu	AP	

== Aftermath ==
The government ended with the 1980 Turkish coup d'état.

Preceded by 42nd government of Turkey (Bülent Ecevit)	43rd Government of Turkey; 12 November 1979 – 11 September 1980	Succeeded by 44th government of Turkey (Bülent Ulusu)
