= Hakan Haslaman =

Turkish stuntman and film producer

Hakan Haslaman (born August 27, 1974) is a Turkish stuntman, who also works as director and film producer.

He has helped introduce Asian stunt techniques in Europe. He also wrote a stunt textbook.

Haslaman is the founder of the Turkish martial art Amarok (Az Rak Oguz Alpagutnung Mengu Köresi).
