= Serkan Yalçın =

Turkish footballer

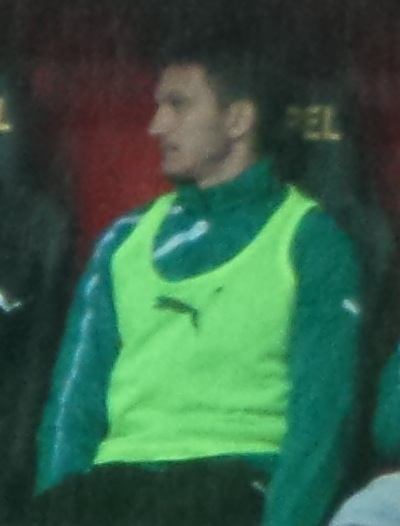
- Serkan Yalçın in 2014.

Personal information
- Date of birth: 2 November 1982 (age 44)
- Place of birth: İzmir, Turkey
- Height: 1.83 m (6 ft 0 in)
- Position: Defender

Senior career*
Years	Team	Apps	(Gls)
1999–2001	Torbalıspor		
2001–2002	Aliağaspor		
2002–2005	Ulucak Spor		
2005–2006	Akhisar Belediyespor	4	(0)
2006–2008	Torbalıspor	27	(1)
2008–2009	Altınordu	18	(1)
2009–2014	Akhisar Belediyespor	89	(1)
2014–2015	Boluspor	29	(2)
2015–2016	Sarıyer	22	(2)
2016–2017	Nazilli Belediyespor	6	(0)
2017–2018	Sarıyer	32	(2)
2019–2020	Torbalıspor		
- * Club domestic league appearances and goals

Serkan Yalçın (born 2 November 1982) is a Turkish former professional footballer who played as a defender.
