= Assassination of Orhan Gündüz =

1982 murder in Somerville, Massachusetts, US

- Location: Somerville, Massachusetts, U.S.
- Date: May 4, 1982
- Target: Orhan Gündüz
- Attack type: Assassination
- Weapons: 9mm semiautomatic pistol.357 magnum revolver
- Deaths: Orhan Gündüz
- Perpetrator: Justice Commandos of the Armenian Genocide
- Motive: Retaliation for the Armenian genocide

The assassination of Orhan Gündüz, Turkish businessman and diplomat, took place on May 4, 1982, in Somerville, Massachusetts, United States.

An Armenian gunman attacked and killed Orhan Gündüz, a Turkish honorary consul, while he waited in his automobile in rush-hour traffic near Union Square, Somerville. The gunman escaped. Justice Commandos of the Armenian Genocide (JCAG) claimed responsibility.

The assassination occurred six weeks after Gündüz was wounded in a bomb attack at his Central Square, Cambridge gift shop, Topkapi Imports, on March 22, before which JCAG threatened that Gündüz either resign as an honorary consul or be executed. Salespersons at Topkapi Imports commented that neither the store nor Gündüz had been given police protection despite the fact that the store had been the site of the prior bombing. There was, however, a significant police presence in the area of the store at all hours as it was on the same street as the Cambridge Police headquarters and about 150 feet away.

To help solve Gündüz's murder, local television and newspapers utilized a composite drawing based on information provided by a witness in order to apprehend the assassin. When the witness was subsequently gunned down, all community efforts to help apprehend the assassin came to a halt. The Somerville Police Department and FBI were never able to apprehend the assassin.

== See also ==
- List of homicides in Massachusetts
