= Cevat Yurdakul =

Turkish lawyer and chief of police

- Born: 1 January 1942
- Died: 28 September 1979 (aged 37); Adana
- Occupation: Lawyer (prosecutor)
- Known for: 1979 murder

Cevat Yurdakul (1 January 1942 – 28 September 1979) was a prosecutor and the chief of police of Adana Province, Turkey, when he was assassinated in 1979. Yurdakul was killed as a result of an armed attack prior to the 12 September coup.

== Background ==
Yurdakul was a member of the Pol-Der who called them 'People's Policemen', and as soon as he started his work, murders went out targeting certain people. Yurdakul was appointed as Adana Provincial Police Director by the Ecevit government.

== Death and aftermath ==
On the morning of 28 September 1979, Yurdakul was shot and killed by a bullet in the city of Adana by Abdurrahman Kıpçak and Muhsin Kehya. Halil Güllüoğlu, the lawyer of the Yurdakul family, was also killed on 6 February 1980. Muhsin Kehya broke out of prison a couple of times, then fled to Germany. In 1997, Kehya was returned to Turkey by the German government with the condition of no death penalty. Then he was sentenced to 36 years of jail time. Finally, he was released from prison in 2012 as a result of legal arrangements made by the AKP Government. The other culprit, Kıpçak also broke out of prison after the killing and fled abroad. In 1989, he was caught with 47 kilos of heroin in Istanbul, then again released from prison after some time. Finally, he was killed as a result of an armed assault in Istanbul, in 2006.

Halil İbrahim Altınışık, Kadir Akgöllü, Mustafa Gülnar, and Yücel Yirik have also faced trials after the murder as suspects. Varying and conflicting sources are present about the murder and who was responsible for it; including allegations that the leader of MHP at the time, Alparslan Türkeş was the one who gave the order, have not been confirmed.

== See also ==
- List of unsolved murders (1900–1979)
