= 44th government of Turkey =

Government of the Republic of Turkey (1980–1983)

The 44th government of Turkey (20 September 1980 – 13 December 1983) was a technocratic government in the history of Turkey.

== The elections ==
The 43rd government of Turkey came to an end because of the 1980 Turkish coup d'état. Parliament was dismissed and a technocratic government was formed. The prime minister was Bülent Ulusu, a retired admiral and the ex-commander of the Turkish navy, but the majority of the ministers were civilian technocrats.

== The government ==
In the list below, the serving period of cabinet members who served only a part of the cabinet's lifespan are shown in the column "Notes".

Title	Name	Tenure
Prime Minister	Bülent Ulusu	
Deputy Prime Minister	Zeyyat Baykara	
Deputy Prime Minister	Turgut Özal	20 September 1980 – 14 July 1982
Minister of State	İlhan Öztrak	
Minister of State	Mehmet özgüneş	
Minister of State	Nimet Özdaş	
Minister of State	Sermet Refik Pasin	14 July 1982 – 13 December 1983
Ministry of Justice	Cevdet Mentaş; Rifat Bayazıt; Kazım Akdoğan	20 September 1980 – 8 February 1983; 15 February 1983 – 13 May 1983; 21 May 1983 – 13 December 1983
Ministry of National Defense	Ümit Haluk Bayülken	
Ministry of the Interior	Selahattin Çetiner	
Ministry of Foreign Affairs	İlter Türkmen	
Ministry of Finance	Kaya Erdem; Adnan Başer Kafaoğlu	20 September 1980 – 14 July 1982; 14 July 1982 – 13 December 1983
Ministry of National Education	Hasan Sağlam	
Ministry of Public Works	Tahsin Önalp	
Ministry of Commerce	Kemal Cantürk	
Ministry of Health and Social Security	Necmi Ayanoğlu; Kaya Kılıçturgay	20 September 1980 – 23 December 1981; 23 December 1981 – 13 December 1983
Ministry of Customs and Monopolies	Recai Baturalp; Ali Bozer; Cafer Tayyar Sadıklar	20 September 1980 – 23 December 1981; 23 December 1981 – 13 May 1983; 21 May 1983 – 13 December 1983
Ministry of Food and Forestry	Sabahattin Özbek	
Ministry of Transport	Necmi Özgür; Mustafa Aysan	20 September 1980 – 2 March 1982; 2 March 1982 – 13 December 1983
Ministry of Labour	Turhan Esener	
Ministry of Industry and Technology	Şahap Kocatopçu; Mehmet Turgut	20 September 1980 – 21 December 1981; 21 December 1981 – 13 December 1983
Ministry of Culture	Cihat Baban	20 September – 13 December 1981
Ministry of Construction and Settlement	Şerif Tüten; Ahmet Samsunlu	20 September 1980 – 14 July 1982; 14 July 1982 – 13 December 1983
Ministry of Village Affairs and Cooperatives	Raif Güney	
Ministry of Youth and Sports	Vecdi Gönül	
Ministry of Tourism	İlhan Evliyaoğlu	After 10 December 1981, renamed the Ministry of Culture and Tourism
Ministry of Energy and Natural Resources	Serbülent Bingöl; Fahir İlkel	20 September 1980 – 23 December 1981; 23 December 1981 – 13 December 1983

== Aftermath ==
The government ended with the elections held on 6 November 1983.

Preceded by 43rd government of Turkey (Süleyman Demirel)	44th Government of Turkey; 20 September 1980 – 13 December 1983	Succeeded by 45th government of Turkey (Turgut Özal)
