= Bülend Ulusu =

Prime Minister of Turkey from 1980 to 1983

18th Prime Minister of Turkey
- In office 21 September 1980 – 13 December 1983
- President: Kenan Evren
- Deputy: Zeyyat Baykara; Turgut Özal
- Preceded by: Süleyman Demirel
- Succeeded by: Turgut Özal

Personal details
- Born: 1 July 1923 Üsküdar, Constantinople, Ottoman Empire
- Died: 23 December 2015 (aged 92) Şişli, Istanbul, Turkey
- Party: Independent
- Education: Turkish Naval Academy

Saim Bülend Ulusu (1 July 1923 – 23 December 2015) was a Turkish admiral who was Prime Minister of Turkey from the time of the 1980 military coup to the time that elections were allowed in 1983.

== Biography ==
Ulusu graduated from the Turkish Naval Academy on 15 October 1940 with the rank of a Sub-Lieutenant.

He attained the highest possible rank as admiral in 1974, and retired from the military in 1980 as the Commander of the Navy, he was appointed in 1977. As a prime minister he advocated for a closer relationship between Turkey and NATO as well as the member states of the Council of Europe.

Ulusu died on 23 December 2015, aged 92.

== Political career ==
After 1980 coup d'état, Ulusu was named as Prime Minister of Turkey by military authorities. His cabinet remained in office until the 1983 elections.

Military offices
Preceded by Hilmi Fırat	Commander of the Turkish Naval Forces; 9 August 1977–10 August 1980	Succeeded by Nejat Tümer
Political offices
Preceded by Süleyman Demirel	Prime Minister of Turkey; 21 September 1980–13 December 1983	Succeeded by Turgut Özal
