= 1965 in Turkey =

- Centuries: 20th; 21st
- Decades: 1940s; 1950s; 1960s; 1970s; 1980s
- See also: List of years in Turkey

Events in the year 1965 in Turkey.

== Parliament ==
- 12th Parliament of Turkey (up to 10 October)
- 13th Parliament of Turkey

== Incumbents ==
- President – Cemal Gürsel
- Prime Minister

İsmet İnönü (up to 20 February)
Suat Hayri Ürgüplü (20 February-27 October)
Süleyman Demirel (from 27 October)

- Leader of the opposition

Süleyman Demirel (up to 20 February)
İsmet İnönü (from 20 February)

== Ruling party and the main opposition ==
- Ruling party

Republican People's Party (CHP) (up to 20 February)
A coalition of Justice Party (AP), New Turkey Party (YTP) and Republican Villagers Nation Party (CKMP) and Nation Party (MP) (20 February-27 October)
Justice Party (AP) (from 27 October)

- Main opposition

Justice Party (AP) (up to 20 February)
Republican People's Party (CHP) (from 20 February)

== Cabinet ==
- 28th government of Turkey (up to 20 February)
- 29th government of Turkey (20 February-27 October)
- 30th government of Turkey (from 27 October)

== Events ==
- 13 February – Annual budget of the 28th government of Turkey was rejected. (End of İsmet İnönü government and a short-term caretaker government)
- 19 March – Gas explosion in Yeniçeltek mine, Amasya Province. 69 deaths
- 13 June – Fenerbahçe won the championship of Turkish football league.
- 1 July - Road Water Electricity General Directorate was founded.
- 11 August - The Hendek bus accident occurred, causing 25 deaths.
- 10 October – General elections . AP 240 seats, CHP 134 seats, MP 31 seats, YTP 19 seats, TİP 14 seats, CKMP 11 seats, Indep 1 seat. (TİP was the first marxist party to gain seats in Turkish parliament)
- 24 October – Census Population 31351421.
- 10 November – The Uşak Atatürk Monument is erected.
- 18 December – Turkey declared that Zürich and London Agreement concerning the Cyprus issue was still in effect

== Births ==
- 24 February – Tülay Keçialan (Asya), singer
- 5 April – Aykut Kocaman footballer
- 18 August – Hayrünnisa Gül, former President Abdullah Gül's wife
- 12 September – Seden Gürel, singer
- 2 October – Ferhan and Ferzan Önder sisters, pianists

== Deaths ==
- 9 March – Burhânettin Deran (aged c. 63), composer and qanun performer
- 18 July – Refik Halit Karay (aged 77), novelist
- 15 August – Zihni Derin (aged 85), agronomist

== Gallery ==
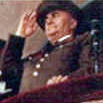
Cemal Gürsel

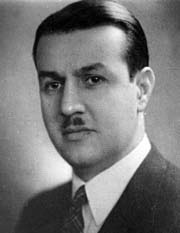
Suat Hayri Ürgüplü

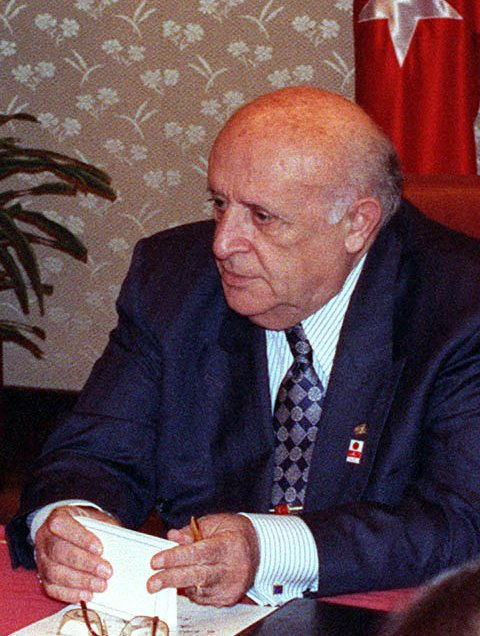
Süleyman Demirel

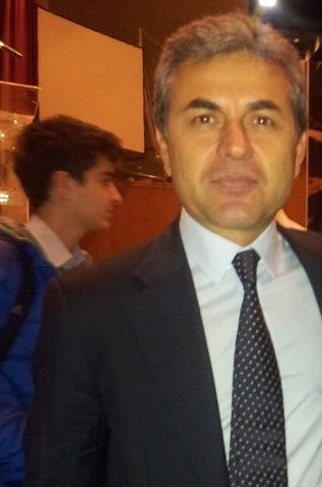
Aykut Kocaman

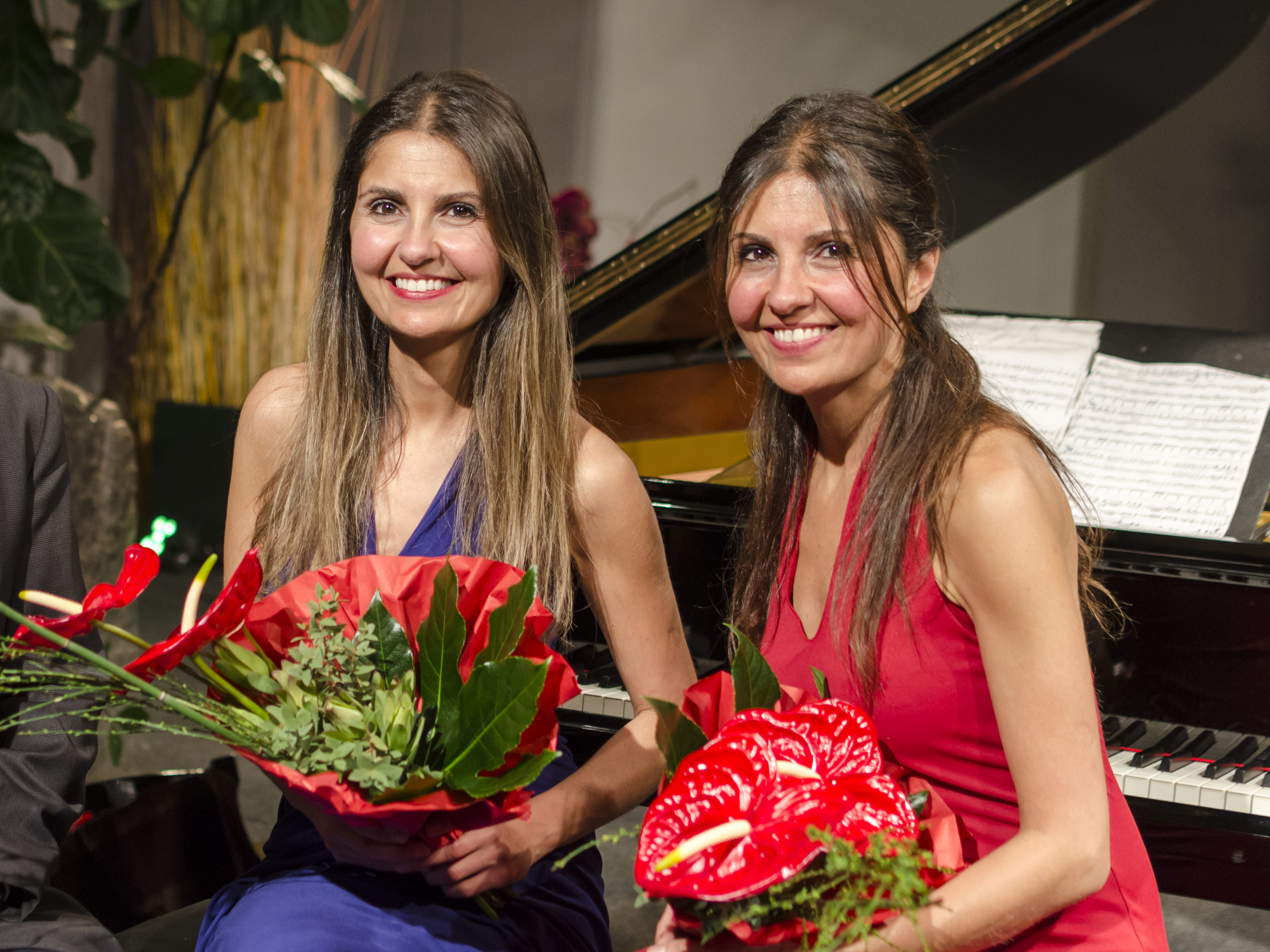
Ferhan & Ferzan Önder

== See also ==
- 1964–65 1.Lig
