= 1963 in Turkey =

- Centuries: 20th; 21st
- Decades: 1940s; 1950s; 1960s; 1970s; 1980s
- See also: List of years in Turkey

Events in the year 1963 in Turkey.

== Parliament ==
- 12th Parliament of Turkey

== Incumbents ==
- President – Cemal Gürsel
- Prime Minister – İsmet İnönü
- Leader of the opposition – Ragıp Gümüşpala

== Ruling party and the main opposition ==
- Ruling party – Republican People's Party (CHP) (with coalition partners New Turkey Party (YTP) and Republican Villagers Nation Party (CKMP) up to 25 December, and then with the Independents)
- Main opposition – Justice Party (AP)

== Cabinet ==
- 27th government of Turkey (up to 25 December)
- 28th government of Turkey (from 25 December)

== Events ==
- 1 February – Two airplanes collided over Ankara. 87 deaths
- 27 March – Demonstrations against Justice Party (AP)
- 21 May – Attempted coup by Talat Aydemir.
- 26 June – Galatasaray won the championship of Turkish football league.
- 12 September – Ankara Agreement between the European Union and Turkey
- 17 November – Local elections
- 27 November – After the prime minister İsmet İnönü went to United States to attend the funeral of John F. Kennedy, New Turkey Party a coalition partner withdrew from the government. This ended the 27th government.
- 23 December – Bloody Christmas in Cyprus where Turkish villages were attacked
- 24 December – Turkish military planes flew over Cyprus as a warning (without any action)

== Births ==
- 1 January -Fatih Altaylı, journalist
- 2 February – Rıza Çalımbay, footballer and manager
- 10 February – Candan Erçetin, singer
- 1 March – Aydan Şener, actress
- 14 August – Yaprak Özdemiroğlu, ballet dancer and actress
- 16 September -Yonca Evcimik, singer and actress
- 10 October – Hülya Avşar, model and actress
- 10 November – Tanju Çolak, footballer
- 29 November – Emine Ülker Tarhan, politician, lawyer

== Deaths ==
- 3 May Abdülhak Şinasi Hisar (aged 76), novelist
- 2 October – Refet Bele (aged 82), retired general who participated in the Turkish War of Independence
- 3 June Nazım Hikmet (aged 61), poet
- 31 October Mesut Cemil (aged 61), musician

== Gallery ==
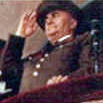
Cemal Gürsel

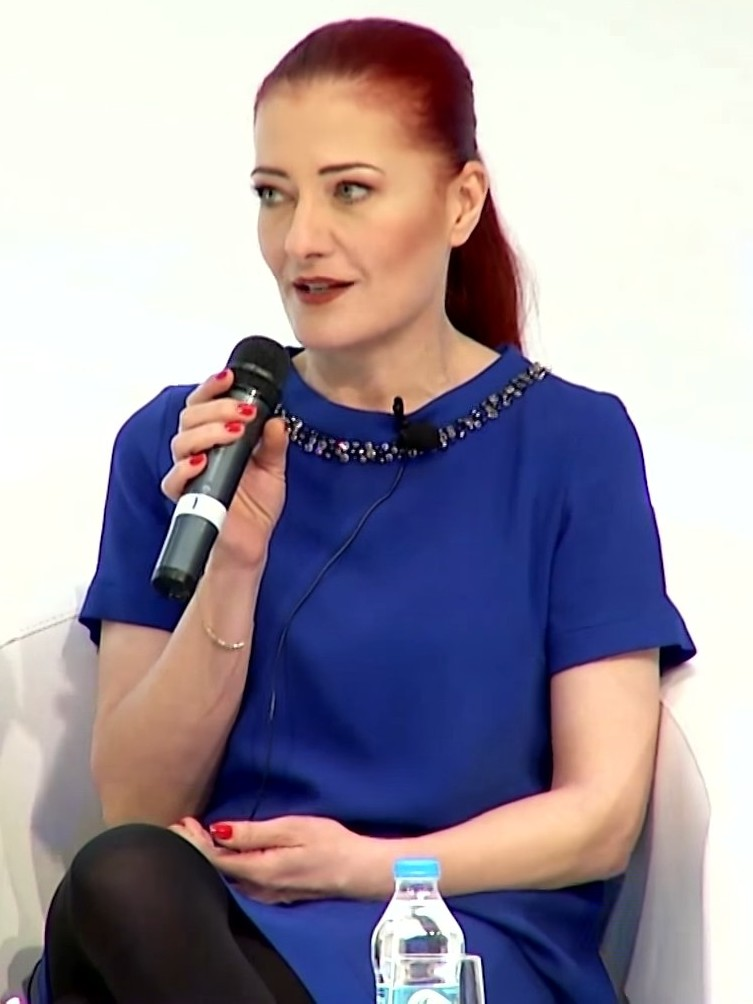
Candan Erçetin

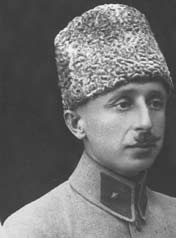
Refet Bele

== See also ==
- 1962–63 Milli Lig
