= 1962 in Turkey =

- Centuries: 20th; 21st
- Decades: 1940s; 1950s; 1960s; 1970s; 1980s
- See also: List of years in Turkey

Events in the year 1962 in Turkey.

== Parliament ==
- 12th Parliament of Turkey

== Incumbents ==
- President – Cemal Gürsel
- Prime Minister – İsmet İnönü
- Leader of the opposition

Ekrem Alican (up to 25 June)
Ragıp Gümüşpala (from 25 June)

== Ruling party and the main opposition ==
- Ruling party – Republican People's Party (CHP) (up to 25 June with Justice Party (AP), and then with New Turkey Party (YTP) and Republican Villagers Nation Party (CKMP)
- Main opposition

New Turkey Party (YTP) (up to 25 June)
Justice Party (AP) (from 25 June)

== Cabinet ==
- 26th government of Turkey (up to 25 June)
- 27th government of Turkey (from 25 June)

== Events ==
- 22 February – Coup attempt led by Colonel Talat Aydemir fails.
- 22 May – Crisis in the government concerning amnesty law
- 27 May – First Nuclear (test) reactor of Turkey in Küçükçekmece, a suburb of Istanbul
- 15 June – When most of CKMP members voted to participate in the new government, Osman Bölükbaşı, the chairman of the Party, resigns and founds another party Nation Party (MP)
- 16 June – Galatasaray won the championship of Turkish football league.
- 26 August – U.S. vice president Lyndon B. Johnson visits Turkey.

== Births ==
- 20 February – Hatice Aslan, theatre actress
- 3 April – Taner Yıldız, politician
- 7 July – Sırrı Süreyya Önder, film director and politician
- 12 September – Sunay Akın, journalist and TV host
- 14 September Nihat Ergün, politician

== Deaths ==
- 24 January – Ahmet Hamdi Tanpınar (aged 61), novelist
- 22 March – Hüsrev Gerede (aged 78), retired officier, diplomat and politician
- 27 August – Reşit Süreyya Gürsey (aged 73), MD, scientist and poet
- 14 September – Fuat Bulca (aged 81), retired officer and politician

== Gallery ==
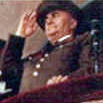
Cemal Gürsel

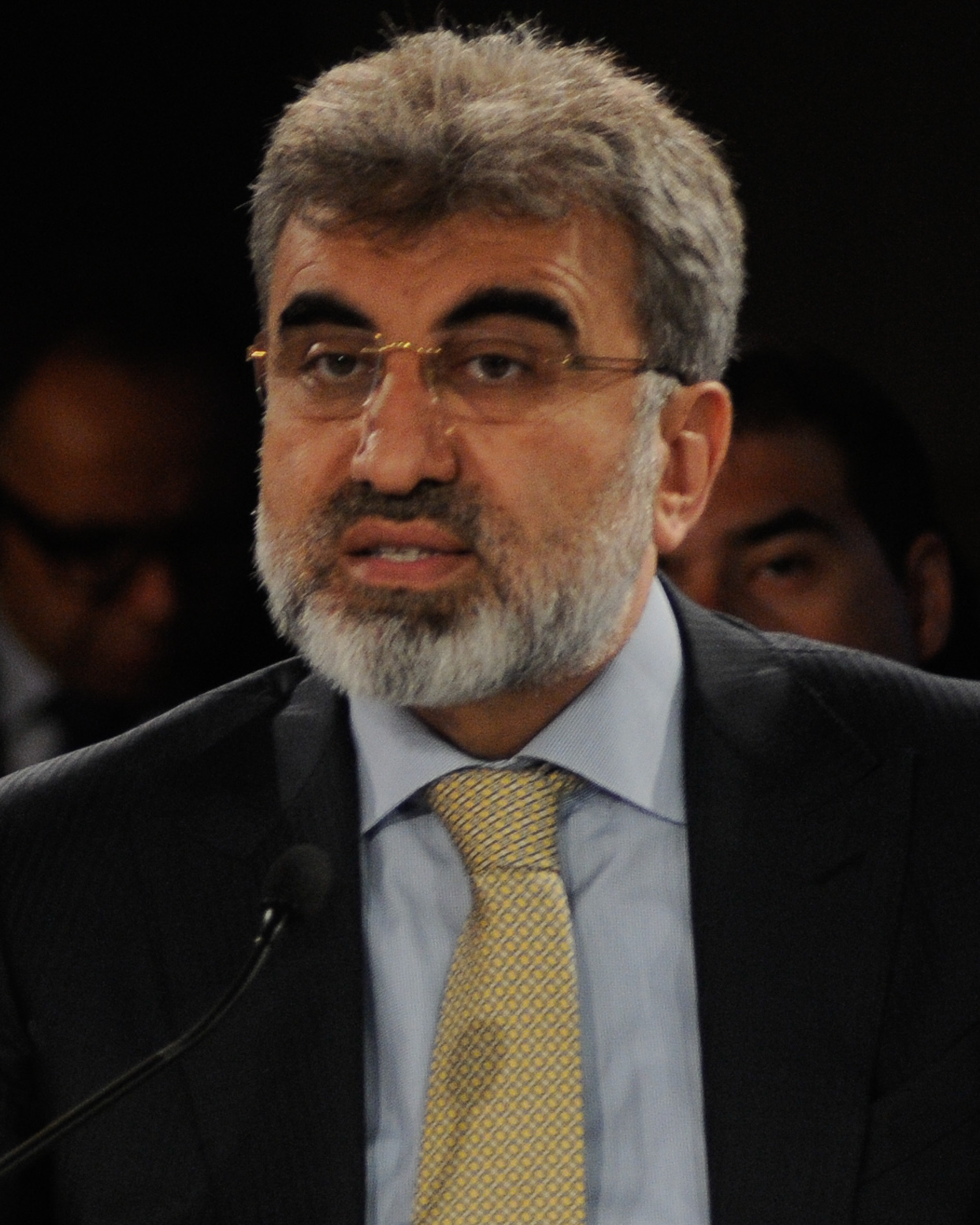
Taner Yıldız

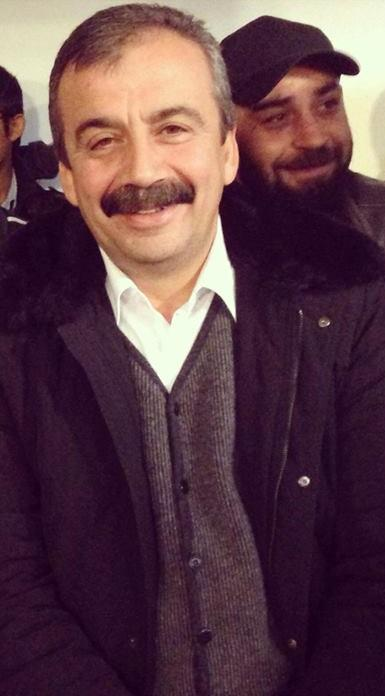
Sırrı Süreyya Önder

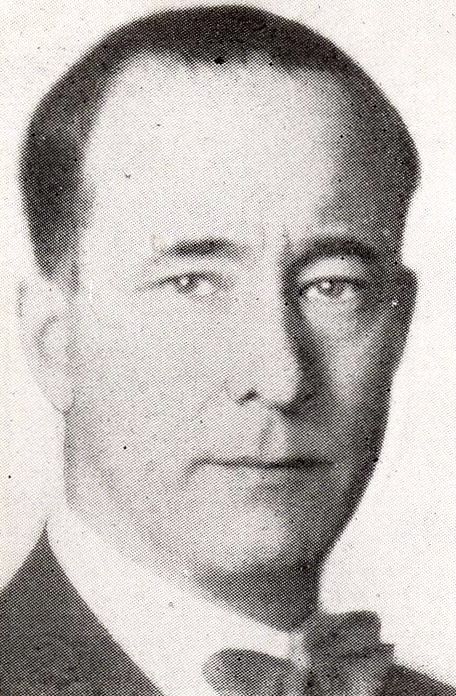
Hüsrev Gerede

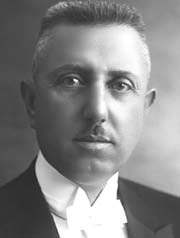
Fuat Bulca

== See also ==
- 1961–62 Milli Lig
