= 1961 in Turkey =

- Centuries: 20th; 21st
- Decades: 1940s; 1950s; 1960s; 1970s; 1980s
- See also: List of years in Turkey

Events in the year 1961 in Turkey.

== Parliament ==
- 12th Parliament of Turkey (from 6 January)

== Incumbents ==
- President – Cemal Gürsel
- Prime Minister

Cemal Gürsel (up to 26 October)
Fahri Özdilek, acting (26 October – 20 November)
İsmet İnönü (from 20 November)

- Leader of the opposition – Ekrem Alican (from 12 November)

== Ruling party and the main opposition ==
- Ruling party – Republican People's Party (CHP) and coalition partner (Justice Party (AP)) (from 20 November)
- Main opposition – New Turkey Party (YTP) (from 20 November)

== Cabinet ==
- 24th government of Turkey (up to 5 January)
- 25th government of Turkey (5 January – 20 November)
- 26th government of Turkey (from 20 November)

== Events ==
- 6 January – constituent assembly
- 1 April – The ban on political activities was lifted
- 3 June – Fenerbahçe won the championship of Turkish football league.
- 9 July – Referendum on the new Turkish constitution (65% approved)
- 15 September – Verdicts (on the Democrat Party (DP) members) pronounced
- 16/17 September – Executions of Prime Minister Adnan Menderes, Minister of Foreign Affairs Fatin Rüştü Zorlu and Minister of Finance Hasan Polatkan
- 15 October – General elections (CHP 173 seats, AP 158 seats, YTP 65 seats, CKMP 54 seats)
- 26 October – Cemal Gürsel was elected as the new president. Fahri Özdilek was appointed as the acting prime minister.
- 20 November - Civilian government

== Births ==
- 1 January – Edibe Sözen, politician
- 31 January – Fatih Kısaparmak, singer and songwriter
- 3 May – Leyla Zana, politician
- 15 June – Gülten Kışanak, politician
- 1 July – Birgül Ayman Güler, politician
- 19 July – Metin Kaya, Turkish-born German politician
- 17 December – Ersun Yanal, football coach

== Deaths ==
- 8 January – Yaşar Doğu (aged 48), wrestler
- 26 February – Hasan Ali Yücel (aged 64), writer and former minister of National education
- 16 June – Peyami Safa (aged 62), writer and journalist
- 16 September – Hasan Polatkan (aged 46), former minister of Finance
- 16 September – Fatin Rüştü Zorlu (aged 51), former minister of Foreign Affairs
- 17 September – Adnan Menderes (aged 62), former prime minister (19th, 20th, 21st, 22nd, and 23rd government of Turkey)
- 19 September – Şemsettin Günaltay (aged 78), former prime minister (1940s)

== Gallery ==
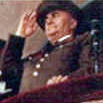
Cemal Gürsel

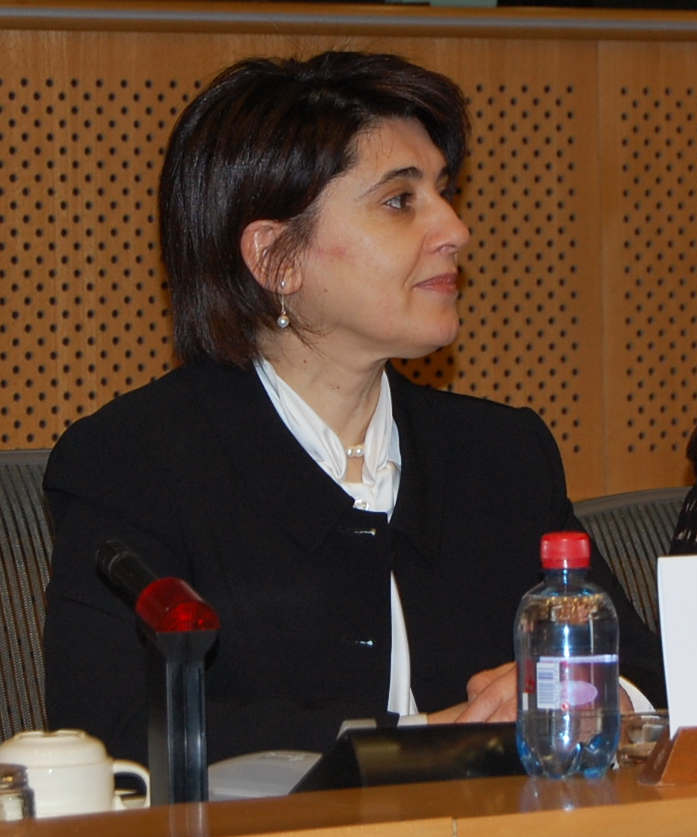
Leyla Zana

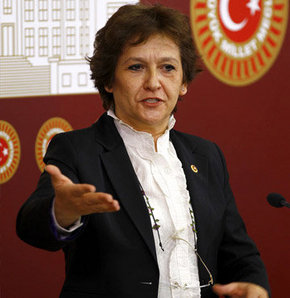
Birgül Ayman Güler

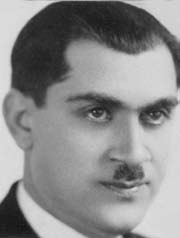
Hasan Ali Yücel

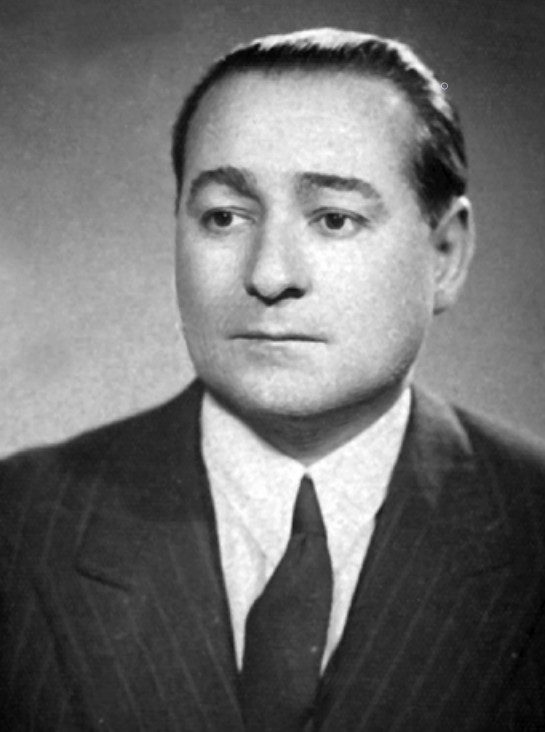
Adnan Menderes

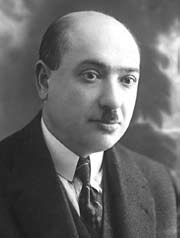
Şemsettin Günaltay

== See also ==
- 1960–61 Milli Lig
