= 1964 in Turkey =

- Centuries: 20th; 21st
- Decades: 1940s; 1950s; 1960s; 1970s; 1980s
- See also: List of years in Turkey

Events in the year 1964 in Turkey.

== Parliament ==
- 12th Parliament of Turkey

== Incumbents ==
- President – Cemal Gürsel
- Prime Minister – İsmet İnönü
- Leader of the opposition

Ragıp Gümüşpala (up to 5 June)
Sadettin Bilgiç (acting, 5 June-29 November)
Süleyman Demirel (from 29 November)

== Ruling party and the main opposition ==
- Ruling party – Republican People's Party (CHP) with Independents
- Main opposition – Justice Party (AP)

== Cabinet ==
- 28th government of Turkey

== Events ==
- 15 January – 31 January London Conference over the issue Cyprus (no consensus)
- 16 March – The government was authorized by the parliament for intervention to Cyprus.
- 16 March – Turkey unilaterally denounced the Greek-Turkish Convention of Establishment, Commerce and Navigation of 1930, marking the beginning of a mass expulsion of the Greek populace.
- 31 May – Fenerbahçe won the championship of Turkish football league.
- 4 June – US president Lyndon Johnson’s letter to İsmet İnönü concerning Cyprus issue (the content of the letter was revealed on 16 January 1966)
- 7 June – Senate 1/3 by elections
- 8 August – After Greek forces attacked Turkish positions in St Hilarion heights in Cyprus, Turkish air forces bombed Greek positions
- 6 October - 1964 Manyas earthquake
- 29 November – Süleyman Demirel was elected as the chairman of the Justice Party (AP)
- 1 December – According to the Ankara Agreement, preparatory term for European Union membership began.

== Births ==
- 23 March – Okan Bayülgen, showman and actor
- 6 July – Sadullah Ergin, former government minister
- 22 September – Hasan Basri Güzeloğlu, Vali (governor)
- 7 October – Yavuz Bingöl, singer
- 10 October – Suat Atalık, chess player
- 14 October – Neşe Erberk, model, business women
- 21 October – Levent Yüksel, singer
- 12 November – Semih Saygıner, professional carom billiards player
- 4 December – Sertap Erener, singer

== Deaths ==
- 9 January – Halide Edib Adıvar (aged 80), novelist and a leader of Turkish women’s rights
- 3 June – Kazım Orbay (aged 60) retired general who participated in the Turkish War of Independence
- 5 June – Ragıp Gümüşpala (aged 67,) chairman of the Justice Party (AP)
- 16 July – Rauf Orbay (aged 83), a former prime minister of the provisional Government of the Grand National Assembly
- 25 November – Naci Tınaz (aged 82), retired general who participated in the Turkish War of Independence

== Gallery ==
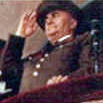
Cemal Gürsel

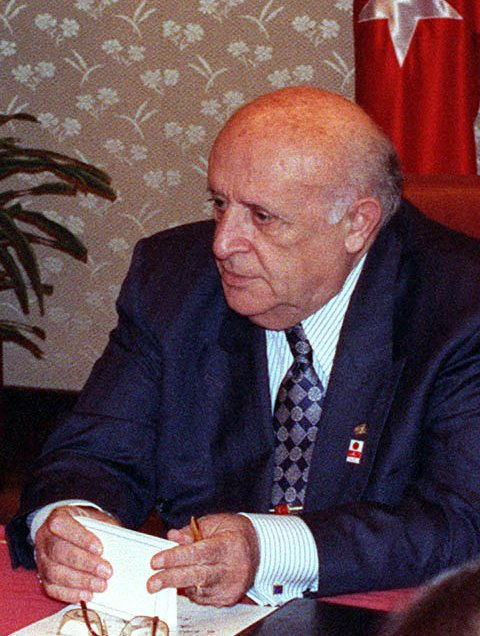
Süleyman Demirel

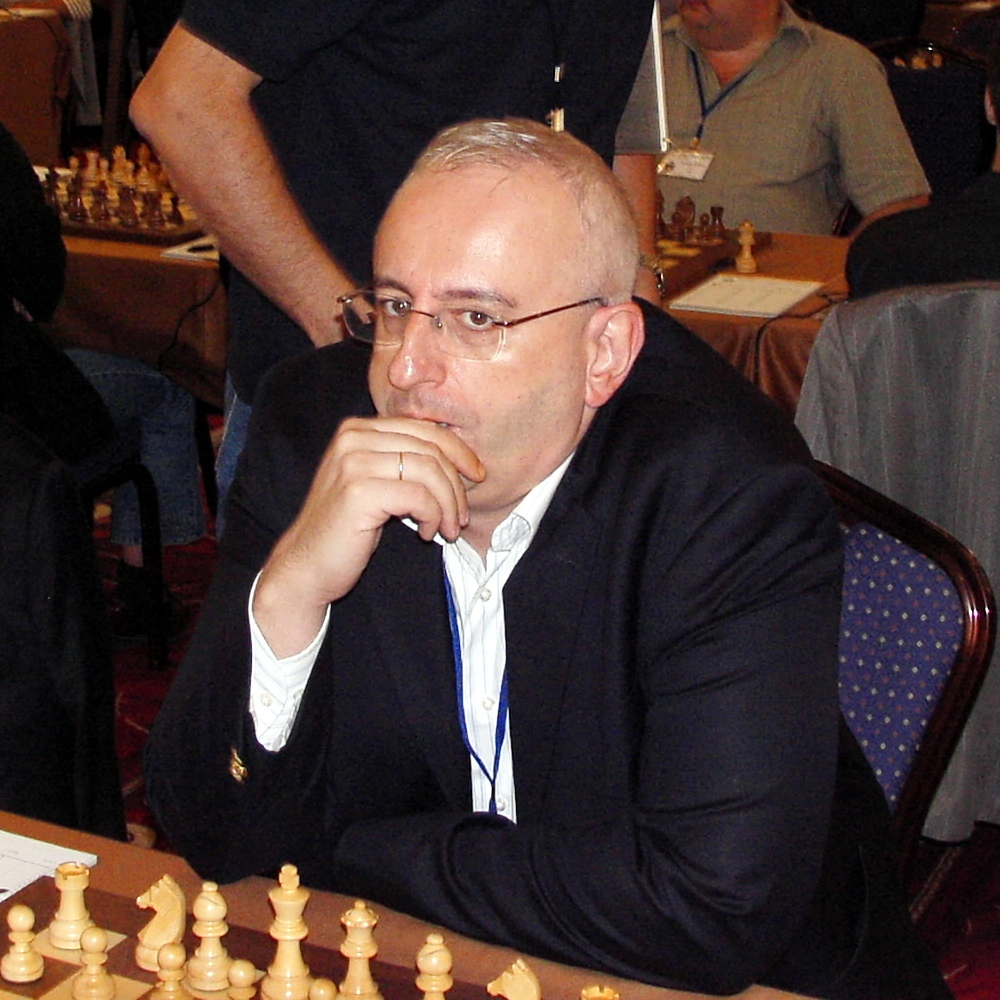
Suat Atalık

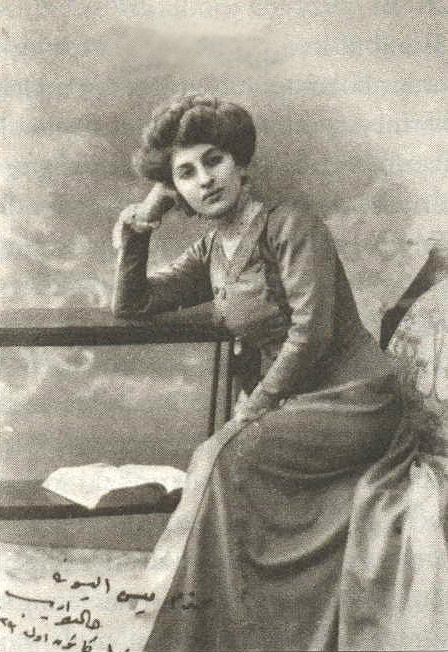
Halide Edib Adıvar

Kazım Orbay

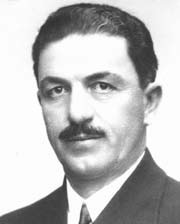
Rauf Orbay

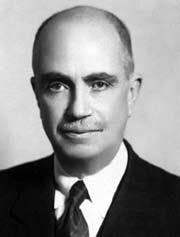
Naci Tınaz

== See also ==
- 1963–64 1.Lig
- Turkey at the 1964 Summer Olympics
- Turkey at the 1964 Winter Olympics
