= 1967 in Turkey =

- Centuries: 20th; 21st
- Decades: 1940s; 1950s; 1960s; 1970s; 1980s
- See also: List of years in Turkey

Events in the year 1967 in Turkey.

== Parliament ==
- 13th Parliament of Turkey

== Incumbents ==
- President – Cevdet Sunay
- Prime Minister – Süleyman Demirel
- Leader of the opposition – İsmet İnönü

== Ruling party and the main opposition ==
- Ruling party – Justice Party (AP)
- Main opposition – Republican People's Party (CHP)

== Cabinet ==
- 30th government of Turkey

== Events ==
- 3 January – Anadol, the first Turkish made car
- 30 April – Reliance Party formed.
- 12 May – Reliance Party was founded by Turhan Feyzioğlu
- 4 June – Beşiktaş won the championship of Turkish football league
- 22 July – The 7.1 M_{s} Mudurnu earthquake affected the Bolu Province with high intensity shaking, killing 86.
- 27 July – Earthquake in Pülümür (about 1000 km east of the 22 July earthquake)
- 13 September – An agreement about transporting a group of Turks living in the island Adakale in Romania.
- 17 September – More than 40 people died during a fight after the football match between Kayserispor and Sivasspor.
- 31 October – Turkish Cypriot leader Rauf Denktaş was arrested by the Greek Cypriots
- 18 November – Following Greek attacks to Turkish villages in Cyprus Turkish air raids to Greek forces.
- 29 November – Turkey and Greece agreed on a plan to halt the hostilities
- 29 December – Turks in Cyprus formed their own government

== Birth ==
- 1 January – Mehmet Şimşek, government minister
- 27 February – Volkan Konak, singer (died 2025)
- 4 April – Ali Babacan, deputy prime minister
- 4 November – Yılmaz Erdoğan, filmmaker
- 20 November – Teoman Yakupoğlu, singer

=== Undated ===
- Murat Günel, Turkish medical scientist

== Deaths ==
- 2 February – Nedim Ökmen (born 1908), economist and politician
- 9 March – Vâlâ Nureddin (born 1901), poet and columnist
- 11 March – Yusuf Ziya Ortaç (born 1895), humorist and publisher
- 17 April – Ali Fuat Başgil (born 1893), academic and politician
- 17 May – Nurullah Ataç (born 1898), essayist and literary critic
- 30 June – Yavuz Abadan (born 1905), academic
- 20 July – Fikret Mualla Saygı (born 1904), painter
- 23 July – Ahmet Kutsi Tecer (born 1901), poet and politician
- 5 August – Mustafa İnan (born 1911), academic and civil engineer
- 13 September – Şerif Muhiddin Targan (born 1892), musician

== Gallery ==
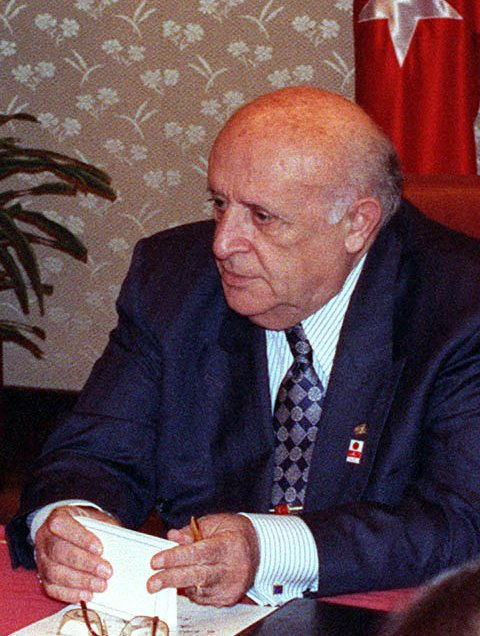
Süleyman Demirel

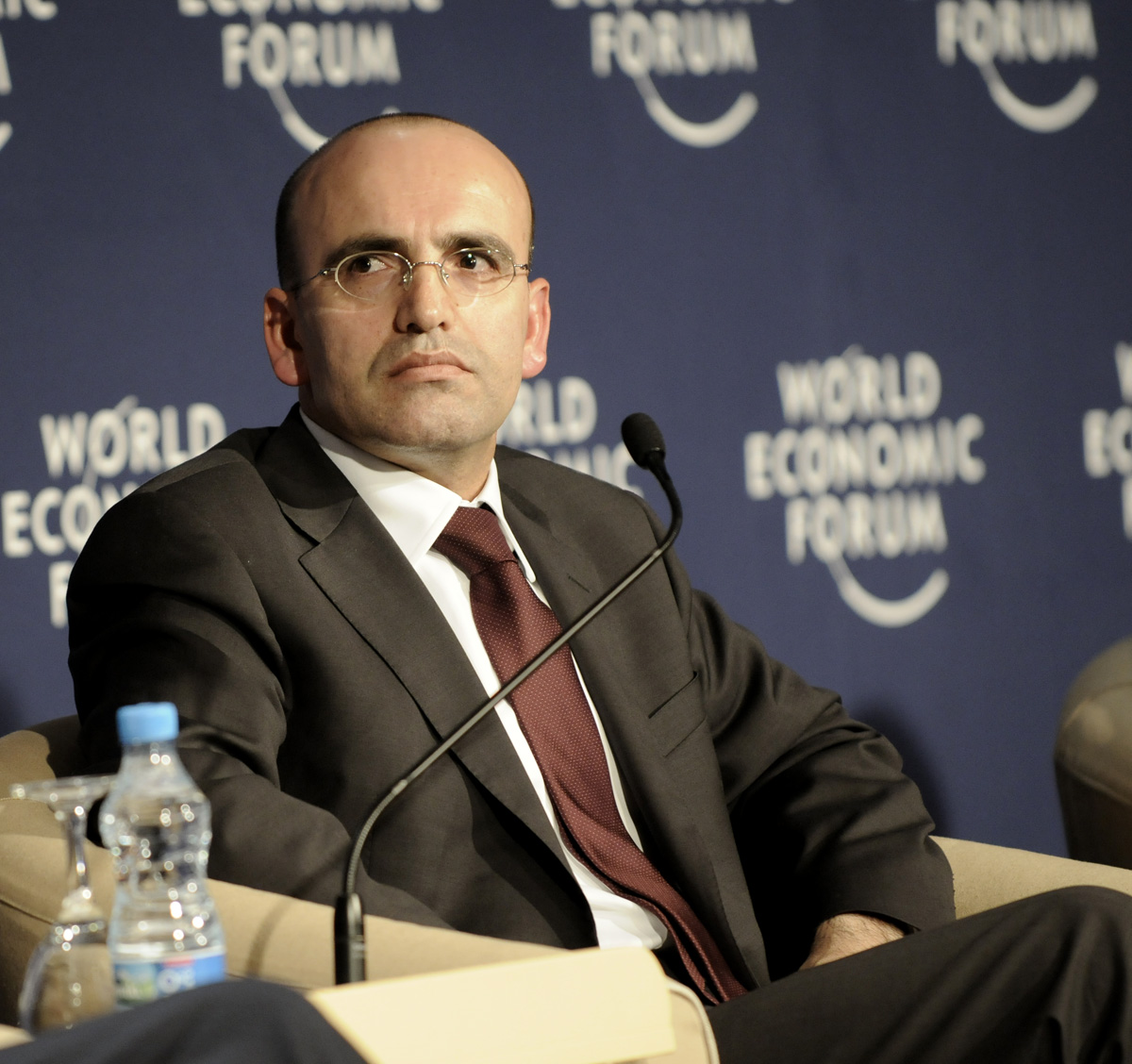
Mehmet Şimşek

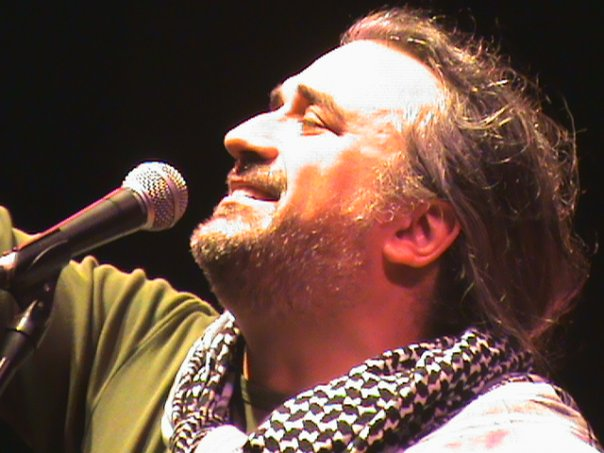
Volkan Konak

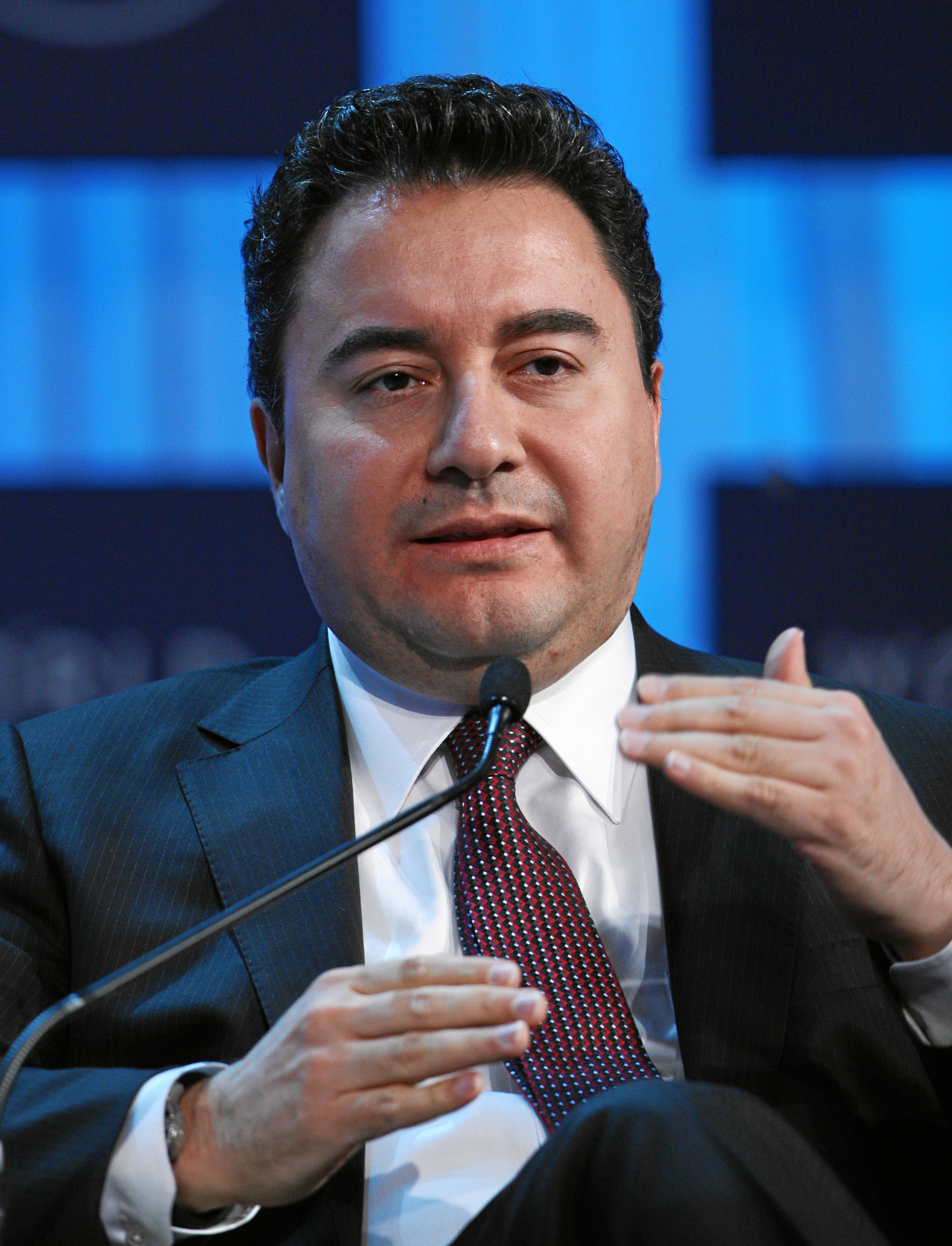
Ali Babacan

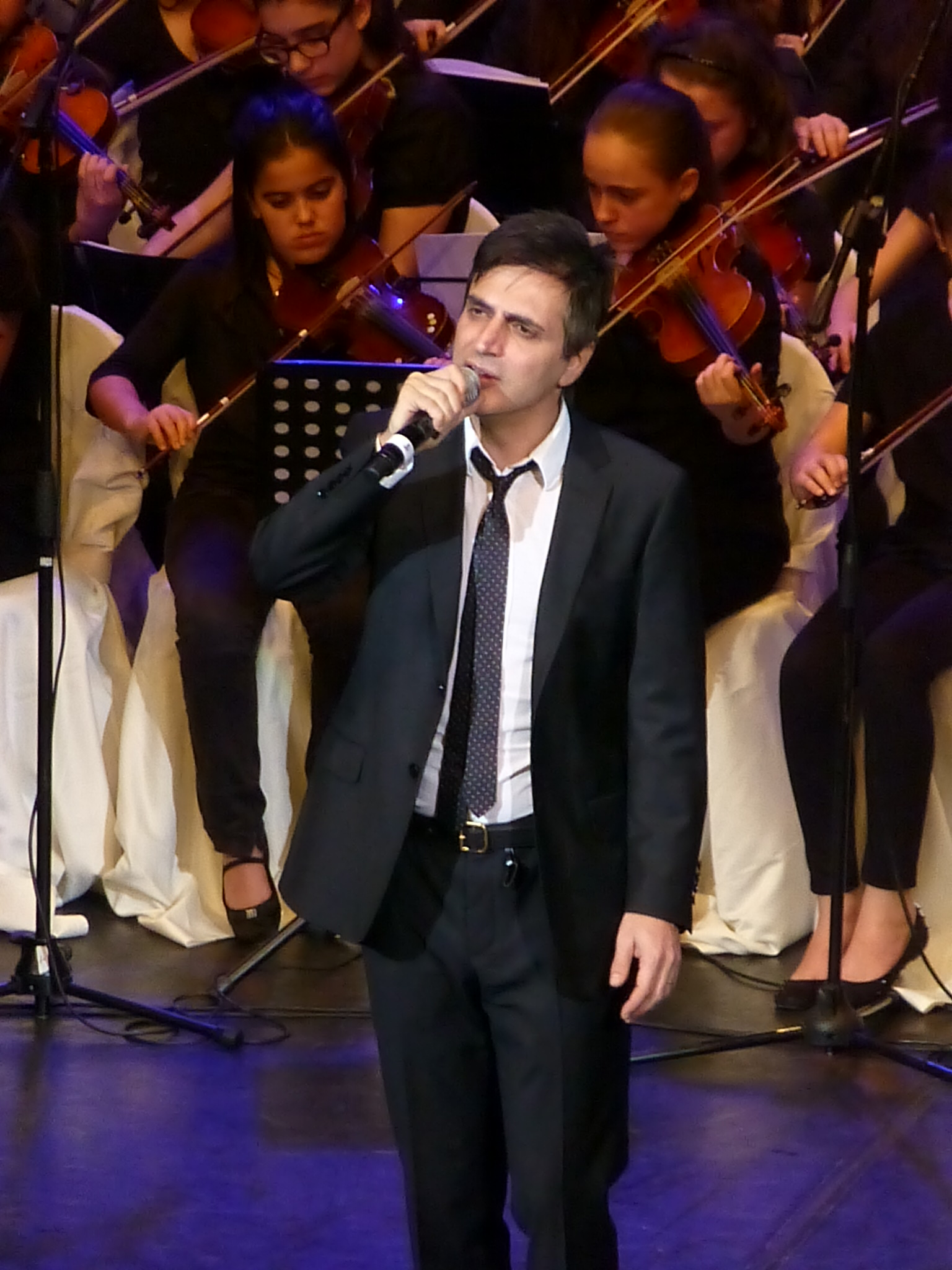
Teoman Yakupoğlu

== See also ==
- 1966–67 1.Lig
