= 1969 in Turkey =

- Centuries: 20th; 21st
- Decades: 1940s; 1950s; 1960s; 1970s; 1980s
- See also: List of years in Turkey

Events in the year 1969 in Turkey.

== Parliament ==
- 13th Parliament of Turkey (up to 12 October)
- 14th Parliament of Turkey

== Incumbents ==
- President – Cevdet Sunay
- Prime Minister – Süleyman Demirel
- Leader of the opposition – İsmet İnönü

== Ruling party and the main opposition ==
- Ruling party – Justice Party (AP)
- Main opposition – Republican People's Party (CHP)

== Cabinet ==
- 30th government of Turkey (up to 3 November)
- 31st government of Turkey (from 3 November)

== Events ==
- 9 February – Alparslan Türkeş ̧ elected chairman of the Nationalist Movement Party.
- 15/16 February – Protests against the visiting United States Sixth Fleet
- 28 March – Earthquake in Alaşehir
- 8 April – Widespread student demonstrations
- 12 April – Atatürk Cultural Center opens.
- 3 May – Demonstrations at the funeral of Court of Cassation.
- 25 May – Galatasaray wins the Turkish championship.
- 31 May – Istanbul University closes following civil unrest.
- 11 August – Bülent Ecevit says that the soil belongs to people who cultivate it and water to people who use it.
- 12 October – 1969 Turkish general election results in AP 260 seats, CHP 144 seats, GP 14 seats, MP 6 seats, BP 7 seats, YTP 3 seats, TİP 2 seats, MHP 1 seat and Independents 11 seats
- 18 December – The battleship TCG Yavuz sold for scrapping.

== Births ==
- 12 March – Beyazıt Öztürk, television personality
- 29 April – İzel Çeliköz, singer
- 29 May – Acun Ilıcalı, television personality
- 7 July – Metin Feyzioğlu, academician, lawyer
- 9 December – Ayşe Arman, journalist

== Deaths ==
- 5 April – Yusuf Kemal Tengirşenk (aged 91), politician
- 21 May – Kamil Ocak (aged 55), politician
- 24 October – Behçet Kemal Çağlar (aged 61), poet
- 3 November – Zeki Rıza Sporel (aged 81), footballer

== Gallery ==
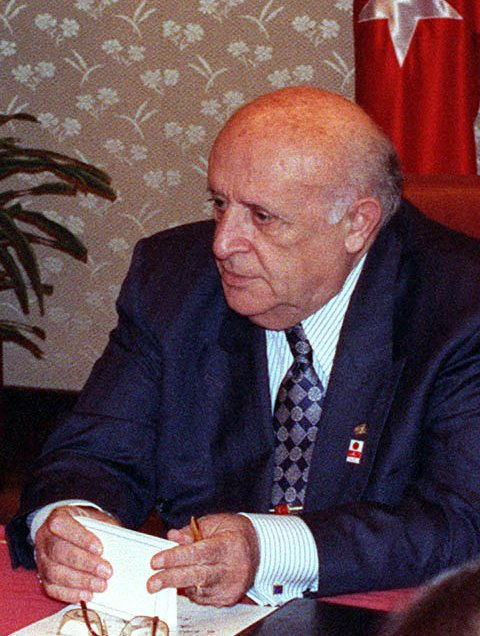
Süleyman Demirel

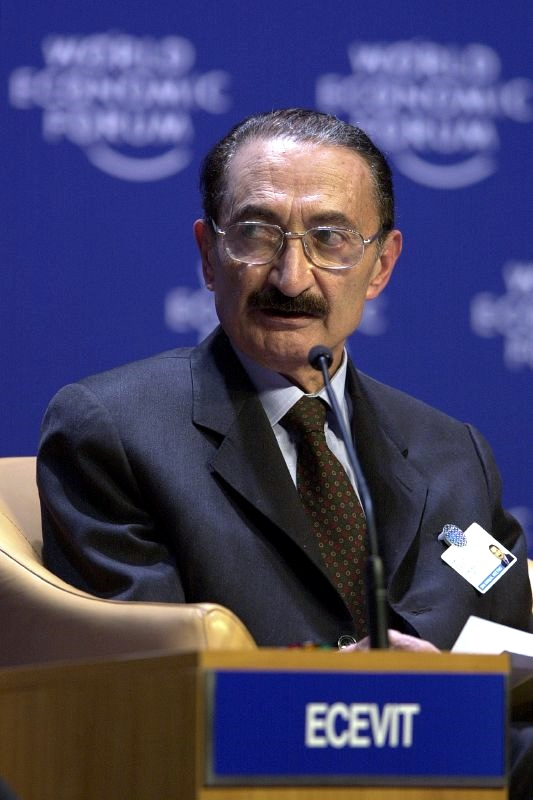
Bülent Ecevit

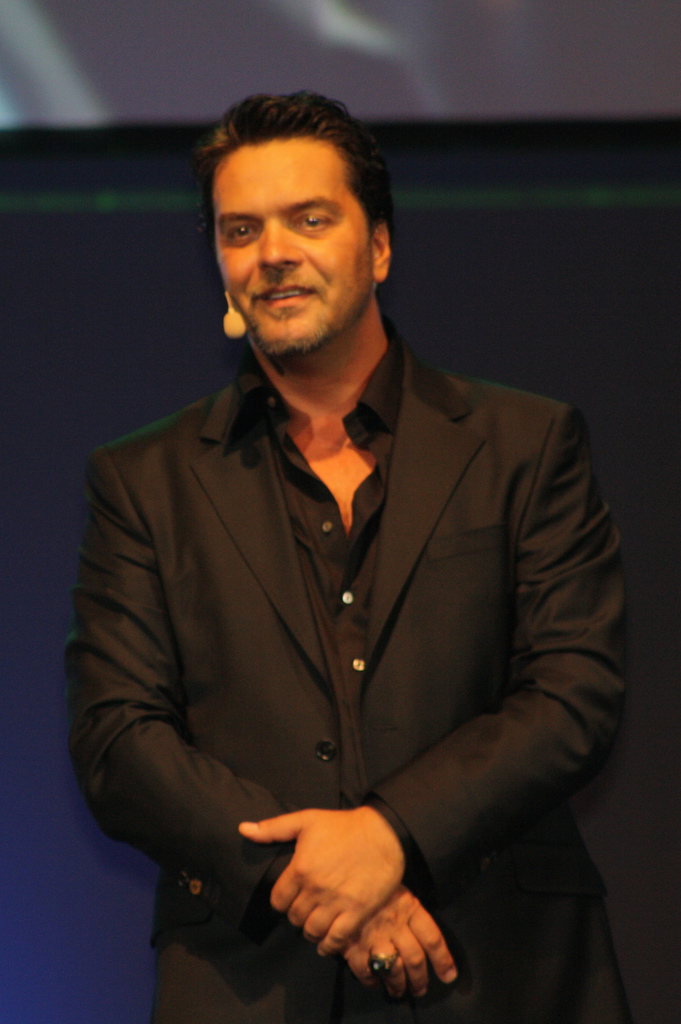
Beyazıt öztürk

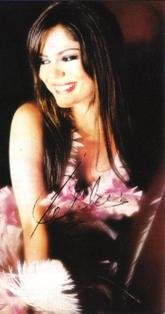
İzel Çeliköz

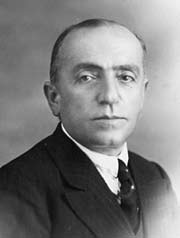
Yusuf Kemal Tengirşenk

== See also ==
- 1968–69 1.Lig
