= Sadık Kutlay =

Turkish politician

Cafer Sadık Kutlay

Minister of Construction and Settlement
- In office 15 December 1964 – 20 February 1965
- Prime Minister: İsmet İnönü
- Preceded by: Celalettin Uzer
- Succeeded by: Recai İskenderoğlu

Personal details
- Born: 1912 Anamur, Mersin Province, Ottoman Empire
- Died: July 26, 1988 (aged 75–76)
- Party: Republican People's Party (CHP)
- Children: 3
- Education: Civil engineering
- Alma mater: Istanbul Technical University
- Occupation: Politician
- Profession: Civil engineer

Cafer Sadık Kutlay (1912 – 26 July 1988) was a Turkish, business man, civil engineer, politician and former government minister.

== Early life ==
Cafer Sadık was born in Anamur ilçe (district) of Mersin Province in 1912. He graduated from Istanbul Technical University and served in the State Hydraulic Works (DSİ) of Turkey. Between 1945 and 1951, he was the regional director of DSİ in Samsun. Then, he established his own company to work as a constructor and consultant.

== Politics ==
He joined the Republican People's Party (CHP). In the 1961 general election, he won a seat as a deputy from Mersin Province in the 12th Parliament of Turkey. On 15 December 1964, he was appointed Minister of Construction and Settlement in the 28th government of Turkey. His term ended when the government was overturned by a motion of no confidence on 20 February 1965. He kept his seat in the parliament in the 13th Parliament of Turkey until 1969 general election.

Kutlay was married, and father of three. He died on 26 July 1988.

Political offices
Preceded by Celalettin Uzer	Minister of Construction and Settlement; 15 December 1964 – 20 February 1965	Succeeded by Recai İskenderoğlu
