= 1966 in Turkey =

- Centuries: 20th; 21st
- Decades: 1940s; 1950s; 1960s; 1970s; 1980s
- See also: List of years in Turkey

Events in the year 1966 in Turkey.

== Parliament ==
- 13th Parliament of Turkey

== Incumbents ==
- President

Cemal Gürsel (up to 28 March)
Cevdet Sunay (from 28 March)

- Prime Minister – Süleyman Demirel
- Leader of the opposition – İsmet İnönü

== Ruling party and the main opposition ==
- Ruling party – Justice Party (AP)
- Main opposition – Republican People's Party (CHP)

== Cabinet ==
- 30th government of Turkey

== Events ==
- 3 January – First pipeline of Turkey between Batman and İskenderun
- 26 March – A report by a medical board stating that the president Cemal Gürsel, a victim of paralysis was unable to resume his work. (This eventually led to the election of Cevdet Sunay as the president.)
- 29 May – Beşiktaş won the championship of Turkish football league.
- 5 June – Turkish Senate 1/3 by elections
- 28 June – 504 Turks in Erenköy enclave, Cyprus, sieged by Greek forces were evacuated.
- 8 July – President Cevdet Sunay pardons former president Celal Bayar.
- 19 August – The 6.8 M_{w} Varto earthquake shook the Muş Province with a maximum Mercalli intensity of IX (Violent), killing at least 2,394 and injuring up to 1,500.
- 17 September – Unity Party was founded
- 8 December – 65 soldiers in Dumlu died because of an accident.

== Births ==
- 16 May – Metin Şentürk, singer
- 28 June – Şenay Gürler, actress
- 20 June Fatma Şahin – mayor of Gaziantep and a former government minister
- 16 July – Yıldız Tilbe, singer
- 14 August – Tuncay Özkan, journalist

== Deaths ==
- 2 February Hacı Ömer Sabancı, a well known industrialist
- 6 February Abdurrahman Nafiz Gürman, a former chief of staff
- 14 February – Ahmet Esat Tomruk (İngiliz Kemal) (aged 74), former secret agent
- 28 June – Fuat Köprülü former vice prime minister and academic
- 14 September – Cemal Gürsel, former president

== Gallery ==
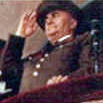
Cemal Gürsel

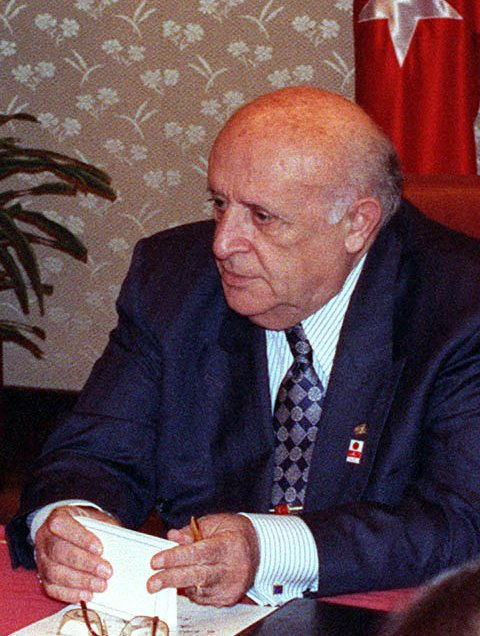
Süleyman Demirel

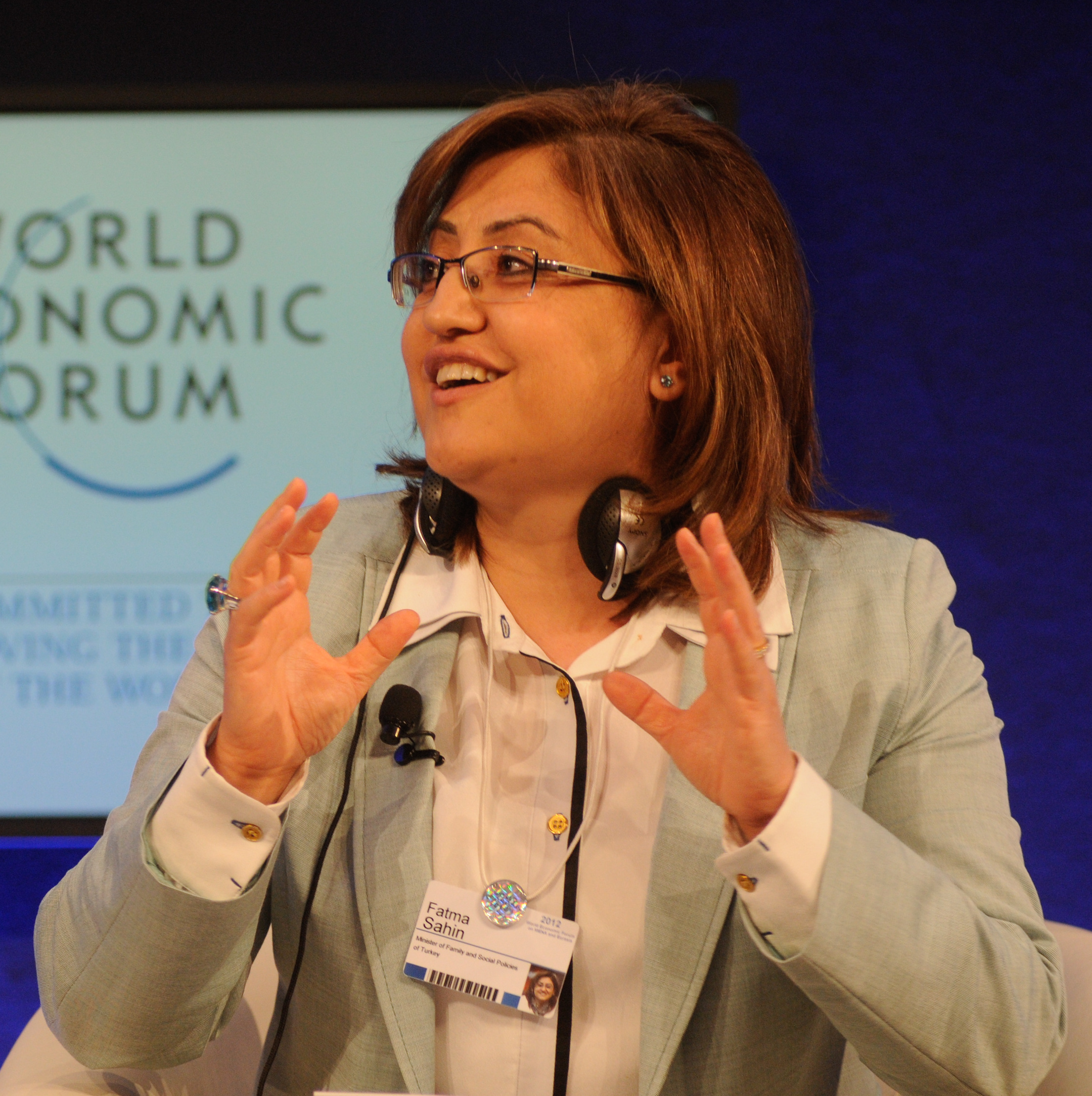
Fatma Şahin

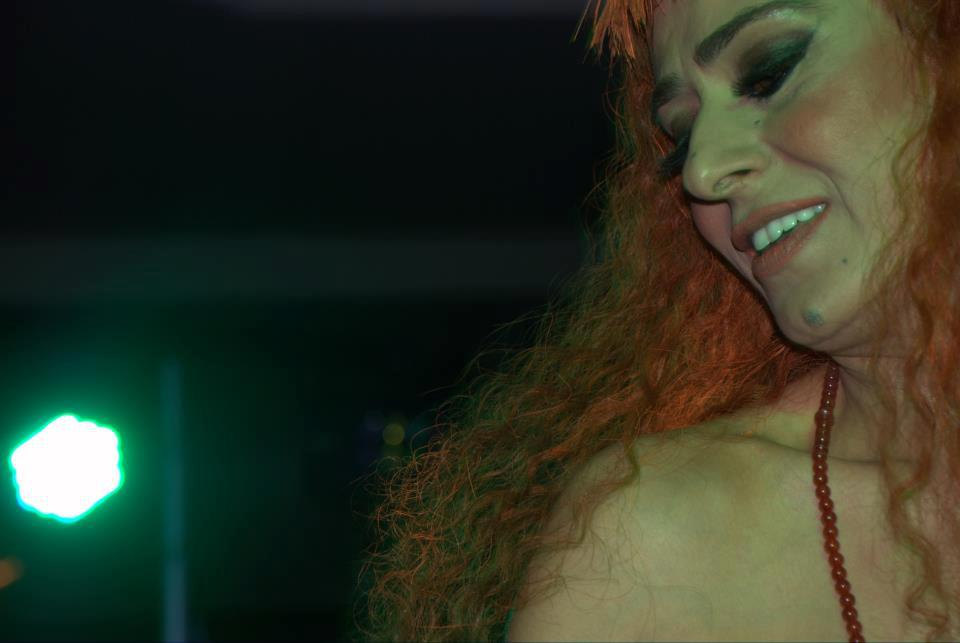
Yıldız Tilbe

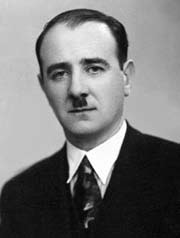
Fuat Köprülü

== See also ==
- 1965–66 1.Lig
