= 1968 in Turkey =

- Centuries: 20th; 21st
- Decades: 1940s; 1950s; 1960s; 1970s; 1980s
- See also: List of years in Turkey

Events in the year 1968 in Turkey.

== Parliament ==
- 13th Parliament of Turkey

== Incumbents ==
- President – Cevdet Sunay
- Prime Minister – Süleyman Demirel
- Leader of the opposition – İsmet İnönü

== Ruling party and the main opposition ==
- Ruling party – Justice Party (AP)
- Main opposition – Republican People's Party (CHP)

== Cabinet ==
- 30th government of Turkey

== Events ==
- 15 January – Gulf of İzmit froze
- 8 March – 22 passengers died in a bus accident near Bolvadin
- 17 March – 33 passengers died in a bus accident near Istanbul
- 26 May – Fenerbahçe is the champion of the Turkish football league
- 2 June – Senate 1/3 elections (AP 38 seats, CHP 13 seats, MP 1 seat, GP 1 seat)
- 3 September – The Bartın earthquake affected the area with a maximum Mercalli intensity of VIII (Severe), causing 24–29 deaths and 200 injuries
- 17 June and the following days – Widespread university demonstrations
- 25–30 October – French President Charles de Gaulle visits Turkey.
- 22 November – First heart transplantations in Turkey (Ankara)
- 31 December – TRT 1 First television broadcast

== Births ==
- 23 February – İlhan Cihaner, politician and lawyer
- 1 July – Emine Ayna, politician
- 5 June – Şebnem Dönmez, actress
- 17 July – Derya Arbaş Berti (Derya Arbaş), actress
- 11 August – Özlem Çerçioğlu, mayor of Aydın
- 30 October – Merve Kavakçı, politician
- 3 December – Aylin Nazlıaka, politician

== Deaths ==
- 10 January – Ali Fuat Cebesoy (born 1882), former general
- 9 March – Haşim İşcan (born 1898), mayor of Istanbul
- 2 September – Sabiha Sertel, female journalist
- 11 October – Selim Sarper (born 1899) former minister of foreign affairs

== Gallery ==
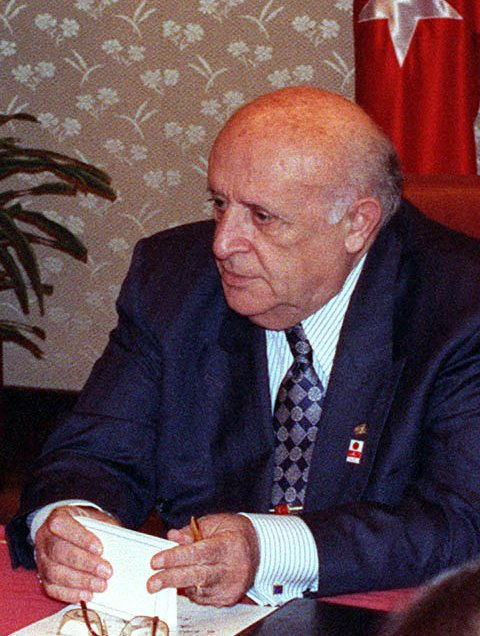
Süleyman Demirel

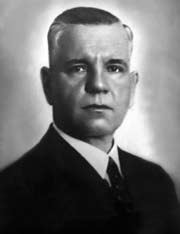
Ali Fuat Cebesoy

== See also ==
- 1967–68 1.Lig
- Turkey at the 1968 Summer Olympics
- Turkey at the 1968 Winter Olympics
