= Deran =

Deran or DeRan or Dar An or Doran (Persian: دران) may refer to:

== Places ==
- Deran, Gilan, village in Masal County, Gilan Province, Iran
- Doran, Kerman, village in Kerman County, Kerman Province, Iran

== Surname ==
- Burhânettin Deran (1902–1965), Turkish composer and performer
- James J. DeRan Jr. (1906–1986), American politician

== Given name ==
- Deran Sarafian, American director and actor
- Deran Toksöz (born 1988), German footballer

== Other ==
- Deran (album), album by singer Bombino

== See also ==
- Daran, Iran, capital city of Fereydan County, Isfahan Province
