= 1963 Turkish local elections =

- 17 November 1963
	Majority party	Minority party	Third party
Leader	Ragıp Gümüşpala	İsmet İnönü	Ekrem Alican
Party	Justice Party	CHP	YTP
Popular vote	4.344.185	3.458.972	621.600
Percentage	45.48%	36.22%	6.51%
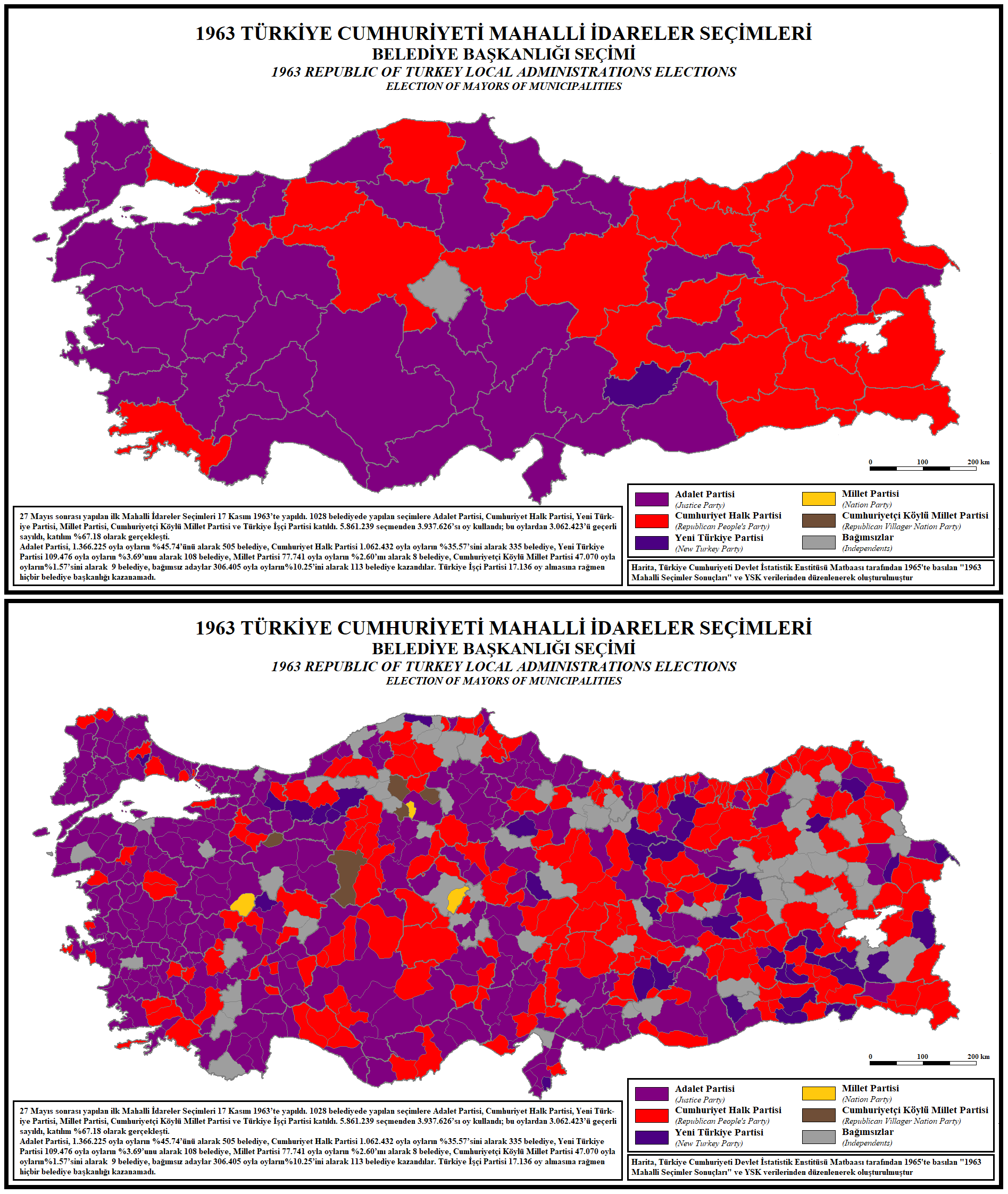
- The results of 1963 Turkish local elections according to city centres.

Local elections were held in Turkey on 17 November 1963. In the elections, both the mayors and the local parliaments (Turkish: İl Genel Meclisi) were elected. The figures presented below are the results of the local parliament elections.

== Results ==
=== Provincial assemblies ===
Party	Votes	%
Justice Party	4,344,185	45.48
Republican People's Party	3,458,972	36.22
New Turkey Party	621,600	6.51
Nation Party	295,523	3.09
Republican Villagers Nation Party	292,596	3.06
Workers' Party of Turkey	37,898	0.40
Independents	500,315	5.24
Total	9,551,089	100.00

=== Mayors ===
Province	Party
Adana	AP
Adapazarı	AP
Adıyaman	YTP
Afyonkarahisar	AP
Ağrı	AP
Amasya	AP
Ankara	CHP
Antalya	AP
Artvin	CHP
Aydın	AP
Balıkesir	AP
Bilecik	CHP
Bingöl	CHP
Bitlis	CHP
Bolu	AP
Burdur	AP
Bursa	AP

Province	Party
Çanakkale	AP
Çankırı	AP
Çorum	AP
Denizli	AP
Diyarbakır	CHP
Edirne	AP
Elazığ	AP
Erzincan	AP
Erzurum	AP
Eskişehir	AP
Gaziantep	AP
Giresun	CHP
Gümüşhane	CHP
Hakkâri	CHP
Hatay	AP
Isparta	AP
Istanbul	CHP

Province	Party
İzmir	AP
İzmit	AP
Kars	CHP
Kastamonu	AP
Kayseri	AP
Kırklareli	AP
Kırşehir	IND.
Konya	AP
Kütahya	AP
Malatya	CHP
Manisa	AP
Mersin	AP
Kahramanmaraş	CHP
Mardin	CHP
Muğla	CHP
Muş	CHP
Nevşehir	AP

Province	Party
Niğde	AP
Ordu	AP
Rize	CHP
Samsun	AP
Siirt	CHP
Sinop	AP
Sivas	CHP
Tekirdağ	AP
Tokat	AP
Trabzon	CHP
Tunceli	CHP
Şanlıurfa	AP
Uşak	AP
Van	CHP
Yozgat	CHP
Zonguldak	AP
