= 1971 in Turkey =

- Centuries: 20th; 21st
- Decades: 1950s; 1960s; 1970s; 1980s; 1990s
- See also: List of years in Turkey

Events in the year 1971 in Turkey.

== Parliament ==
- 14th Parliament of Turkey

== Incumbents ==
- President – Cevdet Sunay
- Prime Minister :

Süleyman Demirel (up to 26 March 1971)
Nihat Erim (From 26 March 1971)

- Leader of the opposition – İsmet İnönü (up to 26 March 1971)

== Ruling party and the main opposition ==
- Ruling party – Justice Party (AP) (up to 26 March 1971)
- Main opposition – Republican People's Party (CHP) (up to 26 March 1971)

== Cabinet ==
- 32nd government of Turkey (up to 26 March 1971)
- 33rd government of Turkey (26 March 1971 – 11 December 1971)
- 34th government of Turkey (from 11 December 1971)

== Events ==
- 20 January – Middle East Technical University closes following student unrest.
- 21 March – CHP secretary general Bülent Ecevit resigns from his position because of İsmet İnönü’s support of the new government.
- 7 April – Nihat Erim forms a government.
- 27 April – Martial law declared; student associations banned.
- 13 May – Bingöl earthquake
- 21 May – Constitutional Court closes down National Order Party for anti-secular propaganda.
- 6 June – Galatasaray wins the Turkish championship.
- 20 July – Constitutional Court bans the Labor Party.
- 19 September – Filiz Vural wins the Miss Europe.
- 20 September – Parliament amends the constitution.
- 6 October–17 October – Mediterranean Games take place in İzmir.
- 12 October – U.S. vice president Spiro Agnew visits Ankara.
- 18 October – Queen Elizabeth II visits Turkey.
- 3 December – Vice Prime Minister Atilla Karaosmanoğlu and 10 other government ministers resign, ending the 33rd government.

== Births ==
- 1 January – Emrah İpek (Emrah), singer
- 25 January – Elif Şafak, novelist
- 1 September – Hakan Şükür, former footballer and MP
- 7 November – Kazım Koyuncu, singer

== Deaths ==
- 21 March – Falih Rıfkı Atay (aged 77), former journalist and politician
- 14 July – Kılıç Ali (Ali Kılıç) (aged 81), former military officer and close friend of Atatürk
- 11 October – Hikmet Kıvılcımlı, leftist politician and writer

== Gallery ==
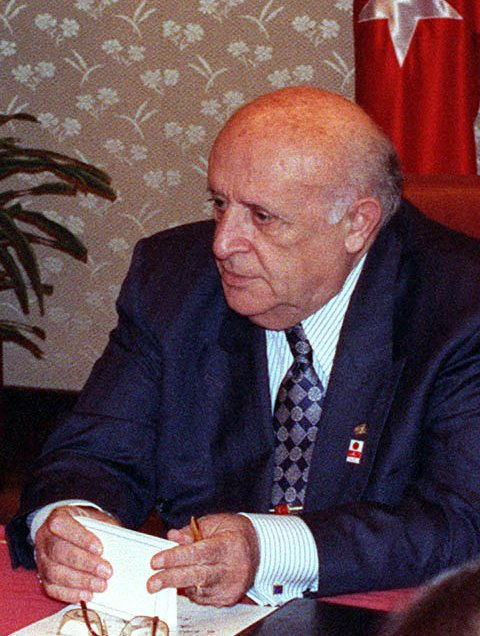
Süleyman Demirel

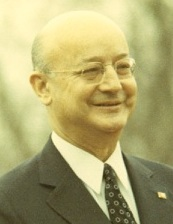
Nihat Erim

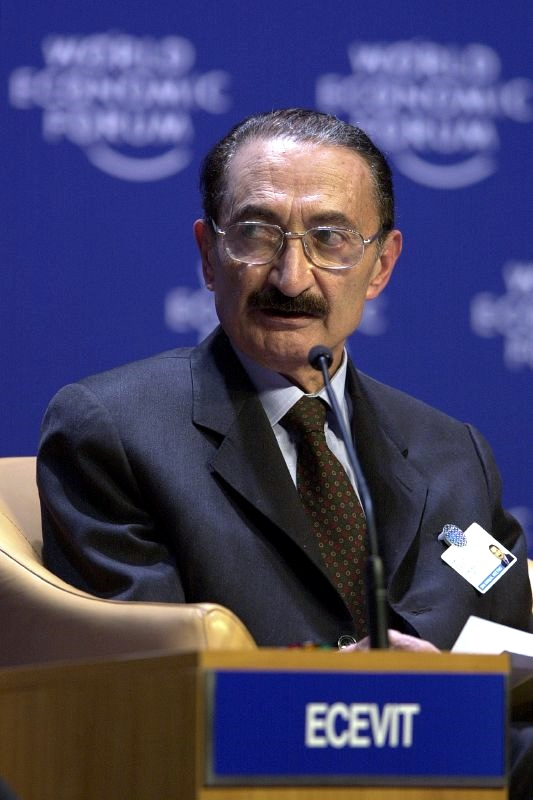
Bülent Ecevit

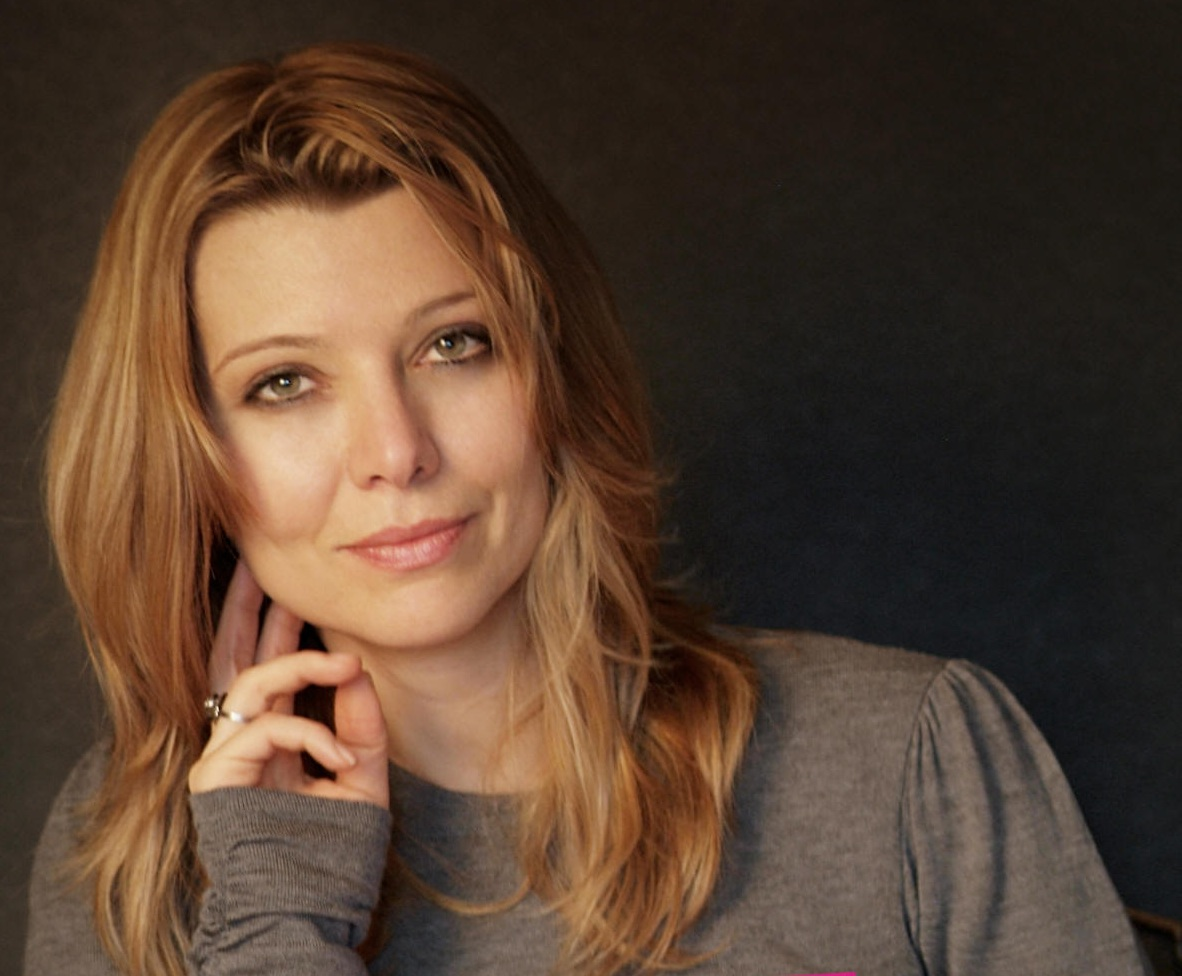
Elif Şafak

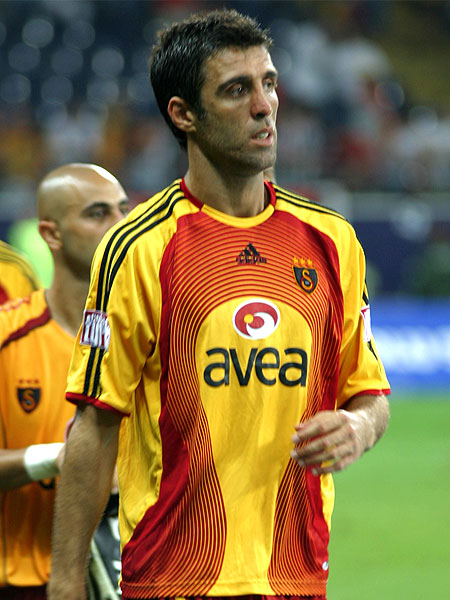
Hakan Şükür

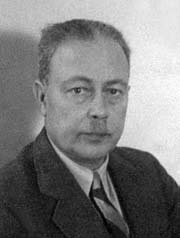
Falih Rıfkı Atay

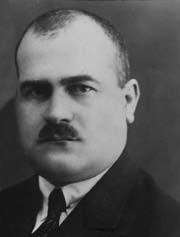
Kılıç Ali

== See also ==
- 1970–71 1.Lig
- List of Turkish films of 1971
