= Ökmen =

Ökmen is a surname of Turkish origin. It was one of the surnames which was suggested by the Turkish Language Research Institution (Turkish: Türk Dili Araştırma Kurumu), precursor of the Turkish Language Association, after the Turkish language reform in 1932. Its meaning is "crop".

Notable people with the surname are as follows:

- Mümtaz Ökmen (1895–1961), Turkish lawyer and politician
- Nedim Ökmen (1908–1967), Turkish economist and politician
