= 1970 in Turkey =

- Centuries: 20th; 21st
- Decades: 1950s; 1960s; 1970s; 1980s; 1990s
- See also: List of years in Turkey

Events in the year 1970 in Turkey.

== Parliament ==
- 14th Parliament of Turkey

== Incumbents ==
- President – Cevdet Sunay
- Prime Minister – Süleyman Demirel
- Leader of the opposition – İsmet İnönü

== Ruling party and the main opposition ==
- Ruling party – Justice Party (AP)
- Main opposition – Republican People's Party (CHP)

== Cabinet ==
- 31st government of Turkey (up to 6 March 1970)
- 32nd government of Turkey (from 6 March 1970)

== Events ==
- 26 January – Necmettin Erbakan founds National Order Party.
- 31 January – Pro-Islamic National Order Party formed.
- 27 March – Gediz earthquake
- 31 May – Fenerbahçe wins the Turkish championship.
- 15–16 June – Martial law proclaimed after demonstrations in Istanbul and Kocaeli.
- 22 July – Turkey signs an agreement with the European Community.
- 9 August – Devaluation
- 15 October – Aeroflot Flight 244 hijacked from the Soviet Union to Trabzon
- 25 October – Census (population 35,666,549)
- 18 December – A group of former Justice Party members form the Democratic Party.

== Births ==
- 14 January – Fazıl Say, musician
- 21 March – Cenk Uygur, Turkish-American youtuber
- 14 April – Emre Altuğ, singer and actor
- 3 July – Aşkın Nur Yengi, singer
- 1 August Sibel Can, singer
- 10 October Şafak Sezer, actor

== Deaths ==
- 14 January – Asım Gündüz (aged 90), general
- 11 February – Tahsin Yazıcı (aged 79), general, Korean War veteran
- 3 June – Orhan Kemal (aged 55), born Mehmet Reşat Öğütçü, novelist
- 29 November – Irfan Orga (aged 62), airman and author

== Gallery ==
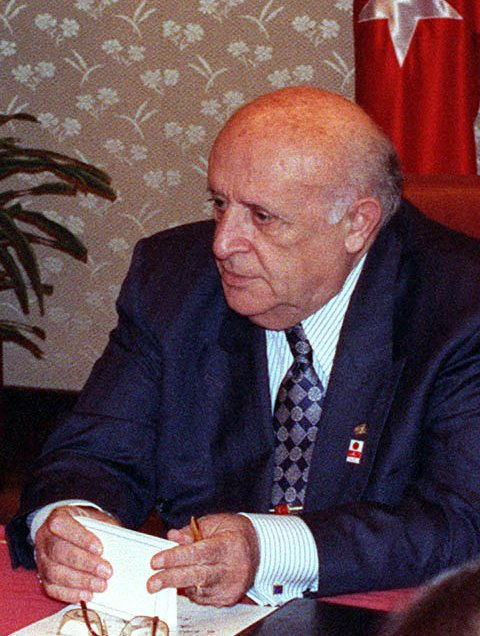
Süleyman Demirel

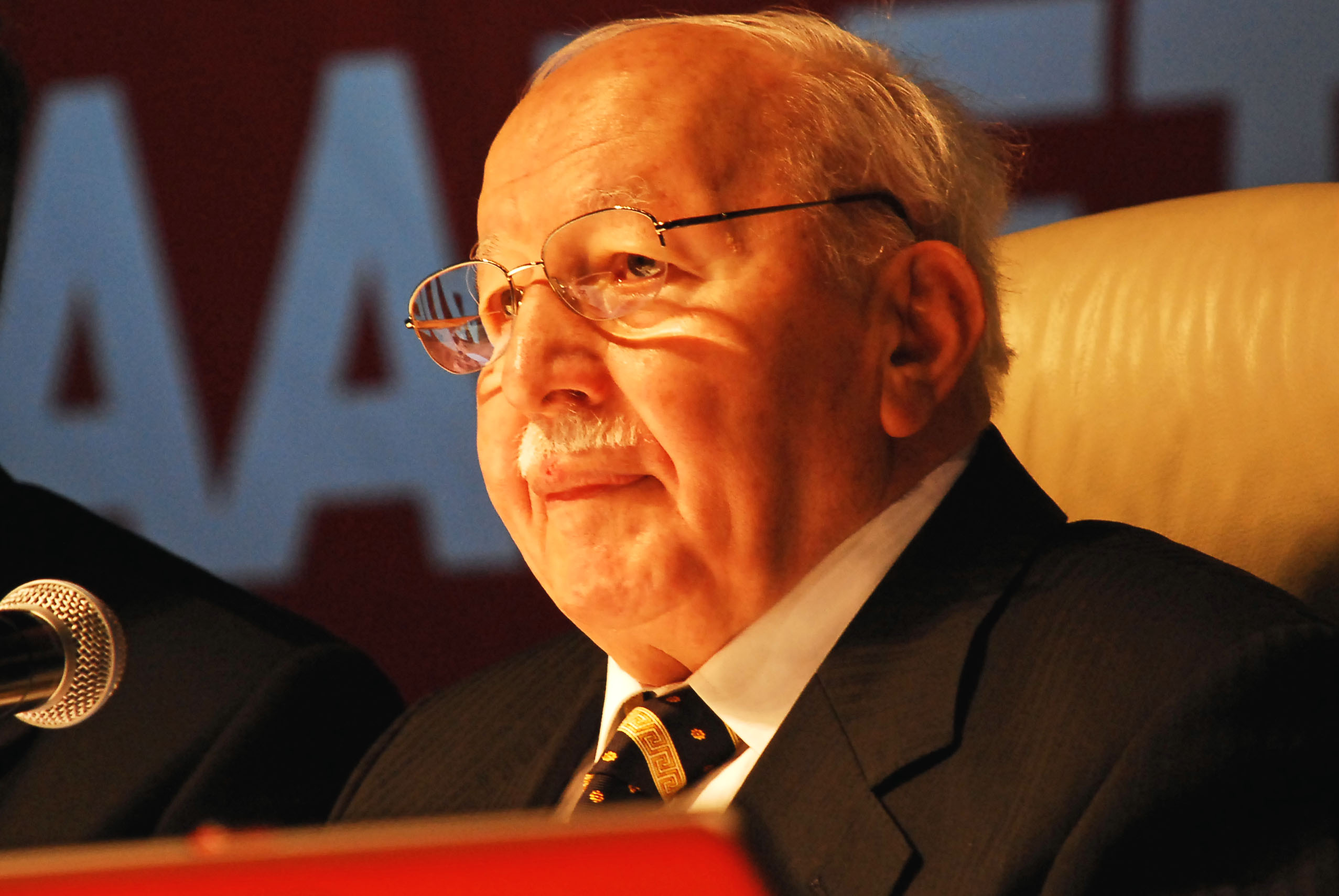
Necmettin Erbakan

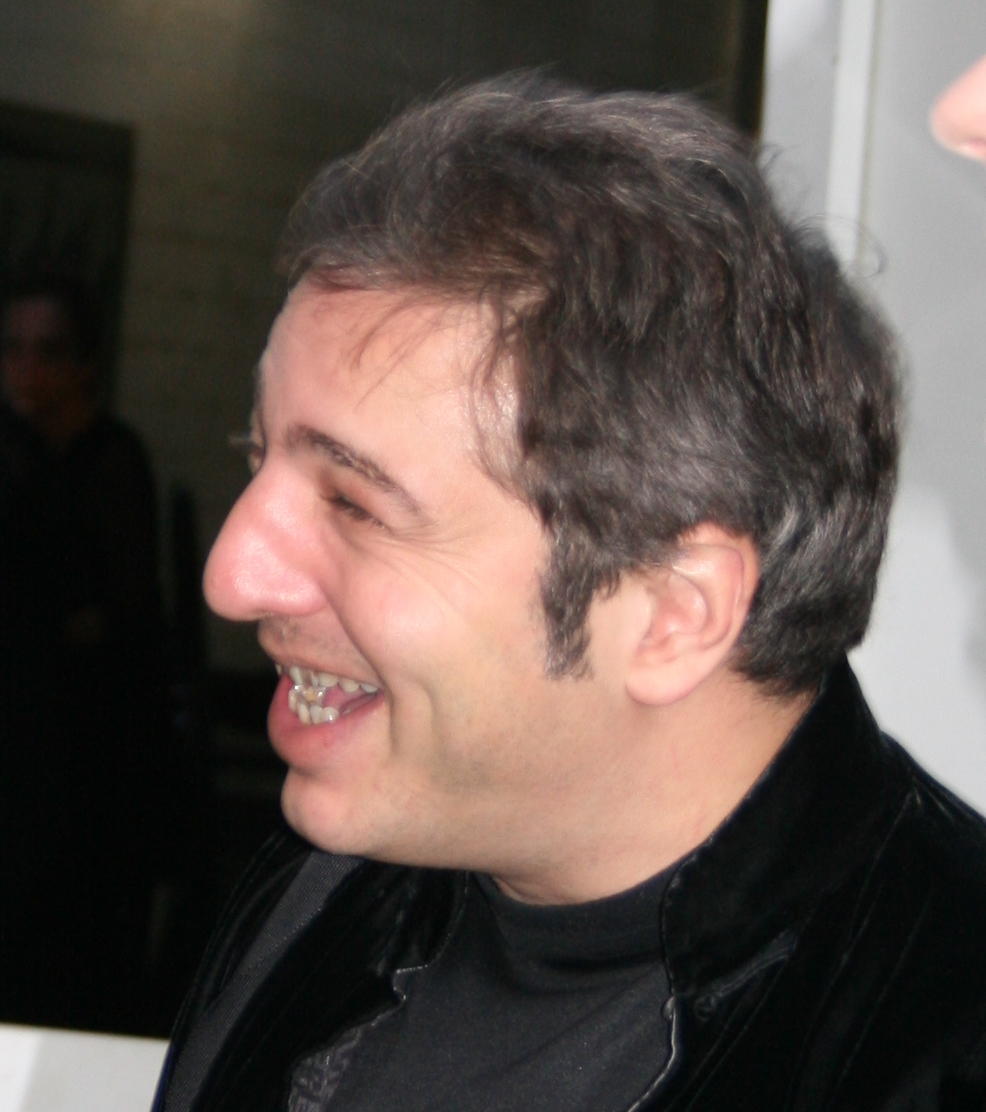
Fazıl Say

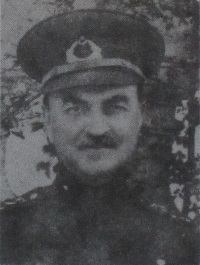
Asım Gündüz

== See also ==
- 1969–70 1.Lig
- List of Turkish films of 1970
