= Lebit Yurdoğlu =

Turkish politician

Lebit Fehmi Yurdoğlu

Ministry of Village Affairs
- In office 25 December 1963 – 20 February 1965
- Prime Minister: İsmet İnönü
- Preceded by: (newly established)
- Succeeded by: Seyfi Öztürk

Personal details
- Born: 1915 Istanbul, Ottoman Empire
- Died: October 23, 1978 (aged 62–63) Ankara, Turkey
- Party: Republican People's Party (CHP)
- Children: 2
- Education: Medicine
- Alma mater: Istanbul University
- Occupation: Politician
- Profession: Physician

Lebit Fehmi Yurdoğlu (1915 – 23 October 1978) was a Turkish physician, politician and former government minister.

Lebit Fehmi was born in Istanbul, Ottoman Empire in 1915. He graduated from the Faculty of Medicine at Istanbul University, and served as an internist.

In the 1950s, he joined the Republican People's Party (CHP), and became a member of the municipal council of İzmir. In 1961, he represented his political party in the Constituent Assembly of Turkey. In the general election held in the same year, he entered the 12th Parliament of Turkey as a deputy of İzmir Province. He kept his seat in the next term. In the 14th Parliament of Turkey, he was elected as a deputy of Istanbul Province.

Lebit Yurdoğlu is known as the founder of the Ministry of Village Affairs, which would later on merged to the Ministry of Food, Agriculture and Livestock. He was the first Minister of Village Affairs in the 28th government of Turkey between 25 December 1963 and 20 February 1965. He also wrote a book about the newly established ministry.

Yurdoğlu was married and father of two. He died on 23 October 1978 in Ankara.

== Legacy ==
A public park in İzmir is named after Lebit Yurdoğlu.
