= Hacıkışla, Hendek =

Hacıkışla
- Neighbourhood
- Location in Turkey Hacıkışla (Marmara)
- Coordinates: 40°52′24″N 30°38′21″E
- Country: Turkey
- Province: Sakarya
- District: Hendek
- Population (2022): 697
- Time zone: UTC+3 (TRT)

Hacıkışla is a neighbourhood of the municipality and district of Hendek, Sakarya Province, Turkey. Its population is 697 (2022). It lies northwest of the town of Hendek.

== Population ==
Most of the people in Hacıkışla are from the Black Sea coast of Turkey. A lot of hazelnut is grown here due to the Black Sea ancestry. There is a stadium and a soccer team. The team plays in the Turkish Amateur League and is called Hacıkışlaspor.
