= 1964 Turkish Senate election =

Senate elections were held in Turkey on 7 June 1964. In this election 51 members of the Senate were elected; 50 members for one-third of the Senate and one vacant seat.

== Results ==
Party	Votes	%	Seats
Justice Party	1,385,655	50.28	31
Republican People's Party	1,125,783	40.85	19
New Turkey Party	96,427	3.50	0
Republican Villagers Nation Party	83,400	3.03	0
Independents	64,498	2.34	1
Total	2,755,763	100.00	51
Total votes	2,808,592	–	
Registered voters/turnout	4,668,865	60.16	
Source: Nohlen et al.
