= Ministry of Village Affairs =

Former ministry of Turkey

Ministry of Village Affairs (Turkish: Köy İşleri Bakanlığı) was a former government ministry in Turkey.

It was founded on 25 December 1963 in the 28th government of Turkey. The purpose of the ministry was to support and improve the underdeveloped villages. The founder of the ministry was Lebit Yurdoğlu, who was the first minister. The directorate Road Water Electricity was a sub unit of the ministry. Beginning by the 37th government of Turkey on 26 January 1974, the ministry was renamed the "Ministry of Village Affairs and Cooperatives". The ministry continued for 20 years and it was merged to the Ministry of Agriculture on 13 December 1983 during the formation of the 45th government of Turkey. The Ministry of Agriculture was named "Ministry of Agriculture and Village Affairs". But on 14 June 2011 during the formation of the 61st government of Turkey the phrase "Village Affairs" was dropped and the ministry was renamed "Ministry of Food, Agriculture and Livestock".
