= Hendek =

- District and municipality
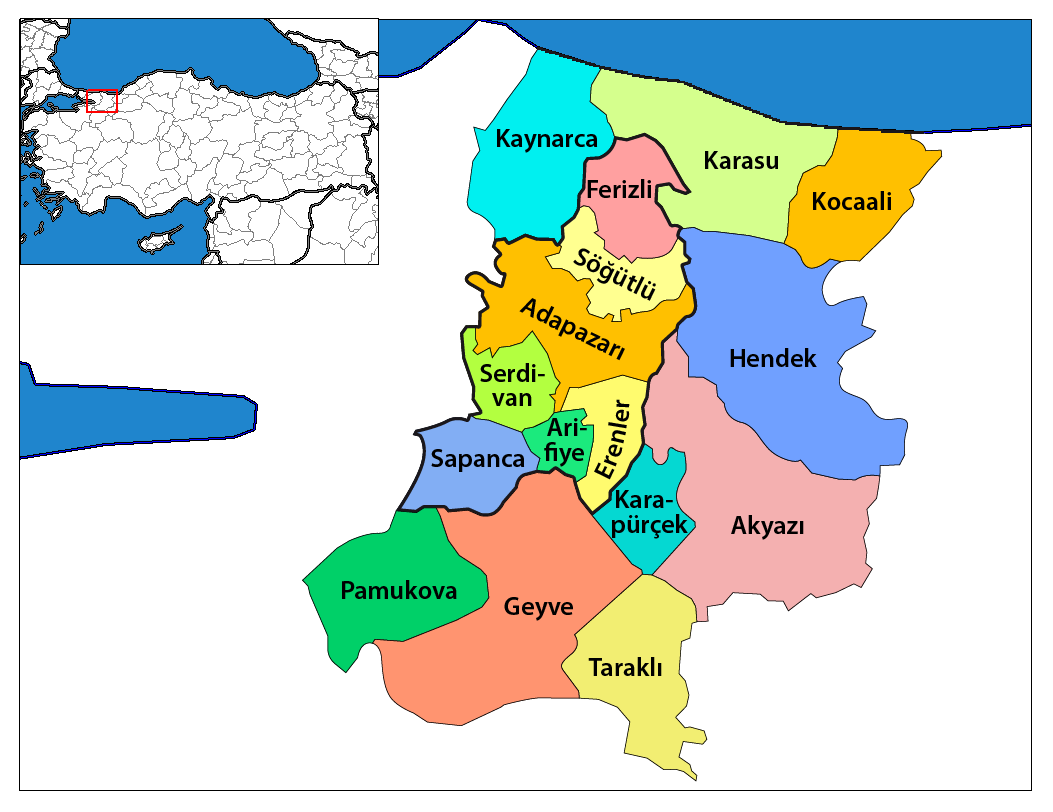
- Map showing Hendek District in Sakarya Province

- Location within Turkey Location within Marmara
- Coordinates: 40°48′18″N 30°44′57″E
- Country: Turkey
- Province: Sakarya

Government
  - Mayor: Irfan Püsküllü (BBP)
- Area: 646 km^{2} (249 sq mi)
- Elevation: 197 m (646 ft)
- Population (2022): 90,153
  - Density: 140/km^{2} (361/sq mi)
- Time zone: UTC+3 (TRT)
- Postal code: 54300
- Area code: 0264
- Climate: Cfb
- Website: www.hendek.bel.tr

Hendek is a municipality and district of Sakarya Province, Turkey. Its area is 646 km^{2}, and its population is 90,153 (2022). The municipality was founded in 1907. The mayor of the city is Irfan Püsküllü (BBP).

== Composition ==
There are 92 neighbourhoods in Hendek District:

- Akarca
- Akçayır
- Akova
- Akpınar
- Aksu
- Aktefek
- Aşağıçalıca
- Bakacak
- Balıklıihsaniye
- Başpınar
- Bayraktepe
- Beyköy
- Beylice
- Bıçkıatik
- Büyükdere
- Çakallık
- Çamlıca
- Çayırbaşı
- Çiftlik
- Çobanyatak
- Çukurhan
- Dereboğazı
- Dereköy
- Dikmen
- Esentepe
- Eskibıçkı
- Göksu
- Güldibi
- Gündoğan
- Güney
- Hacıkışla
- Hacımbey
- Hallaç
- Hamitli
- Harmantepe
- Hicriye
- Hüseyinşeyh
- İkbaliye
- İkramiye
- Kadifekale
- Kahraman
- Kalayık
- Karadere
- Karatoprak
- Kargalı Hanbaba
- Kargalıyeniköy
- Kazımiye
- Kemaliye
- Kırktepe
- Kızanlık
- Kocaahmetler
- Kocatöngel
- Köprübaşı
- Kurtköy
- Kurtuluş
- Lütfiyeköşk
- Mahmutbey
- Martinler
- Muradiye
- Necatipaşa
- Nuriye
- Paşaköy
- Pınarlı
- Puna Ortaköy
- Rasimpaşa
- Sarıdede
- Sarıyer
- Servetiye
- Şeyhler
- Sivritepe
- Sofular
- Soğuksu
- Sukenarı
- Süleymaniye
- Sümbüllü
- Turanlar
- Türbe
- Tuzak
- Uzuncaorman
- Uzunçarşı
- Yağbasan
- Yarıca
- Yayalar
- Yeni
- Yeniköy
- Yeniyayla
- Yeşilköy
- Yeşiller
- Yeşilvadi
- Yeşilyurt
- Yukarıçalıca
- Yukarıhüseyinşeyh

== Notable natives ==
- Gaffar Okkan (1952–2001), assassinated police chief
- Süleyman Seba (1926–2014), former football player and long-time president of Beşiktaş J.K.
- Gonca Vuslateri (1986- ) actress, columnist, screenwriter and poet

== See also ==
- 1965 Hendek bus accident
