= 1965 Hendek bus accident =

Motor vehicle accident in Turkey

The 1965 Hendek bus accident occurred on August 11, 1965, in the Hendek district of Sakarya Province, Turkey. It involved a passenger bus and a truck carrying hazardous materials, resulting in a traffic accident where 25 passengers died.

== Accident ==
At around 3:15 in the morning of August 11, 1965, the passenger bus Sinemalı Civan operated by Civan Turizm and driven by Özdemir Süer was traveling on the D-100 highway from Istanbul to Ankara. Near the village of Kargalıhanbaba, the bus collided with a truck carrying nitric acid, which was waiting on the roadside due to a shaft malfunction. The truck was being operated by Mustafa Filik.

As a result of the accident, the nitric acid in the truck's tanker spilled onto the ground and into a puddle by the roadside. The intense fumes created by the reaction of nitric acid with water caused panic among some of the passengers who were sleeping inside the bus. They thought the bus was on fire and attempted to evacuate in a state of distress. However, when they left the bus, their feet came into contact with the spilled nitric acid on the ground, causing them to suffer burns. In an attempt to alleviate their pain, they entered a ditch of rain water and nitric acid, resulting in 18 of them dying on the scene. Seven passengers, including the truck's driver, Mustafa Filik, were severely injured and later died at Adapazarı State Hospital.

Among the casualties, there were 17 individuals who sustained injuries, including citizens from the United States and Lebanon, as well as the bus driver Özdemir Süer. The incident was initially responded to by residents of Kargalıhanbaba village and soldiers from the 476th Light Transportation Battalion stationed in Hendek.

== Aftermath ==
After the accident, the bodies of the 18 passengers who entered the nitric acid were buried in a pit dug by villagers 10 meters from the accident site. The funeral ceremony and prayers were conducted by the village imam at the location of the pit. The relatives of the victims erected a memorial tomb named the Traffic Martyrs' Memorial Cemetery at the location of the pit where the bodies were laid.
