= Murat Günel =

Turkish academic

- Born: 1967 (age 58–59)
- Education: Istanbul University (1991) MD, Yale-New Haven Hospital General Surgery(1992) Intern, Yale-New Haven Hospital Neurosurgery (1997) Resident, Yale-New Haven Hospital Neurosurgery (1998) Chief Resident

Murat Günel is a Turkish medical scientist. Dr. Murat Günel, Professor of Neurosurgery, assumed the position of chief of Neurovascular Surgery Program in January 2001. Dr. Günel is a board certified neurosurgeon and is a fellow of the American College of Surgeons. He has special interest in treating brain aneurysms and vascular malformations with special emphasis on arterio-venous malformations and cavernous malformations.

== Honors and recognition ==
- Honorary Doctor of Philosophy Degree, Bahcesehir University, Turkey (2010)
- Honorary Master of Arts Privatim Degree, Yale University (2010)
- Outstanding Scientific Achievement Award, Minister of Health, Turkey (2010)
- Nixdorff-German Professor, Yale University (2009)
- Outstanding Poster Award in Basic Science, 5th Annual Meeting of the AANS/CNS Section of Cerebrovascular Surgery (2002)
- Outstanding Poster Award in Basic Science, 4th Annual Meeting of the AANS/CNS Section of Cerebrovascular Surgery (2001)
- Young Investigator Award, American Epilepsy Society (1999)
- National Pfizer Scholar Award for New Faculty (1998-1999)
- Ohse Research Award-Yale University (1996)
- American College of Surgeons Scholarship (1994-1996)
- Ira Goldenberg Junior Surgical Housestaff Award, Yale University (1992)
