= Zihni Derin =

Turkish agriculturalist

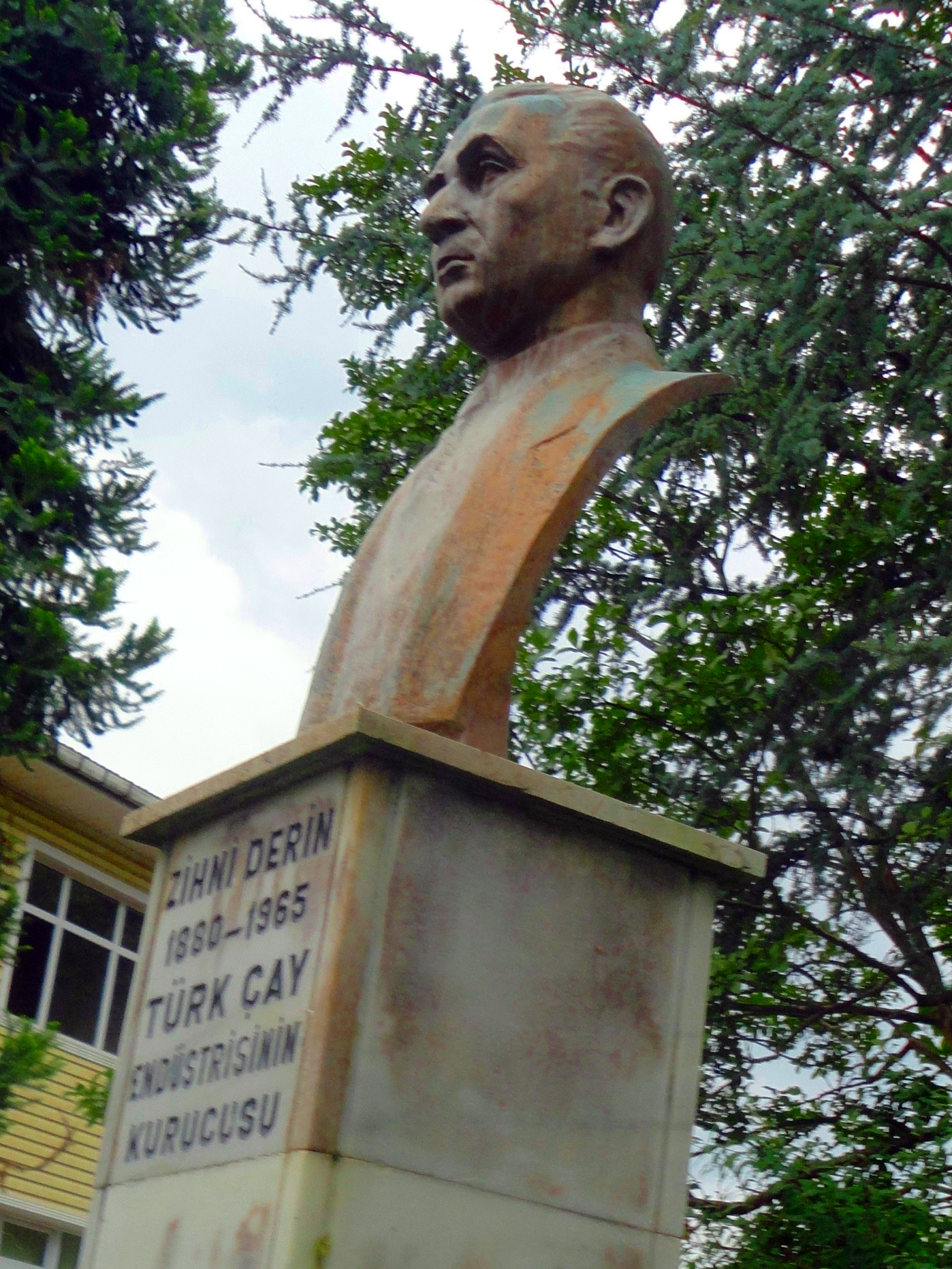
- Born: 1880; Muğla, Ottoman Empire
- Died: 25 August 1965 (aged 84–85); Ankara, Turkey
- Scientific career
- Fields: agronomy

Zihni Derin (1880–1965) was a Turkish agronomist and agriculturalist noted primarily for his pioneering role in tea production in Turkey's eastern Black Sea Region.
