= Road Water Electricity =

Roads, Water Electricity (Turkish: Yol Su Elektrik, abbreviated YSE) was a former Turkish government general directorate responsible for village road construction, waterworks and electrification.

YSE was founded on 1 July 1965 within the Ministry of Village Affairs. In the 1960s the percentage of villages with access to open roads, a water supply network, or electricity was very low. For example, the number of villages with electricity was only 234. YSE was tasked with increasing this percentage.

On 18 June 1984, YSE was merged with two other government corporations to form the Village Works General Directorate. On 16 March 2005, the Village Works General Directorate was abolished.
