= Nedim Ökmen =

Turkish economist and politician (1908–1967)

Personal details
- Born: 1908 Kilis, Ottoman Empire
- Died: 2 February 1967 (aged 58–59) Istanbul, Turkey
- Party: Democrat Party
- Education: Istanbul University

Nedim Ökmen (1908–1967) was a Turkish economist and politician who held various cabinet posts during the premiership of Adnan Menderes in the 1950s.

== Early life and education ==
Ökmen was born in Kilis in 1908. After completing his primary education in his hometown he attended Istanbul High School and graduated in 1927. He received a degree from the Faculty of Political Sciences of Istanbul University. In 1938 he was sent to France for inspection training.

== Career ==
Following his graduation from Istanbul University Ökmen was employed at the Ministry of Finance as an assistant financial inspector. After returning to Turkey in 1933 when he completed his studies in France he continued to work at the ministry and became a financial inspector in 1935. He began to serve as a chief inspector from 1945. His term ended in 1950 when he started his political career being a member of the Democrat Party. He was elected as a deputy from Maraş in the general election held on 14 May 1950. Ökmen was also elected to the Parliament in the general elections in 1954 and 1957 from Gaziantep.

=== Cabinet posts ===
Ökmen was appointed minister of agriculture to the second cabinet of Prime Minister Adnan Menderes on 10 March 1951 and was in office until 9 December 1954. Ökmen held the same post in the next cabinet between 17 May 1954 and 1955.

Ökmen was appointed minister of finance to the Menderes's new cabinet on 9 December 1955. Ökmen resigned from the post in 1956 due to his disagreements with Menderes.

Ökmen was named as the minister of agriculture on 26 December 1957 and was in office until 27 May 1960 when the government was overthrown by a military coup.

== Later years and death ==
Ökmen was arrested along with other Democrat Party politicians following the coup. He was tried by the Supreme Court of Justice in Yassıada and sentenced to twenty years in prison. Ökmen was found guilty due to the cases about the sale of an Afghan hound which had been given by the Afghan King to President Celal Bayar as a gift and about the illegal sale of a land owned by his wife. Due to health problems, he was released from prison on 22 September 1964.

Ökmen died in Istanbul on 2 February 1967.
