= Burhânettin Deran =

- Born: 1902; Ottoman Empire
- Died: 9 March 1965 (aged 62–63) Istanbul, Turkey
- Genres: Ottoman classical music, Turkish makam music
- Occupation(s): composer, lyrics author

Burhânettin Deran (1902 – 9 March 1965) was a Turkish composer and qanun performer. He is the father of painter Erol Deran. He is buried in the Kozlu Cemetery in Istanbul.

== See also ==
- List of composers of classical Turkish music
