= 28th government of Turkey =

Government of the Republic of Turkey (1963-1965)

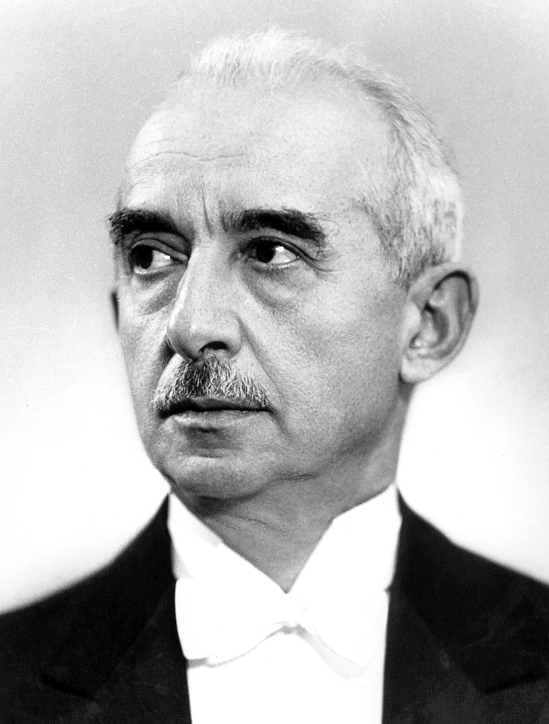
İsmet İnönü

The 28th government of Turkey (25 December 1963 – 20 February 1965) is the third coalition government of Turkey. The prime minister, İsmet İnönü, was the leader of Republican People's Party (CHP) and a former president.

== Background ==
After the two coalitions, two coup attempts following the 1960 Turkish coup d'état, and a defeat in by elections, İsmet İnönü formed his third coalition with independents in the parliament. His support was fragile, but New Turkey Party, which was not a part of the government, promised to support the government.

== The government ==
Some of the cabinet members were changed during the lifespan of the cabinet. In the list below, the serving period of cabinet members who served only a part of the cabinet's lifespan are shown in the column "Notes".

Title	Name	Party	Notes
Prime Minister	İsmet İnönü	CHP	
Deputy Prime Minister	Kemal Satır	CHP	
Minister of State
Minister of State	Malik Yolaç	Indep.	
Minister of State	İbrahim Saffet Omay	CHP	
Minister of State	Vefik Pirinççioğlu	CHP	15 December 1963 – 13 March 1964
Minister of State	Nuvit Yetkin	CHP	13 March 1964 – 20 February 1965
Ministry of Justice
Ministry of Justice	Sedat Çumralı	CHP	25 December 1963 – 15 December 1964
Ministry of Justice	Sırrı Atalay	CHP	15 December 1964 – 29 February 1965
Ministry of National Defense	İlhami Sancar	CHP	
Ministry of the Interior	Orhan Öztrak	CHP	
Ministry of Foreign Affairs	Feridun Cemal Erkin	Indep	
Ministry of Finance	Ferit Melen	Indep.	
Ministry of National Education	İbrahim Ökten	CHP	
Ministry of Transport
Ministry of Transport	Ferit Alpiskender	CHP	25 December 1963 – 15 December 1964
Ministry of Transport	Mahmut Vural	CHP	15 December 1964 – 20 February 1965
Ministry of Monopolies	Mehmet Yüceler	CHP	
Ministry of Industry	Muammer Erten	CHP	
Ministry of Agriculture	Turan Şahin	CHP	
Ministry of Commerce	Fenni İslimyeli	CHP	
Ministry of Tourism	Ali İhsan Göğüş	CHP	
Ministry of Construction and Settlement
Ministry of Construction and Settlement	Celalettin Uzer	CHP	25 December 1963 – 15 December 1964
Ministry of Construction and Settlement	Sadık Kutlay	CHP	15 December 1964 – 20 February 1965
Ministry of Village Affairs	Lebit Yurdoğlu	CHP	
Ministry of Public Works	Arif Hikmet Onat	CHP	
Ministry of Health and Social Security	Kemal Demir	CHP	
Ministry of Labour and Social Security	Bülent Ecevit	CHP	
Ministry of Energy and Natural Resources	Hüdai Oral	CHP	

== Aftermath ==
On 13 February 1965, the four opposition parties (including YTP) overthrew the government by rejecting the annual budget of the government. On 20 February, they formed a caretaker government.

Preceded by 27th government of Turkey (İsmet İnönü)	28th Government of Turkey; 25 December 1963 – 20 February 1965	Succeeded by 29th government of Turkey (Suat Hayri Ürgüplü)
