= Ekrem Alican =

Turkish politician (1916–2000)

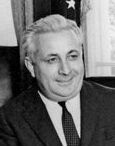

Deputy Prime Minister
- In office June 25, 1962 – December 25, 1963
- Prime Minister: İsmet İnönü
- Preceded by: Akif Eyidoğan
- Succeeded by: Kemal Satır

Minister of Finance
- In office May 30, 1960 – December 26, 1960
- Prime Minister: Cemal Gürsel
- Preceded by: Hasan Polatkan
- Succeeded by: Kemal Kurdaş

Personal details
- Born: 1916 Adapazarı, Hüdavendigâr vilayet, Ottoman Empire
- Died: June 18, 2000 (aged 83–84) Istanbul, Turkey
- Party: Democrat Party (1950–1955); Liberty Party (1955–1958); New Turkey Party (1961–1966)
- Spouse: Naciye (Güler) Alican
- Children: Emine Nilüfer (daughter), Canan (daughter), Yusuf (son)
- Education: Finance
- Alma mater: Faculty of Political Science, Ankara University
- Occupation: Politician, civil servant

Ekrem Alican (1916 – June 18, 2000) was a Turkish politician, government minister and party leader.

== Early years ==
Alican was born in 1916 in Adapazarı in the Hüdavendigâr vilayet of the Ottoman Empire (now Sakarya Province of Turkey) to Yusuf Efendi, a third generation Circassian immigrant from Caucasus, and Emine Hanım. He had two elder brothers, Fuat and İsmail Hakkı. After finishing the junior high school in Adapazarı in 1930, he enrolled at Şişli Terakki High School in Nişantaşı, Istanbul as a boarding student. In 1934, Ekrem Alican graduated from the high school, and entered the higher education institute named (Ottoman Turkish: Mekteb-i Mülkiye), where he studied Finance. (Although this institute was in Istanbul, 1936 it moved to Ankara to be named Faculty of Political Science, Ankara University.) He completed his higher education in 1937, and was sent to London School of Economics for further studies on scholarship by the Ministry of Finance. Due to the outbreak of World War II, he had to return home one and half years later.

Ekrem Alican entered the service of Ministry of Finance as an assistant inspector. Between 1940 and 1941, he fulfilled the compulsory military service as a lieutenant of artillery at Çanakkale. After the end of the World War II, the Ministry wanted to send him again to London, however he could not convince his father, who was happy with his son's employment at the Ministry. Some time later, he was promoted to the post of an inspector. In 1946, he was called to the military service again for a short time.

On May 29, 1946, he and Naciye Güler, an 18-year-old native of his hometown, got engaged. The couple married on May 19, 1947. The family had three children, daughters Emine Nilüfer (born in 1948), Canan (born in 1951) and son Yusuf (born in 1958).

Right after completion of his second military time, Ekrem Alican resigned from his post at the Ministry after seven years of service, and returned to his hometown. He and his three other relatives established a firm in the trade of agricultural products. The firm however was short-living.

== Political life ==
At the age of 34, Ekrem Alican entered Democrat Party (DP), and was elected deputy of Kocaeli in the 1950 general elections. The family moved then to Ankara. In 1951, Alican stood up for the building of a sugar refinery in Adapazarı, which was highly needed in the region. It was completed and went in production in 1953.

Even though he developed inner-party controversies that began already in 1952, he ran for the 1954 elections and kept his seat in the parliament. In 1955, following the Istanbul riots that took place on September 6–7, some leading party members expressed harsh criticism on the government, and demanded the implementation of the "right to prove" (Turkish: ispat hakkı) into the criminal law regarding suppression of press freedom that led to growing inner-party opposition. The disciplinary board of the party expelled then nine members. Ten members followed their colleagues discharged and resigned. The 19 politicians decided to establish a political party, which was realized on December 20, 1955, under the name Liberty Party) (Turkish: Hürriyet Partisi, HP). Ekrem Alican, among the co-founders, became the third party leader after Ekrem Hayri Üstündağ and Fevzi Lütfi Karaosmanoğlu.

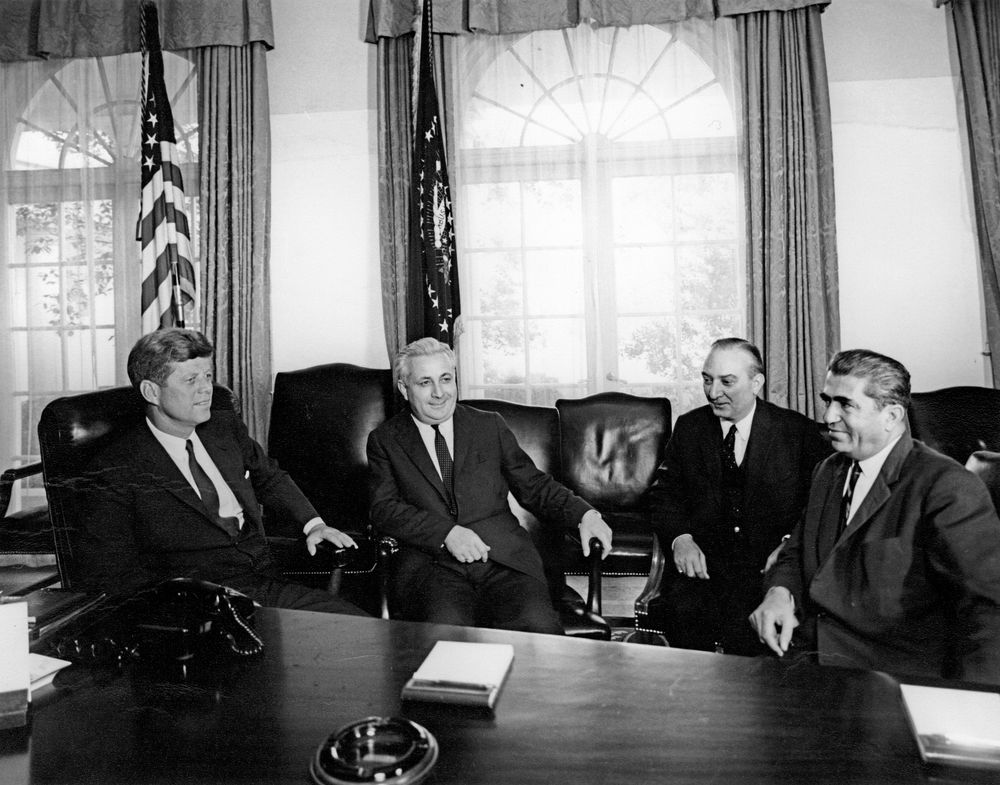
Alican with U.S. President John F. Kennedy, Turkish ambassador Turgut Menemencioğlu and Turkish Minister of Finance Ferit Melen in White House, Washington, D.C.

The outcome of the advanced 1957 elections held on October 27 was a disappointment for the HP, which could secure four seats in the parliament only while Alican was not elected. At the party congress on November 24, 1958, the party dissolved itself. While most of the members joined the main opposition Republican People's Party, Ekrem Alican did not go with.

Right after the military coup of 1960 on May 27 that overturned the government of Democrat Party, he was appointed Minister of Finance by the National Unity Committee, the junta on May 30. Alican resigned from the cabinet on December 26, 1960, due to disputes over financial politics with the militaries.

He founded the New Turkey Party (Turkish: Yeni Türkiye Partisi, YTP) on February 13, 1961, as one of the two newly established major parties, which aimed to attract the votes of the banned Democratic Party. Alican became leader of the party. In the 1961 general elections held on October 15, the YTP could achieve only a modest 13.73% of the votes resulting in 65 seats of the total 450 in the parliament, and in the 1961 senate elections on the same day, Alican's party sent 27 senators of the 150 to the Senate by 13,0% of the total votes. He was elected deputy of Sakarya Province, incorporating his hometown Adapazarı.

Ekrem Alican was appointed deputy prime minister in the coalition cabinet of Republican Perty's leader İsmet İnönü serving from June 25, 1962, to December 25, 1963. He was re-elected deputy of Sakarya in the 1965 elections held on October 10. The YTP sent 19 deputies into the 450-seat parliament. On October 17, 1966, he resigned from his position as party leader, and stepped back from active politics in 1969.

== Later years and death ==
Between 1970 and 1980, Ekrem Alican served as the chairman of the board at the Yapı ve Kredi Bankası, one of the major private banks in Turkey.

He died on June 18, 2000, at the age of 84 in his home at Yeniköy, Istanbul. Following a religious ceremony at the Teşvikiye Mosque, he was laid to rest in the family cemetery at İkice Müslim village in Adapazarı. He was survived by his wife and three children.

Preceded by Hasan Polatkan	Ministry of Finance; 30 May 1960 – 26 December 1960	Succeeded by Kemal Kurdaş
Preceded by Akif Eyidoğan	Deputy Prime Minister; 25 June 1962 – 25 December 1963	Succeeded by Kemal Satır
Preceded by newly established	Leader of New Turkey Party; 13 February 1961 – 17 October 1966	Succeeded by Yusuf Azizoğlu
