= 13th Parliament of Turkey =

The 13th Grand National Assembly of Turkey existed from 10 October 1965 to 12 October 1969. There were 456 MPs in the lower house. The majority of the MPs were the members of Justice Party (AP). The main opposition Party was the Republican People's Party (CHP). Other parties were the Nation Party (MP), the New Turkey Party (YTP), the Workers Party (TİP), and the Republican Villagers Nation Party (CKMP).

== Main parliamentary milestones ==
Some of the important events in the history of the parliament include the following:

- 27 October 1965– Süleyman Demirel of AP formed the 30th government of Turkey
- 26 March 1966 – Upon Cemal Gürsel’s illness, Cevdet Sunay was elected as the 5th president of Turkey
- 7 May 1966 – Police investigation in parliament building caused protests
- 3 August 1966-Law 780:Amnesty Law
- 17 October 1966 – Unity Party (BP) was founded
- 12 May 1967 – Reliance Party (GP) was founded by MPs issued from CHP
- 1 March 1968 –Change in election system (End of National remnant system)
- 12 October 1969 –General elections

Preceded by 12th Parliament of Turkey	13th Parliament of Turkey; Ferruh Bozbeyli; 10 October 1965-12 October 1969	Succeeded by 14th Parliament of Turkey
