= 12th Parliament of Turkey =

Parliament of Turkey (1961–1965)

The 12th Grand National Assembly of Turkey existed from 15 October 1961 to 1 October 1965. Actually there is one other parliament between the 11th Parliament of Turkey and the 12th parliament of Turkey, the Constituent Assembly of Turkey. However, the members of the chamber of deputies in 1960–61 term were appointed members rather than elected members and usually chamber of deputies is not included in the list of the parliaments in Turkey. According to the new constitution, there were two houses in the parliament. There were 450 MPs in the lower house; Republican People's Party (CHP) with 173 MPs, Justice Party (AP) with 158 MPs, New Turkey Party (YTP) with 65 MPs and Republican Villagers Nation Party with 54 MPs. Since no party was able to win the majority of seats, this term witnessed four coalition governments.

== Main parliamentary milestones ==
Some of the important events in the history of the parliament are the following:

- 26 October 1961 – Cemal Gürsel was elected as the fourth president of Turkey
- 26 October 1961 – Fuat Sirmen of CHP was elected as the speaker of the Turkish parliament
- 20 November – İsmet İnönü of CHP formed the 26th government of Turkey (CHP-AP coalition)
- 22 February 1962 – Attempted coup by Talat Aydemir
- 10 May 1962 – Pardon for 22 February activists (They were expelled from the army, but no other punishment)
- 15 June 1962 – A group of CKMP MPs under the leadership of Osman Bölükbaşı founded another party named Nation Party (MP)
- 26 June 1962 – İsmet İnönü formed the 27th government of Turkey (CHP-YTP-CKMP coalition)
- 21 May 1963 – A second attempted coup by Talat Aydemir
- 25 December 1963- İsmet İnönü formed the 28th government of Turkey (CHP Independents coalition)
- 16 March 1964 – Parliament authorized the government for a possible intervention to Cyprus
- 23 June 1964 – Law 480: Verdicts for the 22 May activist were ratified by the parliament (Unlile the former attempted coup the activists were severely punished.)
- 20 February 1965 – Suat Hayri Ürgüplü an independent member and former speaker of the Turkish Senate formed the 29th government of Turkey (AP-YTP-CKMP and MP coalition)
- 10 October 1965- General elections

Preceded by Constituent Assembly of Turkey (Note: Including MBK period)	12th Parliament of Turkey; Fuat Sirmen; 15 October 1961-10 October 1965	Succeeded by 13th Parliament of Turkey
