= List of main opposition leaders of Turkey =

Main Opposition Leader
- Ana Muhalefet Lideri
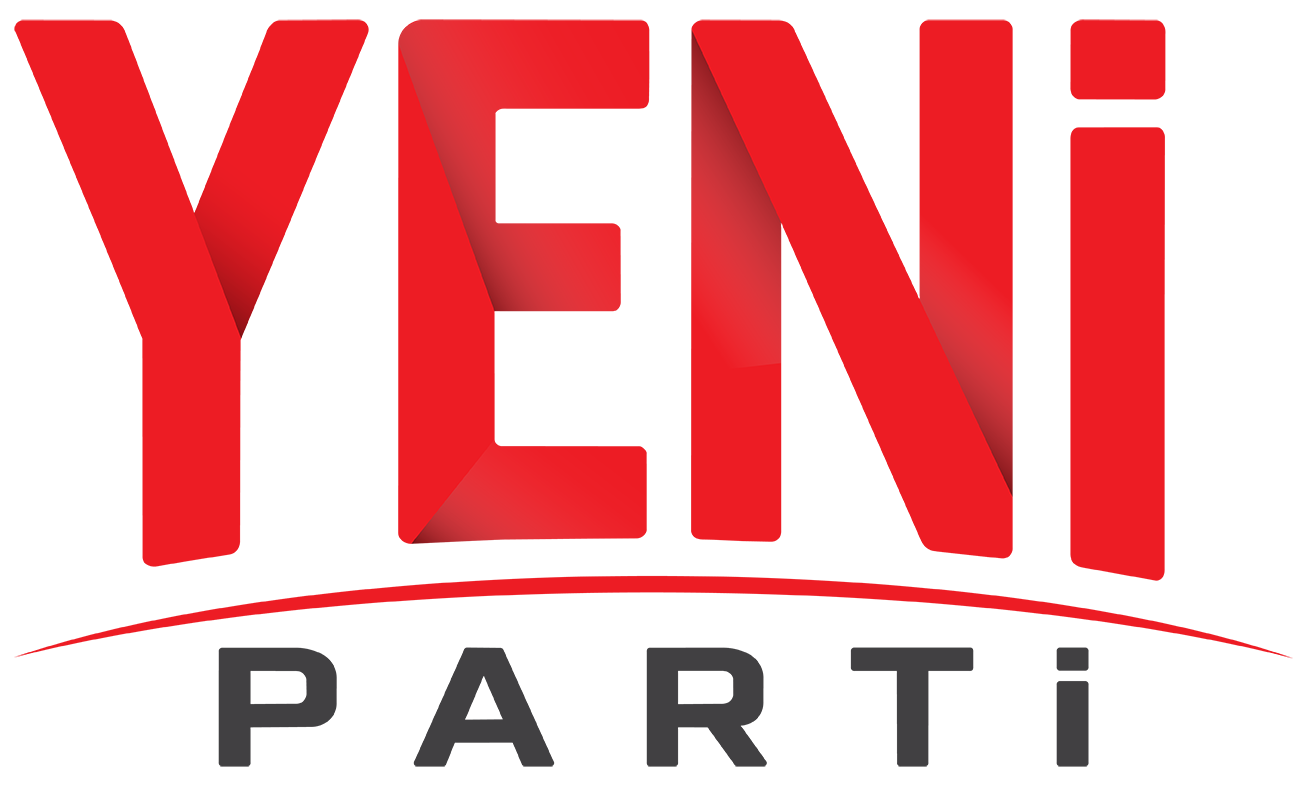

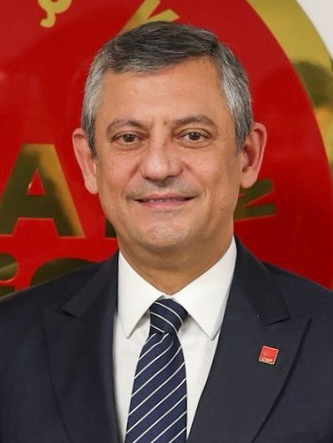
- Incumbent; Özgür Özel since 24 July 2026
- Residence: No official residence
- Appointer: Largest political party in the Grand National Assembly that is not in the cabinet
- Term length: While leader of the largest political party in the Grand National Assembly that is not in the cabinet
- Inaugural holder: Kâzım Karabekir (One-party period); Celâl Bayar (Multi-party period)
- Formation: 17 October 1924 (One-party period); 7 January 1946 (Multi-party period)

This article lists the individuals to have served as Main Opposition Leader of Turkey (Turkish: Ana Muhalefet Lideri), since the inception of the republican period in 1923. The Main Opposition Leader is the leader of the largest political party in the Grand National Assembly that is not in cabinet.

Except for two brief periods (1924–25 and 1930), there were no opposition leaders in the one-party period. Furthermore, there were no opposition leaders during the periods of military dictatorships in the multi-party period (1960–61 and 1980–83).

The Main Opposition Leader is a senior government official of Turkey, representing the state as the fourth most authoritative person, as per the order of precedence. It supersedes the Constitutional Court judges, cabinet ministers, and top military generals. The Turkish National Police provides dignitary protection for the incumbent holder of office.

== List ==
No.	Portrait	Name (Birth–Death)	Party	Term of office			Head of government
No.	Portrait	Name (Birth–Death)	Party	Took office	Left office	Time in office	Head of government
One-party period
1		Kâzım Karabekir (1882–1948)	Progressive Republican Party (TCF)	17 October 1924	3 June 1925	229 days	İsmet İnönü; Fethi Okyar
Office vacant (3 June 1925 – 12 August 1930)
2		Fethi Okyar (1880–1943)	Liberal Republican Party (SCF)	12 August 1930	17 November 1930	97 days	İsmet İnönü
Office vacant (17 November 1930 – 7 January 1946)
Multi-party period
3		Celâl Bayar (1883–1986)	Democrat Party (DP)	7 January 1946	14 May 1950	4 years, 127 days	Şükrü Saracoğlu; Recep Peker; Hasan Saka; Şemsettin Günaltay
4		İsmet İnönü (1884–1973)	Republican People's Party (CHP)	22 May 1950	27 May 1960	10 years, 5 days	Adnan Menderes
Office vacant (27 May 1960 – 20 November 1961)
5		Ekrem Alican (1916–2000)	New Turkey Party (YTP)	20 November 1961	25 June 1962	217 days	İsmet İnönü
6		Ragıp Gümüşpala (1897–1964)	Justice Party (AP)	25 June 1962	6 June 1964	1 year, 347 days	İsmet İnönü
7		Süleyman Demirel (1924–2015)	Justice Party (AP)	6 June 1964	20 February 1965	259 days	İsmet İnönü
8 (4)		İsmet İnönü (1884–1973)	Republican People's Party (CHP)	20 February 1965	26 March 1971	6 years, 34 days	Suat Hayri Ürgüplü; Süleyman Demirel
9 (7)		Süleyman Demirel (1924–2015)	Justice Party (AP)	26 January 1974	17 November 1974	295 days	Bülent Ecevit
10		Bülent Ecevit (1925–2006)	Republican People's Party (CHP)	31 March 1975	21 June 1977	2 years, 82 days	Süleyman Demirel
11 (7)		Süleyman Demirel (1924–2015)	Justice Party (AP)	21 June 1977	21 July 1977	30 days	Bülent Ecevit
12 (10)		Bülent Ecevit (1925–2006)	Republican People's Party (CHP)	21 July 1977	5 January 1978	168 days	Süleyman Demirel
13 (7)		Süleyman Demirel (1924–2015)	Justice Party (AP)	5 January 1978	12 November 1979	1 year, 311 days	Bülent Ecevit
14 (10)		Bülent Ecevit (1925–2006)	Republican People's Party (CHP)	12 November 1979	12 September 1980	305 days	Süleyman Demirel
Office vacant (12 September 1980 – 13 December 1983)
15		Necdet Calp (1922–1998)	Populist Party (HP)	13 December 1983	27 June 1985	1 year, 196 days	Turgut Özal
16		Aydın Güven Gürkan (1941–2006)	Populist Party (HP)	27 June 1985	3 November 1985	337 days	Turgut Özal
16		Aydın Güven Gürkan (1941–2006)	Social Democrat Populist Party (SHP)	3 November 1985	30 May 1986	337 days	Turgut Özal
17		Erdal İnönü (1926–2007)	Social Democrat Populist Party (SHP)	30 May 1986	20 November 1991	5 years, 174 days	Turgut Özal; Yıldırım Akbulut; Mesut Yılmaz
18		Mesut Yılmaz (1947–2020)	Motherland Party (ANAP)	21 November 1991	6 March 1996	4 years, 106 days	Süleyman Demirel; Tansu Çiller
19		Necmettin Erbakan (1926–2011)	Welfare Party (RP)	6 March 1996	28 June 1996	114 days	Mesut Yılmaz
20 (18)		Mesut Yılmaz (1947–2020)	Motherland Party (ANAP)	28 June 1996	30 June 1997	1 year, 2 days	Necmettin Erbakan
21 (19)		Necmettin Erbakan (1926–2011)	Welfare Party (RP)	30 June 1997	17 December 1997	170 days	Mesut Yılmaz
22		İsmail Alptekin (born 1943)	Virtue Party (FP)	17 December 1997	14 May 1998	148 days	Mesut Yılmaz
23		Recai Kutan (1930–2024)	Virtue Party (FP)	14 May 1998	22 June 2001	3 years, 39 days	Mesut Yılmaz; Bülent Ecevit
24		Tansu Çiller (born 1946)	True Path Party (DYP)	22 June 2001	19 November 2002	1 year, 150 days	Bülent Ecevit
25		Deniz Baykal (1938–2023)	Republican People's Party (CHP)	19 November 2002	22 May 2010	7 years, 184 days	Abdullah Gül; Recep Tayyip Erdoğan
26		Kemal Kılıçdaroğlu (born 1948)	Republican People's Party (CHP)	22 May 2010	5 November 2023	13 years, 167 days	Recep Tayyip Erdoğan; Ahmet Davutoğlu; Binali Yıldırım
27		Özgür Özel (born 1974)	Republican People's Party (CHP)	8 November 2023	21 May 2026 (Note: Removed from office by interim injunction of the 36th Civil Chamber of the Ankara Regional Court of Justice, which declared the 38th CHP Ordinary Convention null and void. Özel contests the ruling; appeal to the Court of Cassation pending.)	2 years, 194 days	Recep Tayyip Erdoğan
28 (26)		Kemal Kılıçdaroğlu (born 1948)	Republican People's Party (CHP)	21 May 2026 (Note: Reinstated on an interim basis by court order. His reinstatement is disputed by Özel and the CHP executive board; the status of the leadership is subject to ongoing litigation before the Court of Cassation.)	24 July 2026	64 days	Recep Tayyip Erdoğan
29 (27)		Özgür Özel (born 1974)	New Party (YEP)	24 July 2026	Incumbent	53 days	Recep Tayyip Erdoğan

== See also ==
- Politics of Turkey
- Government of Turkey
- Grand National Assembly of Turkey
  - Speaker of the Grand National Assembly
