= New Turkey Party (1961) =

Former political party in Turkey

- Abbreviation: YTP
- Founder: Ekrem Alican
- Founded: 13 February 1961
- Dissolved: 10 March 1973
- Preceded by: Democrat Party; Liberty Party
- Succeeded by: Justice Party
- Ideology: Liberal conservatism
- Political position: Centre-right

New Turkey Party (Turkish: Yeni Türkiye Partisi, YTP) was a Turkish political party.

== Background ==
The Democrat Party was the ruling party of Turkey between 1950 and 1960; however, it was closed by the military rule in 1960. In 1961, a number of new parties were founded to fill the political gap of Democrat Party. New Turkey Party was one of them.

== Foundation of the party ==
The founder of the party was Ekrem Alican, a former Democrat Party deputy prior to 1957 . He had also worked for the military rule as a Minister of Finance. The party was founded on 13 February 1961. Other important figures in the party were Yüksel Menderes (Adnan Menderes' son), Aydın Yalçın (academician), Fahrettin Kerim Gökay (former Istanbul mayor) and Yusuf Azizoğlu, (MD and former Silvan mayor).

== Political history ==
In the elections held on 15 October 1961, the party received 13.7% of all votes and gained 65 seats in the lower house of the parliament. It was the third party in terms of the seats and fourth party in terms of the votes. The party participated in the 27th government of Turkey (also known as the second coalition government) in which Ekrem Alican was the deputy prime minister between 25 January 1962 and 25 December 1963. In the elections held on 10 October 1965 YTP received only 3.7% of votes and gained 19 seats. In the elections held on 12 October 1969, the vote percentage of votes further dropped to 2.2%.

== Conclusion ==
In 1973, the party ceased to exist. The remaining members transferred to other parties - most notably to the Justice Party.
