= 1934 in Turkey =

- Decades: 1920s; 1930s; 1940s; 1950s
- See also: List of years in Turkey

Events in the year 1934 in Turkey.

== Parliament ==
- 4th Parliament of Turkey

== Incumbents ==
- President – Kemal Atatürk
- Prime Minister – İsmet İnönü

== Ruling party and the main opposition ==
- Ruling party – Republican People's Party (CHP)

== Cabinet ==
- 7th government of Turkey

== Events ==
- 9 February – Balkan Pact
- 4 March – Ankara Radio began broadcasting
- 14 June – Resettlement Law
- 21 June – Surname Law
- 24 November – Atatürk surname for Mustafa Kemal
- 5 December – Women's suffrage (general and local elections)

== Births ==
- 21 February – Aytekin Kotil, politician (d. 1992)
- 5 March – Halit Refiğ, movie director (d. 2009)
- 23 April – Fikret Hakan, actor (d. 2017)
- 30 March – Mahmut Atalay, wrestler (d. 2004)
- 2 August – Oktay Sinanoğlu, academic, chemist (d. 2015)
- 10 August – Tevfik Kış, wrestler (d. 2019)
- 21 August – İzzet Günay, actor
- 22 August – Ayla Erduran, violinist (d. 2025)
- 20 September – Hamit Kaplan, wrestler (d. 1976)

== Deaths ==
- 5 March – Reşit Galip, MD, politician
- 15 April – Kemalettin Sami (born in 1884), retired general
- 29 June – Zaro Aga (born in 1777), allegedly the World's oldest man

== Gallery ==
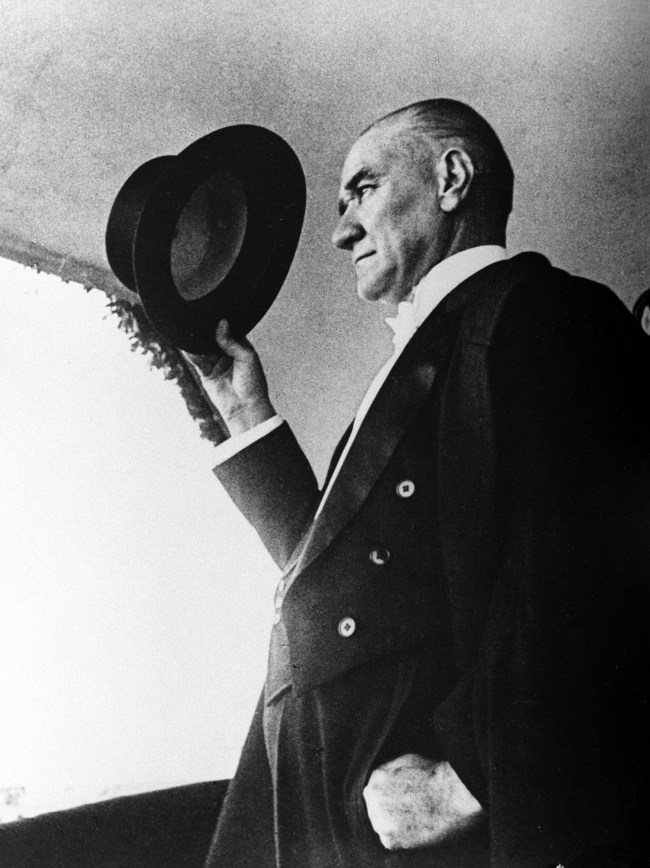
Kemal Atatürk

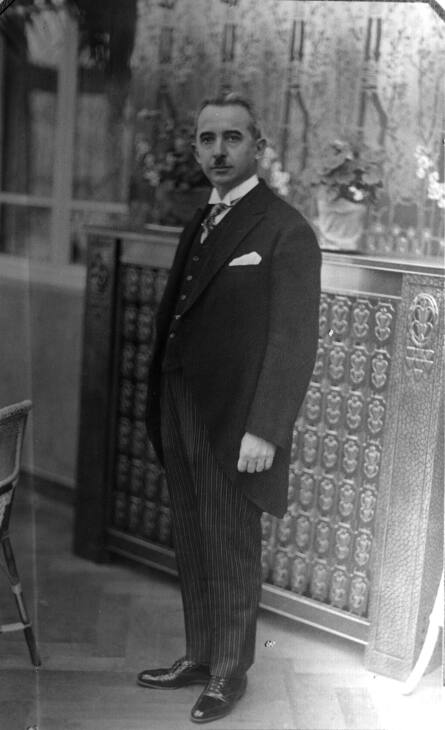
İsmet İnönü

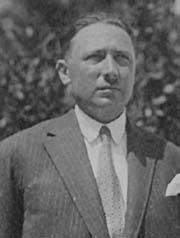
Reşit Galip

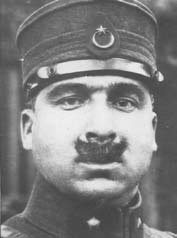
Kemalettin Sami

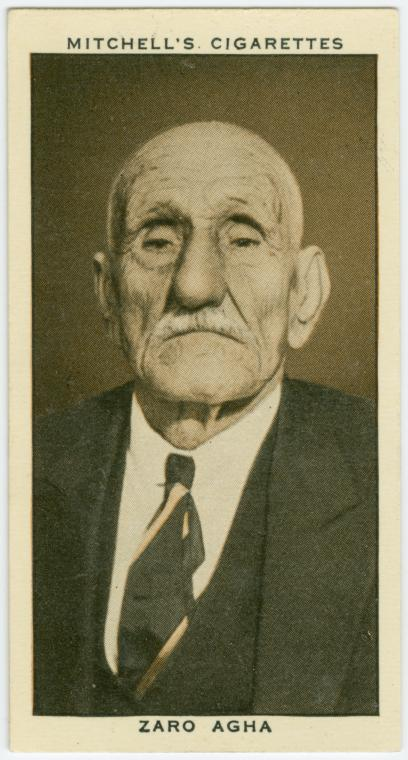
Zaro Ağa
