= 1931 in Turkey =

- Centuries: 20th; 21st
- Decades: 1920s; 1930s; 1940s; 1950s
- See also: List of years in Turkey

Events in the year 1931 in Turkey.

== Parliament ==
- 3rd Parliament of Turkey (up to 4 May)
- 4th Parliament of Turkey (from 4 May)

== Incumbents ==
- President – Kemal Atatürk
- Prime Minister – İsmet İnönü

== Ruling party and the main opposition ==
- Ruling party – Republican People's Party (CHP)

== Cabinet ==
- 6th government of Turkey (up to 5 May)
- 7th government of Turkey (from 5 May)

== Events ==
- 26 March – International measurements were legalized
- 15 April – Turkish Historical Society was founded
- 4 May – General elections
- 5 May –

Kemal Atatürk was reelected as the president
İsmet İnönü formed his new cabinet

== Births ==
- 4 January – Coşkun Özarı, football coach
- 27 January – Gazanfer Özcan theatre actor
- 28 January – Naci Erdem, footballer
- 5 July – Selahattin Beyazıt, businessman
- 7 July – Talat Sait Halman, politician and man of letters
- 10 September – Ece Ayhan, poet
- 6 December – Zeki Müren, singer

== Deaths ==
- 3 March – Hasan İzzet Pasha (born in 1871), Ottoman general
- 31 July – Çürüksulu Mahmud Pasha (born in 1864), Ottoman admiral and politician
- 15 September – Seniha Sultan (born in 1852), Ottoman princess
- 5 October – Selma Rıza (Feraceli), first Turkish female journalist
- 15 October – Veysel Özgür (born in 1877), military officer
- 23 December – Mehmet Rauf (born in 1875), novelist

== Gallery ==
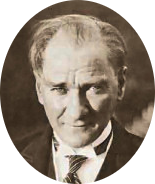
Kemal Atatürk

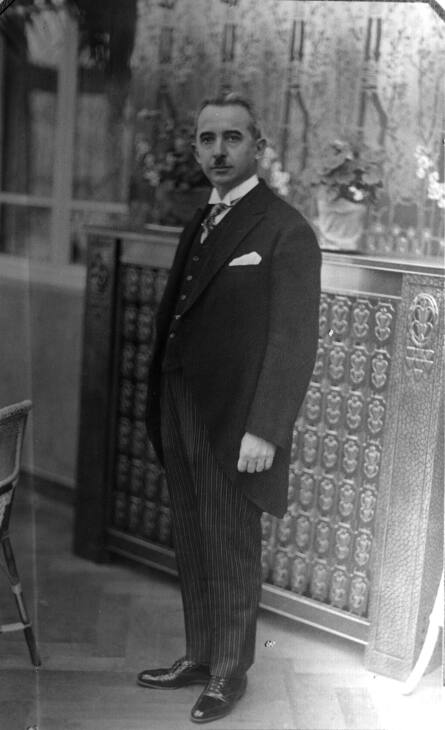
İsmet İnönü

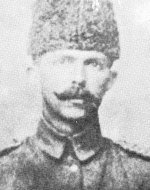
Hasan İzzet Pasha

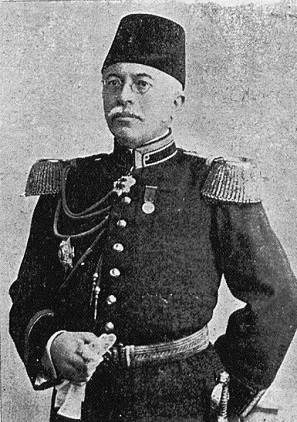
Çürüksulu Mahmut Pasha

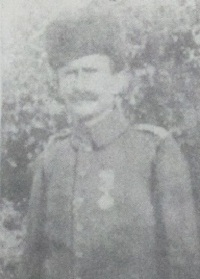
Veysel Özgür
