= 1926 in Turkey =

- Centuries: 20th; 21st
- Decades: 1920s; 1930s; 1940s
- See also: List of years in Turkey

Events in the year 1926 in Turkey.

== Parliament ==
- 2nd Parliament of Turkey

== Incumbents ==
- President – Kemal Atatürk
- Prime Minister – İsmet İnönü

== Ruling party and the main opposition ==
- Ruling party – Republican People's Party (CHP)

== Cabinet ==
- 4th government of Turkey

== Events ==
- 1 January –Turkey began using international calendar and timing instead of the traditional one
- 17 February – Civil code
- 1 March – Modern criminal code
- 18 March – A magnitude 6.9 earthquake, with a maximum intensity of VIII (Severe), occurs in the Mediterranean Sea southwest of Kaş in the Antalya Province. Some people are killed.
- 11 April – Partial mobilization as a precaution after a speech of Italian dictator Benito Mussolini
- 19 April – Modern Cabotage law
- 22 April – Modern Obligations code
- 29 May – Modern Commercial code
- 5 June – Treaty concerning the future of Mosul (Which was a part of Turkey at the end of World War I but annexed by the United Kingdom during the armistice day following the war.)
- 12 June - A travelling exhibition departed from Istanbul on SS Karadeniz,
- 15 June – A plot to assassinate Mustafa Kemal was uncovered in İzmir
- 20 June – Crisis between the prime minister İsmet İnönü and the special court about the court's right to arrest of Kazım Karabekir who was an MP. (Mustafa Kemal mediated and the crisis ended on the 5th of July)
- 2 August – The French S.S. Lotus collided with the Turkish S.S. Bozkurt.
- 5 September - SS Karadeniz returned home after visiting 15 ports in 12 European countries in 86 days and 22 hours,
- 6 October – First airplane factory in Kayseri
- 12 October – Lotus issue was brought to international courts (see 2 August)
- 22 October – The 6.0 M_{s} Kars earthquake occurs with a maximum Mercalli intensity of IX (Violent). The shock was close to the border and affected both Turkey and Armenia, leaving 360 people dead

== Births ==
- 15 February – Doğan Güreş, chief of staff
- 28 February – Erol Taş, actor
- 6 June – Erdal İnönü, physics professor, politician
- 22 August – Ümit Yaşar Oğuzcan, poet
- 5 September – Süleyman Seba longest presiding Chairman of Beşiktaş J.K. sports club
- 29 October – Necmettin Erbakan, prime minister (54th government of Turkey)

== Deaths ==
- 12 July – Ziya Hurşit (born in 1892), politician
- 13 July – Rüştü Pasha (born in 1872), retired general and politician
- 26 August – Mehmet Cavit Bey (born in 1875), politician, economist
- 26 August – Nazım Bey (born in 1870), MD and politician

== Gallery ==
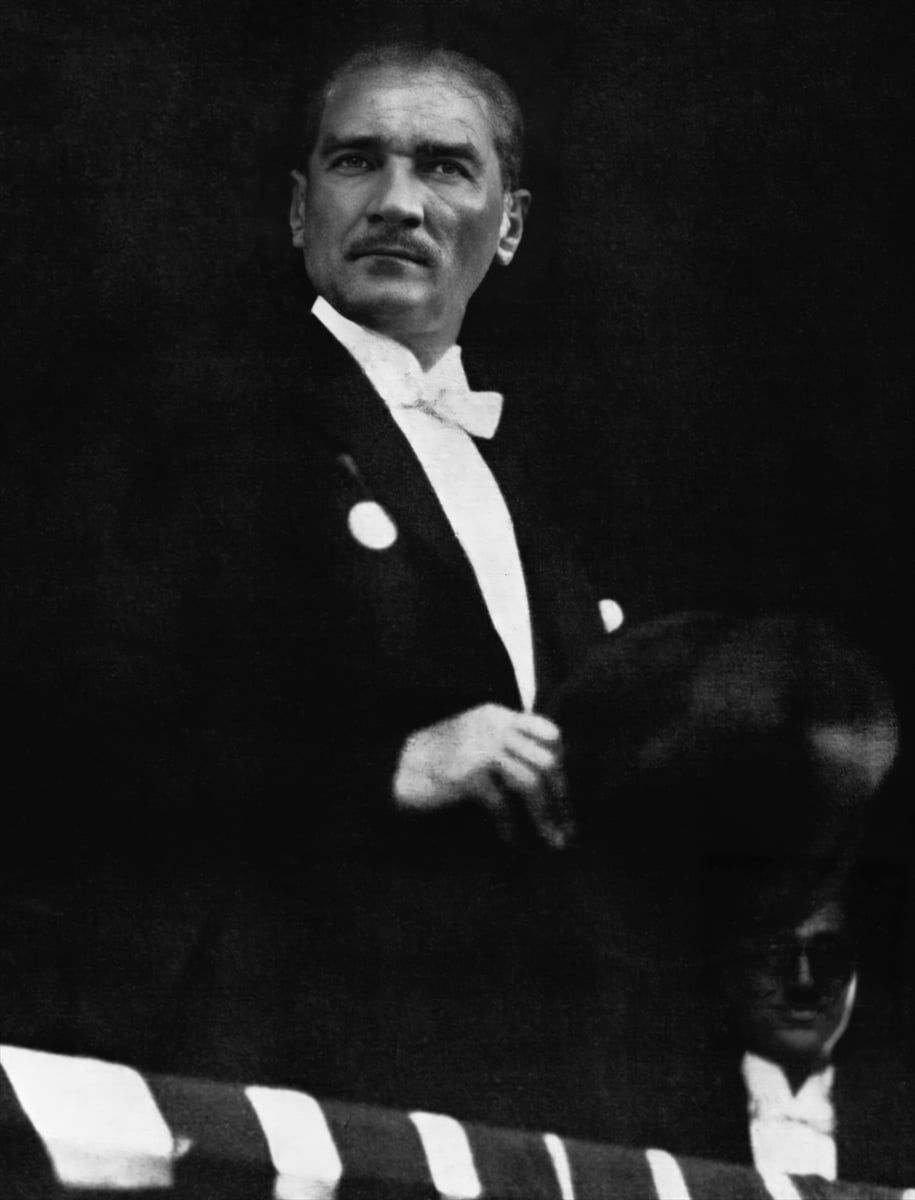
Kemal Atatürk

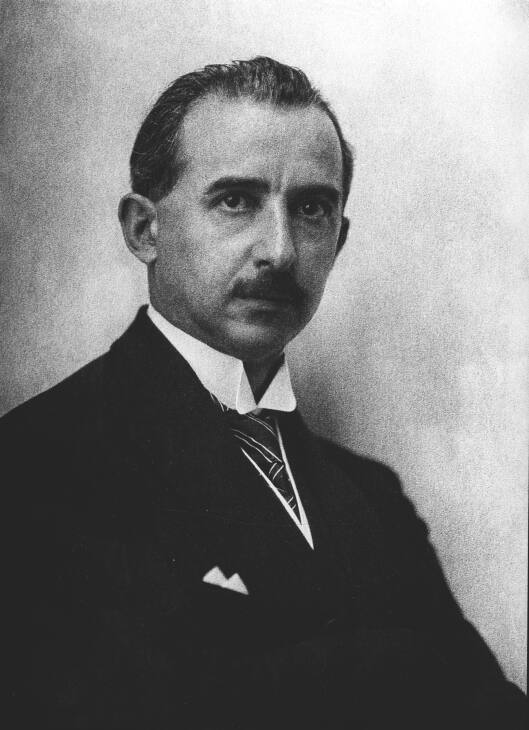
İsmet İnönü

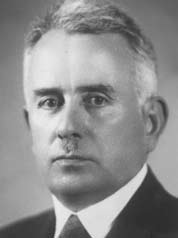
Kazım Karabekir

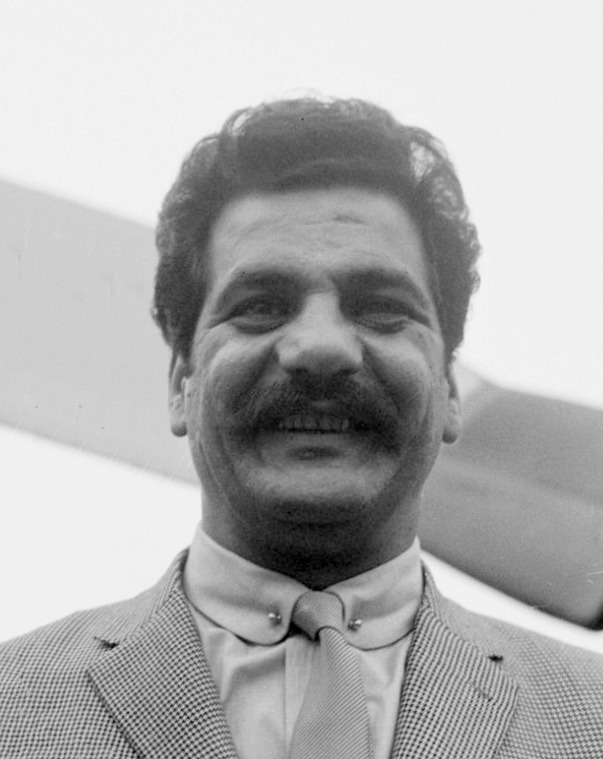
Erol Taş

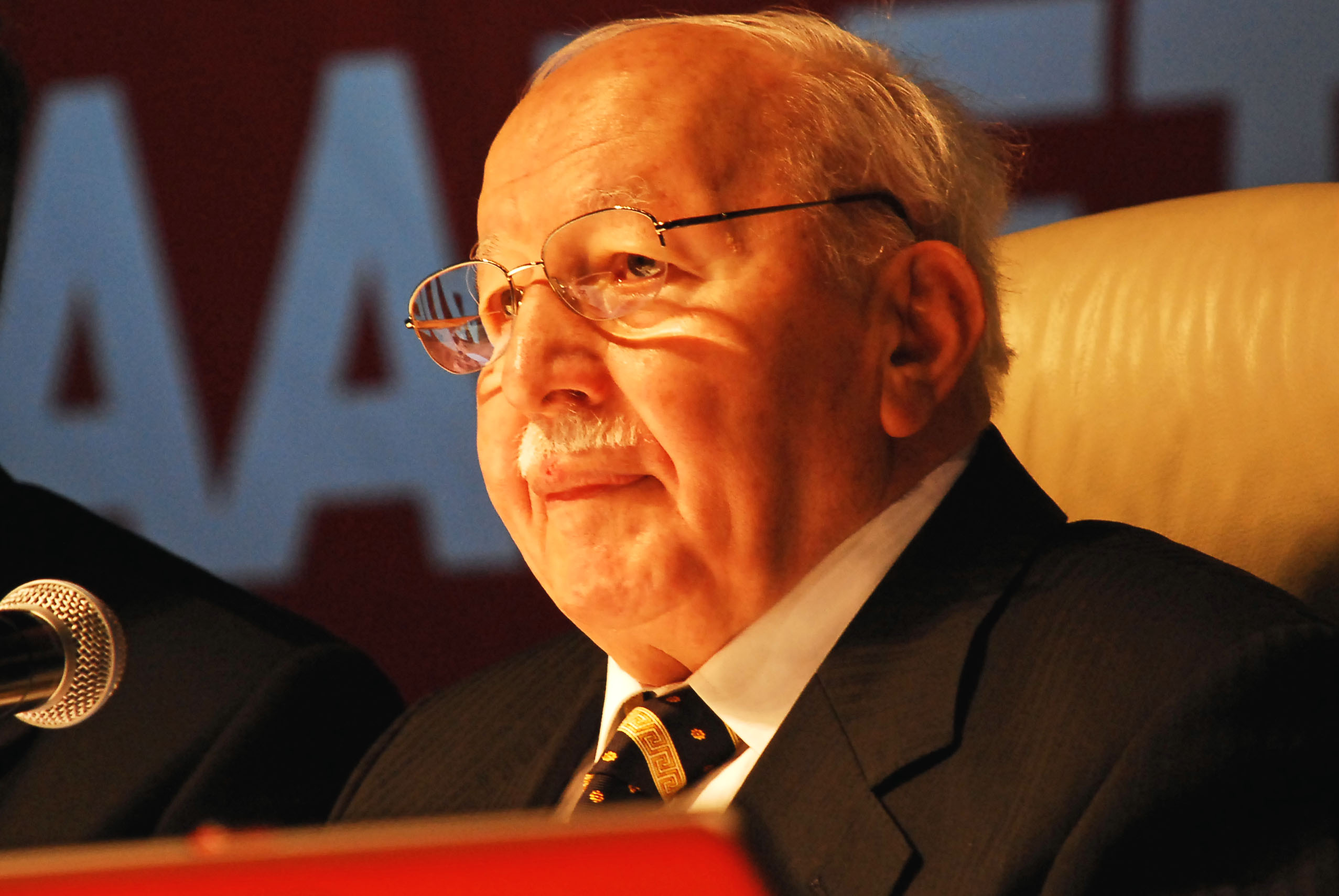
Necmettin Erbakan

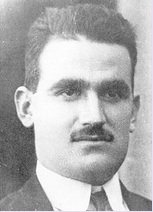
Ziya Hurşit

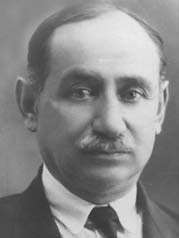
Rüştü Pasha

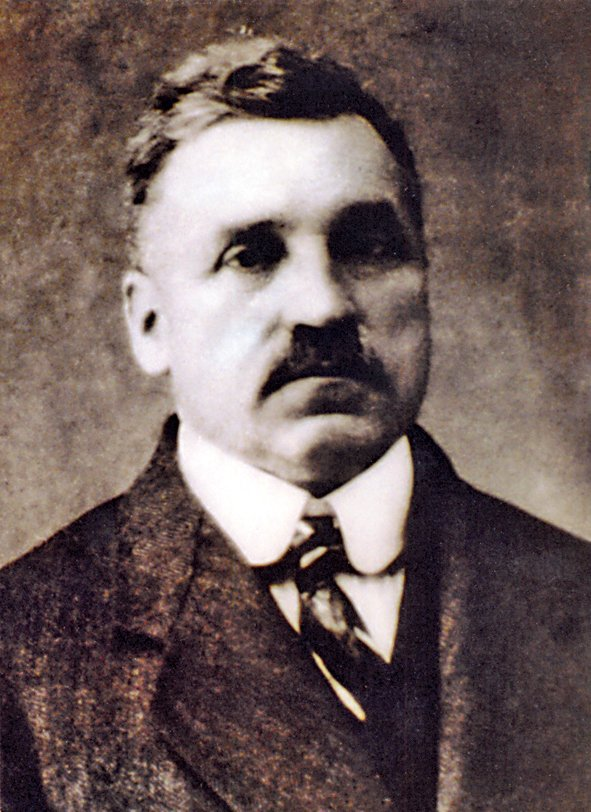
Nazım Bey
