= 1930 in Turkey =

- Decades: 1920s; 1930s; 1940s; 1950s
- See also: List of years in Turkey

Events in the year 1930 in Turkey.

== Parliament ==
- 3rd Parliament of Turkey

== Incumbents ==
- President – Kemal Atatürk
- Prime Minister – İsmet İnönü
- Leader of the opposition – Fethi Okyar (12 August −17 November)

== Ruling party and the main opposition ==
- Ruling party – Republican People's Party (CHP)
- Main opposition – Liberal Republican Party (SCF) (12 August-12 November)

== Cabinet ==
- 5th government of Turkey (up to 27 September)
- 6th government of Turkey (from 27 September)

== Events ==
- 3 April – Women's suffrage (in local elections) was legalized
- 7 May – The 7.1 M_{w} Salmas earthquake shakes northwestern Iran and southeastern Turkey with a maximum Mercalli intensity of X (Extreme). Up to three-thousand people were killed.
- 10 June – Agreement between Turkey and Greece concerning the population exchange problems in the 1920s.
- 12 August – Liberal Republican Party (SCF) was founded
- 26 September – People Republic Party, a second opposition party was founded
- 27 September – New government
- 17 November – SCF dissolved itself
- 23 December – Menemen Incident in which a group of reactionaries who opposed Atatürk's reforms killed Mustafa Fehmi Kubilay a young lieutenant.

== Births ==
- 26 February – Orhan Karaveli, journalist and writer
- 2 March – Neşe Aybey, miniaturist
- 23 April – Şarık Tara, civil engineer and contractor
- 22 May – Mete Avni Sözen, structural engineer
- 17 June – Adile Naşit, theatre player
- 1 September – Turgut Özakman, writer
- 23 September – Çelik Gülersoy, lawyer and historical preservationist
- 9 October – Rahmi Koç, industrialist
- 30 December – Dündar Ali Osman, 45th Head of the House of Osman (in Syria)

== Deaths ==
- 26 February – Ahmet Rıza (born in 1858), politician
- 30 March – Hodja Ali Rıza (born in 1858), painter
- 8 August – Alaaddin Koval (born in 1878), general
- 23 December – Mustafa Fehmi Kubilay (born in 1906), lieutenant (lynched)

== Gallery ==
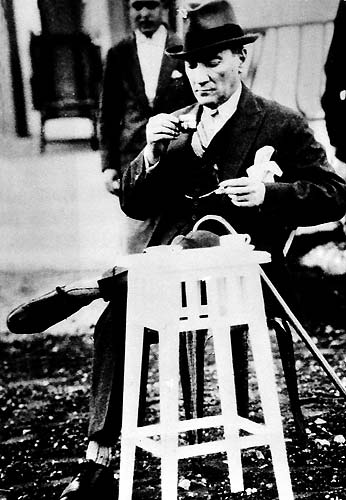
Kemal Atatürk

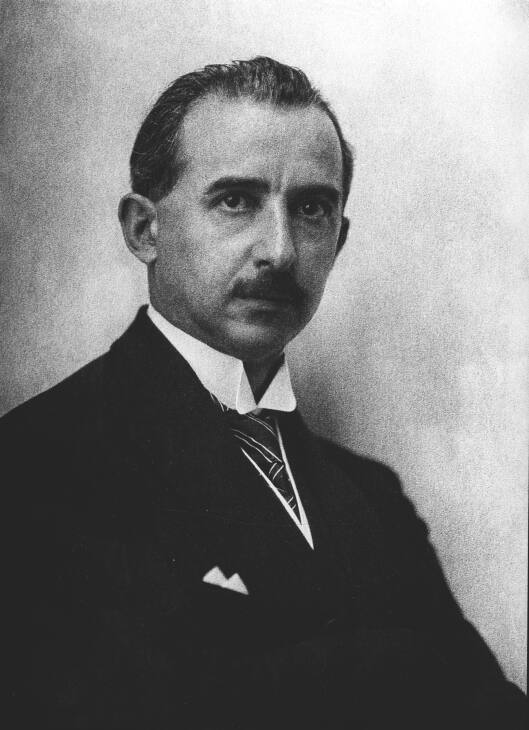
İsmet İnönü

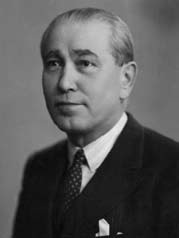
Fethi Okyar

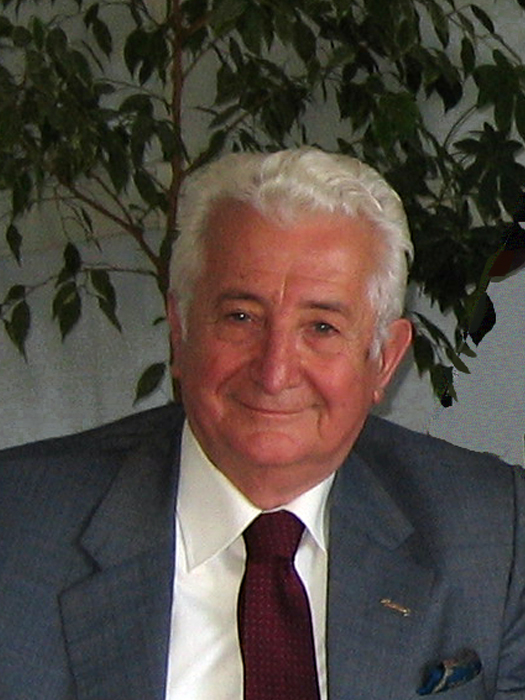
Orhan Karaveli

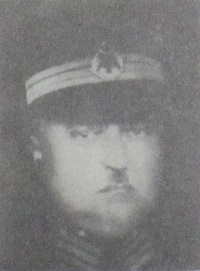
Alaaddin Koval

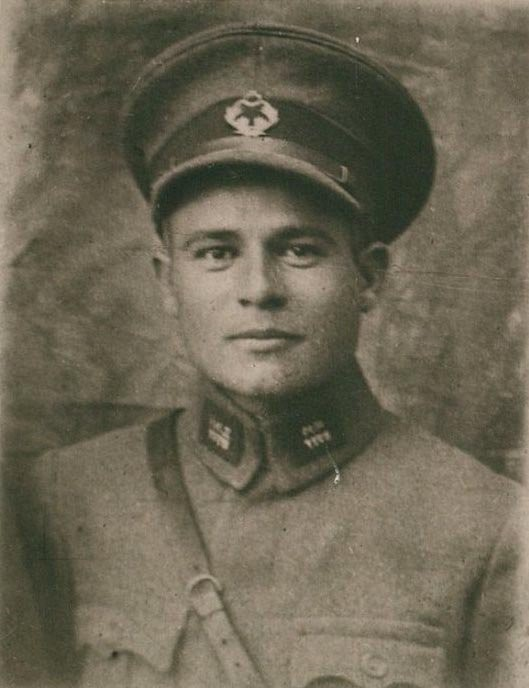
Mustafa Fehmi Kubilay
