= 1935 in Turkey =

- Centuries: 20th; 21st
- Decades: 1920s; 1930s; 1940s; 1950s
- See also: List of years in Turkey

Events in the year 1935 in Turkey.

== Parliament ==
- 4th Parliament of Turkey (up to 1 March)
- 5th Parliament of Turkey (from 1 March)

== Incumbents ==
- President – Kemal Atatürk
- Prime Minister – İsmet İnönü

== Ruling party and the main opposition ==
- Ruling party – Republican People's Party (CHP)

== Cabinet ==
- 7th government of Turkey (up to 1 March)
- 8th government of Turkey (from 1 March)

== Events ==
- 4 January – The 6.4 M_{w} Erdek–Marmara Islands earthquake affected the area with a maximum Mercalli intensity of VIII (Severe), leaving five people dead and thirty injured.
- 1 February – Hagia Sophia is converted into a museum.
- 1 March – New government
- 8 February – General elections. 17 female MPs
- 1 May – 1935 Digor earthquake
- 27 May: Sunday, rather than Friday, becomes the day of rest.
- 19 October – A group of assassins aiming to assassinate Atatürk were arrested.
- 20 October – Census (Population 16,158,018)

== Births ==
- 20 January – Güven Sazak, businessman (d. 2011)
- 2 February – Tuncay Mataracı, politician (d. 2020)
- 20 August – Gürdal Duyar, sculptor (d. 2004)
- 21 August – Adnan Şenses, singer
- 4 October – İlhan Cavcav, sports club director
- 13 December – Türkan Saylan, academic, MD, social activist (d. 2009)
- date unknown – Ümit Kaftancıoğlu, Turkish writer (d. 1980)

== Deaths ==
- 8 January – Rauf Yekta (born 1871), musician
- 3 March – Ali Rıfat Çağatay (born 1869), musician
- 11 March – Yusuf Akçura (born 1879), writer, historian
- 27 May – Ahmet Cevdet Oran (born 1862), journalist

== Gallery ==
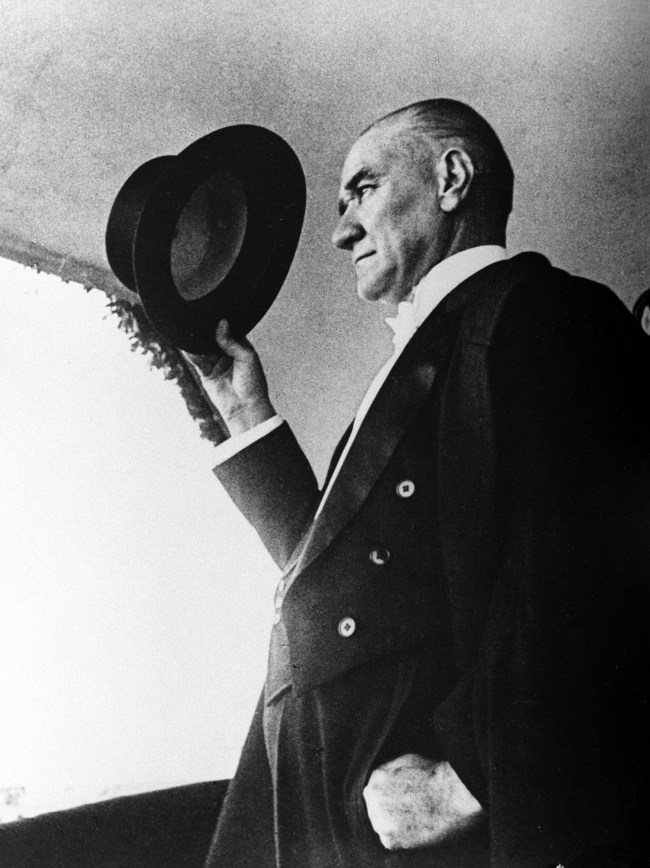
Kemal Atatürk

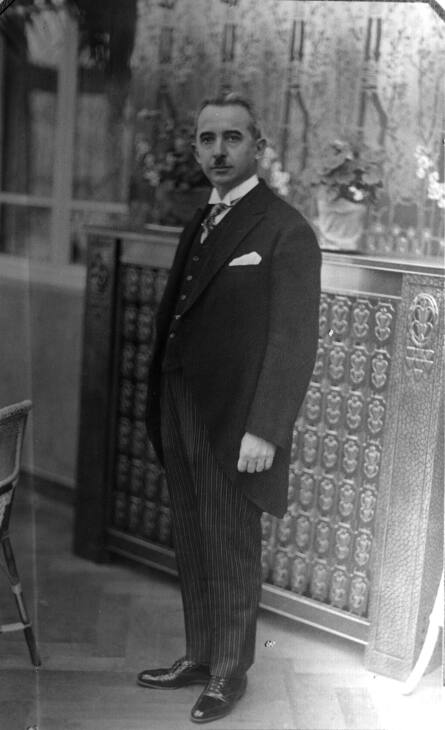
İsmet İnönü

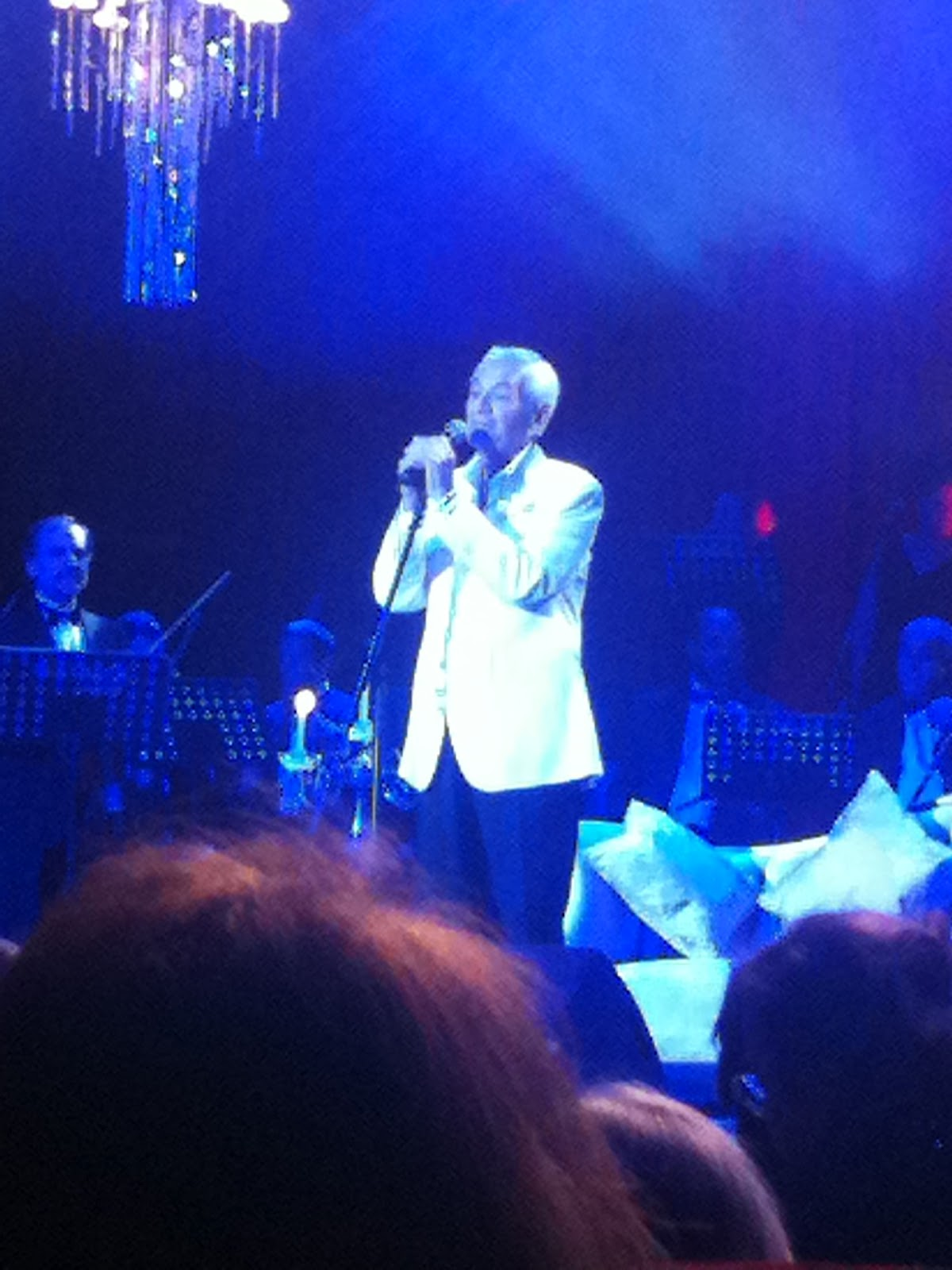
Adnan Şenses

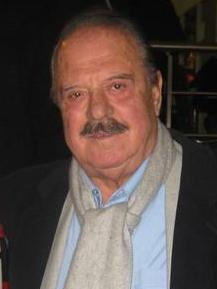
İlhan Cavcav

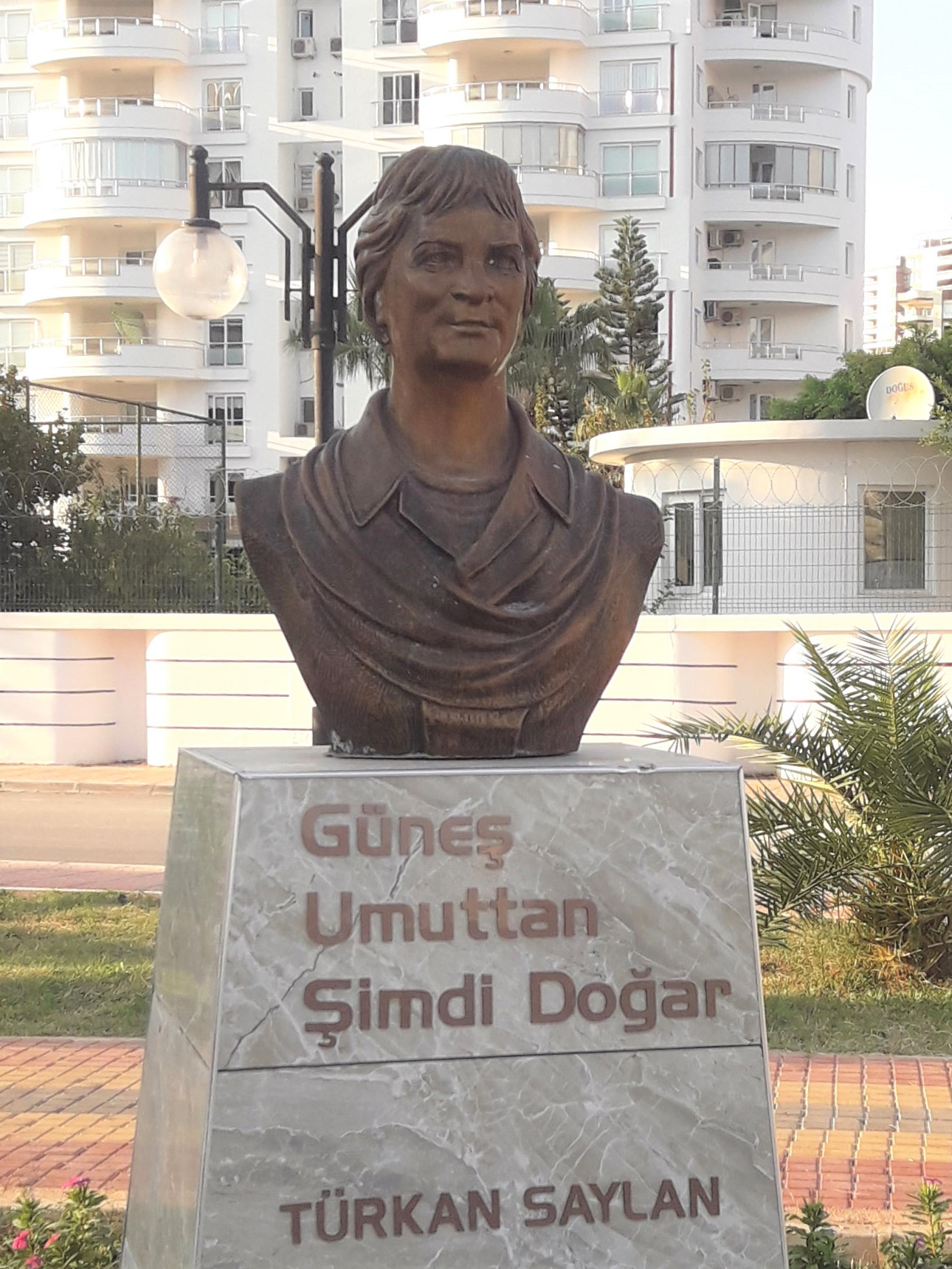
Türkan Saylan

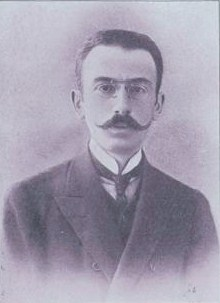
Rauf Yekta

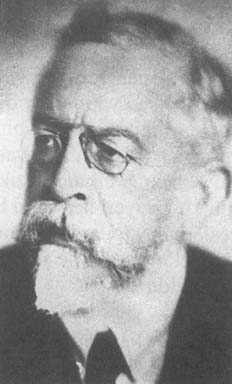
Yusuf Akçura
