= 1933 in Turkey =

- Centuries: 20th; 21st
- Decades: 1920s; 1930s; 1940s; 1950s
- See also: List of years in Turkey

Events in the year 1933 in Turkey.

== Parliament ==
- 4th Parliament of Turkey

== Incumbents ==
- President – Kemal Atatürk
- Prime Minister – İsmet İnönü

== Ruling party and the main opposition ==
- Ruling party – Republican People's Party (CHP)

== Cabinet ==
- 7th government of Turkey (up to 27 September)

== Events ==
- 8 January – First 5-year plan
- 22 April – Agreement with the creditors of Ottoman Public Debt Administration
- 1 August – Modern Istanbul University replaced Ottoman Darülfünun
- 29 October – During the 10th year ceremony of the Turkish Republic, Atatürk gave his Tenth Year Speech

== Births ==
- 22 January – Sezai Karakoç, poet
- 31 January, Süleyman Ateş, theologian
- 5 March – Hayati Hamzaoğlu, actor
- 1 April – Pars Tuğlacı, linguist, writer
- 7 April – Sakıp Sabancı, industrialist
- 16 April – Erol Günaydın, theatre actor
- 29 October – Muzaffer İzgü, writer

== Deaths ==
- 16 January – Bekir Sami Kunduh (born in 1867), diplomat, politician
- 4 June – Ahmet Haşim (born in 1884), poet

== Gallery ==
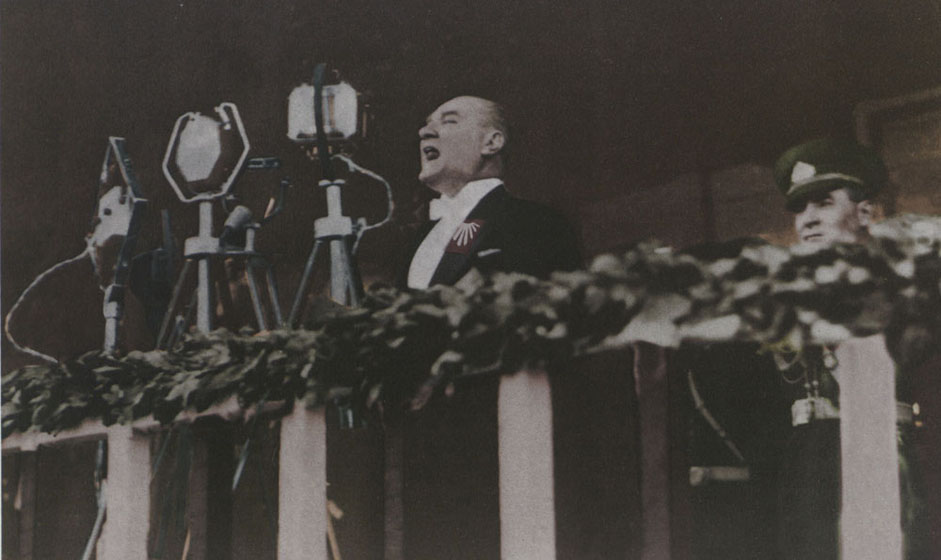
Kemal Atatürk during the 10th Anniversary Speech

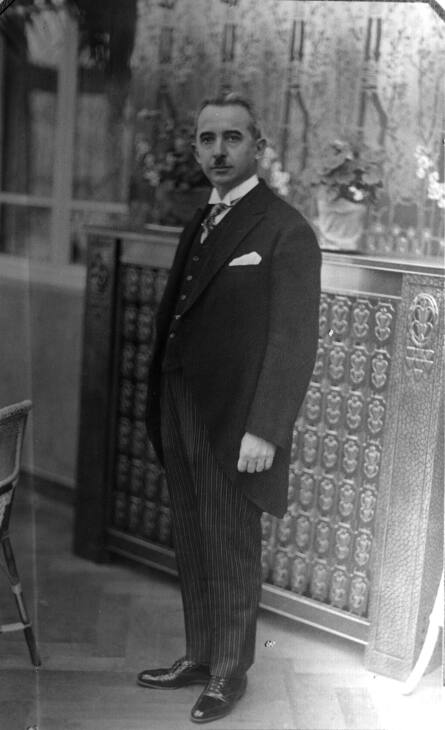
İsmet İnönü

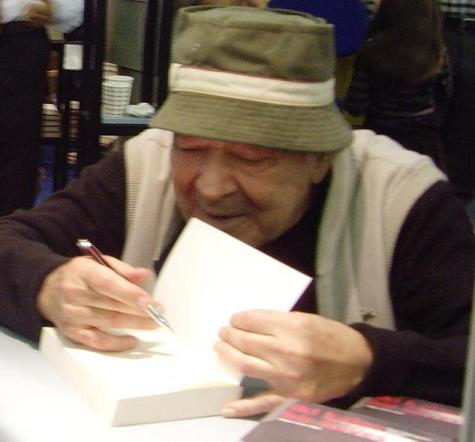
Erol Günaydın

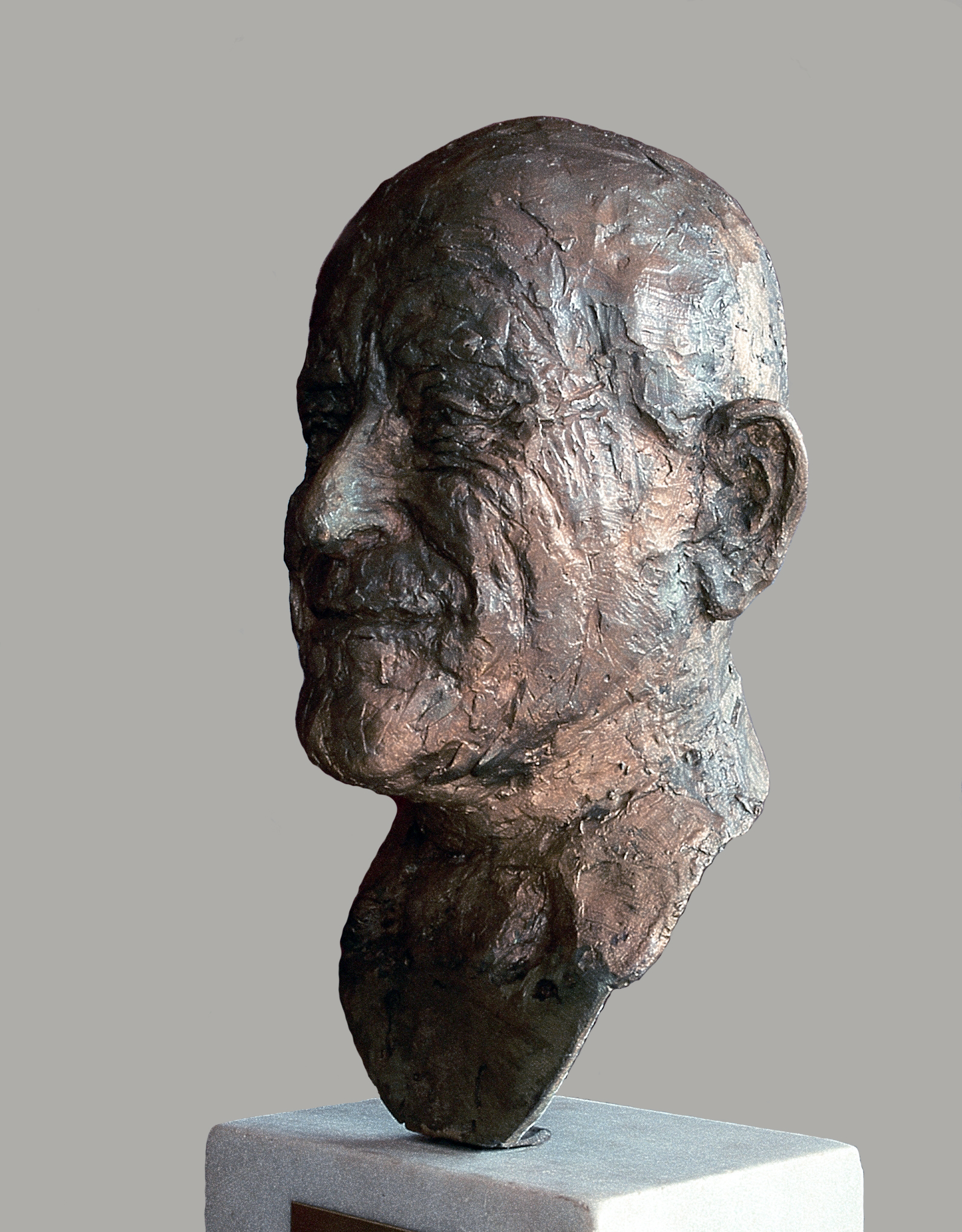
Sculpture of
Sakıp Sabancı

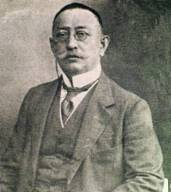
Bekir Sami Kunduh
