= 1932 in Turkey =

- Centuries: 20th; 21st
- Decades: 1920s; 1930s; 1940s; 1950s
- See also: List of years in Turkey

Events in the year 1932 in Turkey.

== Parliament ==
- 4th Parliament of Turkey

== Incumbents ==
- President – Kemal Atatürk
- Prime Minister – İsmet İnönü

== Ruling party and the main opposition ==
- Ruling party – Republican People's Party (CHP)

== Cabinet ==
- 7th government of Turkey

== Events ==
- 15 January: Statue of Honor in Samsun which symbolizes the beginning of Turkish War of Independence.
- 22 January: First time ezan in Turkish instead of traditional Arabic.
- 19 February: Halkevleri, a project to educate citizens mostly in rural areas, open.
- 12 July: Turkish Language Association was founded.
- 1 August: Keriman Halis Ece won the title Miss Universe.
- 12 August: Turkey joins League of Nations.

== Births ==
- 22 January – Günseli Başar – Miss Europe (1952)
- 5 February – Yoel Marcus, Israeli journalist and political commentator (died 2022).
- 7 March – Ekrem Bora, actor
- 15 March – Arif Mardin, music producer
- 15 May – Turgay Şeren, footballer
- 9 September – Müşfik Kenter, theatre actor
- 17 September – Yalçın Granit, basketball player, basketball coach
- 20 September – Atilla Karaosmanoğlu, economist, politician
- 15 October – Muammer Sun, musician
- 29 October – Füruzan, novelist
- 27 November – Ülkü Adatepe, Atatürk's adopted daughter
- 7 December – Oktay Ekşi, journalist
- 31 December – Muhterem Nur, actress
- 31 December – Yekta Güngör Özden, judge, former president of the Constitutional Court of Turkey

== Deaths ==
- 7 January – Ahmet Derviş (born 1881), military officer
- 18 February – Nurettin Pasha (born 1873), general
- 21 September – Ahmet Rasim (born 1864), journalist, historian, MD
- 29 November – Abdullah Cevdet (born 1869), writer, MD

== Gallery ==
Kemal Atatürk

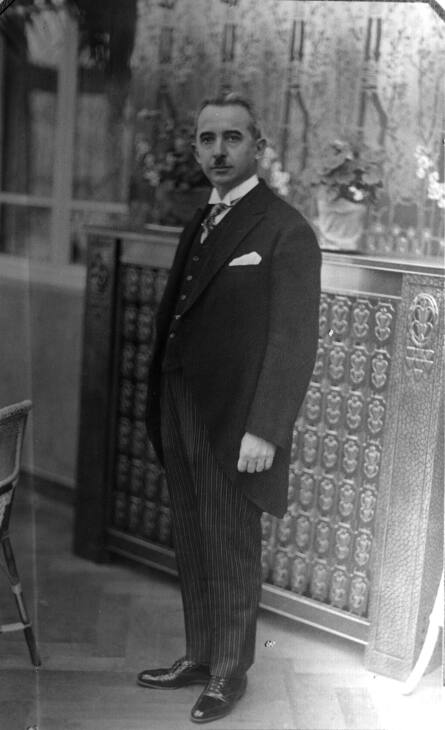
İsmet İnönü

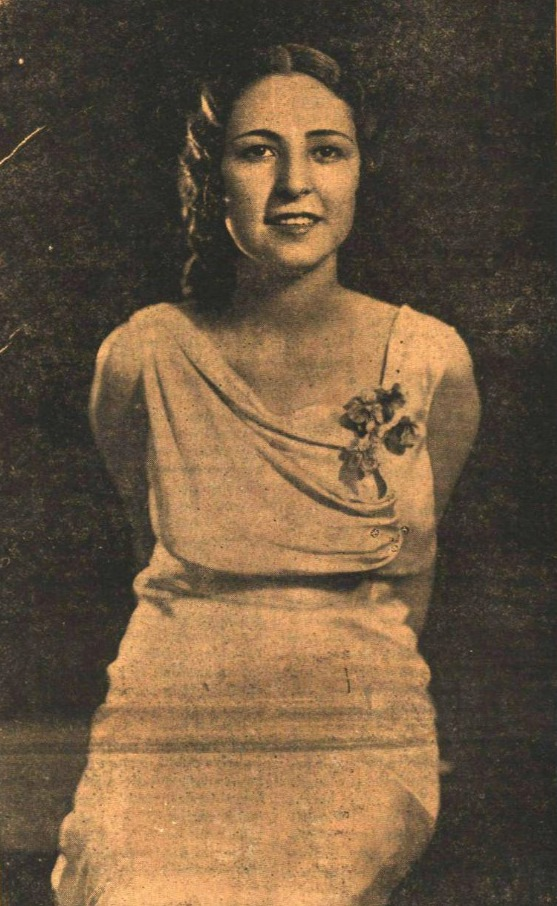
Keriman Halis Ece

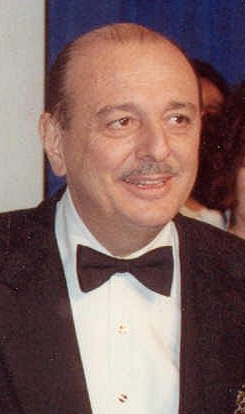
Arif Mardin

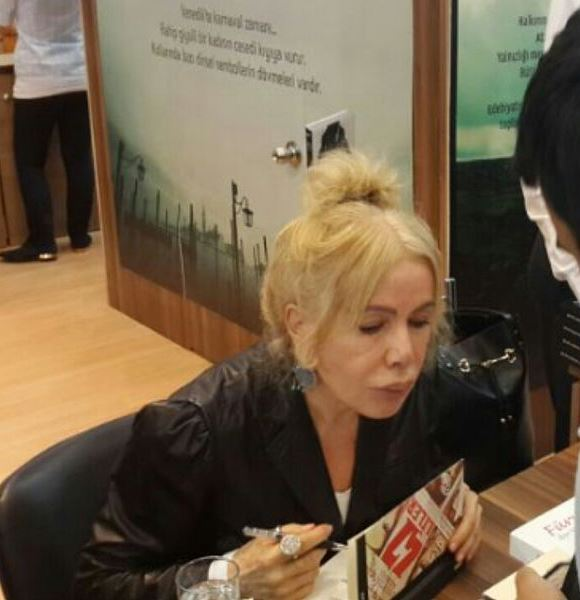
Firuzan

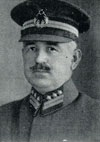
Ahmet Derviş
