= 1929 in Turkey =

- Centuries: 20th; 21st
- Decades: 1920s; 1930s; 1940s
- See also: List of years in Turkey

Events in the year 1929 in Turkey.

== Parliament ==
- 3rd Parliament of Turkey

== Incumbents ==
- President – Kemal Atatürk
- Prime Minister – İsmet İnönü

== Ruling party and the main opposition ==
- Ruling party – Republican People's Party (CHP)

== Cabinet ==
- 5th government of Turkey

== Events ==
- 21 January – Great fire in Istanbul
- 24 March – Bankruptcy law
- 16 April: Women are given the right to vote in municipal elections.
- 23 April – To commemorate the opening of the Turkish parliament was established as the Children's Day.
- 1 July – First intercity telephone line between Ankara and İstanbul
- 11 October – The maintenance of the Turkish battleship Yavuz was completed
- 25 October – First international air mail (Between İstanbul and Berlin)

== Births ==
- 7 February – Aysel Gürel, lyricist
- 13 February – Kenan Erim, archaeologist
- 18 February – Ertem Eğilmez, film director and producer
- 1 March – Nida Tüfekçi, musician
- 3 March – Mithat Bayrak, wrestler
- 29 April – Ferit Tüzün, composer
- 5 May – Ayhan Işık, actor
- 7 June – Basri Dirimlili, footballer
- 11 June – Ayhan Şahenk, business man
- 24 July – Gülriz Sururi, theatre actress
- 9 August – Abdi İpekçi, journalist
- 15 September – Mümtaz Soysal, academic, lawyer and politician
- 10 October – Ayten Alpman, singer
- 13 October – Adalet Ağaoğlu, novelist
- 30 November – Doğan Babacan, referee

== Deaths ==
- 1 January – Mustafa Necati (born in 1894), minister of education and the founder of Public schools for the new alphabet (Nation's schools)
- 15 September – Fehime Sultan (born 1875), Ottoman princess

== Gallery ==
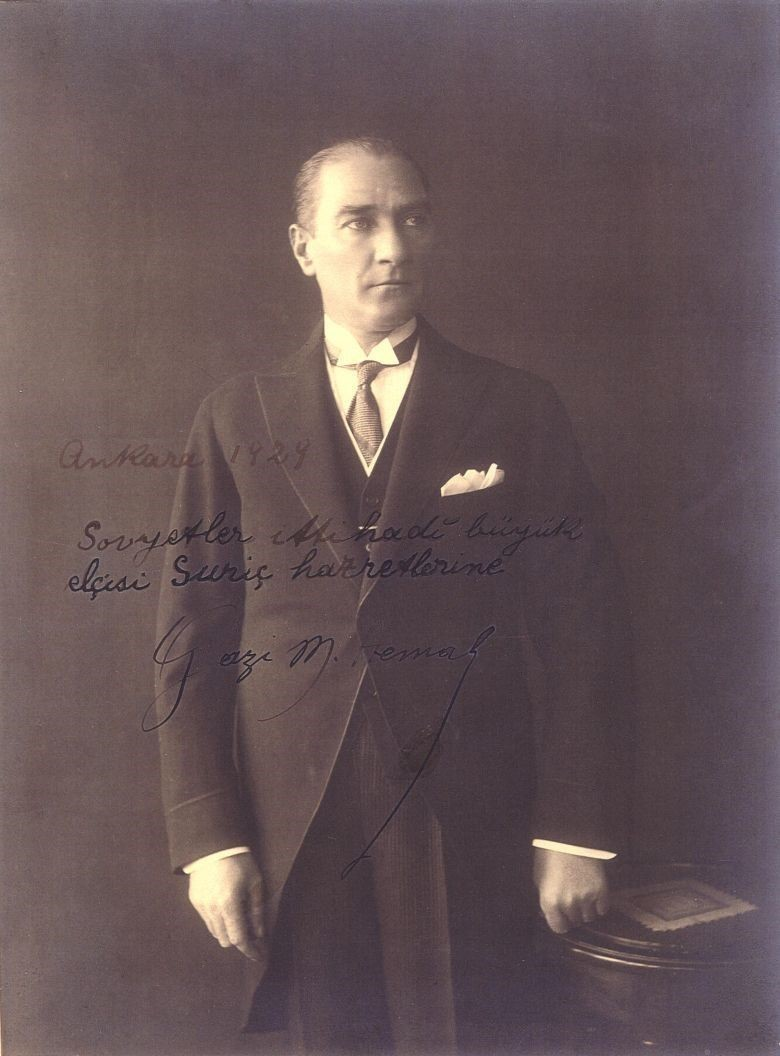
Kemal Atatürk

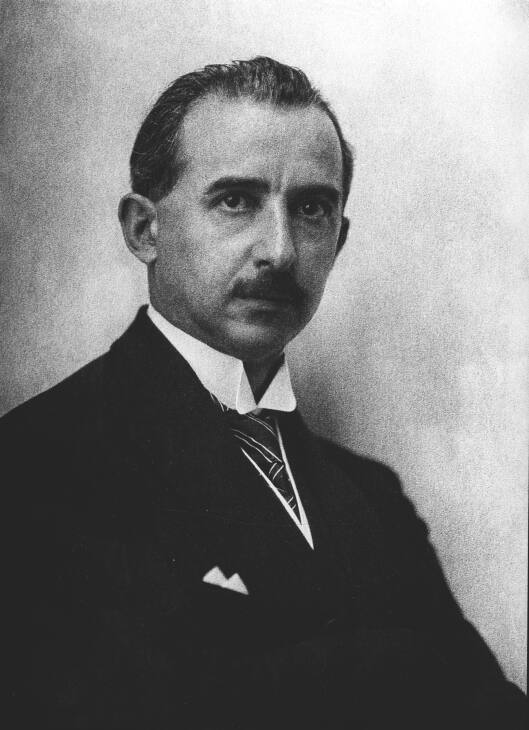
İsmet İnönü

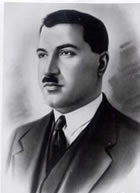
Mustafa Necati

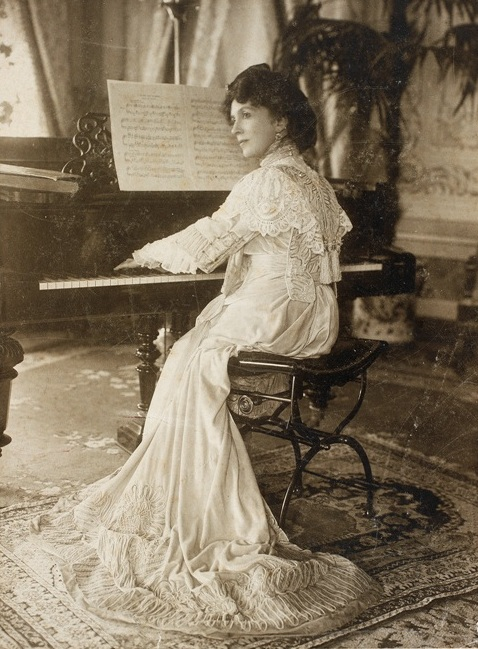
Fehime Sultan
