= 1928 in Turkey =

- Centuries: 20th; 21st
- Decades: 1920s; 1930s; 1940s
- See also: List of years in Turkey

Events in the year 1928 in Turkey.

== Parliament ==
- 3rd Parliament of Turkey

== Incumbents ==
- President – Kemal Atatürk
- Prime Minister – İsmet İnönü

== Ruling party and the main opposition ==
- Ruling party – Republican People's Party (CHP)

== Cabinet ==
- 5th government of Turkey

== Events ==
- 3 February – First hutbe in Turkish
- 10 April – State declared secular. ( see Secularism in Turkey)
- 31 March – Earthquake around Torbalı (west Anatolia)
- 23 May – Turkish citizenship law
- 28 June – Nation schools (Turkish: Millet mektebi) a project to increase the literacy rate
- 26 June – An academic committee to research on the adoptation of Latin alphabet to Turkish language
- 9 August – Kemal Atatürk announced that Turkish alphabet (a version of Latin alphabet, devoid of q, w and x and with the addition of ç, ş, ğ, ı, ö and ü) will replace the traditional Arabic alphabet in Turkish language. This is considered as a major step in the modernization of Turkey)
- 3 November: Latin alphabet adopted.
- 1 December: Latin alphabet law takes effect.
- 10 December – Surname law (up to 1928 people had no surnames and instead of surnames their place of birth was in use)

== Births ==
- 6 January – İsmet Sezgin, politician (d. 2016)
- 28 February – Kuzgun Acar, sculptor (d. 1976)
- 5 April – Haldun Dormen, theatre actor (d. 2026)
- 30 June – Orhan Boran, standup actor (d. 2012)
- 16 August – Ara Güler, photographer (d. 2018)
- 10 October – Leyla Gencer, operatic soprano (d. 2008)
- 11 October – Yıldız Kenter, theatre actress (d. 2019)

== Gallery ==
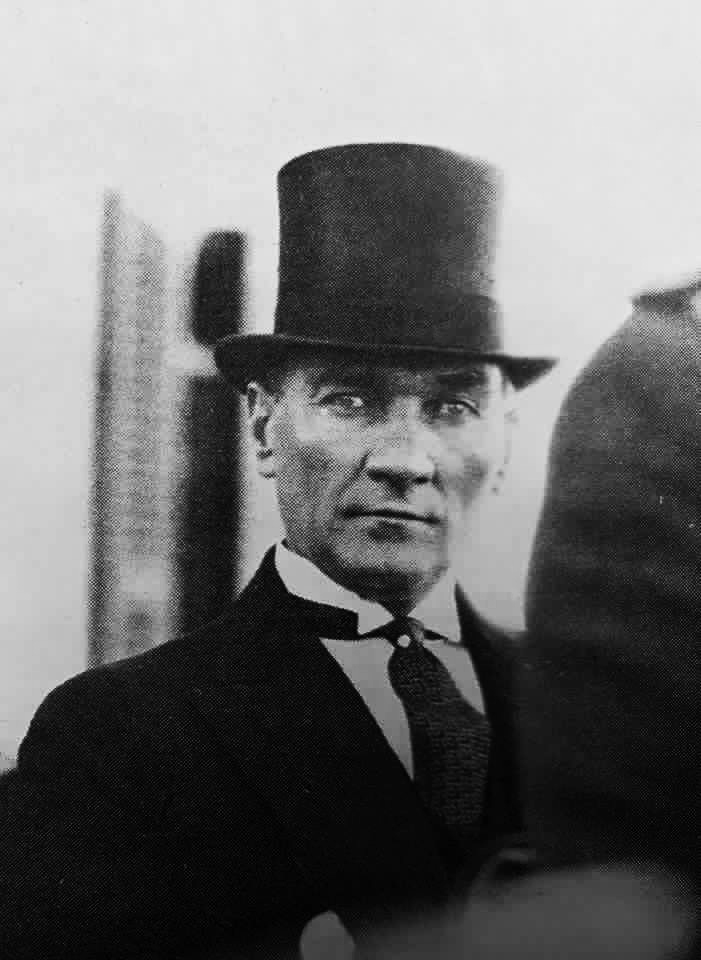
Kemal Atatürk

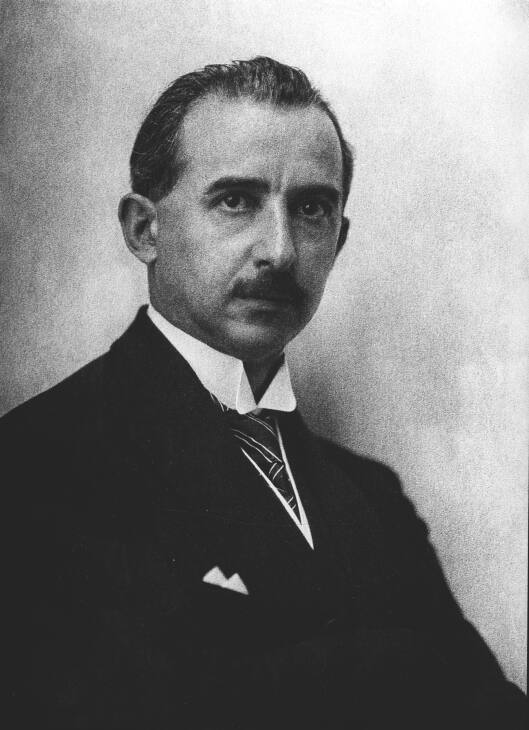
İsmet İnönü

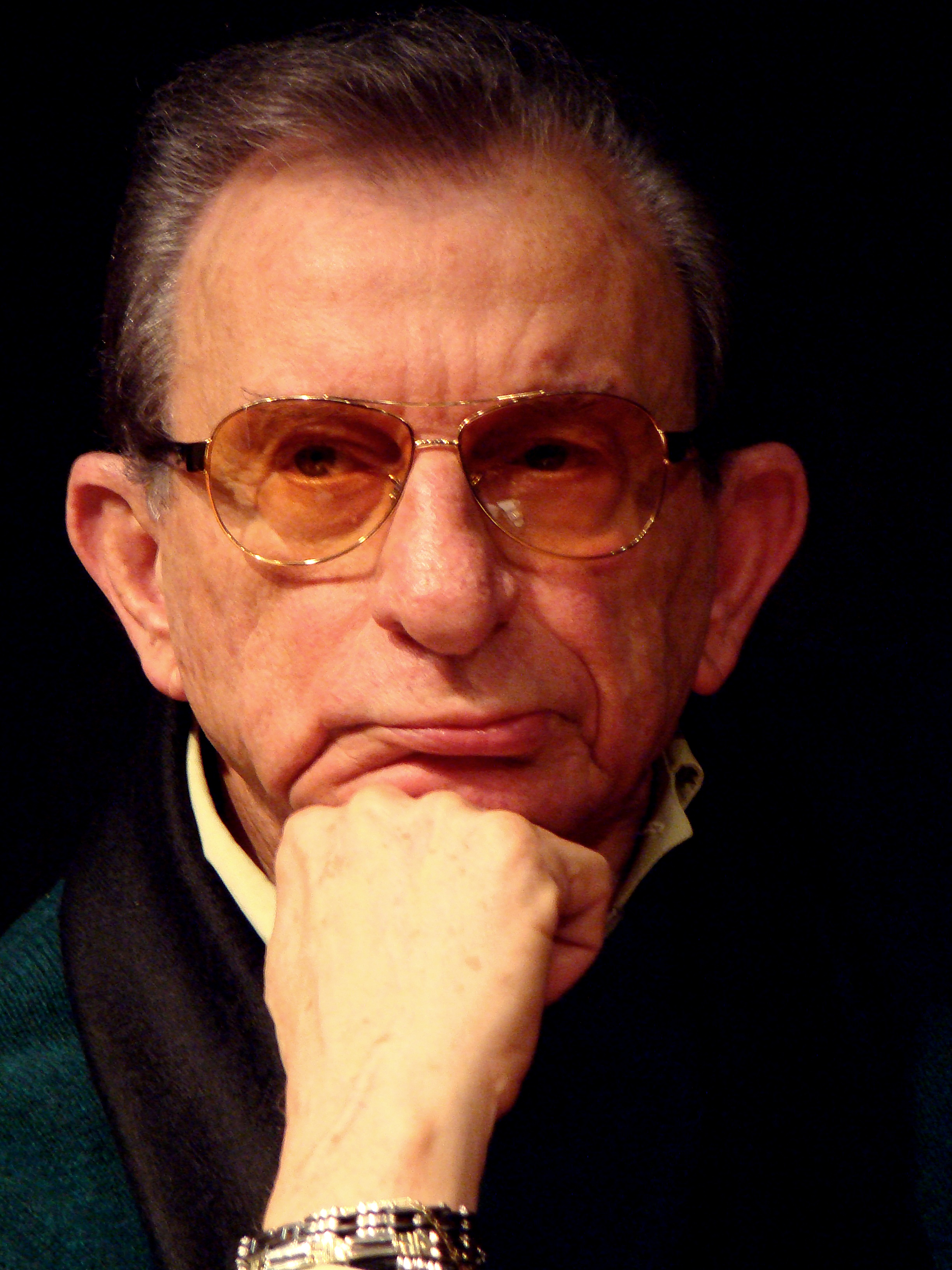
Haldun Dormen

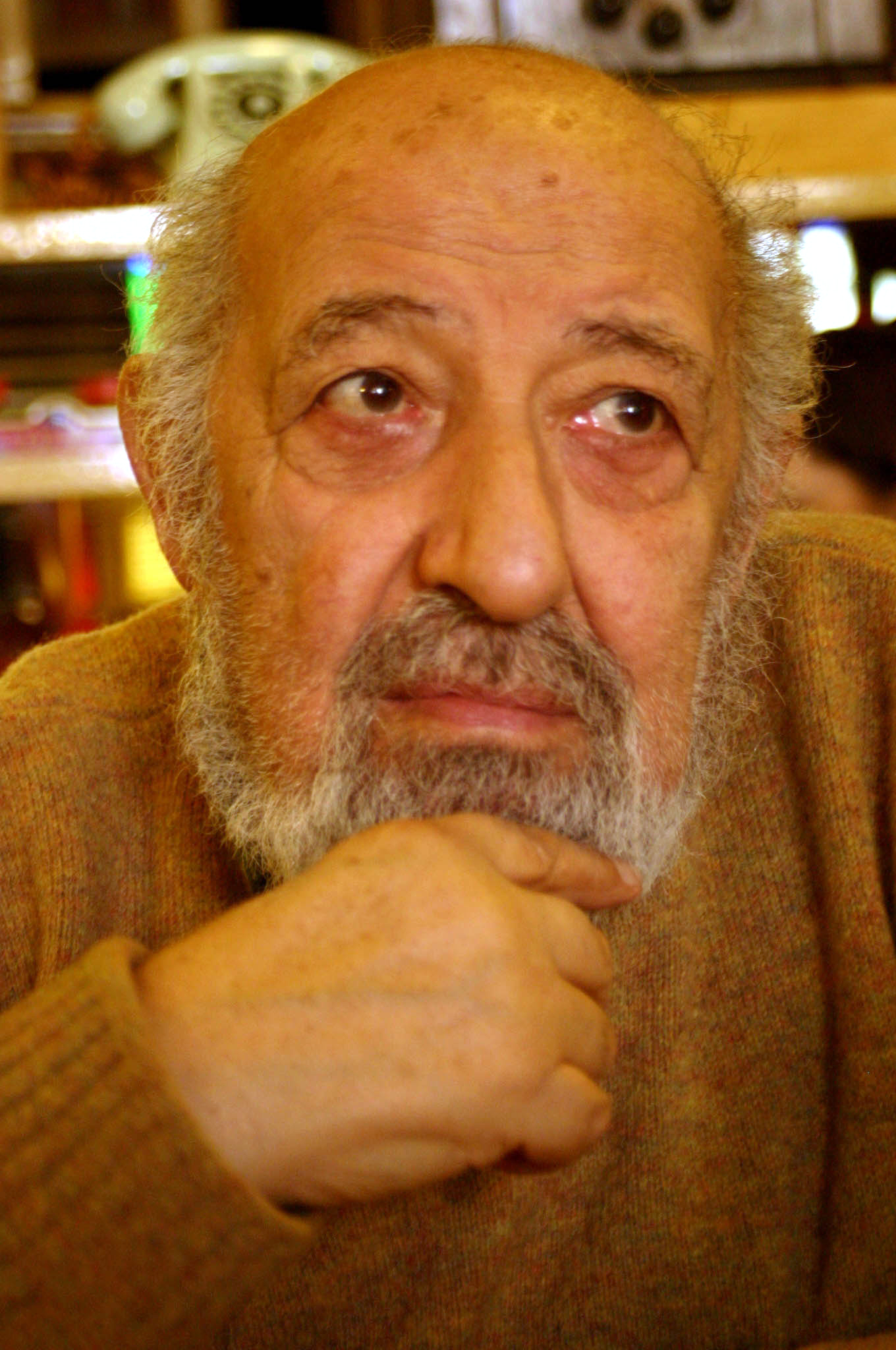
Ara Güler

== See also ==
- Turkey at the 1928 Summer Olympics
