= King Midas' Ears =

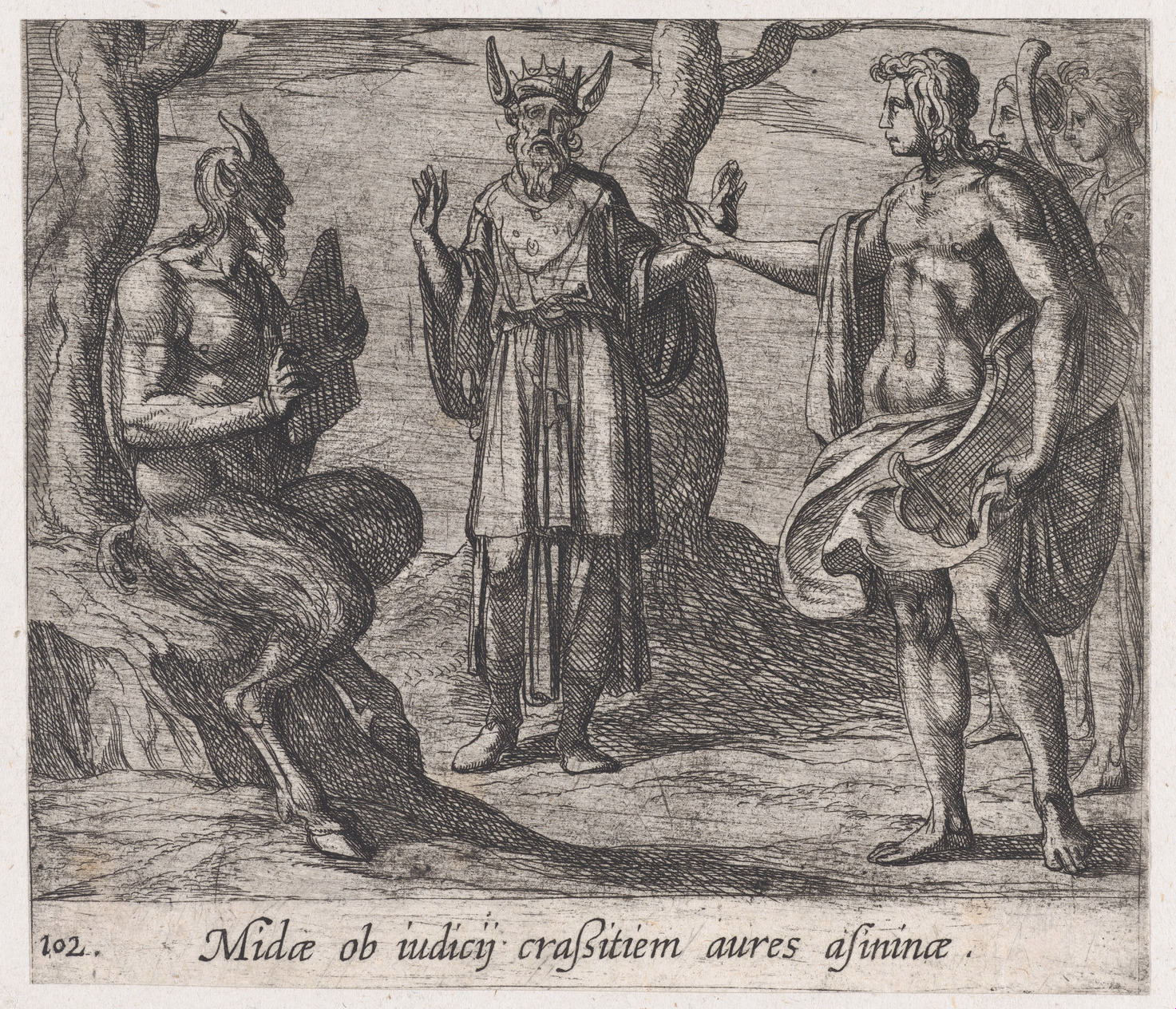
Midas with the Ears of an Ass, from Ovid's Metamorphoses

King Midas' Ears (Turkish: Midas'ın Kulakları) is an opera in two acts, a satirical work by Ferit Tüzün who composed it from 1966 to 1969. It is set to a libretto in Turkish by Güngör Dilmen. It premiered at State Opera in Istanbul in 1969.

The opera is based on part of the myth of Midas.

== Roles ==
- Midas, baritone
- Barber, speaking role
- Apollon, bass
- Pan, tenor
