= 1923 in Turkey =

- Centuries: 20th; 21st
- Decades: 1920s; 1930s; 1940s
- See also: List of years in Turkey

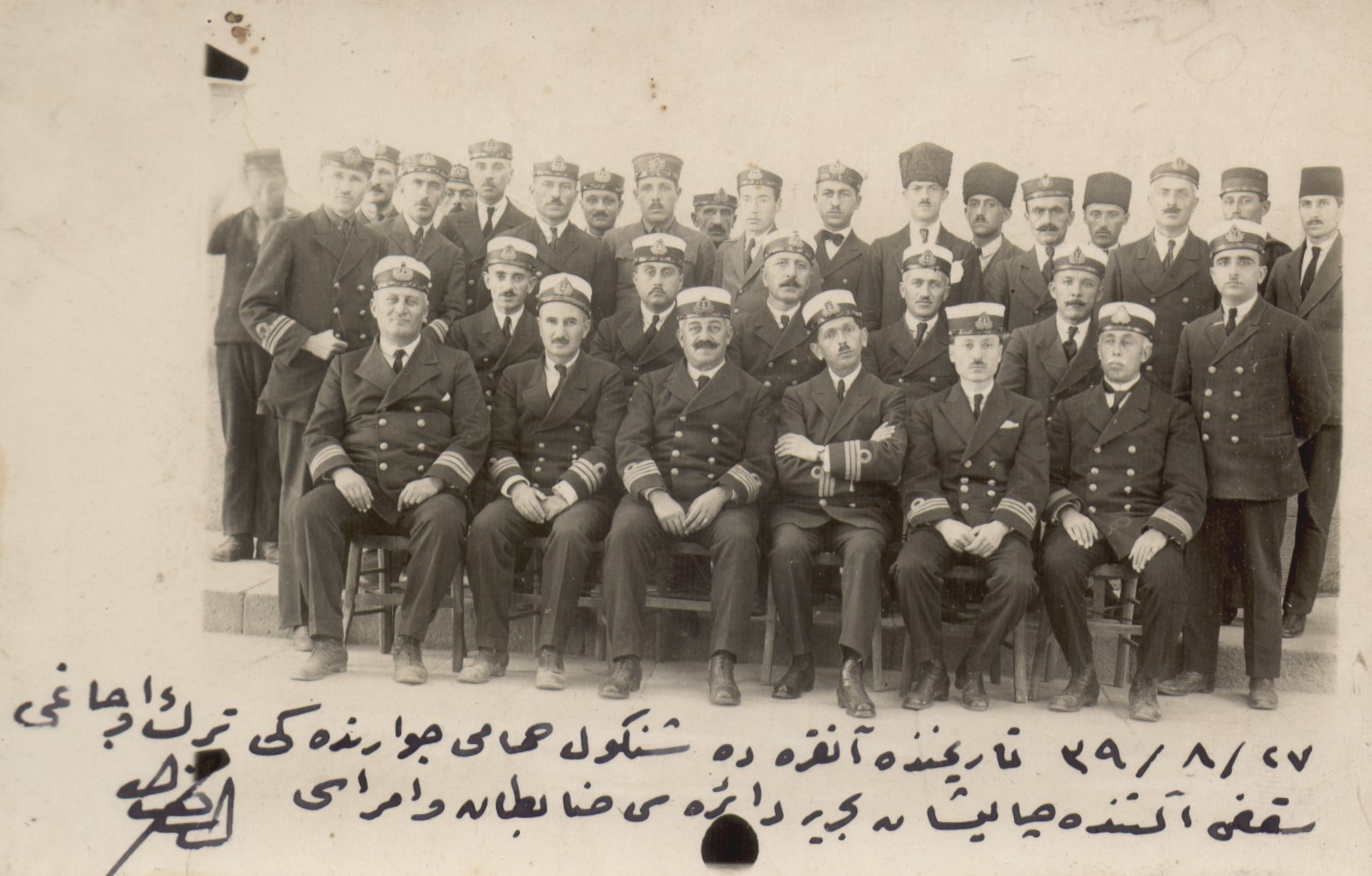
Turkish Naval Department Officers and Personnel, Ankara, August 27, 1923

Events in the year 1923 in Turkey.

== Parliament ==
- 2nd Parliament of Turkey

== Incumbents ==
- Mustafa Kemal Atatürk, President, 29 October 1923 – 10 November 1938
- İsmet İnönü, Prime Minister, 1 November 1923 – 22 November 1924

== Events ==
=== July ===
- The Turkish War of Independence was settled with the Treaty of Lausanne, signed on 24 July
- Turkish Republic was proclaimed on 29 October, abolishing the Ottoman sultanate
- Letter from Agha Khan III to İsmet İnönü about the future of the Caliphate was sent on 24 November

== Deaths ==
- 15 January – Zübeyde Hanım, 66, Mustafa Kemal Atatürk's mother.

== Births ==
- Refik Arslan, founder of Refik Restaurant (died 2011).
