= 1925 in Turkey =

- Decades: 1920s; 1930s; 1940s
- See also: List of years in Turkey

Events in the year 1925 in Turkey.

== Parliament ==
- 2nd Parliament of Turkey

== Incumbents ==
- President – Kemal Atatürk
- Prime Minister

Fethi Okyar (up to 3 March)
İsmet İnönü (from 3 March)

- Leader of the opposition – Kazım Karabekir (up to 5 June)

== Ruling party and the main opposition ==
- Ruling party – Republican People's Party (CHP)
- Main opposition – Progressive Republican Party (TCF) (up to 3 June)

== Cabinet ==
- 3rd government of Turkey (up to 3 March)
- 4th government of Turkey (from 3 March)

== Events ==
- 1 January –Turkey gained the right of duty tax (according to the treaty of Lausanne)
- 11 February – Beginning of Sheikh Said rebellion
- 17 February – Tax of Ashar ended. An important reform in the daily lives of the villagers
- 24 February – The rebels captured Elazığ
- 26 February – End of the Regie Company. An important step in the economics
- 3 March – Fetkhi Okyar’s cabinet which was ineffective against the rebellion was replaced by İsmet İnönü's new cabinet
- 4 March – Independence Tribunals
- 8 March – Rebels were defeated around Diyarbakır
- 12 April – Sheikh Said was arrested
- 1 May – Earthquake in Adana
- 3 June – Independence Tribunal closed the Progressive Republican Party
- 5 August – Atatürk and Latife Hanım (Latife Uşakizade) were divorced
- 25 August – In Kastamonu Atatürk made a speech on traditional costume and expressed his preference for western style hat
- 4 September – First ball in which Muslim women attended
- 25 November – The Hat reform
- 30 November – Tekkes, traditional institutions were closed

== Births ==
- 11 March – İlhan Selçuk, journalist
- 5 April – Sadri Alışık, actor
- 28 May – Bülent Ecevit, journalist, prime minister (37th, 40th, 42nd, 56th, and 57th government of Turkey)
- 1 June – İdris Küçükömer, academic and philosopher
- 15 June – Atilla İlhan, poet
- 6 July – Gazi Yaşargil, MD ( neurosurgeon)
- 15 August – Münir Özkul, theatre actor
- 28 September – Ali Bozer, lawyer, politician
- 9 December – Atıf Yılmaz, film director
- 22 December – Lefter Küçükandonyadis, footballer (of Greek origin)

== Deaths ==
- 14 February – Halit Pasha (born in 1883), general, politician (killed)
- 12 March – Hüseyin Ferit Törümküney (born in 1878), bureaucrat, politician
- 29 June – Şeyh Said (born in 1865), rebel leader (executed)
- 18 December – Süleyman Sırrı Aral (born in 1874), engineer, politician

== Gallery ==
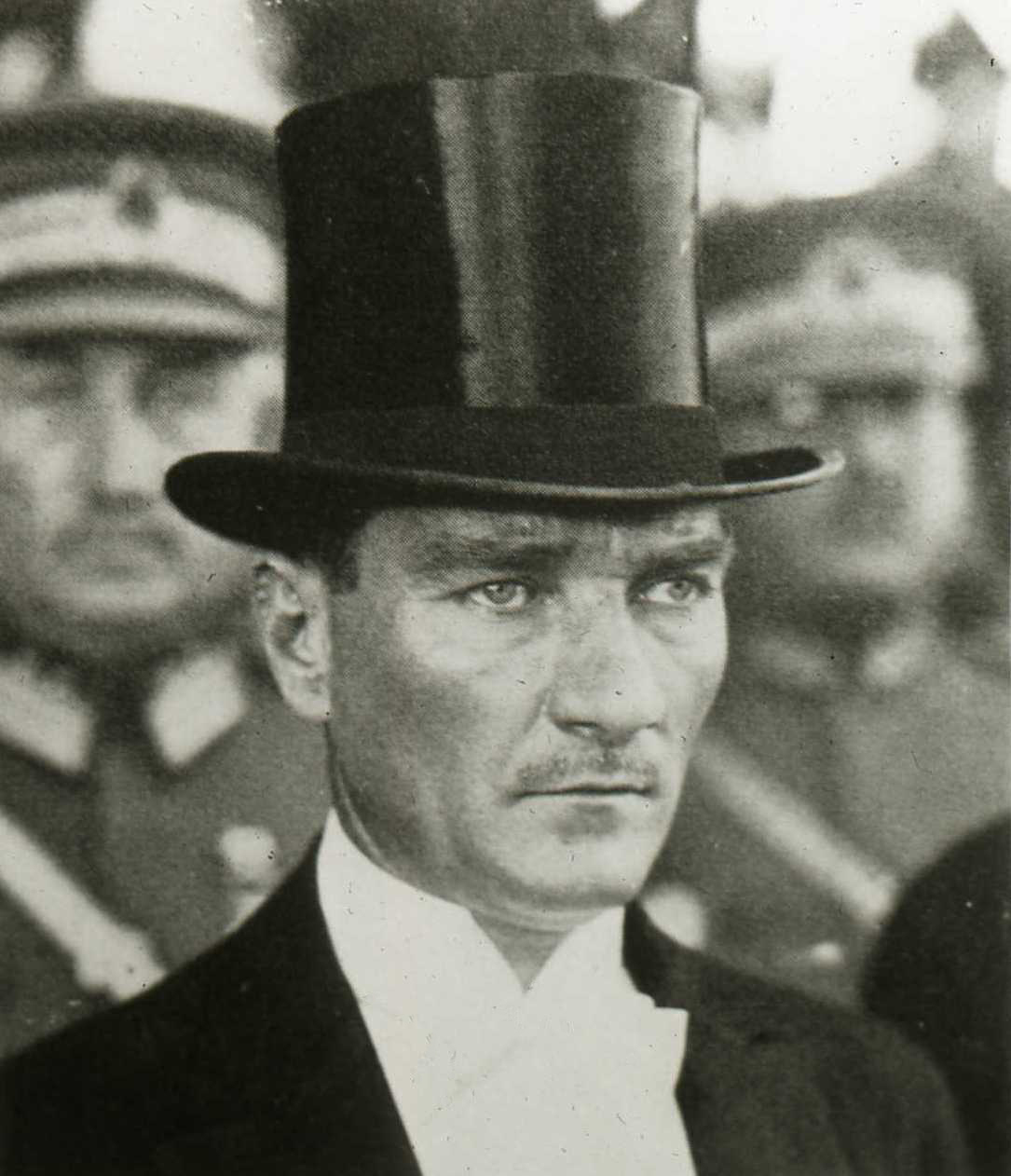
Kemal Atatürk

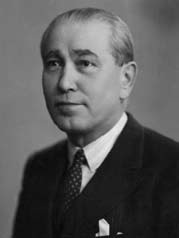
Fethi Okyar

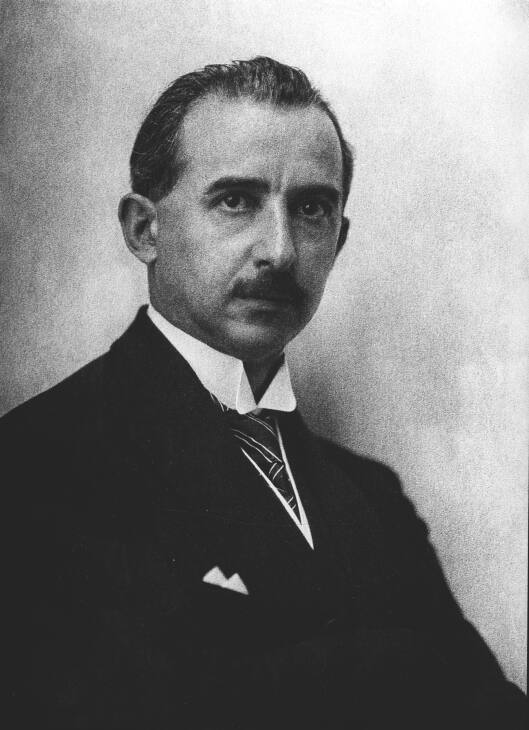
İsmet İnönü

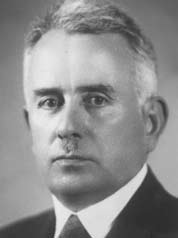
Kazım Karabekir

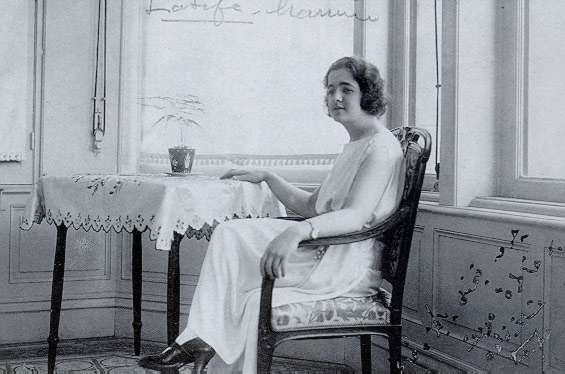
Latife Hanım

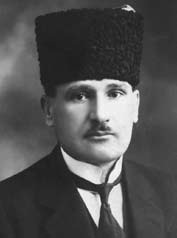
Halit Pasha

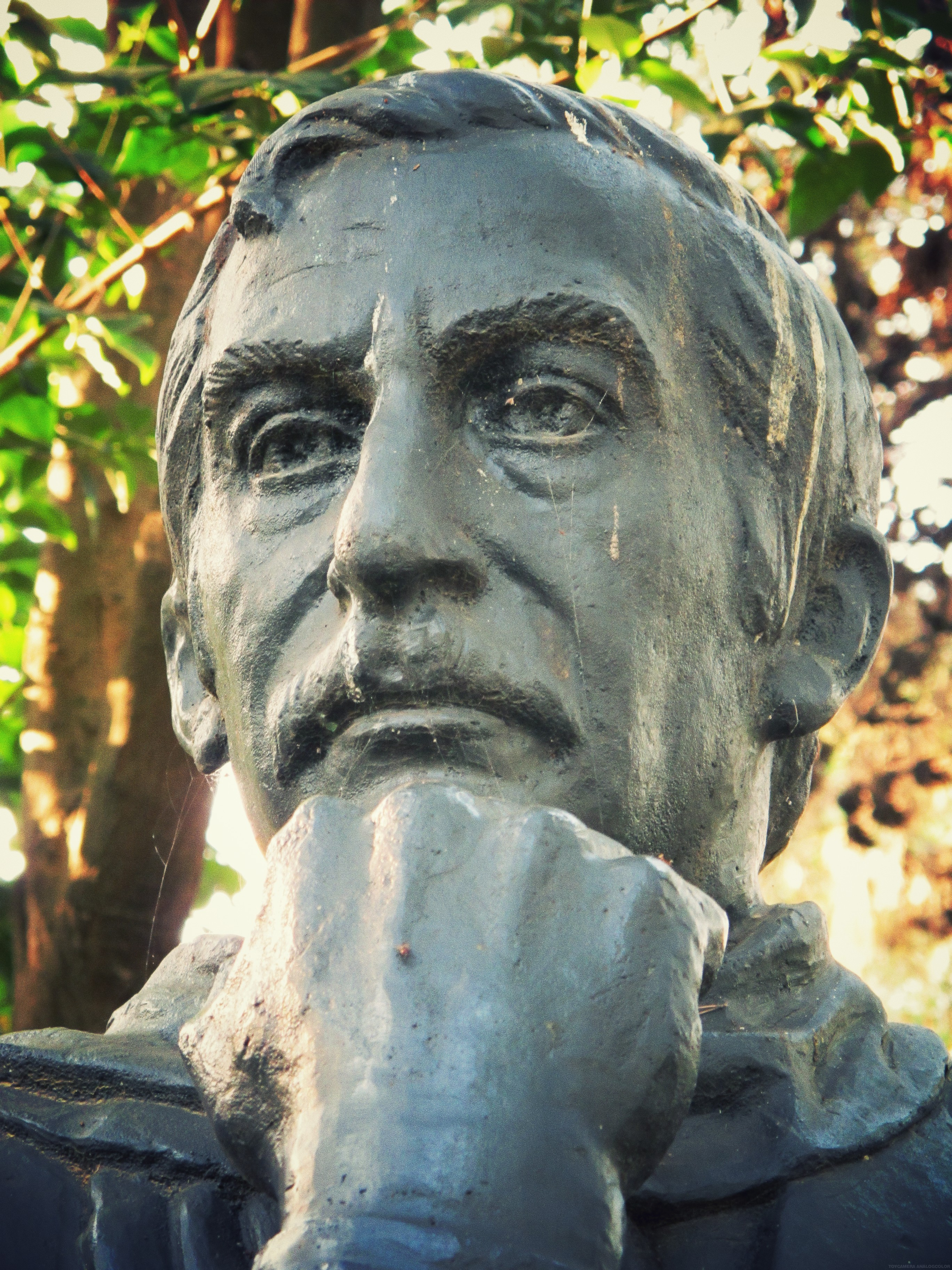
İlhan Selçuk (statue)

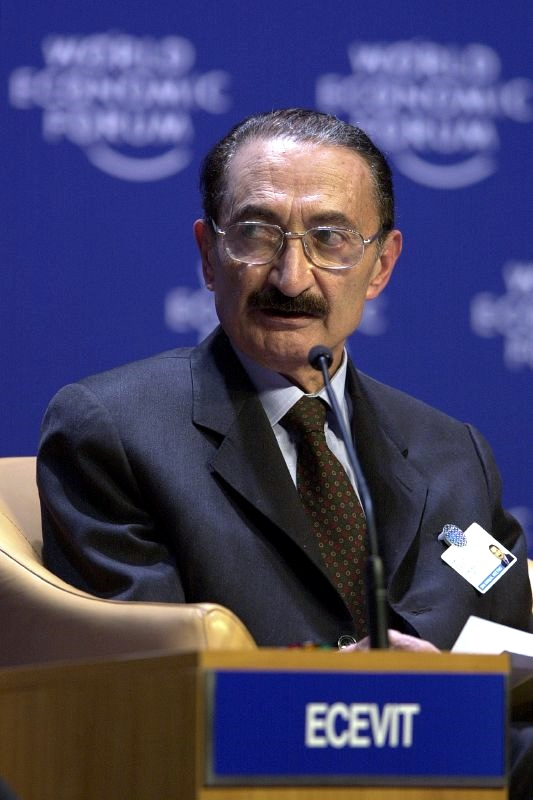
Bülent Ecevit

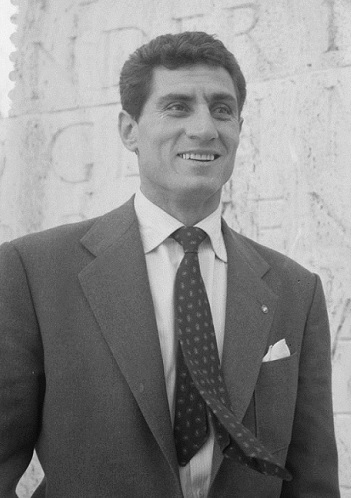
Lefter Küçükandonyadis
