= 1936 in Turkey =

- Centuries: 20th; 21st
- Decades: 1920s; 1930s; 1940s; 1950s
- See also: List of years in Turkey

Events in the year 1936 in Turkey.

== Parliament ==
- 5th Parliament of Turkey

== Incumbents ==
- President – Kemal Atatürk
- Prime Minister – İsmet İnönü

== Ruling party and the main opposition ==
- Ruling party – Republican People's Party (CHP)

== Cabinet ==
- 8th government of Turkey

== Events ==
- 6 May: First Conservatoire was founded
- 29 May: Turkish flag was legally defined
- 20 July: Montreux Convention signed.
- 8 September: Radio Broadcasting was nationalized

== Births ==
- 25 January – Onat Kutlar, writer (died 1995)
- 31 January – Can Bartu, footballer (died 2019)
- 1 February – Tuncel Kurtiz, actor (died 2013)
- 2 February – Metin Oktay, footballer (died 1991)
- 15 March – Göksel Arsoy, actor
- 22 March – Erol Büyükburç, singer (died 2015)
- 15 April – Aydın Doğan, business man, newspaper owner
- 18 May – Türker İnanoğlu, film producer
- 28 June – Belgin Doruk, actress (died 1995)
- 8 August – Çolpan İlhan, actress (died 2014)
- 24 September, İnal Batu, diplomat, politician (died 2013)
- 27 September – Şeref Has, footballer (died 2019)
- 21 October – Suna Kan, violinist (died 2023)
- 8 November – Yılmaz Büyükerşen, academic, mayor of Eskişehir

== Death ==
- 13 July – Fatma Aliye Topuz (born in 1862), one of the earliest female novelists
- 26 October – Şükrü Naili Gökberk (born in 1876), retired general
- 27 December – Mehmet Akif Ersoy (born in 1873), poet of the national anthem

== Gallery ==
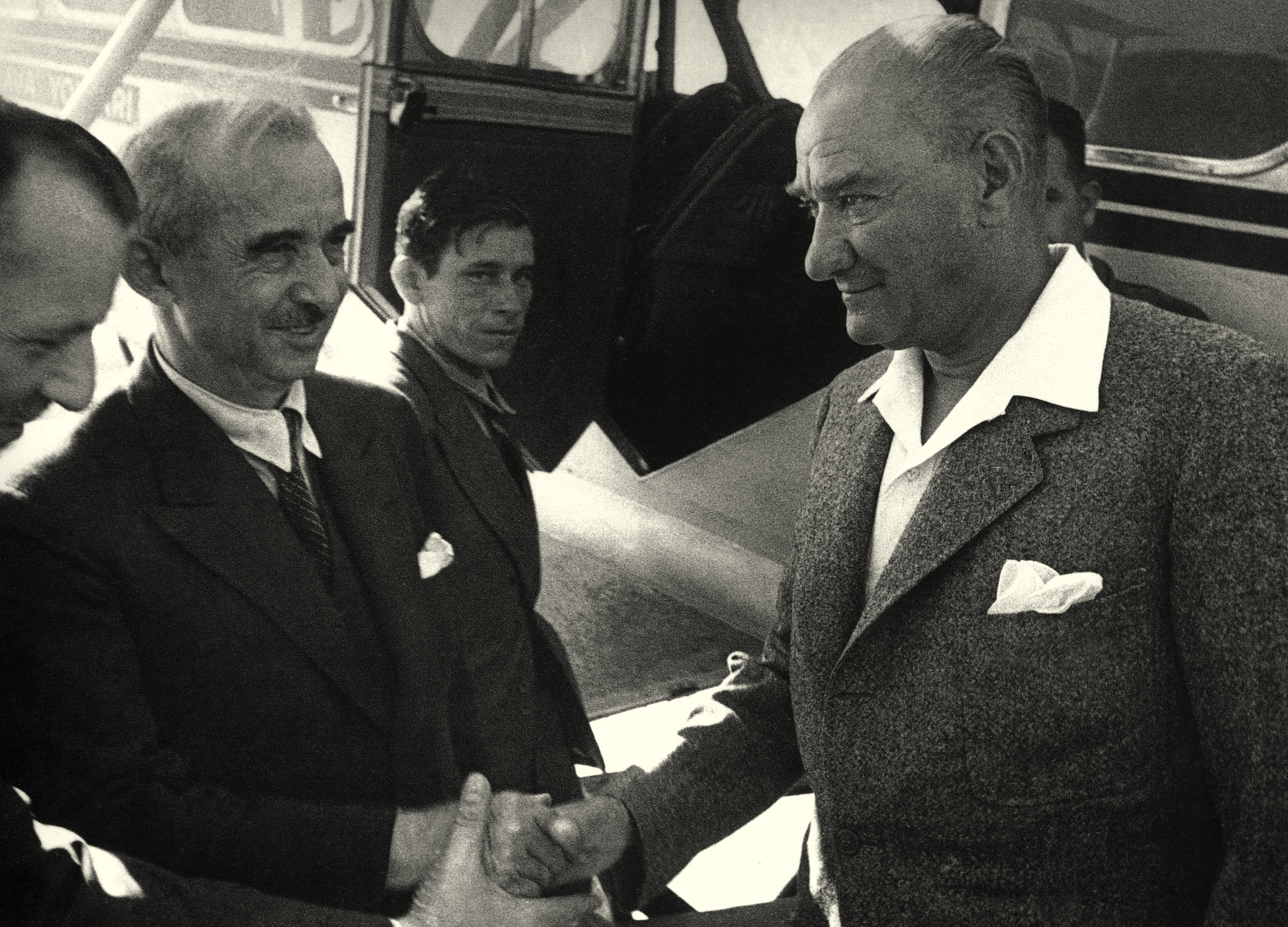
İsmet İnönü and Kemal Atatürk

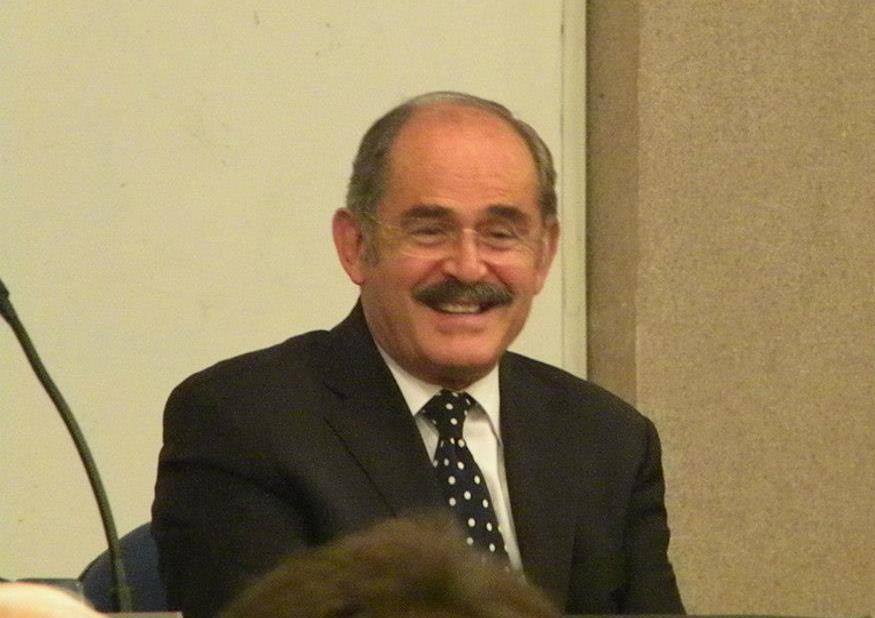
Yılmaz Büyükerşen

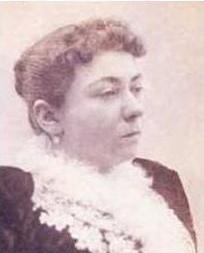
Fatma Aliye Topuz

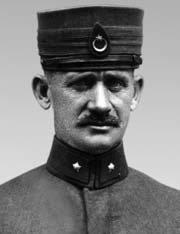
Şükrü Naili Gökberk

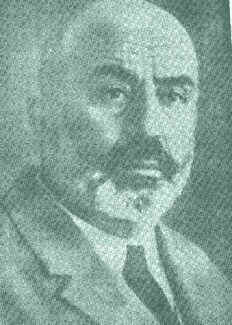
Mehmet Akif Ersoy

== See also ==
- Turkey at the 1936 Summer Olympics
- Turkey at the 1936 Winter Olympics
