= 1924 in Turkey =

- Decades: 1920s; 1930s; 1940s
- See also: List of years in Turkey

Events in the year 1924 in Turkey.

== Parliament ==
- 2nd Parliament of Turkey

== Incumbents ==
- President – Kemal Atatürk
- Prime Minister

İsmet İnönü (up to 21 November)
Fethi Okyar (from 21 November)

- Leader of the opposition – Kâzım Karabekir (from 8 December)

== Ruling party and the main opposition ==
- Ruling party – Republican People's Party (CHP)
- Main opposition – Progressive Republican Party (TCF) (from 9 November)

== Cabinet ==
- 1st government of Turkey (up to 6 March)
- 2nd government of Turkey (6 March – 21 November)
- 3rd government of Turkey (from 21 November)

== Events ==
- 31 January – Treaty of Lausanne was approved by the Italian parliament
- 29 February – Last public appearance of the caliph Abdülmecit II
- 3 March –
  - The Ottoman Caliphate was abolished
  - The Ministry of Sharia and the Foundations was abolished; the Directorate of Religious Affairs and the Directorate General of Foundations were established
  - Unification and secularization of the education system
  - Depolitization of the army
- 6 March – İsmet İnönü formed a new cabinet, because the ministries of General staff and the religion (şerriye) had been abolished on 3 March
- 8 March – Religious courts abolished
- 15 April – Treaty of Lausanne signed by the British King
- 17 April – Treaty of Lausanne approved by the Japanese parliament
- 24 April – New constitution
- 25 August – Turkey–League of Nations agreement on the Mosul issue
- 26 August – İşbank was founded
- 13 September – Pasinler earthquake
- 26 October – An internal political crisis named “Crisis of the commanders” because some high-ranking military personnel refused to give up their seats in the parliament (see 3 March)
- 9 November – Progressive Republican Party (TCF) was founded
- 21 November – After İsmet İnönü’s resignation Fethi Okyar formed the new cabinet
- 8 December – Kâzım Karabekir was elected as the president of TCF

== Births ==
- 27 January – Rauf Denktaş, Leaders of Cypriot Turks
- 22 March – Osman F. Seden, film director
- 27 March – Bülent Oran, actor
- 28 September – Lale Oraloğlu, theatre actress
- 29 September – Şükrü Elekdağ, diplomat, politician
- 1 November – Süleyman Demirel, prime minister (30th, 31st, 32nd, 39th, 41st, 43rd and 49th government of Turkey)
- 15 December – Ruhi Sarıalp, triple jump athlete
- 22 December – Sevim Tekeli, academic and historian

== Deaths ==
- 31 May – Fikriye (born in 1887), Atatürk’s relative and girlfriend
- 25 October – Ziya Gökalp (born in 1876), sociologist, writer
- 5 November – Fatma Pesend Hanım (born in 1876), a wife of Ottoman sultan Abdülhamit II

== Gallery ==
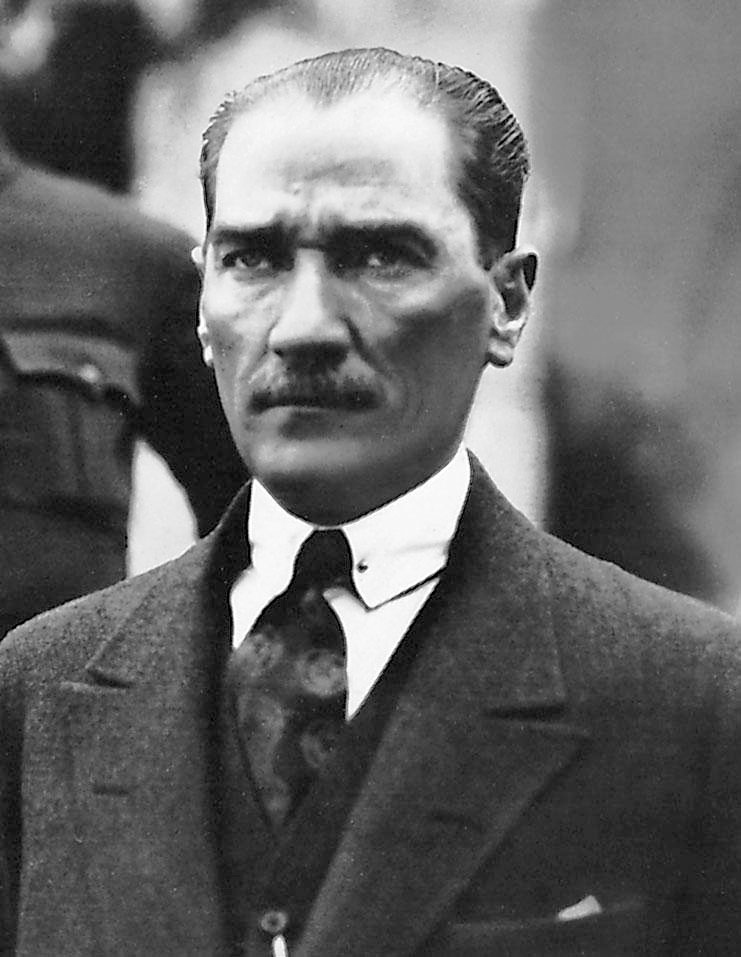
Kemal Atatürk

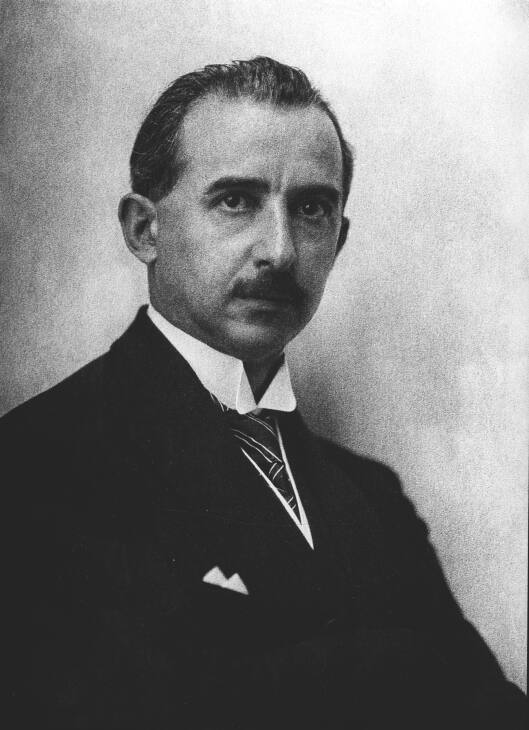
İsmet İnönü

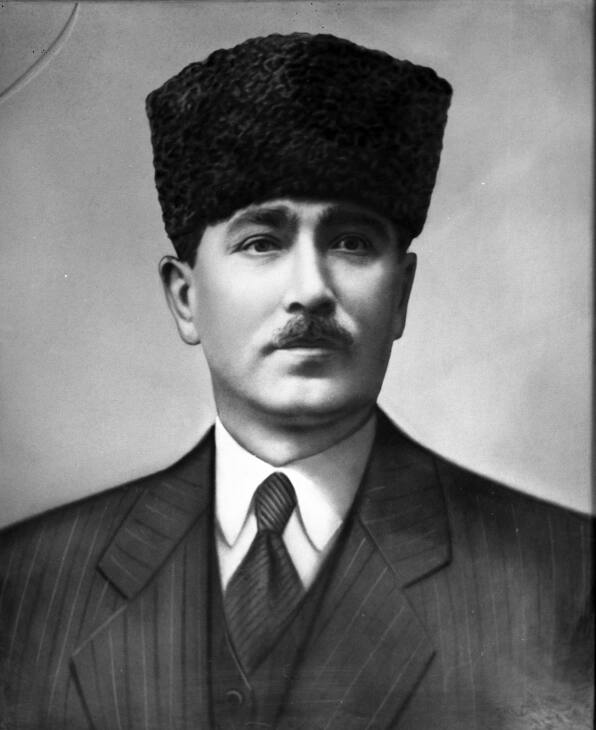
Fethi Okyar

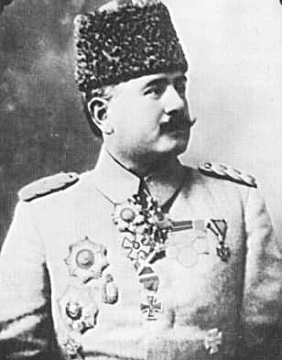
Kâzım Karabekir

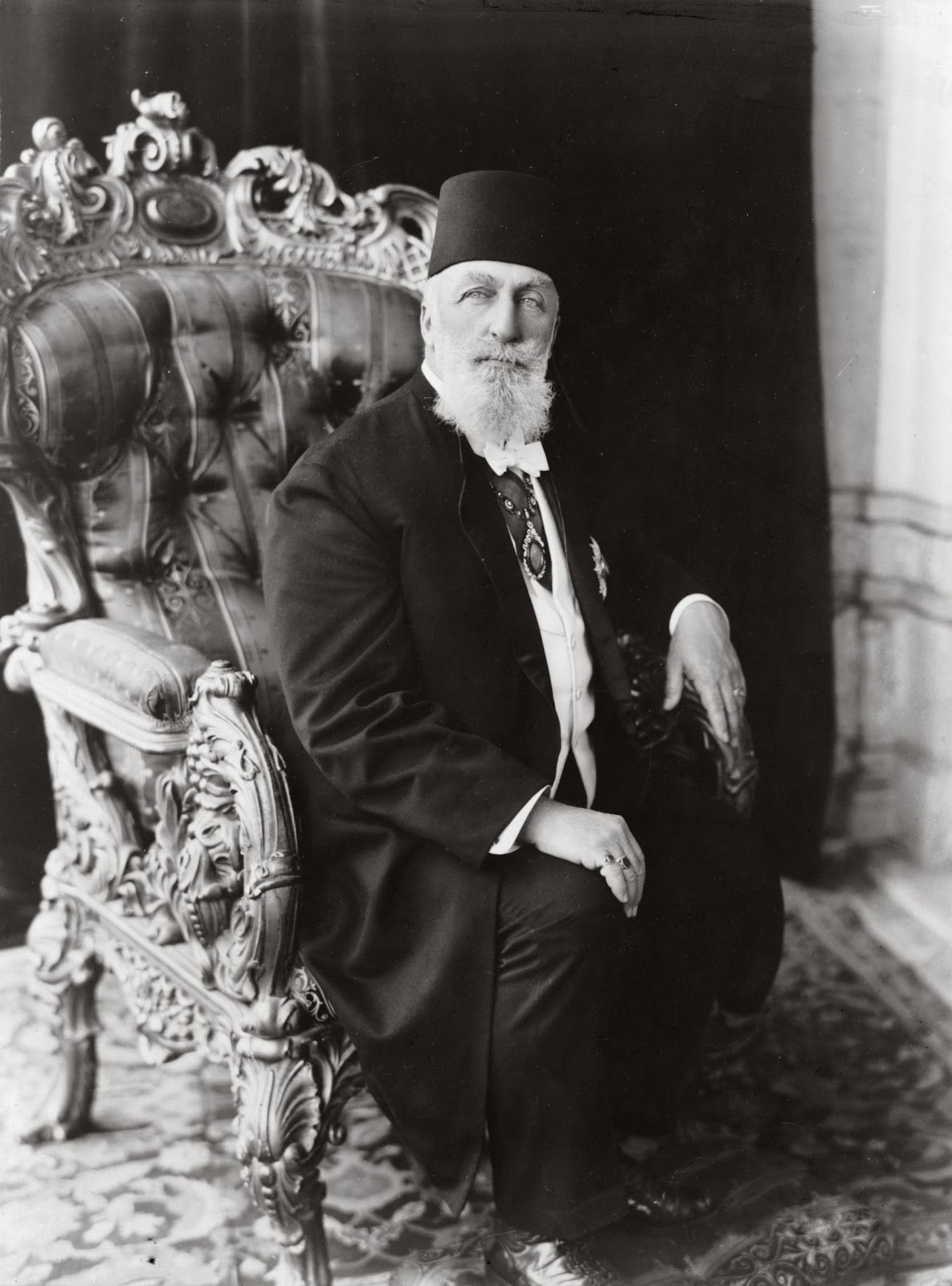
Abdülmecit II

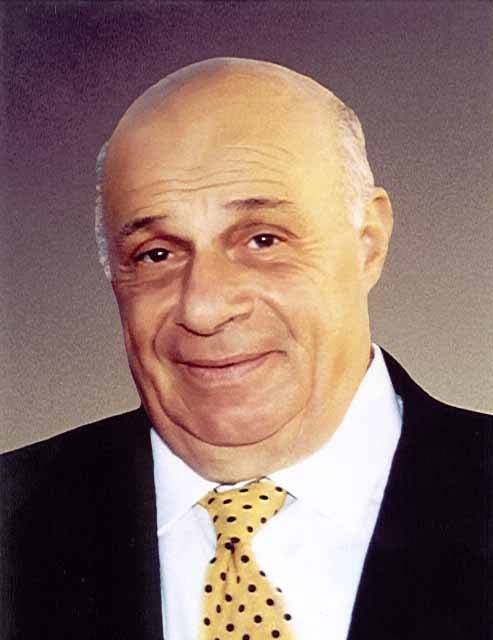
Rauf Denktaş

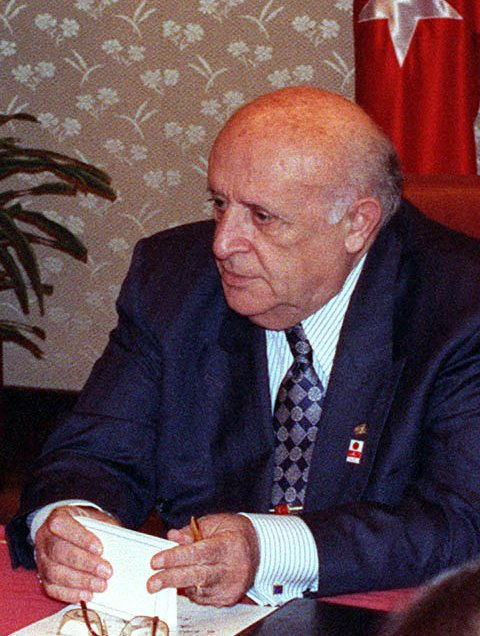
Süleyman Demirel

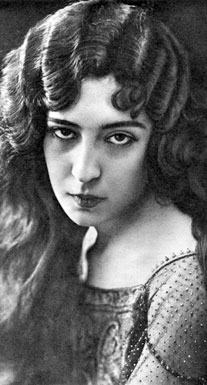
Fikriye

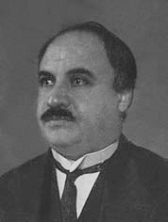
Ziya Gökalp

== See also ==
- Turkey at the 1924 Summer Olympics
