= 1927 in Turkey =

- Centuries: 20th; 21st
- Decades: 1920s; 1930s; 1940s
- See also: List of years in Turkey

Events in the year 1927 in Turkey.

== Parliament ==
- 2nd Parliament of Turkey (up to 1 September)
- 3rd Parliament of Turkey (from 1 September)

== Incumbents ==
- President – Kemal Atatürk
- Prime Minister – İsmet İnönü

== Ruling party and the main opposition ==
- Ruling party – Republican People's Party (CHP)

== Cabinet ==
- 4th government of Turkey (up to 1 November)
- 5th government of Turkey (from 1 November)

== Events ==
- 18 January – United States senate rejected the Treaty of Lausanne
- 1 February – General elections
- 7 March – End of the Independence Tribunals
- 1 July – President Kemal Atatürk visited Istanbul. First visit after 1917. (To establish Ankara as the new capital, he had purposely delayed his visit.)
- 27 August – A group of gangs led Hacı Sami entered Turkey via Samos (in Greece) to create chaos, but they were arrested
- 7 September – International court supported Turkish point of view on the Bozkurt–Lotus case (see 1926 in Turkey). Turkish lawyer Mahmut Esat was later surnamed Bozkurt
- 15 October – Kemal Atatürk in a six-day speech, called Nutuk, summarized the events in Turkish War of Independence
- 19 October – Kemal Atatürk’s will. CHP was the main beneficiary
- 28 October – Census (population 13,648,270)
- 30 October – Maintenance of the famous battleship Yavuz began.
- 3 November – New term of the parliament and the new government of İsmet İnönü
- 24 November - Statue of Victory, a monument in Ankara about the Turkish War of Independence (There will be others in the following years)
- 26 December – Marine accident The ship Sevinç sank

== Births ==
- 3 January – Nazmiye Demirel, wife Süleyman Demirel (former president)
- 28 January – Eşref Kolçak, actor
- 17 February – Ali Naili Erdem, lawyer and politician
- 27 March – Coşkun Kırca, academic, politician
- 22 June – Çetin Altan, journalist
- 13 July – Orhan Birgit, lawyer, journalist and politician
- 10 August – Nejat Uygur, theatre actor
- 13 October – Turgut Özal, president (1989–1993)
- 8 November – İlter Türkmen, diplomat
- 10 November – Vedat Dalokay, architect

== Deaths ==
- 4 January – Süleyman Nazif (born in 1870), poet
- 2 June – Hüseyin Avni Lifij (born in 1886), painter
- 13 July - Mimar Kemaleddin Bey (born in 1871), architect

== Gallery ==
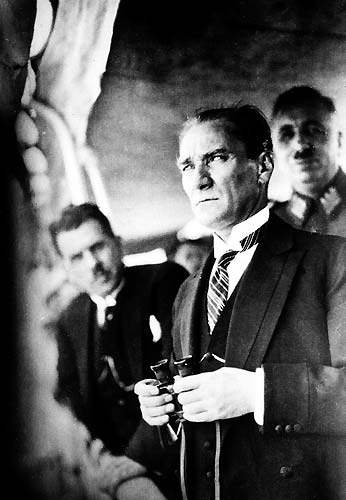
Kemal Atatürk

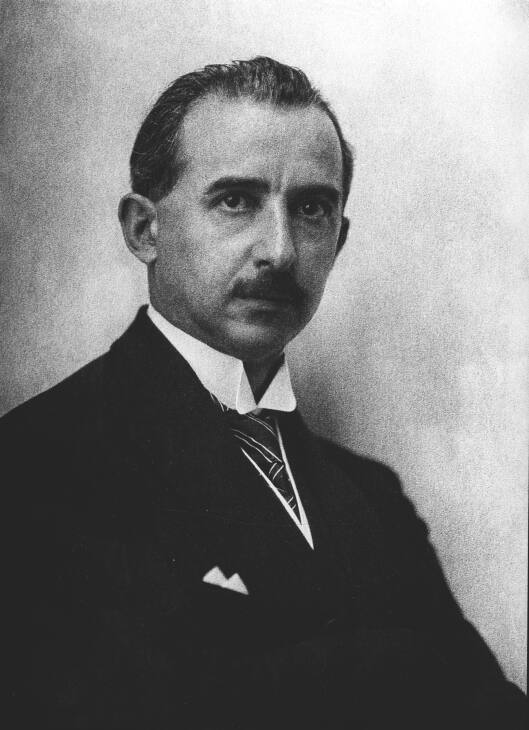
İsmet İnönü

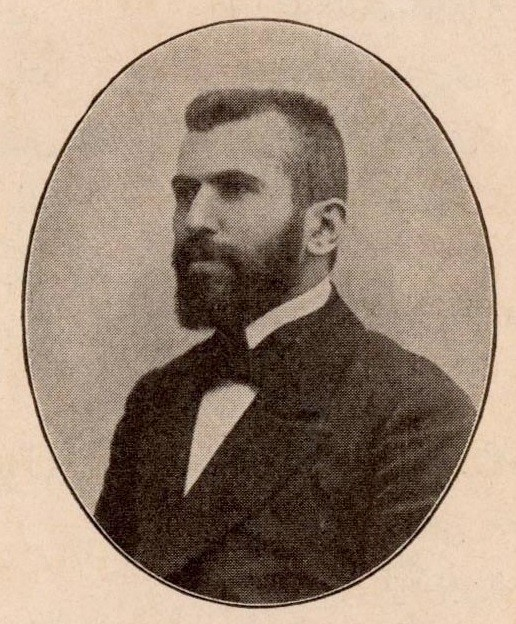
Süleyman Nazif

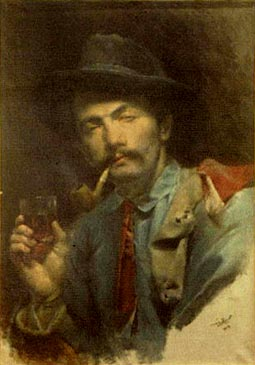
Hüseyin Avni Lifij (self portrait)

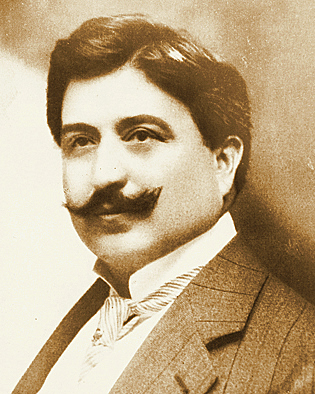
Mimar Kemalettin
