= Mete Sozen =

Mete Sözen
- Born: May 22, 1930; Istanbul, Turkey
- Died: April 5, 2018 (aged 87); London, England
- Education: Robert College (BS); University of Illinois Urbana-Champaign (MS, PhD)

Mete Avni Sözen (22 May 1930 – 5 April 2018) was Kettelhut Distinguished Professor of Structural Engineering at Purdue University, Indiana, United States from 1992 to 2018.

== Academic career ==
Sözen earned his undergraduate education at the Robert College School of Engineering in Istanbul (1951), and his master's (1952) and doctoral degrees (1957) from the University of Illinois at Urbana–Champaign. He earned his Ph.D. under the direction of Chester P. Siess and Nathan M. Newmark performing experimental studies to develop theories governing the shear strength of prestressed concrete girders. He then began his academic career at University of Illinois at Urbana–Champaign where he served on the faculty from 1957 through 1992.

The following students completed their Ph.D. dissertation under the direction of Mete Sözen:

- BRUCE, ROBERT NOLAN, JR., An Experimental Study of the Action of Web Reinforcement in Prestressed Concrete Beams (1962)
- GAMBLE, WILLIAM LEO, Measured and Theoretical Bending Moments in Reinforced Concrete Floor Slabs (1962)
- GERGELY, PETER, The effect of Reinforcement on Anchorage Zone in Prestressed Concrete Members (1962)
- JIRSA, JAMES OTIS, The Effects of Pattern Loadings on Reinforced Concrete Floor Slabs (1963)
- ROY, HEDLEY EDMUND HERBERT, A Failure Theory for Concrete (1963)
- VANDERBILT, MORTIMER DANIEL, Deflections of Reinforced Concrete Floor Slabs (1963)
- MOORE, WALTER PARKER, An Analytical Study of the Effect of Web Reinforcement on the Strength of Reinforced Concrete Beams Subjected to Combined Flexure and Shear (1964)
- LENSCHOW, ROLF JOHAN, A Yield Criteria for Reinforced Concrete under Biaxial Moments and Forces (1966)
- WELSH, WILLIAM AUSTIN, JR., Analysis and Control of Anchorage-Zone Cracking in Prestressed Concrete (1966)
- CARDENAS-ENRIQUEZ, ALEX, Strength and Behavior of Isotropically and Nonisotropically Reinforced Slabs Subjected to Combinations of Flexural and Torsional Moments (1968)
- FEDORKIW, JAMES PAUL, Analysis of Reinforced Concrete Frames with Filler Walls (1968)
- STOCKER, MANFRED FRANZ, A Hypothesis for the Nature of Bond between Strand and Concrete (1969)
- CRISWELL, MARVIN EUGENE, Strength and Behavior of Reinforced Concrete Slab-Column Connections Subjected to Static and Dynamic Loading (1970)
- FIORATO, ANTHONY EMIL, An Investigation of the Interaction of Reinforced Concrete Frames with Masonry Filler Walls (1971)
- GÜLKAN, POLAT. Behavior and Energy Dissipation of Reinforced Concrete Frames Subjected to High Level Base Motions (1971)
- KARLSSON, BENGT INGVAR, Shear Strength of End Slabs with and without Penetrations in Prestressed Concrete Reactor Vessels (1971)
- IMBEAULT, FERNAND ADELARD, Bilinear and Degrading Bilinear Response of Multistory Frames (1972)
- AKTAN, AHMET EMIN, Effects of Two-Dimensional Motion on a Reinforced Concrete Column (1973)
- OTANI, SHUNSUKE, Behavior of Multistory Reinforced Concrete Frames during Earthquakes (1973)
- STORM, JOHN HENRY, A Finite Element Model to Simulate the Non-Linear Response of Reinforced Concrete Frames with Masonry Filler Walls (1973)
- WIGHT, JAMES KENNETH, Shear Strength Decay in Reinforced Concrete Columns Subjected to Large Deflections (1973)
- HSU, LUNG WEN, Behavior of Multistory Reinforced Concrete Walls during Earthquakes (1974)
- ARISTIZABAL-OCHOA, JOSE DARIO, Behavior of Ten-story Reinforced Concrete Walls Subjected to Earthquake Motions (1977)
- LYBAS, JOHN MICHAEL, Effect of Beam Strength and Stiffness on Dynamic Behavior of Reinforced Concrete Coupled Walls (1977)
- ABRAMS, DANIEL PAUL, Experimental Study of Frame-Wall Interaction in Reinforced Concrete Structures Subjected to Strong Earthquake Motions (1979)
- CECEN, HALUK, Response of Ten Story Reinforced Concrete Model Frames to Simulated Earthquakes (1979)
- SAIIDI MOVAHHED, MEHDI, Simple and Complex Models for Nonlinear Seismic Response of Reinforced Concrete Structures (1979)
- MOEHLE, JACK PETER, Experiment to Study Earthquake Response of R/C Structures with Stiffness Interruptions (1980)
- MORRISON, DENBY GREY, Response of Reinforced Concrete Plate-Column Connections to Dynamic and Static Horizontal Loads (1981)
- ALGAN, BEKIR BULENT, Drift Damage Considerations in Earthquake-Resistant Design of Reinforced Concrete Buildings (1982)
- HOEDAJANTO, DRADJAT, A Model to Simulate Lateral-Force Response of Reinforced Concrete Structures with Cylindrical and Box Sections (1983)
- KREGER, MICHAEL EUGENE, An Experimental/Analytical Study of the Dynamic Response of Staggered Structural Wall Systems, (1983)
- FRENCH, CATHERINE ELLEN WOLFGRAM, Experimental Modeling and Analysis of Three One-Tenth Scale Reinforced Concrete Frame-Wall Structures (1984)
- BARIOLA BERNALES, JUAN J., Dynamic Stability of Adobe Walls (1986)
- SCHULTZ, ARTURO ERNEST, An Experimental and Analytical Study of the Earthquake Response of R/C Frames with Yielding Columns (1986)
- WOOD, SHARON LEE, Experiments to Study the Earthquake Response of Reinforced Concrete Frames with Setbacks (1986)
- LOPEZ, RICARDO RAFAEL, A Numerical Model for Nonlinear Response of R/C Frame-wall Structures (1988)
- STARK, ROBERTO. Evaluation of Strength, Stiffness and Ductility Requirements of Reinforced Concrete Structures Using Data from Chile (1985) and Michoacan (1985) Earthquakes (1988)
- BONACCI, JOHN FRANCIS. Experiments to Study Seismic Drift of Reinforced Concrete Structures (1989)
- EBERHARD, MARC OLIVIER. Experiments and Analyses to Study the Seismic Response of Reinforced Concrete Frame-Wall Structures with Yielding Columns (1989)
- WALTHER, HOWARD PHILLIP. Evaluation of Behavior and Radial Shear Strength of a Reinforced Concrete Containment Structure (1990)
- DE LA COLINA, JAIME. A Hysteresis Model for Reinforced Concrete Space Frame Structures (1993)
- DRAGOVICH, JEFFREY JOHN. An Experimental Study of Torsional Response of Reinforced Concrete Structures to Earthquake Excitation (1996)
- LEPAGE, ANDRES. A Method for Drift Control in Earthquake-Resistant Design for RC Building Structures (1997)
- BROWNING, JOANN P.. Proportioning of earthquake -resistant reinforced concrete building structures (1998)
- DÖNMEZ, CEMALETTIN. A Numerical Model to Simulate the Behavior of Reinforced Concrete Members Subjected to Biaxial Earthquake Excitation (1998)
- MATAMOROS, ADOLFO BENJAMIN. Study of Drift Limits for High Strength Concrete Columns (1999)
- KORU, BURAK Z.. Seismic Vulnerability Assessment of Low-Rise Reinforced Concrete Buildings (2002)
- PUJOL, SANTIAGO. Drift Capacity of Reinforced Concrete Columns Subjected to Displacement Reversals (2002)
- OZTÜRK, BAKI M.. Seismic Drift Response of Building Structures in Seismically Active and Near -Fault Regions (2003)
- GÜR, TÜREL. Earthquake Effects on Articulated Structures Located in Fault Rupture Zones (2004)
- SMITH, JHON PAUL. Wall-Frame Structures with Vulnerable Foundations (2004)
- AKIN, LILI A.. Behavior of Reinforced Concrete Frames with Masonry Infills in Seismic Regions (2006)
- MIAMIS, KONSTANTINOS. A Study of the Effect of Combined Impact and Fire on Structural Steel Framing (2007)
- FICK, DAMON R., Experimental Investigation of a Full-Scale Flat-Plate Reinforced Concrete Structure Subjected to Cyclic Lateral Loading in the Inelastic Range of Response (2008)
- BRACHMANN, INGO, On Efficient Modeling of High-Velocity Fluid Solid Impact (2008)
- BEDIRHANOGLU, IDRIS. Additionally, Sözen co-supervised Idris Bedirhanoglu at Istanbul Technical University, together with Prof. Alper Ilki. The title of Bedirhanoglu’s dissertation (2009) is “The Behavior of Reinforced Concrete Columns and Joints with Low Strength Concrete under Earthquake Loads: An Investigation and Improvement.”

== Earthquake engineering ==
With funding from the National Science Foundation and technical support from MTS Systems Corporation Sözen, Shunsuke Otani, Polat Gulkan, and Norbert Nielsen developed the first earthquake shaking simulators in the United States in 1967, which was housed at University of Illinois.

== Other contributions ==
Besides his academic interest in the development of design codes for concrete structures, Sözen was notable for his contributions to the official post 9/11–government studies of terrorist attacks, including the Oklahoma City bombing, and The Pentagon. Sözen also led a team that created an engineering simulation of American Airlines Flight 11 crashing into the North Tower of the World Trade Center. The computer–generated visualizations were made entirely from the simulation data.

In 1977, he was elected to the National Academy of Engineering.
