= Ferit Tüzün =

Turkish composer

Ferit Tüzün (24 April 1929, Istanbul – 21 October 1977, Ankara) was a Turkish composer. His works included the opera Midas'ın Kulakları (King Midas' Ears), on the tale of King Midas' ears.
