= SS Karadeniz =

Turkish ship (1905–1954)

History

Turkey
- Name: Karadeniz
- Operator: Turkish Maritime Organization
- Builder: Netherlands
- Completed: 1905
- Out of service: 1951
- Fate: Scrapped (1954)

General characteristics
- Type: Cruise liner
- Tonnage: 4,731 GT
- Length: 123.90 m (406.5 ft)
- Beam: 14 m (46 ft)
- Draft: 8.28 m (27.2 ft)
- Installed power: 3,600 hp (2,700 kW)
- Propulsion: De Schelde type three cylinder engine
- Speed: 14 kn (26 km/h; 16 mph)
- Crew: 123

SS Karadeniz (Turkish: Karadeniz Vapuru), meaning Black Sea, was a Turkish cruise liner, which was refitted as a travelling exhibition vessel to promote the 1923-established Republic of Turkey and to display export products of agriculture and fishery, mining, weaving, medicine as well as carpets, various industrial equipment and artwork including paintings and sculptures from Turkey. The vessel started her exhibition trip in June 1926, and visite 15 ports of European countriess in the Mediterranean Sea, Atlantic Ocean, and Baltic Sea. It aimed to create political, cultural and touristic relations between countries and to improve many new cooperation opportunities.

== Ship's characteristics ==
Karadeniz, a coal-fired steam ship, was built in the Netherlands in 1905. She was 123.90 m (406.5 ft) long, had a beam of 14 m (46 ft) and a draft of 8.28 m (27.2 ft). Having 4,731 GT, she was powered by De Schelde type three cylinder engine generating 3,600 hp (2,700 kW). She could cruise at 14 kn (26 km/h; 16 mph) when fully steamed.

Following the exhibition mission, she continued to run on domestic lines. In 1951, she was taken out of service, and was finally scrapped at Genao, Italy in 1954.

== Background of the travelling exhibition ==
The issue of travelling exhibition first came to the agenda of the Grand National Assembly of Turkey during the budget negotiations of the Ministry of Commerce in 1925. The proposal to open a trade exhibition within the country was abandoned due to the concern that whether visitors would come from Europe. Instead, Minister of Commerce Ali Cenani put forward the idea of creating a travelling exhibition by buying a cruise liner from the Turkish Maritime Organization (Ottoman Turkish: Seyr-i Sefā'in), especially the SS Karadeniz. It was suggested that the vessel, which can accommodate 130 people, including some notable guests and the merchants, who would display their products, would be refitted for exhibition of export products, artwork and handicraft articles. The parliament accepted the project, and so allocated 89,450 Lira for the rental of the ship for the purpose of travelling exhibition almost three years after the proclamation of the Republic. A notification regarding the purpose and scope of the travelling exhibition visiting the most important European ports was published in the Official Gazette on 6 May 1925.==

== Ship's preparation ==
Among the two largest ships of the Turkish Maritime Organization in consideration, Gül Cemal and Karadeniz, the latter was found more suitable for the travelling exhibition format.

Karadeniz was towed to the Haliç Shipyard at Golden Horn in Istanbul for repair and maintenance works on 1 April 1926. The tender for the refittimg of the ship was awarded to Architect Muammer Asım for 9,500 Lira. First, a balcony-like bridge was added to the ship to connect it to the outside. In addition, two sections and related departments were created for the display and sale of products. A place for İşbank branch was built. Electrical oven, ice producing device and a telephone were installed. The ship's decoration was created according to a Turkish-style oriental architecture. Originally in black, the entire ship was painted in white. All the preparation works in the shipyard completed towards the end of May 1926.

== Crew ==
During the journey, the ship had a total of 123 crew. The ship's captain was Lütfi, known as Topuz, the second mate Süreyya Gürsu, the third mate Asım Alnıak and the fourth mate Vedat Karaaslan. Apart from these staff, the ship's crew consisted of five chief engineers, four engineers, seven engine officers, two radio operators, one caulker, four helmsmen, twelve crewmen, eighteen coalmen, nineteen cooks, thirty-eight stewards, six cranemen, one boiler, one taylor and one shoemaker.

== Notable passengers ==
Coming from Bursa, Mustafa Kemal Atatürk, the founder and the first president of the Republic, got on board on 13 June 1926 at Mudanya and travelled during a lunch the short distance until Bandırma, where he got off the ship.

Among the passengers of Karadeniz were Refi Bayar, the son of the 3rd President Celal Bayar, poet Kemalettin Kamu, one of the founders of the Anadolu Agency, Osman Zeki Üngör, the composer of the national anthem, Bedia Arseven, one of the first Turkish female journalists, Mebrure Gönenç, one of the first Turkish female members of the parliament, and musician Veli Kanık, the father of the poet Orhan Veli Kanık.

The ship was also home to the Presidential Symphony Orchestra.

== The voyage ==
Decorated with flags, Karadeniz set sail with a ceremony from Tophane Wharf, Istanbul on 12 June 1926. Following a short stop in Mudanya and Bandırma, the voyage continued on 13 June 1926. Apart from a stop at Bona in Algeria, renamed later to Annaba, where she was for coal supply, the ship visited 15 ports in 12 European countries, staying two to four days at each port. The ship travelled a total of 9,981 mi (8,673 nmi) using 2,778 t (2,734 long tons; 3,062 short tons) coal and 971 t (956 long tons; 1,070 short tons) fresh water. On 5 September 1926, she returned home after 86 days and 22 hours.

Voyage of Karadeniz as travelling exhibitiın ship.
Outward			Return		
Date	Port	Country	Date	Port	Country
12.06.1926	Istanbul	Turkey	29.07.1926	Leningrad	Soviet Union
17.06.1926	Bona	Algeria	01.08.1926	Gdańsk	Poland
20.06.1926	Barcelona	Spain	03.08.1926	Gdynia	Poland
02.07.1926	Le Havre	France	05.08.1928	Copenhagen	Denmark
04.07.1926	London	England	10.08.1926	Antwerp	Belgium
10.07.1926	Amsterdam	Netherlands	21.08.1926	Marseille	France
16.07.1926	Hamburg	Germany	24.08.1926	Genoa	Italy
21.07.1926	Stockholm	Sweden	27.08.1926	Naples	Italy
25.07.1926	Helsinki	Finland	05.09.1926	Istanbul	Turkey

== Port activities ==
Visitors at every port were accepted to board the ship and to take a tour. The floating exhibition undertook not only an economic but also a cultural mission to promote the country. In this regard, coordination was achieved between the visitors and Turkish private institutions. Books and brochures on various aspects of the Republic of Turkey, such as the newly established country's constitution, agricultural development, banking, cooperatives, insurance companies, coal mines, ports, economic organizations, etc., prepared by the Chairman of the Exhibition Organizing Committee, were available for the visitors. Receptions were held, and the Presidential Symphony Orchestra gave concerts. Visitors were able to socialize with the notable Turkish people on board at the balls.

== Exhibition items ==
The Exhibition Organization Committee divided the country in seven geographic regions, and sent an official to each region to study which goods can be put on the exhibition. After the decision of the committee, following items were selected:

Woven products
Coton, woolen, mohair, hemp and silk fabric,

Mining products
Gold, silver, chromium, coal, mercury, manganese, emery, sulfur, silvery lead, asbestos, copper, meerschaum, onyx marble, black amber, mine salt and ash,

Cereals
Birdseed

Herbs and medical products
Flaxseed, thuja, linden, marshmallow, buckthorn, tragacanth, opium poppy, poppy, fleece, sage, anise, licorice, gum arabic, pine resine, tar, peganumblack cumin, orchid, tobacco (raw or processed), cannabis,

Snack
Coffee beans, dried cherries, dried mulberry, almond, hazelnut, walnut, chestnut, raisins, dried figs,

Jam and candies
Candies, dried fruit pulp, grape molasses, sweet slurry, molasses sausages, tahini halva, honey,

Fish products
Caviar, fish roe,

Various
Olive, olive oil, sesame oil, soap, candle,
Ocra, broad beans, pea, chcickpea, bean, sesame, kidney bean, rice, barley, wheat, oat,

Perfumery
Eau de Cologne, rose oil, thyme oil,

Leather, carpets
Furs, raw leathers, carpet

Artwork
Paintings, sculptures, embroideries, calligraphy, tiles, porcelain, mirror,

Others
Paper, cardboard, music instruments, dental instruments, agricultural ans industrial tools and equipment, wicker products, furniture, lighting products, jewelry, etc.

Also interestingly, an Angora goat was aboard.
