= 4th Parliament of Turkey =

Grand National Assembly from 1931 to 1935

The 4th Grand National Assembly of Turkey existed from 25 April 1931 to 1 March 1935. There were 348 MPs in the parliament all of which were the members of the Republican People's Party (CHP).

== Main parliamentary milestones ==
Some of the important events in the history of the parliament are the following:

- 5 May 1931 – Mustafa Kemal Pasha (Atatürk) was elected as the president of Turkey for the third time
- 5 May 1931 – İsmet Pasha (İnönü) of CHP formed the 7th government of Turkey
- 31 May 1933 – Law 2252: Modern university instead of the traditional Darülfünun
- 3 February 1934 - Law 2381: Parliament approved the Balkan Pact
- 21 June 1934 – Law 2525: Surname Law
- 26 November - Law 2590: Ottoman-era titles such as pasha were banned to be used in public
- 5 December 1934 – Turkish women gained full suffrage
- 8 February 1935 – General elections in which 17 of the MPs were female

Preceded by 3rd Parliament of Turkey	4th Parliament of Turkey; Kâzım Özalp; 2 April 1931 – 1 March 1935	Succeeded by 5th Parliament of Turkey
