= Didem =

Didem (IPA: [diːˈdem]) is a feminine Turkish given name, from Persian "dide"+ Turkish first person pronoun "m"; meaning the “pupil of my eye”, “my beloved one”, “darling”. It may refer to:

== Given name ==
- Diğdem Hoşgör (born 1991), Turkish handball player
- Didem Balık (born 1974), Turkish opera singer
- Didem Ege (born 1988), Turkish volleyball player
- Didem Erol (born 1975), Turkish actress
- Didem Karagenç (born 1993), Turkish footballer
- Didem Kinali (born 1986), Turkish belly dancer
- Didem Taş (born 1992), Turkish footballer
- Didem Ünsal (born 1966), Turkish journalist, television presenter and author

== Fictional characters ==
- Didem, main character in 2011 Turkish romantic comedy film And Then What?
