= 1989 in Turkey =

- Centuries: 20th; 21st
- Decades: 1960s; 1970s; 1980s; 1990s; 2000s
- See also: List of years in Turkey

Events in the year 1989 in Turkey.

== Parliament ==
- 18th Parliament of Turkey

== Incumbents ==
- President –

Kenan Evren (up to 9 November)
Turgut Özal (from 9 November)

- Prime Minister –

Turgut Özal (up to 9 November)
Yıldırım Akbulut (from 9 November)

- Leader of the opposition – Erdal İnönü

== Ruling party and the main opposition ==
- Ruling party – Motherland Party (ANAP)
- Main opposition – Social Democratic Populist Party (SHP)

== Cabinet ==
- 46th government of Turkey (up to 9 November)
- 47th government of Turkey (from 9 November)

== Events ==
=== June ===
- 11 June – Some 2,000 Bulgarian Turks deported to Turkey following forced name changes.
- 11 June – Fenerbahçe wins the championship of the championship
- 15 June – 4 new provinces established: Aksaray, Bayburt, Karaman and Kırıkkale

=== September ===
- 17 September – Central Bank announces that rescheduled foreign debts have been repaid.

=== October ===
- 21 October – Two Syrian warplanes shoot down a civil cartography plane within Turkey, killing five.
- 31 October – Parliament elects Prime Minister Turgut Özal as President.

=== September ===
- 17 September – Weightlifter Naim Süleymanoğlu wins 4 gold medals in the Athens World Weightlifting Championships.

=== November ===
- 9 November – President Turgut Özal appoints Yıldırım Akbulut as the new prime minister.
- 17 November – Yıldırım Akbulut elected chairman of Motherland Party.
- 29 November – Turkey approves European Social Charter.

=== December ===
- 8 December – The United Communist Party announces its intention to regain its legal status.

== Births ==
- 1 January – Fatih Avan, javelin thrower
- 27 January – Melek Hu (Naturalized citizen), table tennis player
- 28 January – Gamze Tazim, actress
- 9 February – Deniz Aslan, footballer
- 22 February – Gülşah Gümüşay, basketball player
- 17 May - Kadir Korkut, poet and writer
- 21 May – Gülcan Mıngır, middle distance runner
- 5 July – Dilara Buse Günaydın, swimmer
- 10 September – Tolga Ünlü, footballer
- 28 September – Çağla Büyükakçay, tennis player
- 10 October – Rıza Kayaalp, wrestler
- 29 October – Leyla Tuğutlu, model and beauty pageant contestant
- 8 November - Can Yaman, actor
- 10 December – İlknur Melis Durası, engineer and model

== Deaths ==
Hakkı Yeten

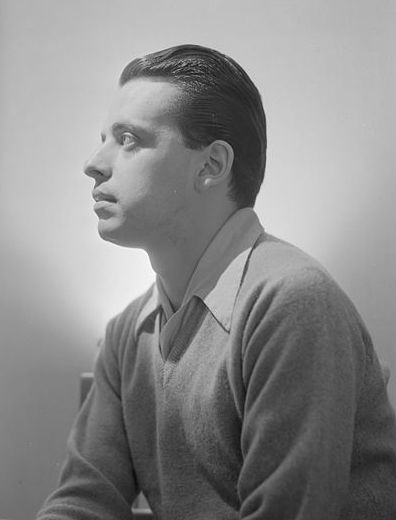
Nesuhi Ertegün

=== January ===
- January 12 - Adil Candemir, wrestler (b. 1917)
- January 20
  - Mete Adanır, footballer (b. 1961)
  - Muzaffer Badalıoğlu, footballer (b. 1960)

=== February ===
- February 15 - Hüseyin Akbaş, wrestler (b. 1933)

=== March ===
- March 6 - Fecri Ebcioğlu, songwriter and composer, (b. 1929)
- March 13 - Fahrettin Özdilek, military officer, politician and interim Prime Minister of Turkey (b. 1898)

=== April - June ===
- April 16 - Hakkı Yeten, footballer, football manager and sports executive (b. 1910)
- April 18
  - Adil Atan, wrestler (b. 1929)
  - Candan Tarhan, footballer and football manager (b. 1942)
- June 24 – Saadet Çağatay, turkologist, professor and writer(b. 1907)

=== July ===
- July 15 - Nesuhi Ertegün, record producer and executive of Atlantic Records (b. 1925)

=== August ===
- August 14 – Bergen, singer (b. 1959)

=== September ===
- September 13 – İsmail Rüştü Aksal, civil servant and politician (b. 1911)
- September 21 – Ertem Eğilmez, film director, producer and screenwriter (b. 1929)

=== October - December ===
- October 9 – Yusuf Atılgan, novelist (b. 1921)
- December 15 – Ali Şen, actor (b. 1918)

== Gallery ==
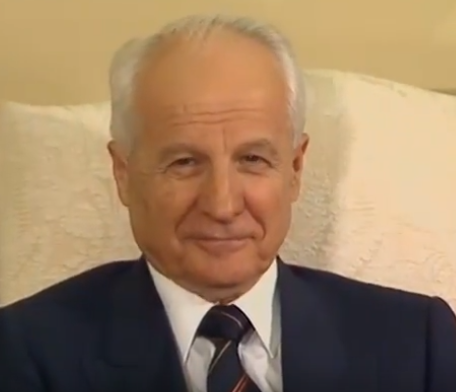
Kenan Evren

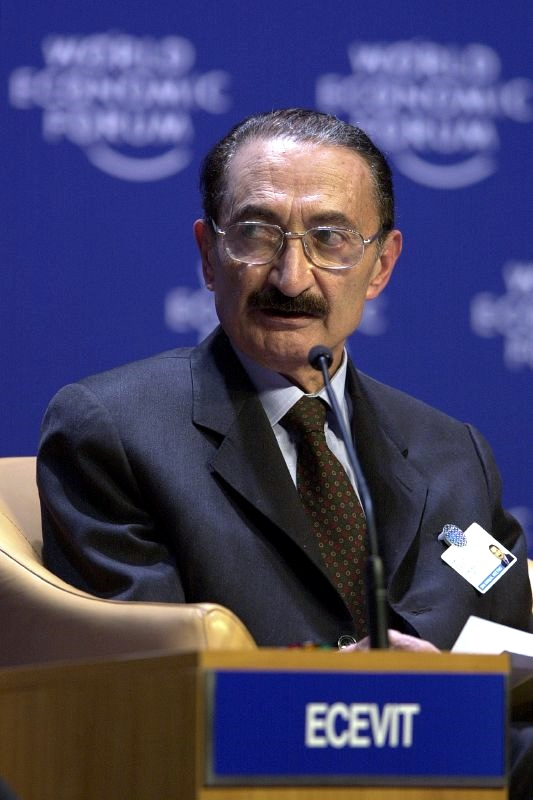
Bülent Ecevit

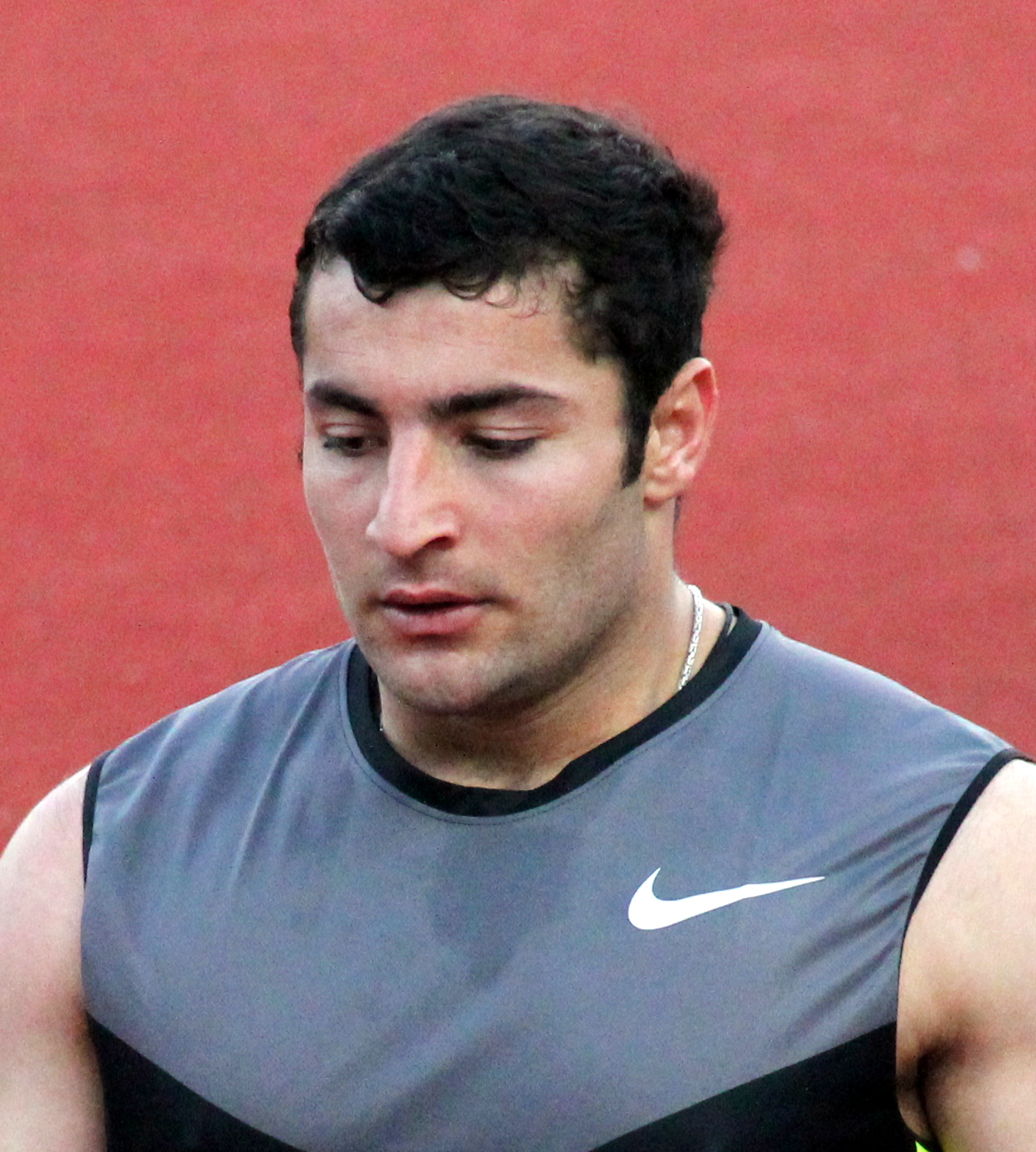
Fatih Avan

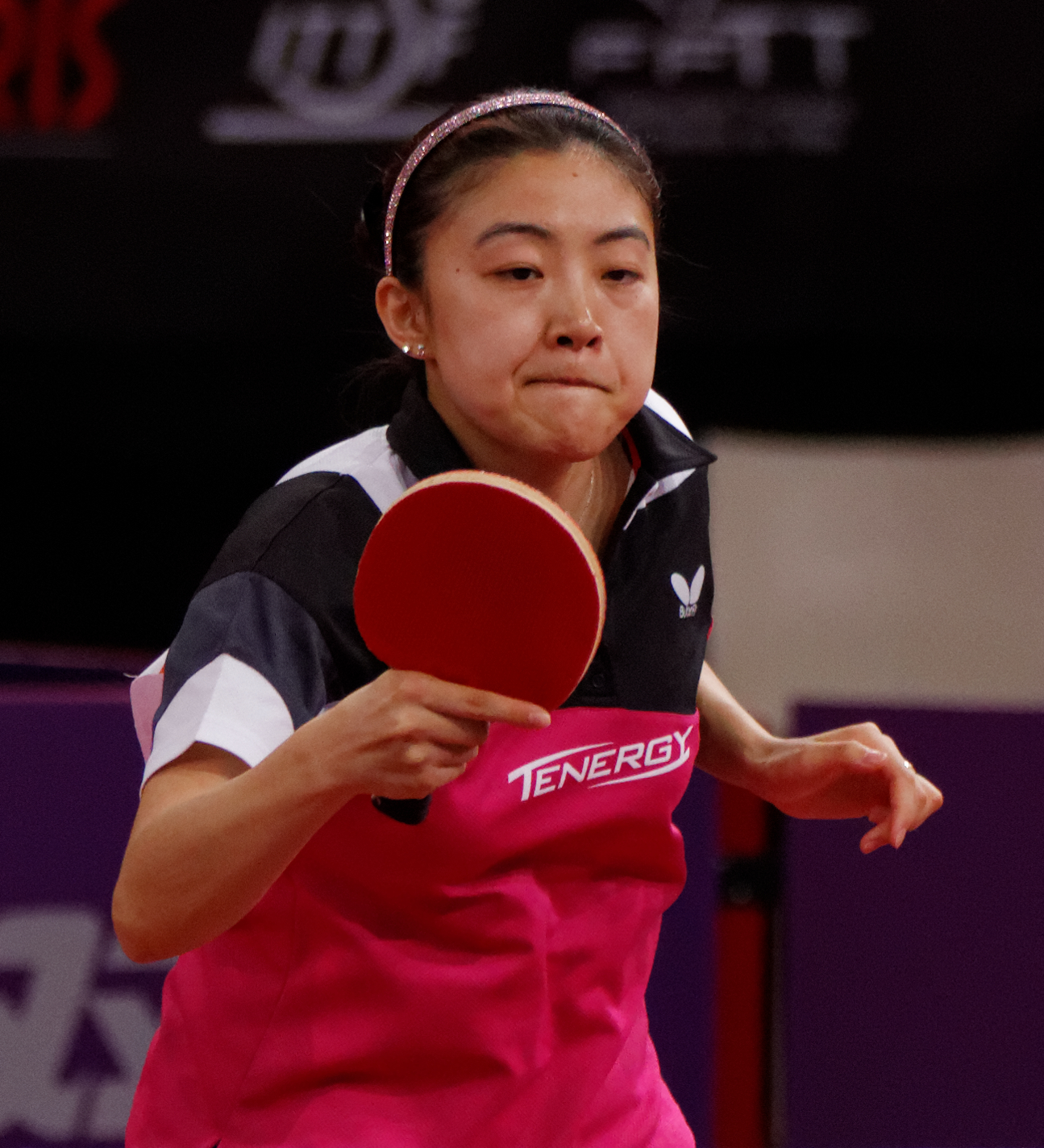
Melek Hu

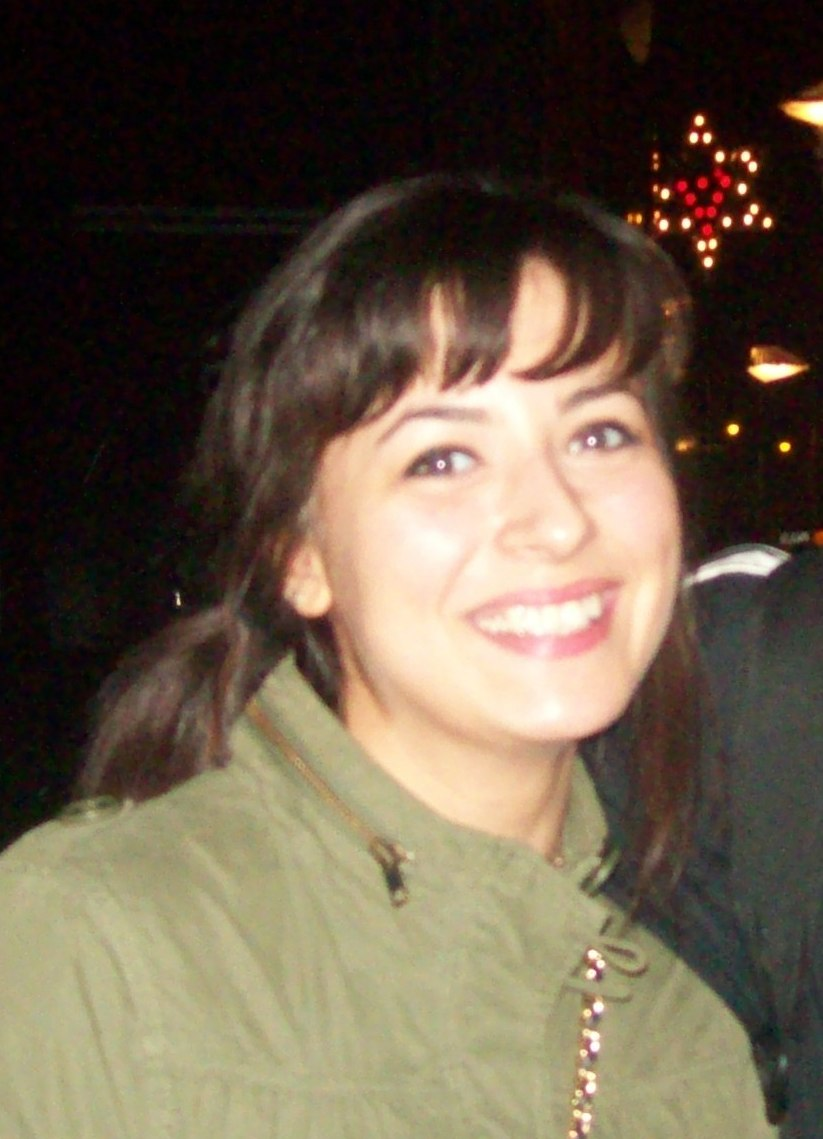
Melek Tazim

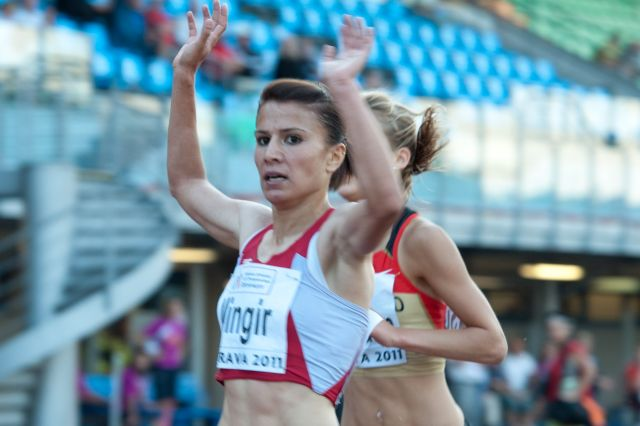
Gülcan Mıngır

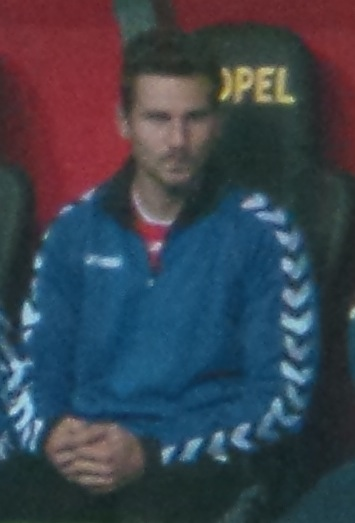
Tolga Ünlü

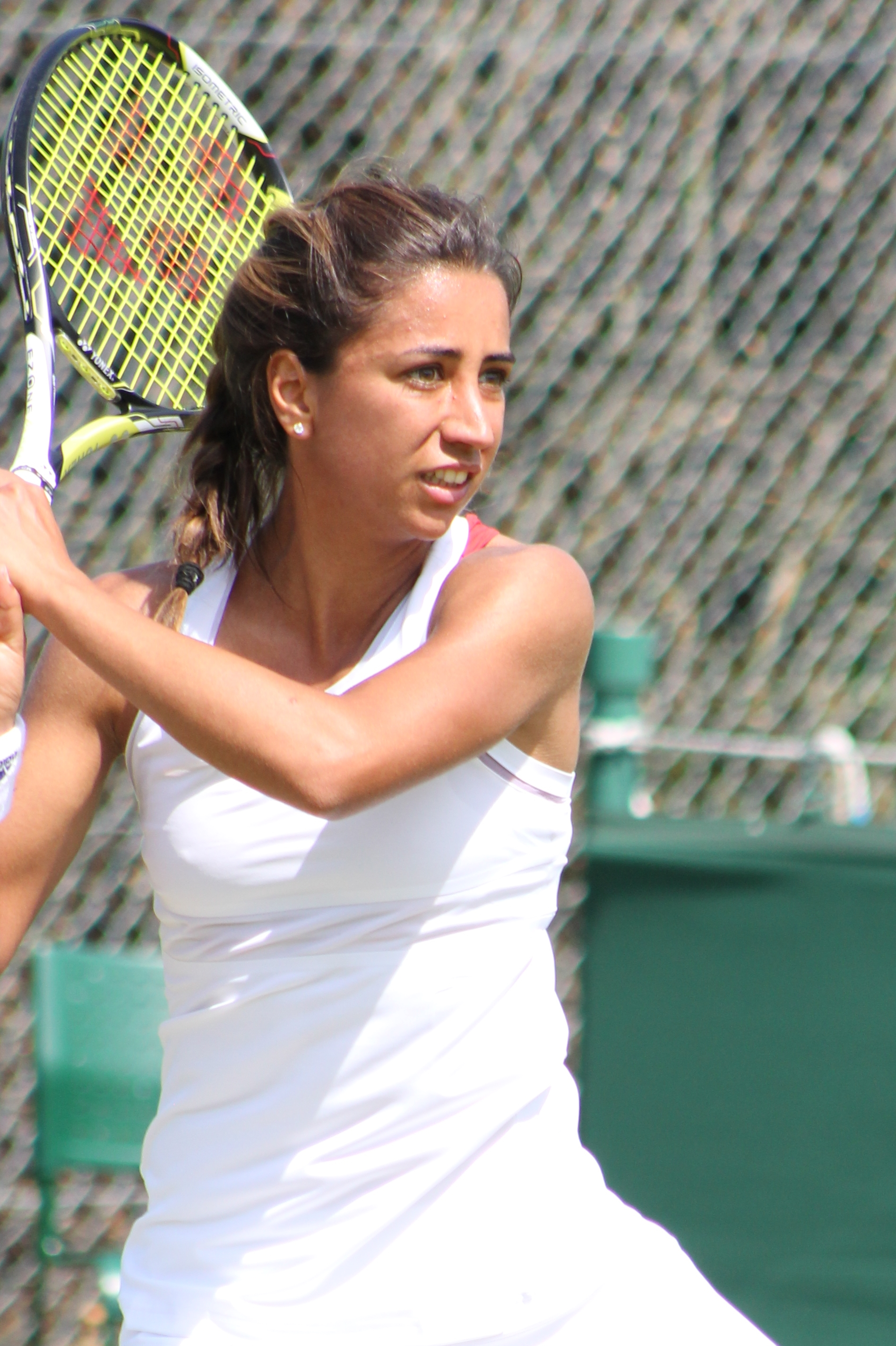
Çağla Büyükakçay

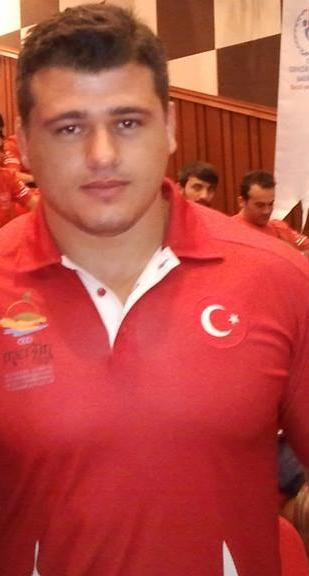
Rıza Kayaalp

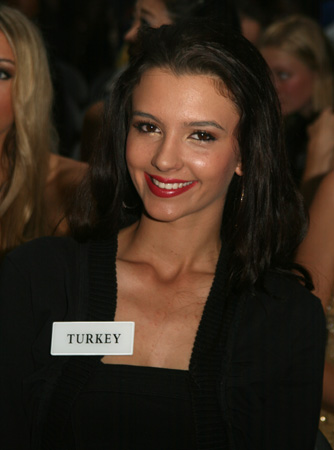
Leyla Tuğutlu

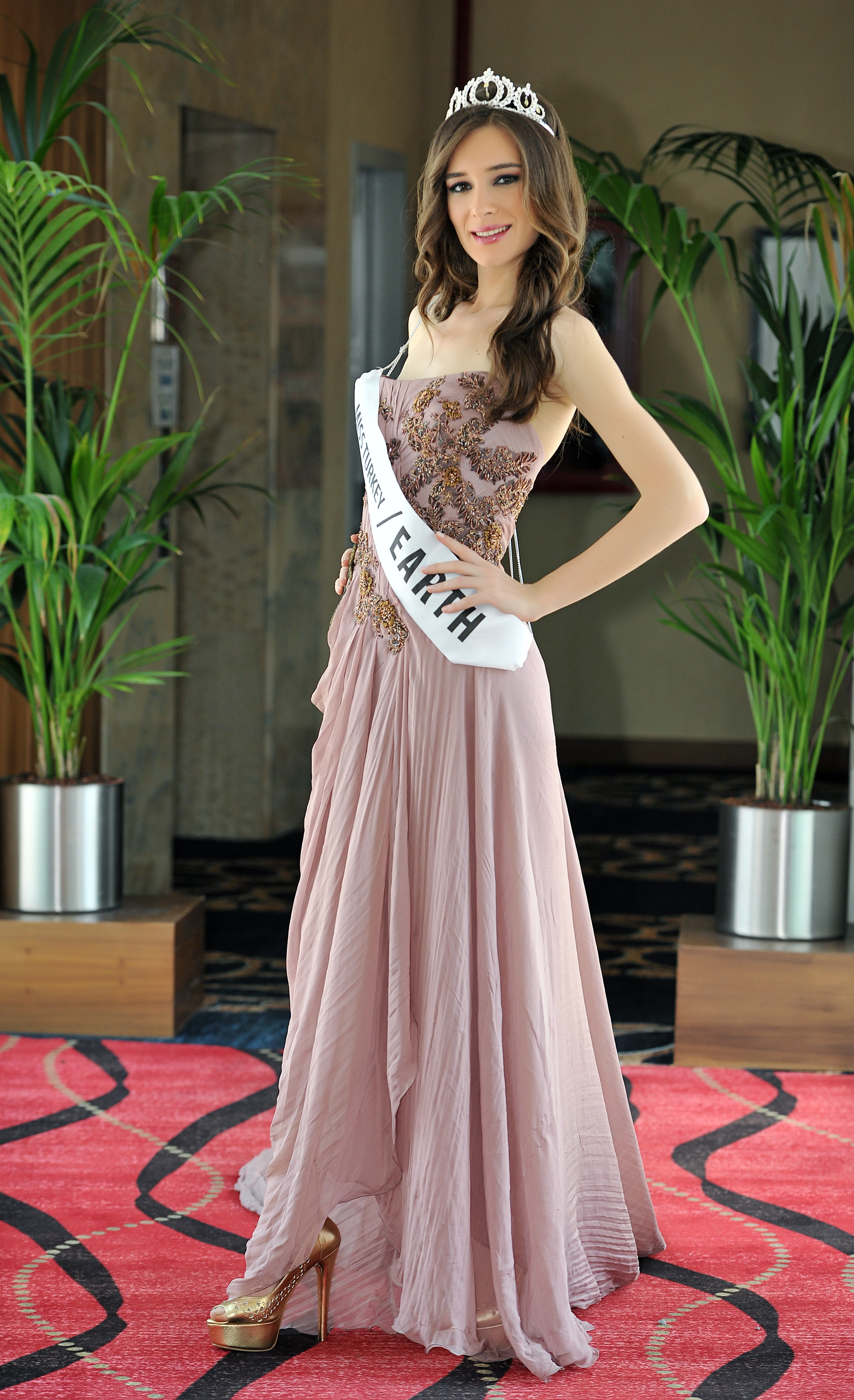
İlknur Melis Durası

== See also ==
- Turkey in the Eurovision Song Contest 1989
- 1988–89 1.Lig
