= 1988 in Turkey =

Turkey Events 1988

- Centuries: 20th; 21st
- Decades: 1960s; 1970s; 1980s; 1990s; 2000s
- See also: List of years in Turkey

Events in the year 1988 in Turkey.

== Parliament ==
- 18th Parliament of Turkey

== Incumbents ==
- President – Kenan Evren
- Prime Minister – Turgut Özal
- Leader of the opposition – Erdal İnönü

== Ruling party and the main opposition ==
- Ruling party – Motherland Party (ANAP)
- Main opposition – Social Democratic Populist Party (SHP)

== Cabinet ==
- 46th government of Turkey

== Events ==
=== January ===
- 11 January – Turkey signs Council of Europe’s convention on “Prevention of Torture and Inhuman or Degrading Treatment or Punishment.”
- 25 January – Turkey signs United Nations’ international convention against inhuman treatment and torture.

=== February ===
- 1 February – Socialist Party founded.
- 28 February – First heart transplant in Turkey (Ankara University)

=== April ===
- 6 April – State visit of British prime minister Margaret Thatcher.
- 27 April – Naim Süleymanoğlu wins three gold medals in Cardiff European Weightlifting Championships.

=== May ===
- 29 May – Galatasaray wins the championship

=== June ===
- 26 June – State visit of Kenan Evren to the United States.

=== July ===
- 3 July – Second bridge over the Bosporus opens.
- 12 July – State visit of Evren to Great Britain.

=== September ===
- 20 September – Naim Süleymanoğlu wins gold in the 1988 Summer Olympics in Seoul.

=== October ===
- 16 October – State visit of Evren to West Germany.
- 22 October - Esat Oktay Yıldıran was assassinated by PKK.

=== November ===
- 20 November – Suat Atalık gains the title Grandmaster in Chess Olympiad.

=== December ===
- 3 December – Council of Higher Education, the highest body of Turkish universities, lifts ban against Islamic-style head scarves for female university students.
- 8 December – Constitutional Court rejects request by chief prosecutor to close down Socialist Party.
- 16 December – State visit of Turgut Özal to the United States.

== Births ==
- 5 January – Ziya Erdal, footballer
- 8 January – Burcu Erbaş, basketball player
- 2 February – Turgut Doğan Şahin, footballer
- 10 April – Özgürcan Özcan, footballer
- 1 May – Tuğçe Şahutoğlu, hammer thrower
- 11 May – Tuğçe Hocaoğlu, volleyball player
- 31 May – Didem Ege, volleyball player
- 8 June – Begüm Dalgalar – basketball player
- 13 July – Neriman Özsoy, volleyball player
- 7 September – Yağmur Koçyiğit, volleyball player
- 26 September – Servet Tazegül, taekwondo practitioner
- 28 September – Bahar Çağlar, basketball player
- 15 October – Mesut Özil, footballer

== Deaths ==
- 8 January – Duygu Aykal (born 1943), ballerina
- 21 January – Cemal Reşit Eyüpoğlu (born 1906), lawyer, politician and journalist
- 24 March – Turhan Feyzioğlu (born 1922), lawyer, politician
- 18 April – Oktay Rifat (born 1914), novelist
- 1 May – Altan Erbulak (born 1929), caricaturist, theatre actor
- 31 May – Lütfi Akadlı (born 1902), lawyer
- 3 September – Ferit Melen (born 1906), former prime minister (35th government of Turkey)
- 29 September – Sıtkı Yırcalı (born 1908), politician

== Gallery ==
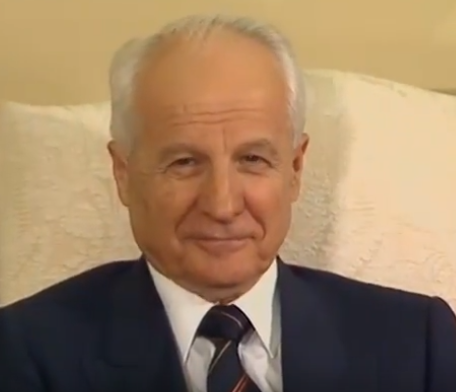
Kenan Evren

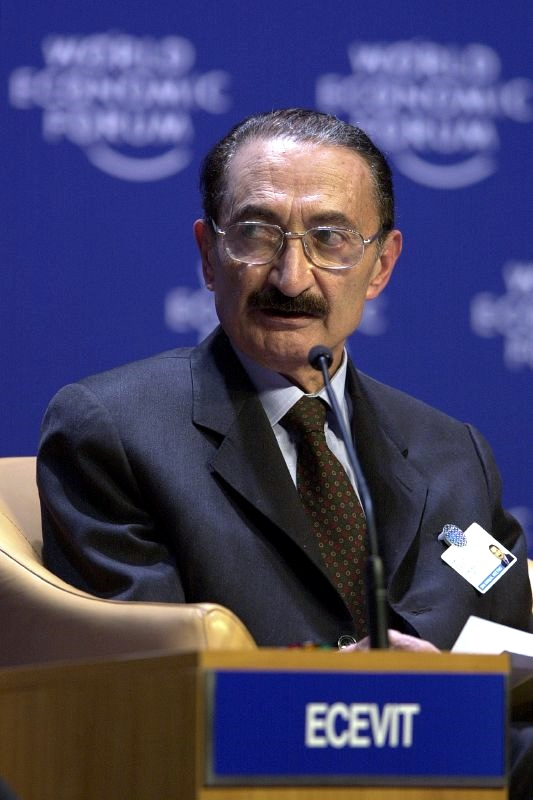
Bülent Ecevit

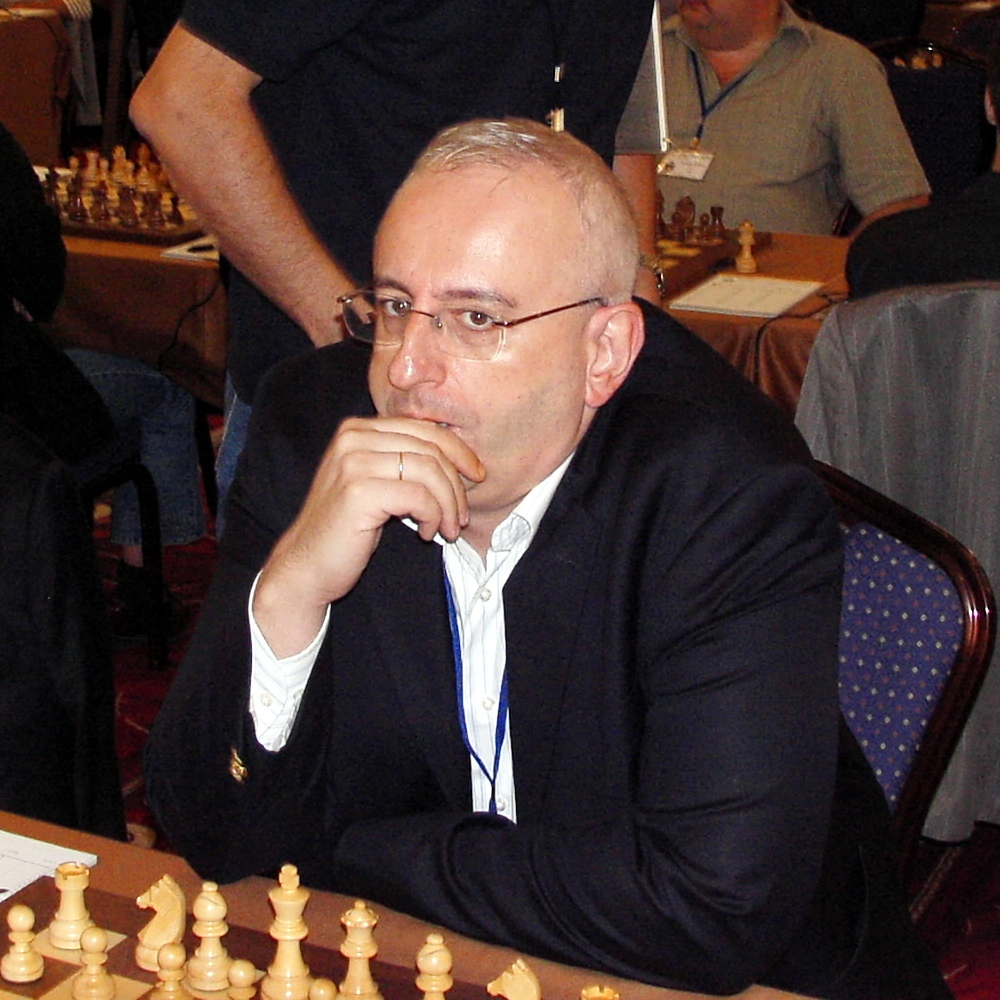
Suat Atalık

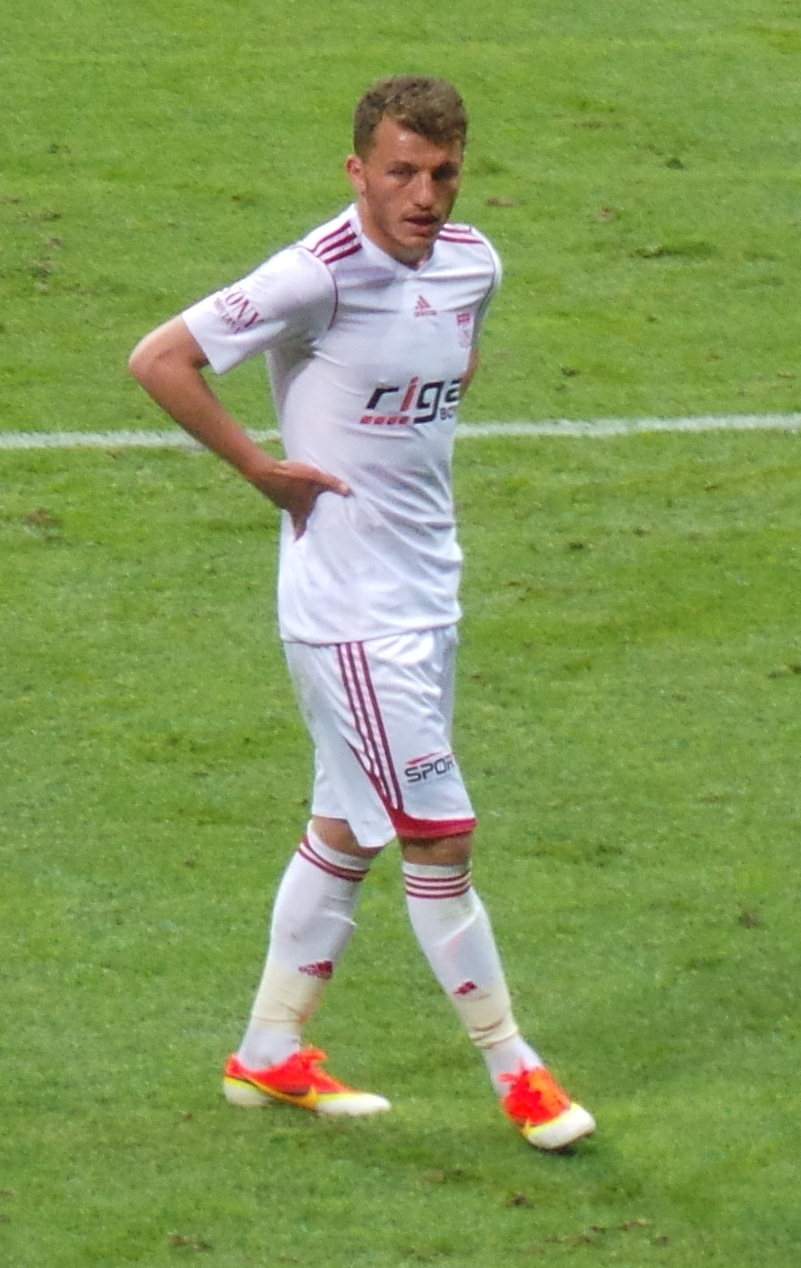
Ziya Erdal

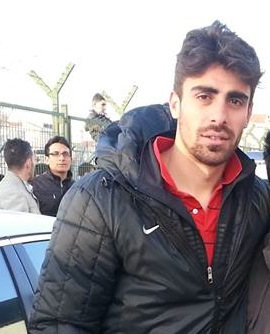
Turgut Doğan Şahin

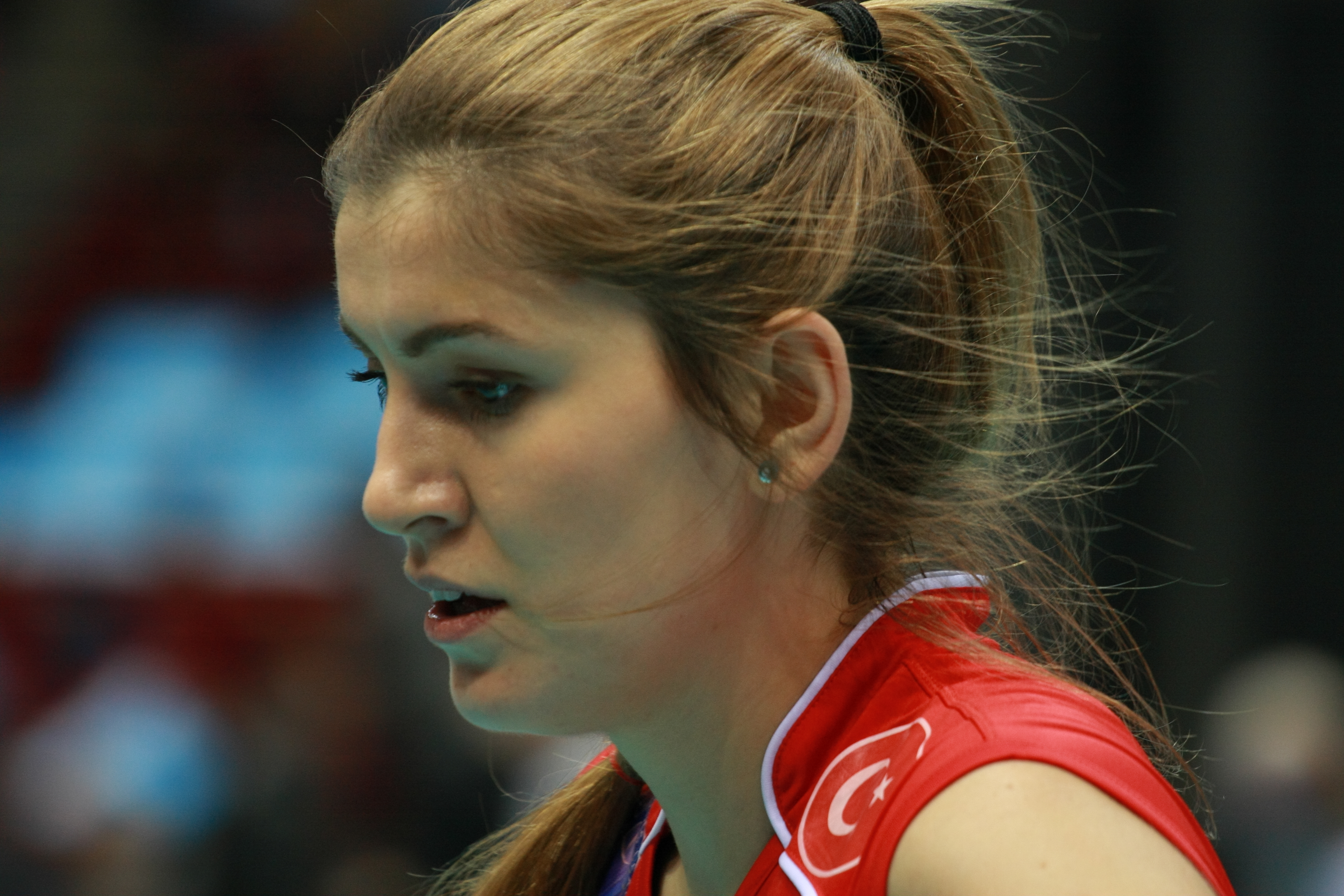
Tuğçe Hocaoğlu

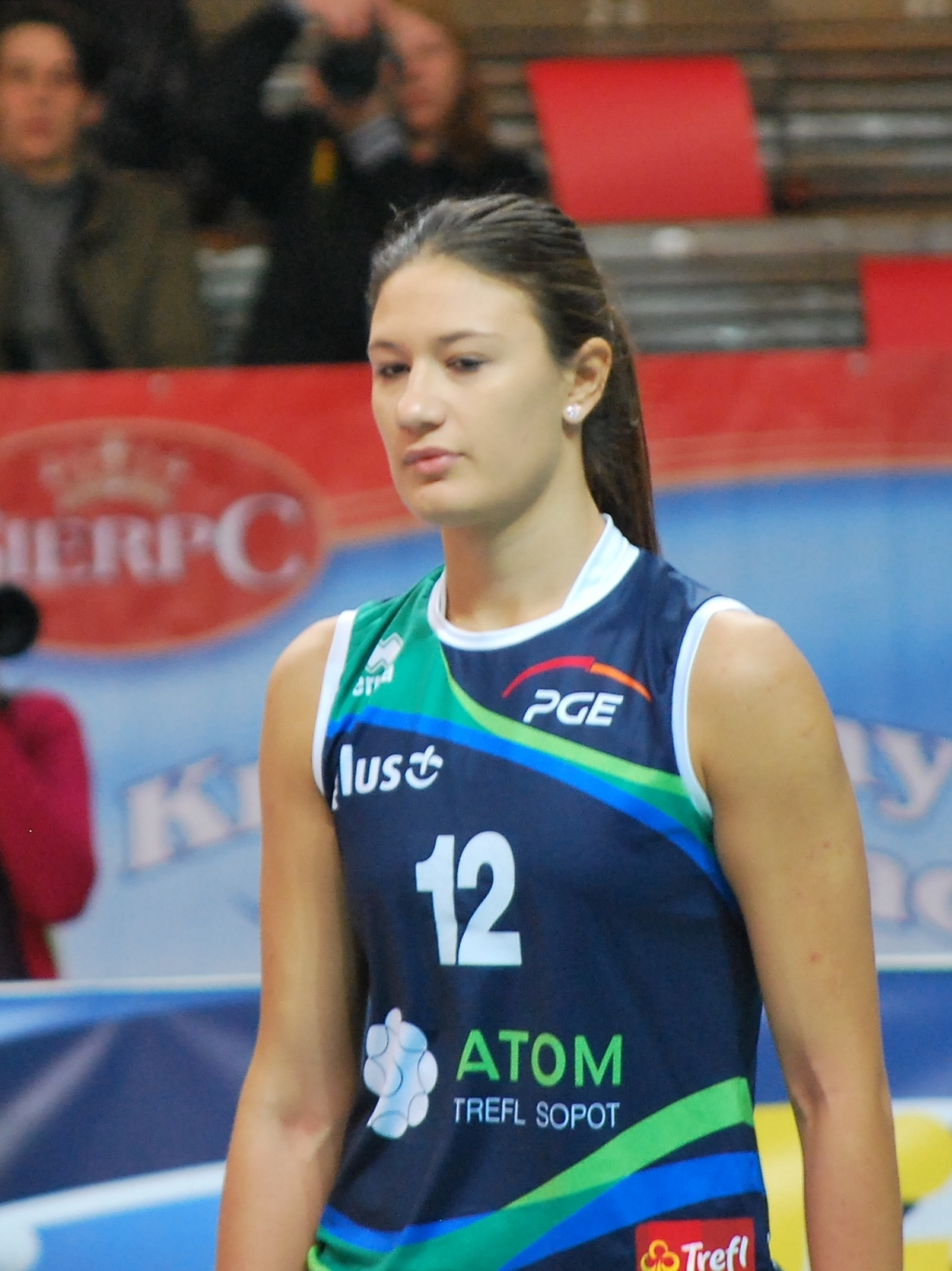
Neriman Özsoy

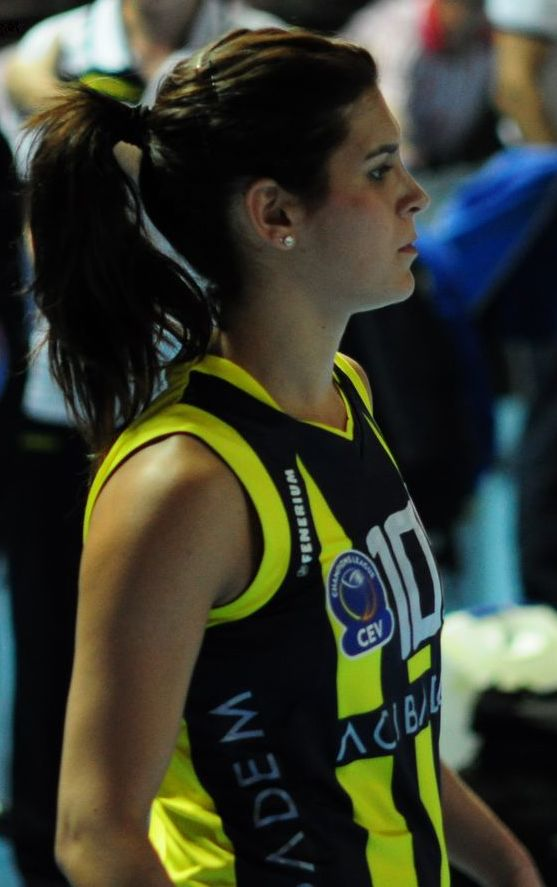
Yağmur Koçyiğit

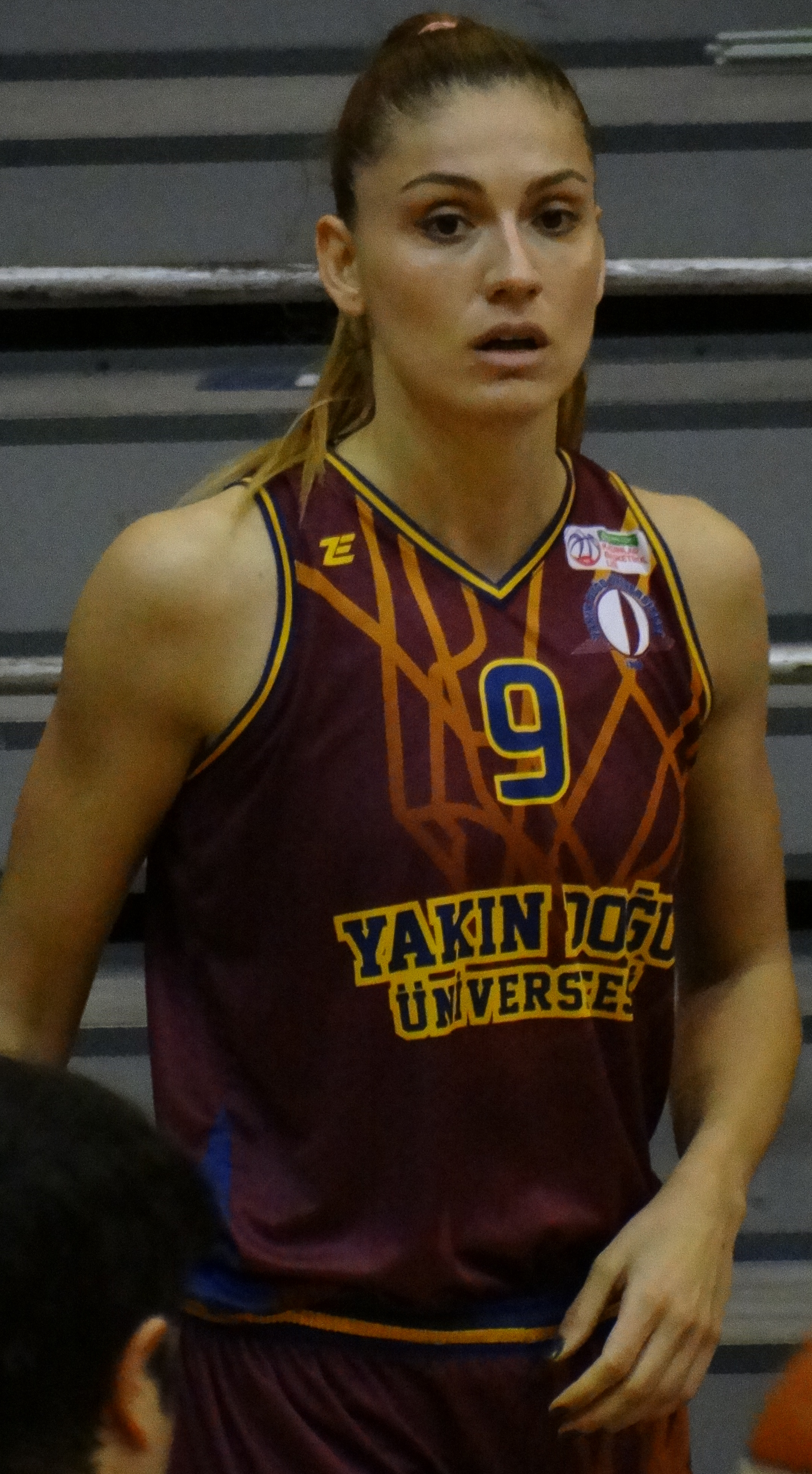
Bahar Çağlar

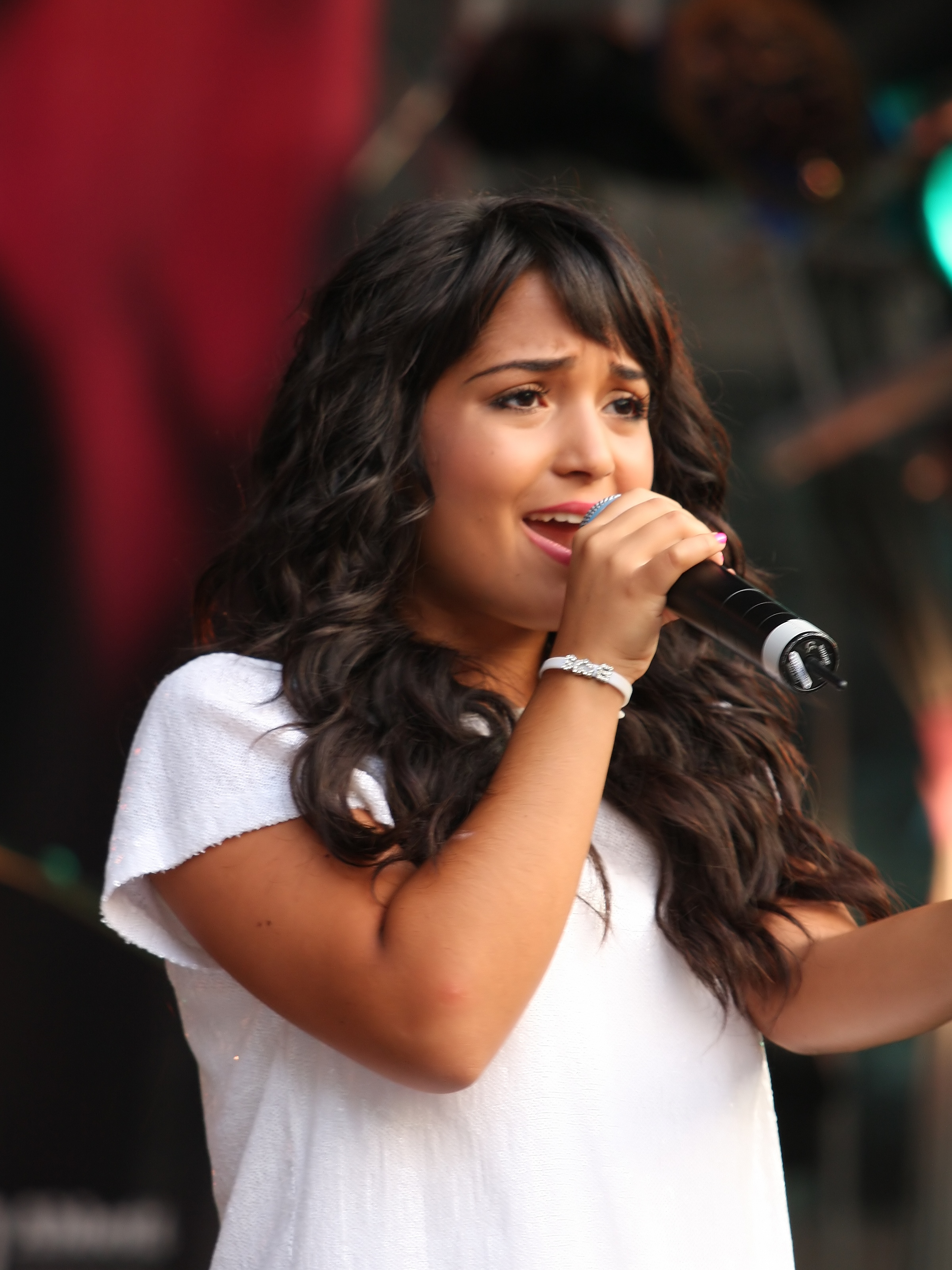
Bahar Kızıl

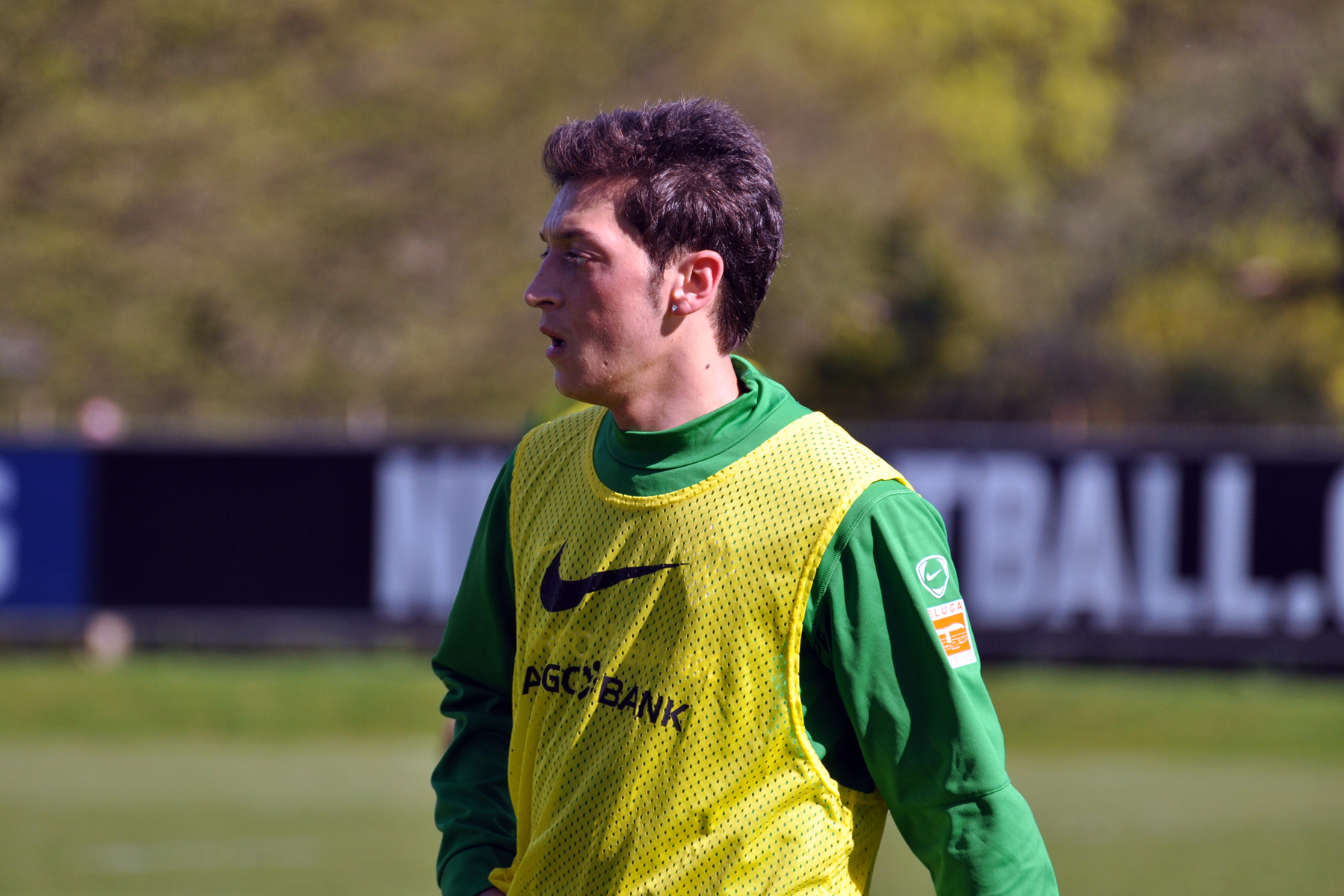
Mesut Özil

== See also ==
- Turkey in the Eurovision Song Contest 1988
- 1987–88 1.Lig
- Turkey at the 1988 Summer Olympics
- Turkey at the 1988 Winter Olympics
