= 1987 in Turkey =

- Centuries: 20th; 21st
- Decades: 1960s; 1970s; 1980s; 1990s; 2000s
- See also: List of years in Turkey

Events in the year 1987 in Turkey.

== Parliament ==
- 17th Parliament of Turkey (up to 29 November)
- 18th Parliament of Turkey

== Incumbents ==
- President – Kenan Evren
- Prime Minister – Turgut Özal
- Leader of the opposition – Erdal İnönü

== Ruling party and the main opposition ==
- Ruling party – Motherland Party (ANAP)
- Main opposition – Social Democratic Populist Party (SHP)

== Cabinet ==
- 45th government of Turkey (up to 21 December)
- 46th government of Turkey (from 21 December)

== Events ==
=== January ===
- 10 January – Bülent Ecevit receives an 11-month prison sentence for political speeches.
- 11 January – 2,500 bus passengers temporarily stranded in Kızıldağ Pass due to heavy snowfall.
- 13 January – Avalanche in Tunceli Province results in 12 fatalities.
- 14 January – Vehbi Koç named Businessman of the Year by the International Chamber of Commerce.
- 25 January – Suleiman the Magnificent Exhibit in the United States
- 25 January – Evren attends a two-day summit in Kuwait.

=== April ===
- 7 April – Alparslan Türkeş sentenced to 11 years in prison.
- 14 April – Turkey applies for full membership in the European Community.

=== June ===
- 7 June – Galatasaray wins the championship
- 29 June – General Necip Torumtay is named chief of general staff.

=== August ===
- 13 August – PKK militants kill 25 villagers in Siirt Province.

=== September ===
- 13 September – Bülent Ecevit named chairman of Democratic Left Party.
- 24 September – Süleyman Demirel named chairman of True Path Party.

=== October ===
- 4 October – Alparslan Türkeş named chairman of Nationalist Work Party.
- 11 October – Necmettin Erbakan named chairman of Welfare Party.

=== November ===
- 29 November – Motherland Party wins the majority of seats in Parliament in the general elections.

== Births ==
- 1 January – Serdar Özkan, footballer
- 1 February – Barış Ataş, footballer
- 30 January – Arda Turan, footballer
- 15 February – Volkan Bekçi, footballer
- 3 May – Damla Sönmez, actress
- 16 May – Can Bonomo, singer
- 14 August – Sinem Kobal, actress
- 14 September – Ceyda Ateş, actress
- 25 September – Mustafa Yumlu, footballer

== Deaths ==
- 14 January – Turgut Demirağ (born in 1921), film producer
- 24 March – Ekrem Zeki Ün (born in 1910), musician
- 5 July – İdris Küçükömer (born in 1925), economist
- 22 July – Örsan Öymen (born in 1938), journalist
- 22 July – Fahrettin Kerim Gökay (born in 1900), civil servant, politician
- 8 October – İsmet Sıral (born in 1927) musician
- 10 October – Behice Boran (born in 1910), politician
- 12 October – Fahri Korutürk (born in 1903), former president (1973–1980)
- 11 December – Adile Naşit (born in 1930), actress

== Gallery ==
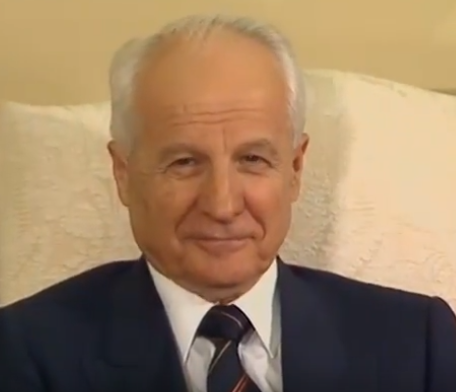
Kenan Evren

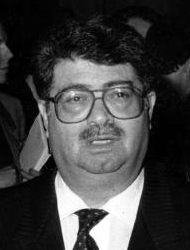
Turgut Özal

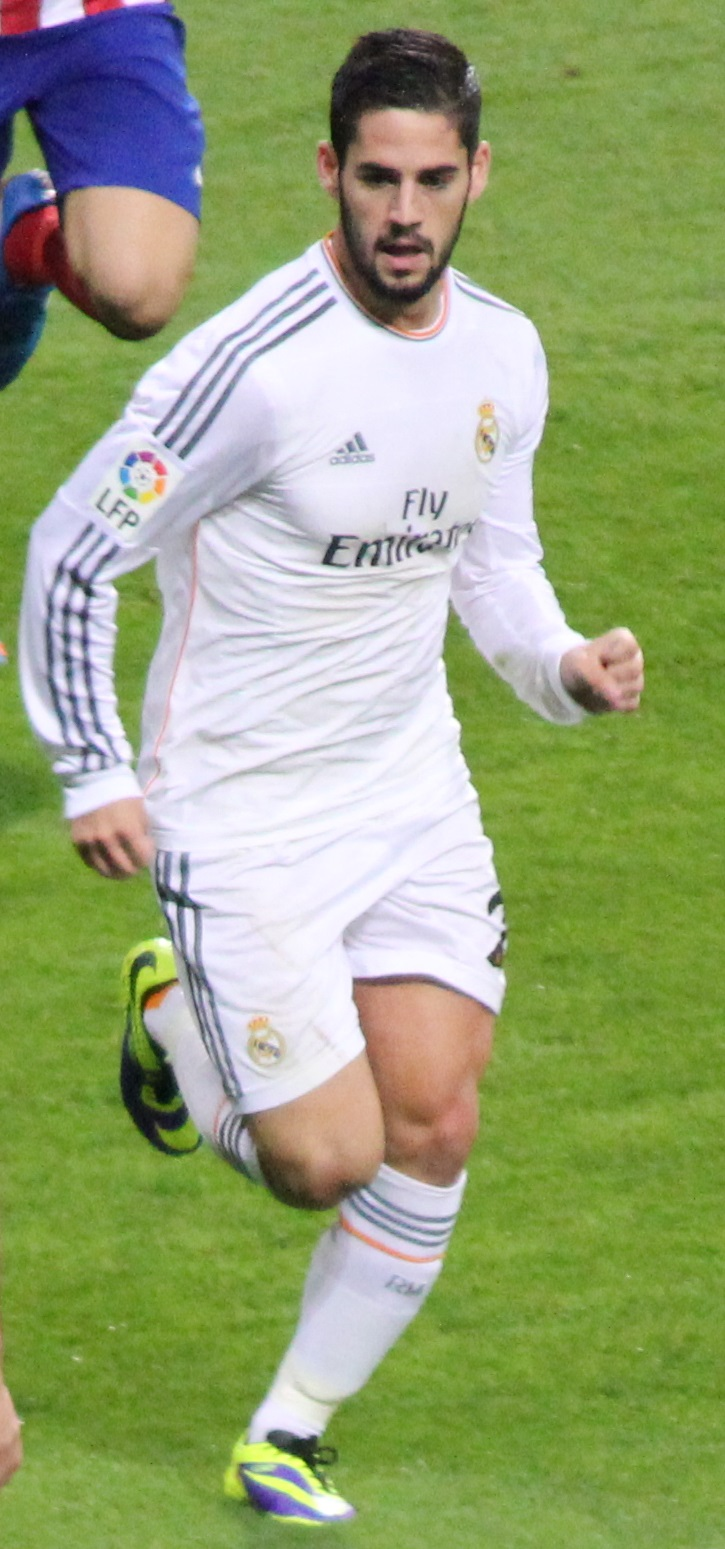
Arda Turan

== See also ==
- Turkey in the Eurovision Song Contest 1987
- 1986–87 1.Lig
