= 1990 in Turkey =

- Centuries: 20th; 21st
- Decades: 1970s; 1980s; 1990s; 2000s; 2010s
- See also: List of years in Turkey

Events in the year 1990 in Turkey.

== Parliament ==
- 18th Parliament of Turkey

== Incumbents ==
- President – Turgut Özal
- Prime Minister – Yıldırım Akbulut
- Leader of the opposition – Erdal İnönü

== Ruling party and the main opposition ==
- Ruling party – Motherland Party (ANAP)
- Main opposition – Social Democratic Populist Party (SHP)

== Cabinet ==
- 47th government of Turkey

== Events ==
=== January ===
- 12 January – Pegasus Airlines, low-cost carrier founded.

=== May ===
- 1 May – May Day events result in 1,100 arrests.
- 17 May – Democratic Center Party of Bedrettin Dalan established.
- 20 May – Beşiktaş wins the championship

=== June ===
- 4 June – Turkish United Communist Party founded.
- 7 June – People's Toiling Party founded.

=== August ===
- 8 August – In the aftermath of the Invasion of Kuwait, Turkey closes the pipeline carrying Iraqi oil to the Mediterranean.

=== September ===
- 18 September – Turkey and the United States extend their Defense and Economic Cooperation Agreement.

=== October ===
- 21 October – Census (population 56,473,005)

=== November ===
- 19 November – Turkey reduces its conventional forces in Europe as the Cold War draws to a close.

=== December ===
- 3 December – Chief of general staff General Necip Torumtay resigns.
- 5 December – Parliament votes to establish Parliamentary Human Rights Commission.
- 19 December – Government asks NATO for military assistance along the border with Iraq.

== Births ==
- 14 February – Sefa Yılmaz, footballer
- 17 March – Merve Aydın, middle-distance runner
- 3 May – Burcu Ayhan, high jumper
- 16 July – Büşra Cansu, volleyball player
- 21 November – Bülent Uzun, footballer

== Deaths ==
- 9 January – Cemal Süreya (born in 1931), poet
- 31 January – Muammer Aksoy (born in 1917), academic (assassinated)
- 7 March – Çetin Emeç (born in 1935), journalist (assassinated)
- 20 August – Ayla Dikmen (born in 1944), singer
- 4 September – Turan Dursun (born in 1934), author, theologist (assassinated)
- 6 October – Bahriye Üçok (born 1919), academic, politician (assassinated)
- 3 November – Kenan Erim (born in 1929), archaeologist
- 11 November – Sadi Irmak (born in 1904), MD and prime minister (38th government of Turkey)
- 24 November – Bülent Arel (born in 1919), musician (electronic)

== Gallery ==
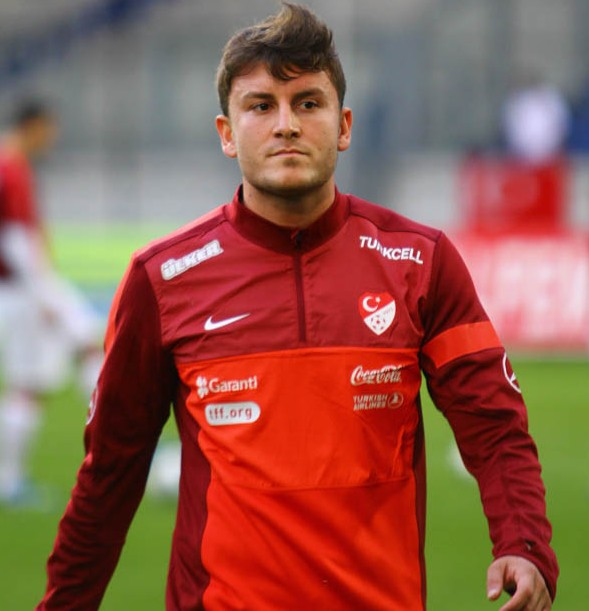
Sefa Yılmaz

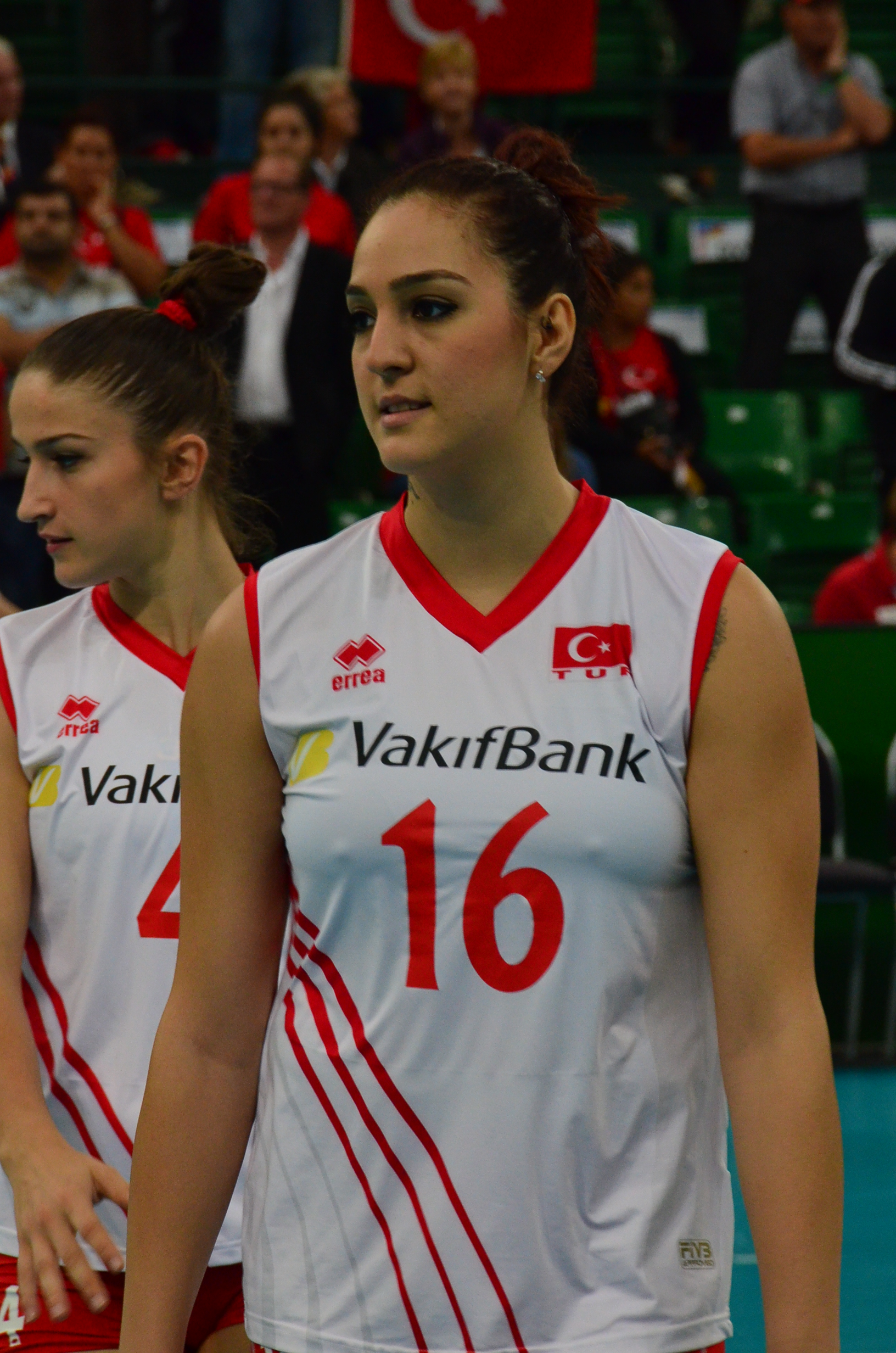
Büşra Cansu

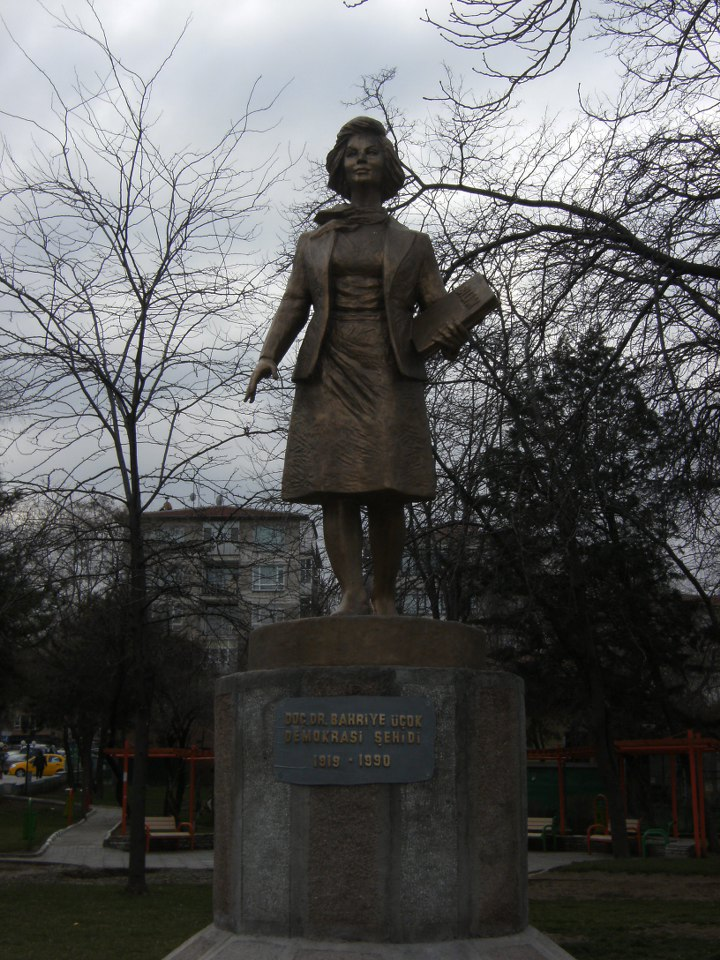
Statue of
Bahriye Üçok

== See also ==
- 1989–90 1.Lig
- Turkey in the Eurovision Song Contest 1990
