= 1986 in Turkey =

- Centuries: 20th; 21st
- Decades: 1960s; 1970s; 1980s; 1990s; 2000s
- See also: List of years in Turkey

Events in the year 1986 in Turkey.

== Parliament ==
- 17th Parliament of Turkey

== Incumbents ==
- President – Kenan Evren
- Prime Minister – Turgut Özal
- Leader of the opposition –

Aydın Güven Gürkan (up to 30 May)
Erdal İnönü (from 30 May)

== Ruling party and the main opposition ==
- Ruling party – Motherland Party (ANAP)
- Main opposition – Social Democratic Populist Party (SHP)

== Cabinet ==
- 45th government of Turkey

== Events ==
=== May ===
- 4 May – Nationalist Democracy Party (MDP) is dissolved.
- 9 May – Free Democratic Party founded.
- 16 May – True Path Party (DYP) forms parliamentary group.
- 16 May – Eyüp Can wins bronze at the 1986 World Amateur Boxing Championships in Reno, United States
- 30 May – Erdal Inönü elected chairman of Social Democratic Populist Party (SDPP).

=== June ===
- 1 June – Beşiktaş wins the championship

=== August ===
- 15 August – Turkey bombs separatist enclaves in Northern Iraq.

=== September ===
- 6 September – 22 die in the terror attack to the Neve Shalom Synagogue in Istanbul.

=== October ===
- 6 October – TRT 2, the second TV channel, starts airing.
- 24 October – Construction starts on Soviet natural gas pipeline.

=== November ===
- 12 November – Tanju Çolak wins European Golden Shoe.
- 30 November – Free Democratic Party dissolves.

=== December ===
- 26 December – People’s Party established.
- 29 December – People’s Party dissolves.

== Births ==
- 9 February – Azize Tanrıkulu, taekwondo athlete
- 16 February – Nevin Yanıt, sprinter
- 22 February – Işıl Alben, basketball player
- 23 February – Serhat Çetin, basketball player
- 3 March – Mehmet Topal, footballer
- 1 April - Özge Özpirinçci, actress
- 4 June – Tolgahan Acar, footballer
- 25 June – Seda Tokatlıoğlu, volleyball player
- 16 September – Resul Tekeli, basketball player

== Deaths ==
- 9 January – Nurullah Berk (born 1906), painter
- 10 January – Celal Yardımcı (born 1911), politician
- 7 May – Haldun Taner (born 1915), writer
- 28 May – Edip Cansever, (born 1928), poet
- 22 August – Celal Bayar (born 1883), former president

== Gallery ==
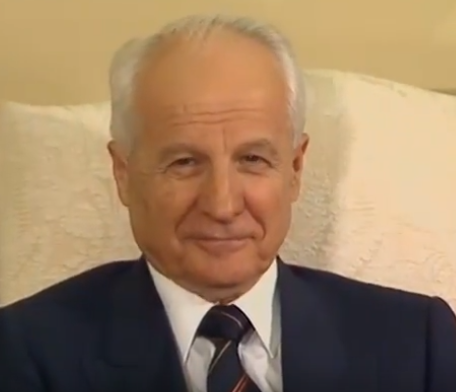
Kenan Evren

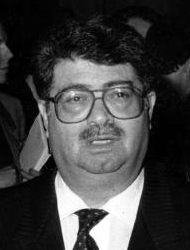
Turgut Özal

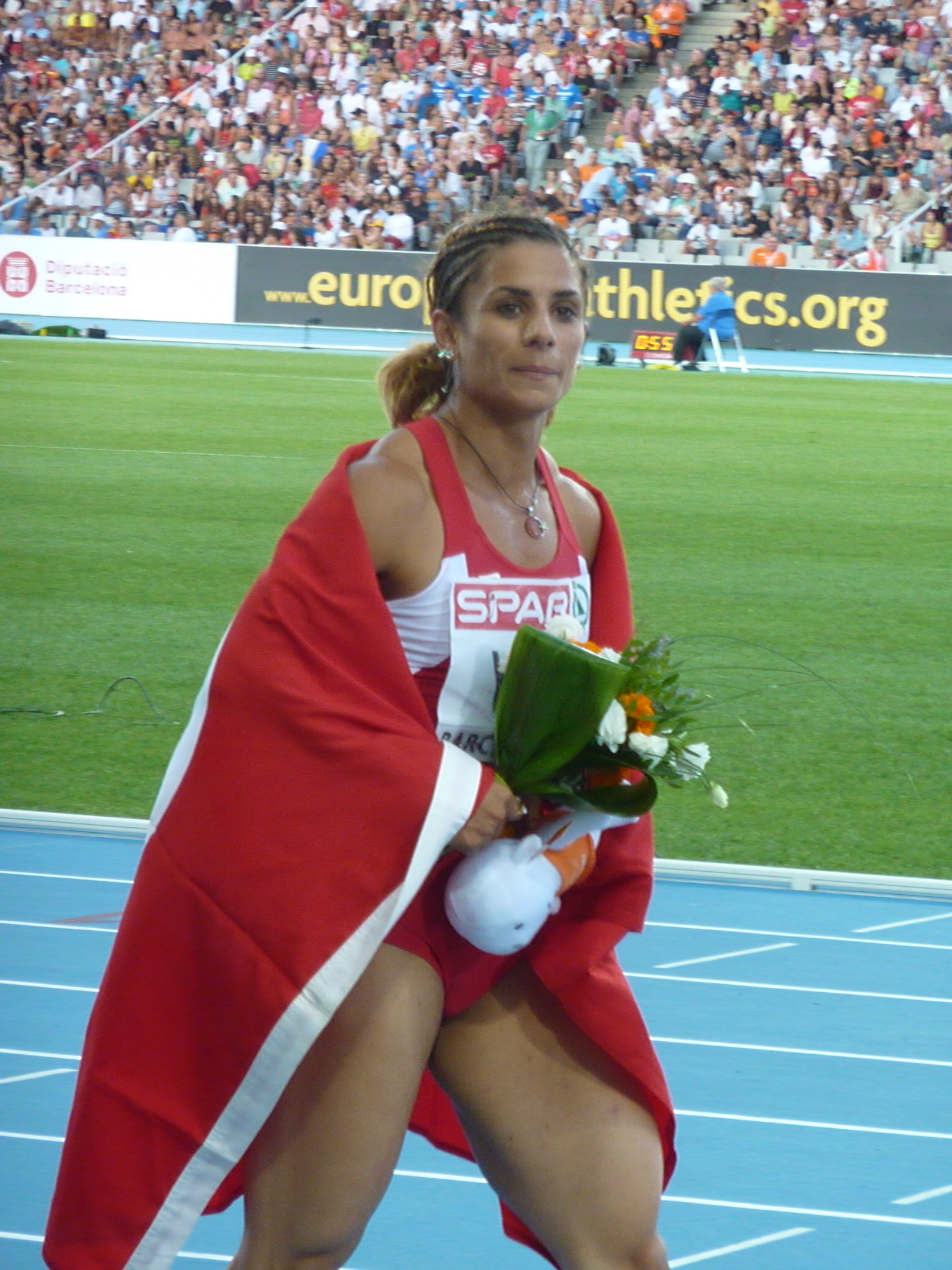
Nevin Yanıt

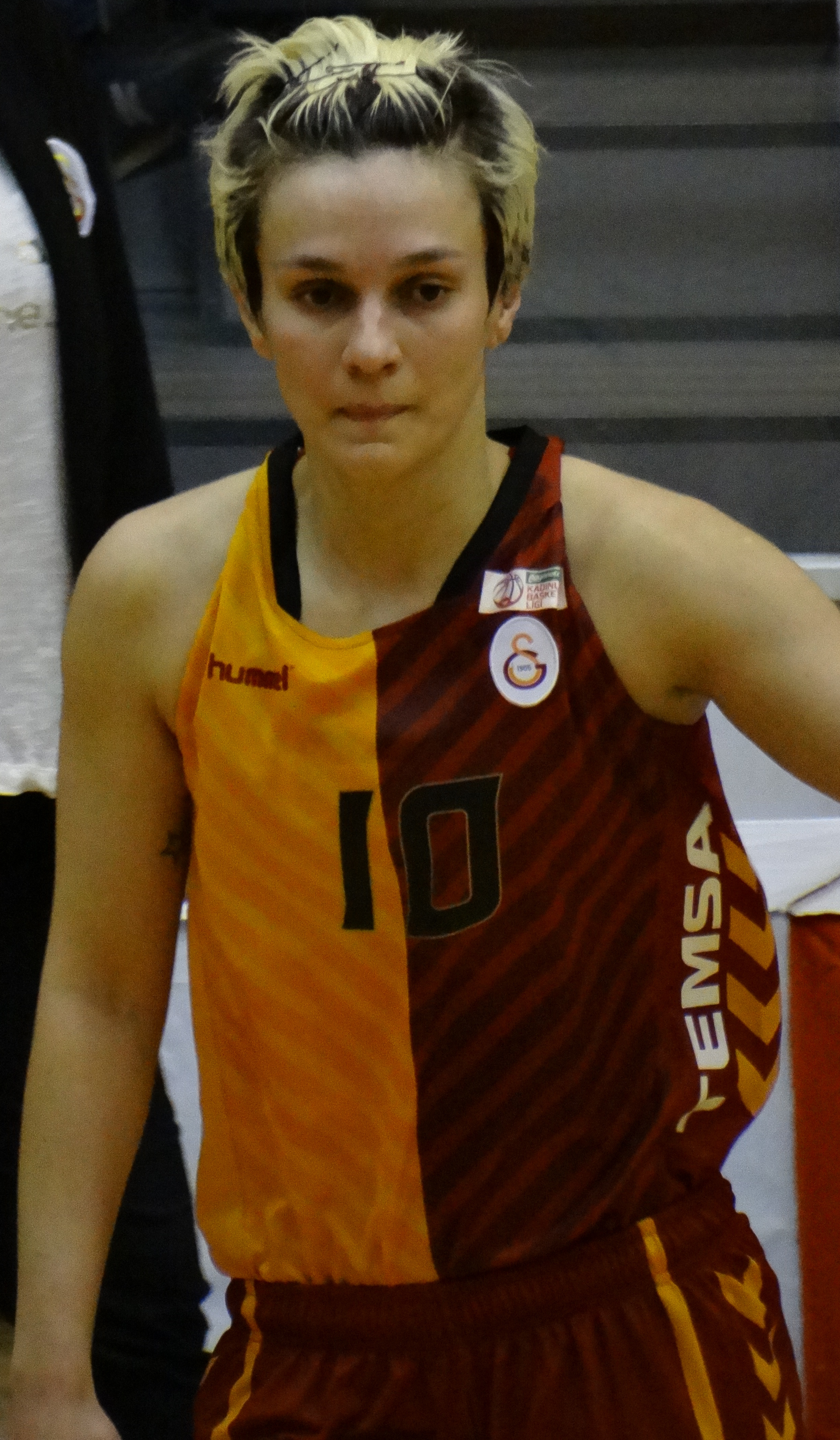
Işıl Alben

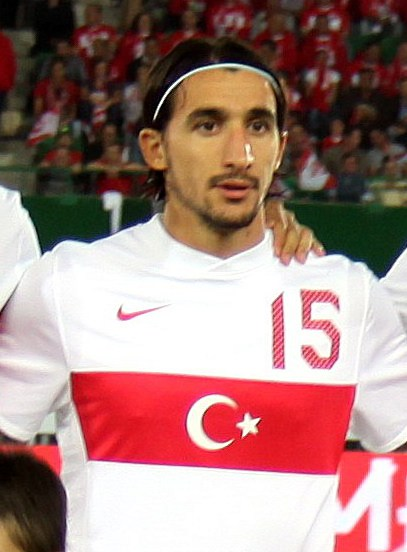
Mehmet Topal

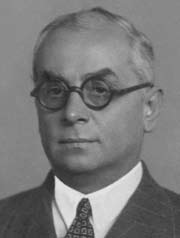
Celal Bayar

== See also ==
- Turkey in the Eurovision Song Contest 1986
- 1985–86 1.Lig
