= Didem Taş =

Turkish footballer (born 1992)

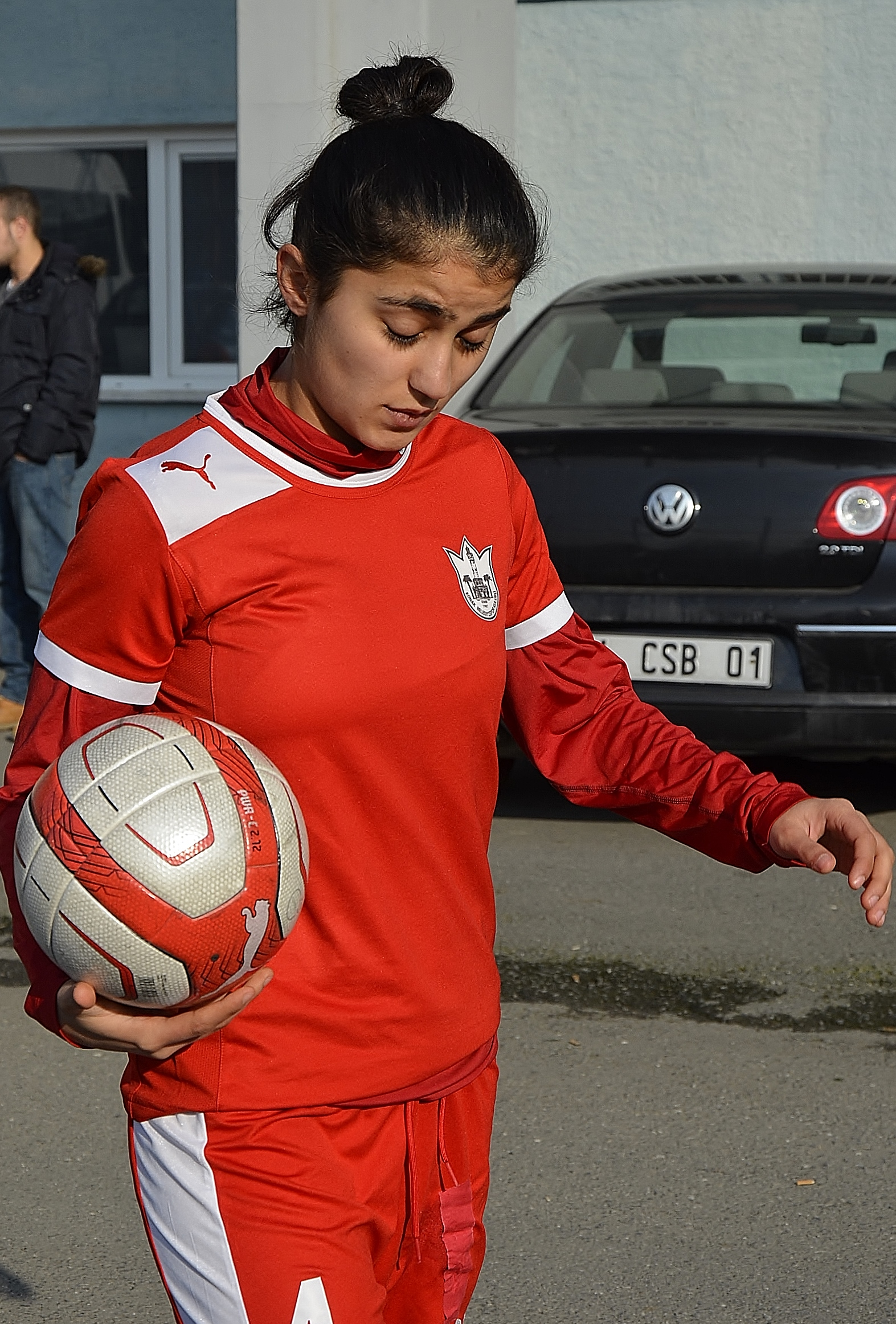
- Didem Taş for Konak Belediyespor (January 2014)

Personal information
- Date of birth: March 31, 1992 (age 34)
- Place of birth: Konak, İzmir, Turkey
- Position: Defender

Team information
- Current team: Konak Belediyespor
- Number: 4

Senior career*
Years	Team	Apps	(Gls)
2006–	Konak Belediyespor	196	(1)

International career^{‡}
2008	Turkey U-17	1	(0)
2009–2010	Turkey U-19	15	(0)
2013–2014	Turkey	3	(0)
- * Club domestic league appearances and goals as of 16 January 2022 ‡ National team caps and goals as of 13 February 2014

Didem Taş (born March 31, 1992) is a Turkish women's footballer who plays as a defender in the First League for Konak Belediyespor. She is a member of the Turkish national team since 2009.

== Career ==
=== Club ===
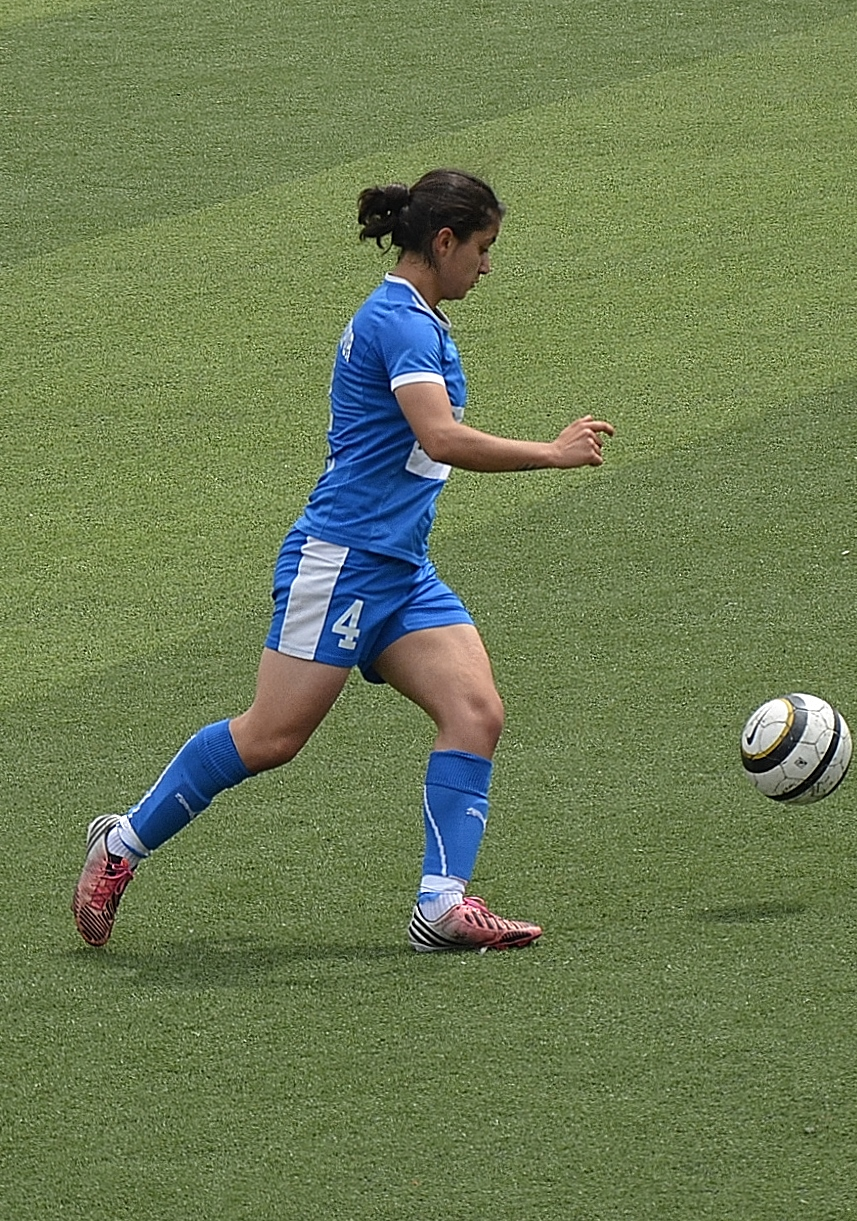
Didem Taş playing for Konak Belediyespor in the 2013–14 season

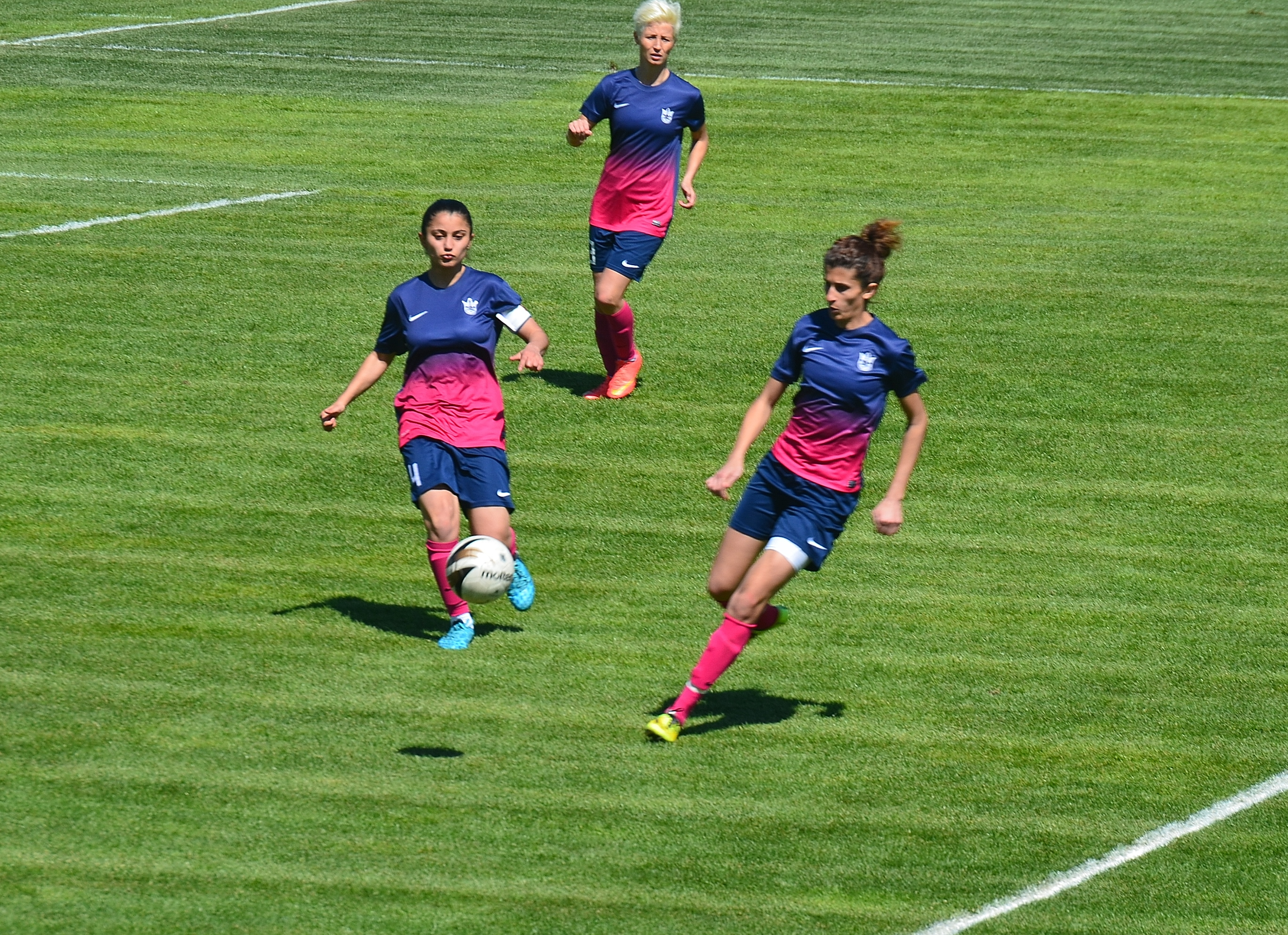
Didem Taş (left) playing for Konak Belediyespor in the 2014–15 season

Didem Taş obtained her license from her hometown club Konak Belediyespor on November 3, 2006. She plays since then in the same club, and is currently serves as their captain.

At the end of the 2012–13 season, she enjoyed Women's First League championship. Taş played at the 2013–14 UEFA Women's Champions League in the qualification round matches in August 2013 and in the knockout stage matches in October 2013. She appeared in three matches of the 2015–16 UEFA Women's Champions League qualifying round.

At the end of the 2015–16 season, she enjoyed once again her team's champion title. She played in three matches of the Group 9 of the 2016–17 UEFA Women's Champions League qualifying round. Taş took part in three matches of the 2017–18 UEFA Women's Champions League qualifying round in Tbilisi, Georgia.

=== International ===
Taş made her first appearance in the Turkey girls' U-17 national team in the 2009 UEFA Women's U-17 Championship qualifying round match against Ireland on October 18, 2008. Playing against the teams Netherlands and Faroe Islands at the same tournament, she capped three times in total.

She was called up for the women's U-19 national team to play at the 2010 UEFA Women's U-19 Championship First qualifying round – Group 7 matches, and made her debut against the Serbian women on September 19, 2009. Taş participated in the following group matches of the tournament against France and Georgia. She capped three times in the women's U-19 national team.

Didem Taş played for the first time in the women's national team in the Kuban Spring Tournament match against Ukraine on March 14, 2009. After participating in a number of tournament and friendly matches, she played also against England and Montenegro at the 2015 FIFA Women's World Cup qualification – UEFA Group 6 matches. As of end 2013, she capped 19 times in the national team.

== Career statistics ==
As of match played 16 Jasnuary 2022.

Club	Season	League			Continental		National		Total	
Club	Season	Division	Apps	Goals	Apps	Goals	Apps	Goals	Apps	Goals
Konak Belediyespor
Konak Belediyespor	2006–08	First League			–	–	0	0		
Konak Belediyespor	2008–09	First League	16	0	–	–	9	0	25	0
Konak Belediyespor	2009–10	First League	17	0	–	–	7	0	24	0
Konak Belediyespor	2010–11	First League	21	0	–	–	0	0	21	0
Konak Belediyespor	2011–12	First League	19	1	–	–	0	0	19	1
Konak Belediyespor	2012–13	First League	18	0	–	–	0	0	18	0
Konak Belediyespor	2013–14	First League	17	0	7	0	3	0	27	0
Konak Belediyespor	2014–15	First League	14	0	3	0	0	0	17	0
Konak Belediyespor	2015–16	First League	15	0	3	0	0	0	18	0
Konak Belediyespor	2016–17	First League	20	0	3	0	0	0	23	0
Konak Belediyespor	2017–18	First League	14	0	3	0	0	0	17	0
Konak Belediyespor	2018–19	First League	6	0	0	0	0	0	16	0
Konak Belediyespor	2019–20	First League	11	0	0	0	0	0	11	0
Konak Belediyespor	2020–221	First League	4	0	0	0	0	0	4	0
Konak Belediyespor	2021–22	Super League	4	0	0	0	0	0	4	0
Konak Belediyespor	Total		196	1	19	0	19	0	234	1
Career total			196	1	19	0	19	0	234	1

== Honours ==
Turkish Women's First League

Konak Belediyespor
Winners (5): 2012–13, 2013–14, 2014–15, 2015–16, 2016–17
Runners-up (2): 2010–11
Third place (3): 2009–10, 2017–18, 2018–19
