= Kızıldağ Pass =

Kızıldağ Pass is the highest-altitude pass in Turkey

The pass is on the main highway D.200 connecting East Anatolia to Central Anatolia at the borderline between the provinces Sivas and Erzincan. With the coordinates 39°51′36″N 38°25′40″E, the distance to Sivas is 140 kilometres (87 mi) and to Erzincan is 106 kilometres (66 mi). The elevation is 2,190 metres (7,190 ft). It is difficult to keep the pass open to traffic during the winters because of the harsh weather conditions due to high altitude.
