= Deniz Aslan =

Turkish footballer

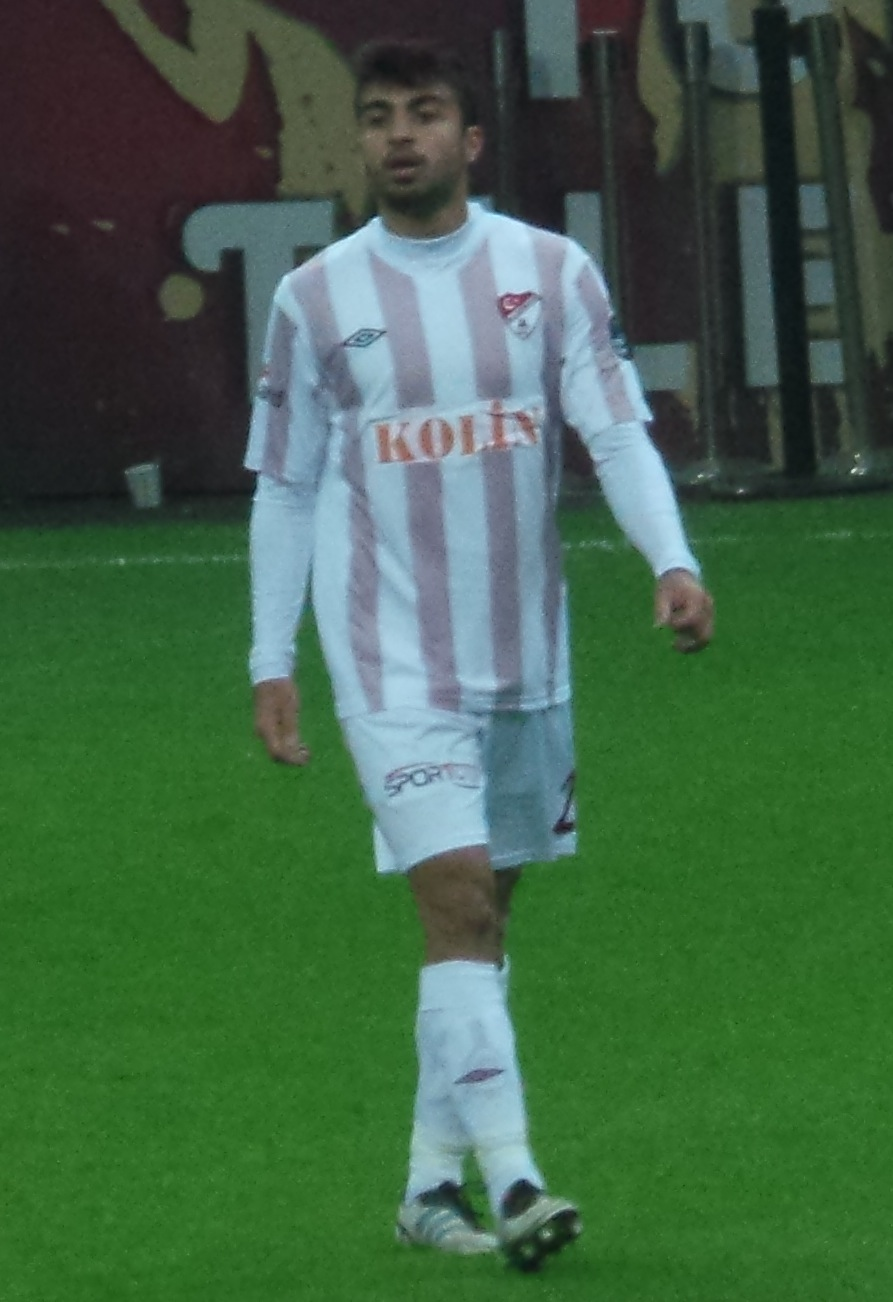

Personal information
- Full name: Deniz Aslan
- Date of birth: 9 February 1989 (age 37)
- Place of birth: Zaandam, Netherlands
- Position: Defender

Senior career*
Years	Team	Apps	(Gls)
2010–2011	Helmond Sport	9	(1)
2011–2012	Bursaspor	0	(0)
2012–2013	Antalyaspor	0	(0)
2013	→ Tavşanlı Linyitspor (loan)	12	(1)
2013–2014	Elazığspor	16	(0)
2014–2015	Boluspor	29	(0)
2015–2016	Karşıyaka	2	(0)
2016	Kartalspor	12	(1)
2016–2017	FC Emmen	18	(0)
- * Club domestic league appearances and goals as of 13 May 2017

Deniz Aslan (born 9 February 1989) is a Turkish footballer who last played as a defender for FC Emmen.
