= Didem Ege =

Turkish volleyball player (born 1988)

Personal information
- Born: 31 May 1988 (age 38); Istanbul, Turkey
- Height: 1.73 m (5 ft 8 in)

Volleyball information
- Position: Libero
- Current club: Fenerbahçe Universal

National team
Turkey

Didem Ege (born 31 May 1988) is a Turkish volleyball player. She is 173 cm tall and plays as libero. She plays for Turkish professional club Fenerbahçe Universal.

She started her professional career with Enka Spor where she played for 2 years, then transferred to Eczacıbaşı Vitra where she played for 5 years. Then she moved to the United States to study Psychology in Clemson University. After her university career, she moved back to Turkey and played for Nilufer Belediyesi in 2010–11 season.

== See also ==
- Turkish women in sports
