= List of ambassadors of Turkey to the United States =

Ambassador of Turkey to the United States

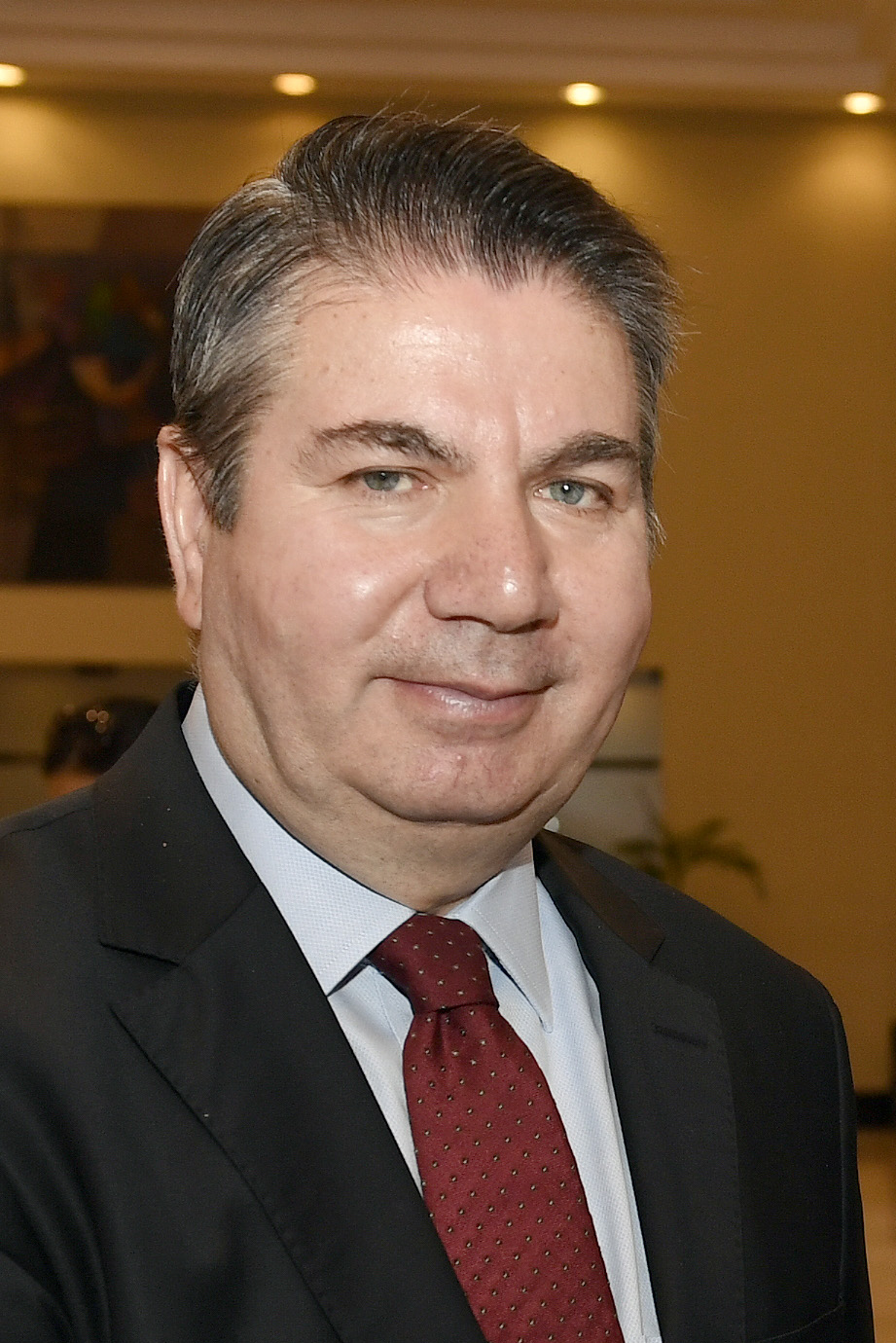
- Incumbent; Sedat Önal; Ambassador since 24 April 2024
- Turkish Ministry of Foreign Affairs; Embassy of Turkey, Washington D.C.
- Style: His or Her Excellency (formal); Mr. or Madam Ambassador (informal)
- Reports to: Minister of Foreign Affairs
- Seat: Washington D.C., United States
- Nominator: President
- Appointer: President
- Inaugural holder: Ahmet Muhtar Mollaoğlu
- Formation: 1927
- Website: Turkish Embassy - Washington D.C.

The Turkish Ambassador to the United States is the official representative of the President of Turkey and the Government of Turkey to the President of the United States and Federal government of the United States.

== List of ambassadors ==
Portrait	Name	Term start	Term end	Ref.
Ahmet Muhtar Bey Mollaoğlu (cropped)	Ahmet Muhtar Mollaoğlu	28 November 1927	20 April 1934	
Münir Ertegün (cropped)	Mehmet Münir Ertegün	18 June 1934	1 November 1944	
	Orhan Halit Erol	1 November 1944	16 March 1945	
	Hüseyin Ragıp Baydur	16 March 1945	27 August 1948	
Bundesarchiv B 145 Bild-F017259-0001, Bonn, Empfang für Außenminister der Türkei erkin (cropped)	Feridun Cemal Erkin	11 August 1948	15 June 1955	
	Ali Haydar Görk	31 May 1955	19 April 1957	
Suat Ürgüplü (cropped twice)	Suat Hayri Ürgüplü	27 August 1957	23 March 1960	
	Melih Esenbel	24 March 1960	28 October 1960	
	Bülend Uşaklıgil	1 November 1960	20 June 1962	
	Turgut Menemencioğlu	24 April 1962	2 January 1967	
	Melih Esenbel	9 January 1967	1 November 1974	
	Aydın Yeğen	1 November 1974	1 April 1975	
	Melih Esenbel	1 April 1975	14 July 1979	
	Şükrü Elekdağ	23 July 1979	26 June 1989	
	Nüzhet Kandemir	14 August 1989	15 April 1998	
	Baki İlkin	17 April 1998	18 September 2001	
	Faruk Loğoğlu	24 September 2001	26 December 2005	
Nabi Şensoy 070126-D-9880W-036 (cropped)	Nabi Şensoy	1 January 2006	17 January 2010	
Namık Tan (cropped) (cropped)	Namık Tan	15 February 2010	31 March 2014	
Serdar Kılıç (cropped) (cropped)	Serdar Kılıç	17 April 2014	2 March 2021	
	Hasan Murat Mercan	15 March 2021	12 January 2024	
Hasan Murat Mercan (cropped)	Sedat Önal	24 April 2024	Present	

== See also ==
- Turkey–United States relations
- Embassy of Turkey, Washington D.C.
- Ambassadors of the United States to Turkey
