= Ministry of Foreign Affairs (Turkey) =

Government ministry of Turkey

Ministry of Foreign Affairs of the Republic of Turkey
- Türkiye Cumhuriyeti Dışişleri Bakanlığı

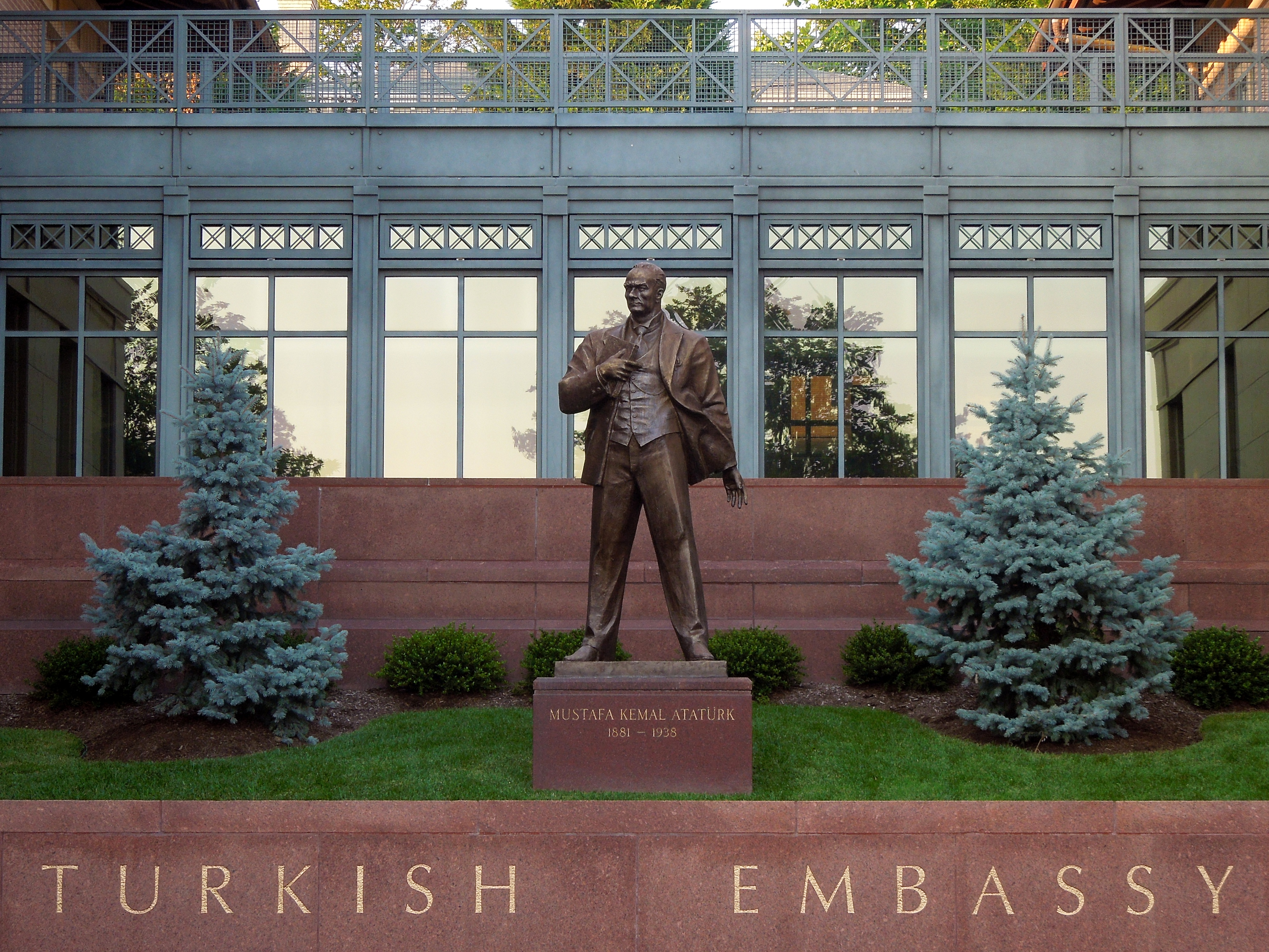
- Statue of Atatürk, founding father of Turkey, in front of the Turkish embassy in Washington D.C.

Agency overview
- Formed: 2 May 1920; 106 years ago
- Jurisdiction: Government of Turkey
- Headquarters: Dr. Sadık Ahmet Cad. Balgat, Ankara
- Annual budget: ₺31.373.647.000 (2024)
- Minister responsible: Hakan Fidan
- Deputy Ministers responsible: Berris Ekinci; Burhanettin Duran; Mehmet Kemal Bozay; Nuh Yılmaz
- Website: www.mfa.gov.tr

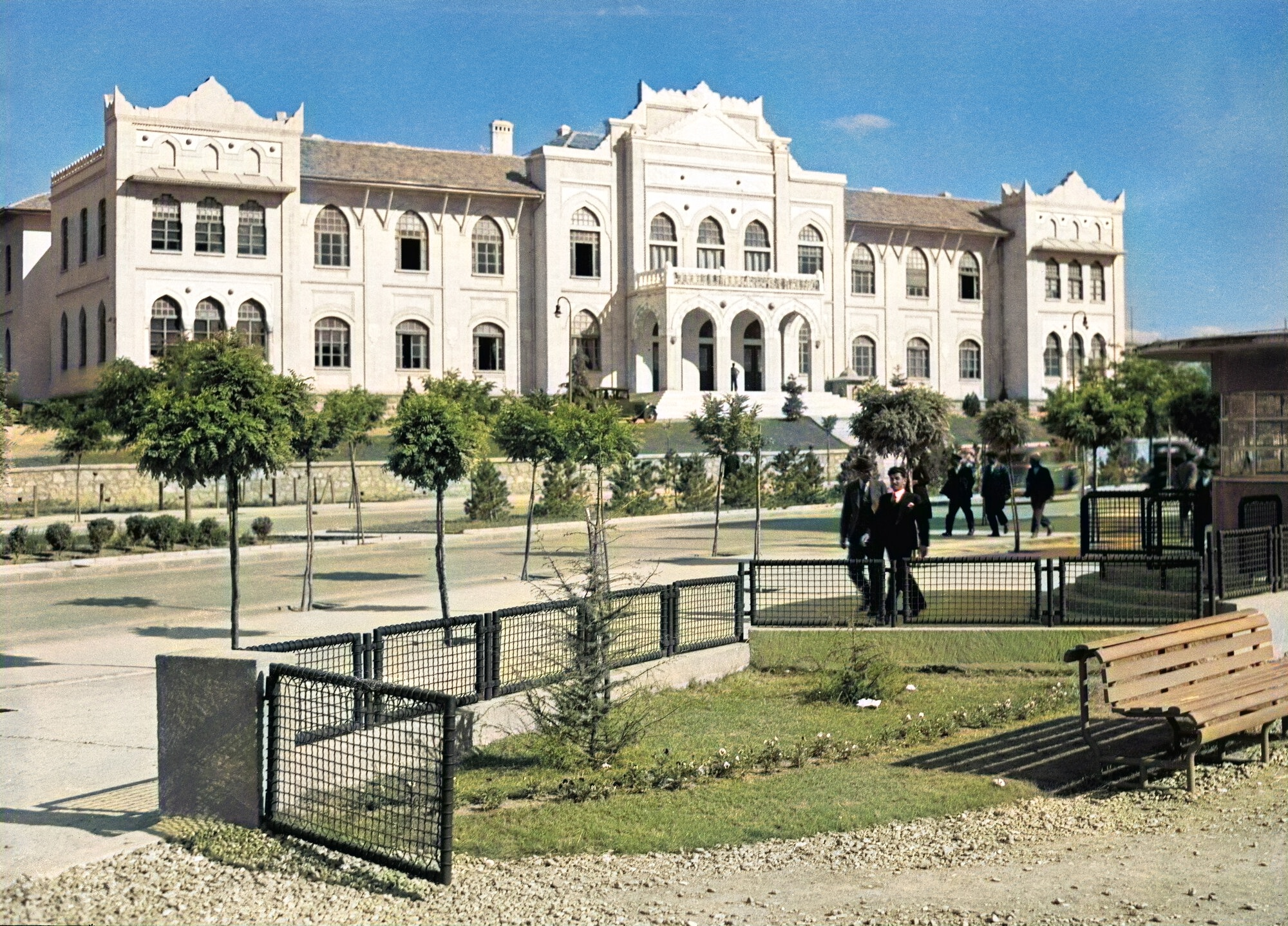
Former building of the Ministry of Foreign Affairs, c. 1930s

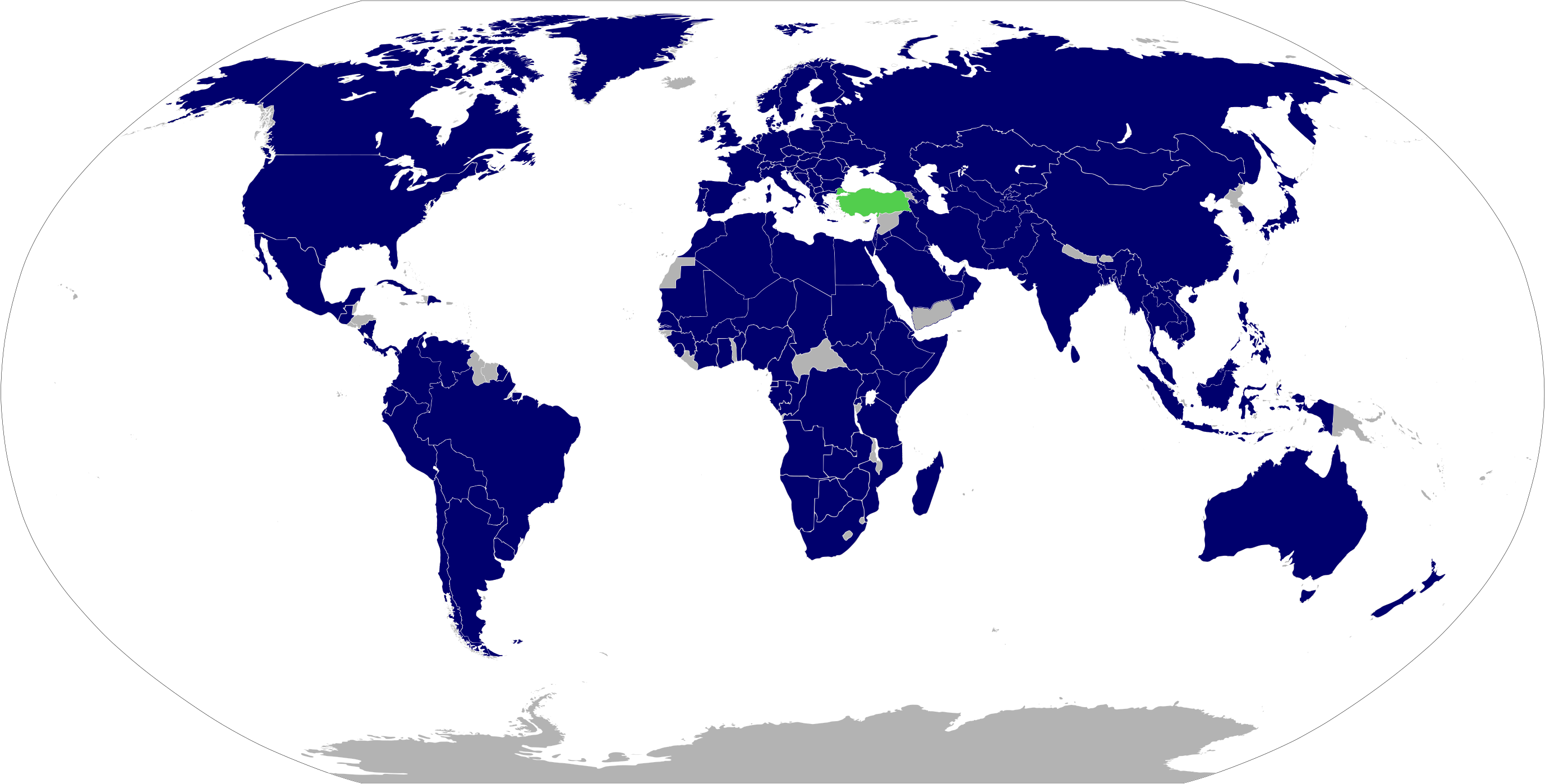
Map of countries with Turkish diplomatic missions

The Ministry of Foreign Affairs (Turkish: Dışişleri Bakanlığı) is the governmental body responsible for conducting foreign relations of the Republic of Turkey. The Ministry is responsible for Turkey's diplomatic missions abroad as well as providing support for Turkish citizens and promoting Turkish culture. The ministry implements Turkish foreign policy in accordance with the country's national interests. Established on 2 May 1920, its primary duties are administering diplomatic missions, negotiating international treaties and agreements, and representing the Republic of Turkey at the United Nations.

The ministry is headquartered in the Turkish capital of Ankara and counts on more than 200 missions as embassies, permanent representation offices and consulates general, abroad. As of 2021, the Ministry of Foreign Affairs maintains 235 diplomatic posts worldwide.

The current Minister of Foreign Affairs is Hakan Fidan, who has held the position since 3 June 2023.

== Diplomatic missions ==
The Ministry oversees Turkey's diplomatic missions abroad, which include embassies, consulates, and representative offices in over 200 countries and territories.

== Gender equality ==
As of April 2023, 42% of Turkey's ambassadors and 15% of Turkey's consuls-general are women. That is, 72 women out of 172 ambassadors, and 14 women out of 97 consuls-general. (Note: Ambassador-level missions overseas are made up of 13 permanent delegates, a trade representative, and 159 embassies; totaling to 172 ambassadors. This statistic excludes Turkey's domestic ambassador-level posts, such as general directors or political advisers.)

== Organization ==
=== Office of the Minister ===
This is the top-level of the MFA hierarchy and is responsible for managing the overall operations of the ministry. The Minister of Foreign Affairs is assisted by three Deputy Ministers and several advisors.

=== Central organization ===
- Political Affairs department is responsible for the development and implementation of Turkey's foreign policy. It analyzes international political developments, conducts research, and provides policy recommendations to the government.
- Economic Affairs department is responsible for promoting Turkey's economic interests abroad. It works to increase trade and investment, improve economic relations with other countries, and support Turkish businesses operating abroad.
- EU Affairs department is responsible for Turkey's relations with the European Union (EU). It coordinates Turkey's accession negotiations with the EU and monitors EU policies that affect Turkey's interests.
- Multilateral Political Affairs department is responsible for Turkey's participation in international organizations such as the United Nations, the Organization for Security and Cooperation in Europe, and the Organization of Islamic Cooperation.
- Consular Affairs department provides consular services to Turkish citizens abroad and foreign nationals in Turkey. It issues passports and visas, provides assistance to Turkish nationals in emergency situations, and works to protect the rights of Turkish citizens abroad.
- Cultural Affairs department is responsible for promoting Turkish culture and language abroad. It organizes cultural events, supports Turkish language instruction in foreign countries, and facilitates academic and cultural exchanges between Turkey and other countries.
- Protocol department is responsible for managing official visits by foreign dignitaries and organizing events hosted by the MFA. It also provides logistical support to Turkish diplomatic missions abroad.
- Overseas Promotion and Public Diplomacy department is responsible for promoting Turkey's image abroad and improving its relations with foreign publics. It conducts public diplomacy activities, manages Turkish cultural centers abroad, and coordinates public relations efforts with Turkish diplomatic missions.

=== Field offices ===
The ministry runs field offices in the following cities:

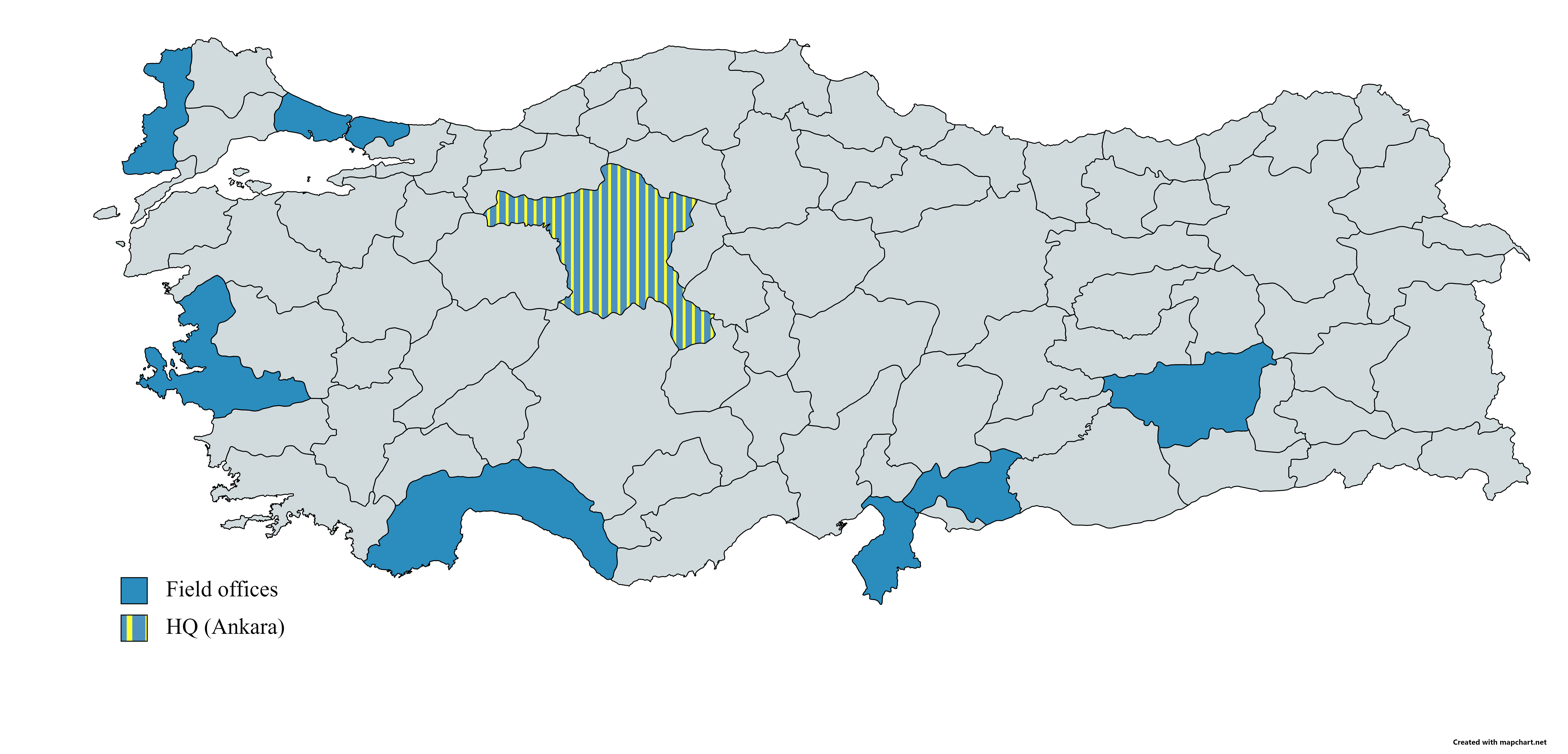

=== Overseas organization ===
Turkish embassies, consulates-general, permanent representatives, and trade offices are semi-detached from the central organization. They follow the orders of the Minister's office, and the chief of mission is the sole authority within an overseas diplomatic mission. In the Turkish MFA, an ambassador is the chief of an embassy or a permanent representative. An ambassador would also be the chief of the sole Turkish trade office abroad in the Republic of China (Taiwan). Consulates-general are headed by diplomats called consuls-general.

== Major issues ==
Main Issues
Cyprus
Turkey and the EU
Turkey's Security (NATO)
Terrorism
Controversy between Turkey and Armenia about the Events of 1915
Turkey's International Energy Strategy
Water Issues
Environment Policy
The Turkish Straits
Resolution of Conflicts and Mediation
Arms Control and Disarmament
Turkish Citizens Living Abroad
Turkey's Multilateral Transportation Policy
Human Rights
Turkey on Irregular Migration
Turkey on Trafficking in Human Beings
Combating Drugs
Combating Organized Crime
Combating Corruption
Turkey's Humanitarian Assistance
Internally Displaced People (IDPs) in Turkey
Maritime Issues
The Alliance of Civilizations Initiative
Asia Anew Initiative

== International organizations ==
Republic of Turkey is a member of 26 international organizations. The contact between these organizations and Turkey is maintained by the Ministry of Foreign Affairs.

List of international organizations
Name of the international organization	Status of Republic of Turkey
Asia Cooperation Dialogue	Member
African Union	Observer Member
Black Sea Naval Force	Member
Community of Latin American and Caribbean States	Non-member, quartet meetings on UN General Assembly
Conference on Interaction and Confidence-Building Measures in Asia	Member
Organization of the Black Sea Economic Cooperation	Founding Member
Council of Europe	Member
D-8 Organization for Economic Cooperation	Member
Economic Cooperation Organization	Member
International Criminal Court	Non-member, annual meetings attended by Turkish officials
Arab League	Non-member, diplomatic relations between Arab League and Turkey
MIKTA	Member
NATO	Member
Organisation of Islamic Cooperation	Member
Organization for Security and Co-operation in Europe	Signatory
Organisation for Economic Co-operation and Development	Member
Union for the Mediterranean	Member
United Nations	Member
United Nations Department of Peace Operations	Member
Comprehensive Nuclear-Test-Ban Treaty Organization	Member
Organization of Turkic States	Member
International Organization of Turkic Culture	Member
International Center for Agricultural Research in the Dry Areas	Member
Organization of American States	
OPEC	

== List of foreign ministers ==
The position of Minister of Foreign Affairs of Turkey was established in 1920, during the Turkish War of Independence.

No.	Portrait	Name	Term of office			Political party
No.	Portrait	Name	Took office	Left office	Term	Political party
1		Bekir Sami Kunduh (1867–1933)	3 May 1920	8 May 1921	1 year, 5 days	Independent
2		Ahmet Muhtar Mollaoğlu (1870–1934)	8 May 1921	16 May 1921	8 days	Independent
3		Yusuf Kemal Tengirşenk (1878–1969)	16 May 1921	25 October 1922	1 year, 162 days	Independent
4		İsmet İnönü (1884–1973)	25 October 1922	22 November 1924	2 years, 28 days	Republican People's Party
5		Şükrü Kaya (1883–1959)	22 November 1924	3 March 1925	101 days	Republican People's Party
6		Tevfik Rüştü Aras (1883–1972)	3 March 1925	11 November 1938	13 years, 253 days	Republican People's Party
7		Şükrü Saracoğlu (1887–1953)	11 November 1938	14 August 1942	3 years, 276 days	Republican People's Party
8		Numan Menemencioğlu (1893–1958)	14 August 1942	16 June 1944	1 year, 307 days	Republican People's Party
(7)		Şükrü Saracoğlu (1887–1953)	16 June 1944	13 September 1944	89 days	Republican People's Party
9		Hasan Saka (1885–1960)	13 September 1944	10 September 1947	2 years, 362 days	Republican People's Party
10		Necmettin Sadak (1890–1953)	10 September 1947	22 May 1950	2 years, 254 days	Republican People's Party
11		Mehmet Fuat Köprülü (1890–1966)	22 May 1950	15 April 1955	4 years, 328 days	Democrat Party
12		Adnan Menderes (1899–1961)	15 April 1955	27 July 1955	103 days	Democrat Party
—		Fatin Rüştü Zorlu (1910–1961); Acting Minister	27 July 1955	9 December 1955	135 days	Democrat Party
(11)		Mehmet Fuat Köprülü (1890–1966)	9 December 1955	20 June 1956	194 days	Democrat Party
—		Ethem Menderes (1899–1992); Acting Minister	20 June 1956	25 November 1957	1 year, 158 days	Democrat Party
13		Fatin Rüştü Zorlu (1910–1961)	25 November 1957	27 May 1960	2 years, 184 days	Democrat Party
14		Selim Sarper (1899–1968)	30 May 1960	26 March 1962	1 year, 300 days	Independent
15		Feridun Cemal Erkin (1899–1980)	26 March 1962	20 February 1965	2 years, 331 days	Justice Party
16		Hasan Esat Işık (1916–1989)	20 February 1965	27 October 1965	249 days	Independent
17		İhsan Sabri Çağlayangil (1908–1993)	27 October 1965	26 March 1971	5 years, 150 days	Justice Party
18		Osman Esim Olcay (1924–2010)	26 March 1971	11 December 1971	260 days	Independent
19		Ümit Haluk Bayülken (1921–2007)	11 December 1971	26 January 1974	2 years, 46 days	Independent
20		Turan Güneş (1922–1982)	26 January 1974	17 November 1974	295 days	Republican People's Party
21		Melih Esenbel (1915–1995)	17 November 1974	31 March 1975	134 days	Independent
(17)		İhsan Sabri Çağlayangil (1908–1993)	31 March 1975	21 June 1977	2 years, 82 days	Justice Party
22		Ahmet Gündüz Ökçün (1935–1986)	21 June 1977	21 July 1977	30 days	Republican People's Party
(17)		İhsan Sabri Çağlayangil (1908–1993)	21 July 1977	5 January 1978	168 days	Justice Party
(22)		Ahmet Gündüz Ökçün (1935–1986)	5 January 1978	12 November 1979	1 year, 311 days	Republican People's Party
23		Hayrettin Erkmen (1915–1999)	12 November 1979	5 September 1980	298 days	Justice Party
—		Ertuğrul Ekrem Ceyhun (1927–2017); Acting Minister	5 September 1980	12 September 1980	7 days	Justice Party
24		İlter Türkmen (1927–2022)	20 September 1980	13 December 1983	3 years, 84 days	Independent
25		Vahit Melih Halefoğlu (1919–2017)	13 December 1983	21 December 1987	4 years, 8 days	Motherland Party
26		Mesut Yılmaz (1947–2020)	21 December 1987	21 February 1990	2 years, 62 days	Motherland Party
27		Ali Bozer (1925–2020)	21 February 1990	12 October 1990	233 days	Motherland Party
28		Ahmet Kurtcebe Alptemoçin (born 1940)	13 October 1990	23 June 1991	253 days	Motherland Party
29		Safa Giray (1931–2011)	23 June 1991	20 November 1991	150 days	Motherland Party
30		Hikmet Çetin (born 1937)	21 November 1991	27 July 1994	2 years, 248 days	Social Democratic People's Party
31		Mümtaz Soysal (1929–2019)	27 July 1994	28 November 1994	124 days	Social Democratic People's Party
32		Murat Karayalçın (born 1943)	12 December 1994	27 March 1995	105 days	Social Democratic People's Party
33		Erdal İnönü (1926–2007)	27 March 1995	5 October 1995	192 days	Republican People's Party
34		Coşkun Kırca (1927–2005)	5 October 1995	30 October 1995	25 days	True Path Party
35		Deniz Baykal (1938–2023)	30 October 1995	6 March 1996	128 days	Republican People's Party
36		Emre Gönensay (born 1937)	6 March 1996	28 June 1996	114 days	True Path Party
37		Tansu Çiller (born 1946)	28 June 1996	30 June 1997	1 year, 2 days	True Path Party
38		İsmail Cem (1940–2007)	30 June 1997	12 July 2002	5 years, 12 days	Democratic Left Party
39		Şükrü Sina Gürel (born 1950)	12 July 2002	18 November 2002	129 days	Democratic Left Party
40		Yaşar Yakış (1938–2024)	18 November 2002	14 March 2003	116 days	Justice and Development Party
41		Abdullah Gül (born 1950)	14 March 2003	29 August 2007	4 years, 168 days	Justice and Development Party
42		Ali Babacan (born 1967)	29 August 2007	1 May 2009	1 year, 245 days	Justice and Development Party
43		Ahmet Davutoğlu (born 1959)	1 May 2009	29 August 2014	5 years, 120 days	Justice and Development Party
44		Mevlüt Çavuşoğlu (born 1968)	29 August 2014	28 August 2015	364 days	Justice and Development Party
45		Feridun Sinirlioğlu (born 1956)	28 August 2015	24 November 2015	88 days	Independent
(44)		Mevlüt Çavuşoğlu (born 1968)	24 November 2015	4 June 2023	7 years, 192 days	Justice and Development Party
46		Hakan Fidan (born 1968)	4 June 2023	Incumbent	3 years, 65 days	Justice and Development Party

== Awards ==
Since 1989, the Ministry awards people and organizations that have demonstrated distinguished services.

== See also ==
- List of ministers of foreign affairs of Turkey
- List of diplomatic missions of Turkey
- Foreign relations of Turkey
- Politics of Turkey
- Ministry of Foreign Affairs (Ottoman Empire)
