= List of ministers of foreign affairs of Turkey =

Minister of Foreign Affairs of Turkey
- Dışişleri Bakanı
- Emblem of Ministry of Foreign Affairs

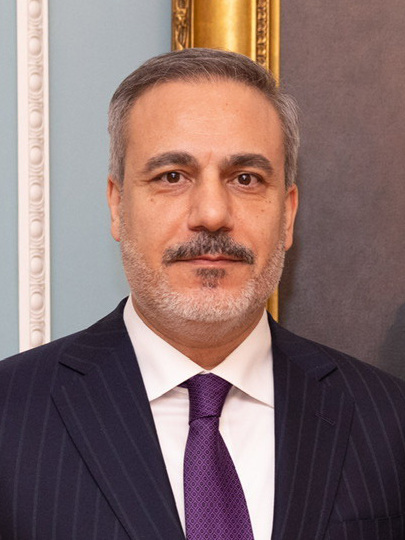
- Incumbent; Hakan Fidan since 4 June 2023
- Ministry of Foreign Affairs
- Member of: Cabinet; National Security Council; Supreme Military Council
- Reports to: President
- Residence: Residence of the Minister of Foreign Affairs
- Appointer: President
- Term length: No term limit
- Inaugural holder: Bekir Sami Kunduh
- Formation: 3 May 1920
- Deputy: Deputy Minister
- Website: www.mfa.gov.tr

This is a list of ministers of foreign affairs of Turkey.

== List ==
The position of Minister of Foreign Affairs of Turkey was established in 1920, during the Turkish War of Independence.

No.	Portrait	Name	Term of office			Political party
No.	Portrait	Name	Took office	Left office	Term	Political party
1		Bekir Sami Kunduh (1867–1933)	3 May 1920	8 May 1921	1 year, 5 days	Independent
2		Ahmet Muhtar Mollaoğlu (1870–1934)	8 May 1921	16 May 1921	8 days	Independent
3		Yusuf Kemal Tengirşenk (1878–1969)	16 May 1921	25 October 1922	1 year, 162 days	Independent
4		İsmet İnönü (1884–1973)	25 October 1922	22 November 1924	2 years, 28 days	Republican People's Party
5		Şükrü Kaya (1883–1959)	22 November 1924	3 March 1925	101 days	Republican People's Party
6		Tevfik Rüştü Aras (1883–1972)	3 March 1925	11 November 1938	13 years, 253 days	Republican People's Party
7		Şükrü Saracoğlu (1887–1953)	11 November 1938	14 August 1942	3 years, 276 days	Republican People's Party
8		Numan Menemencioğlu (1893–1958)	14 August 1942	16 June 1944	1 year, 307 days	Republican People's Party
(7)		Şükrü Saracoğlu (1887–1953)	16 June 1944	13 September 1944	89 days	Republican People's Party
9		Hasan Saka (1885–1960)	13 September 1944	10 September 1947	2 years, 362 days	Republican People's Party
10		Necmettin Sadak (1890–1953)	10 September 1947	22 May 1950	2 years, 254 days	Republican People's Party
11		Mehmet Fuat Köprülü (1890–1966)	22 May 1950	15 April 1955	4 years, 328 days	Democrat Party
12		Adnan Menderes (1899–1961)	15 April 1955	27 July 1955	103 days	Democrat Party
—		Fatin Rüştü Zorlu (1910–1961); Acting Minister	27 July 1955	9 December 1955	135 days	Democrat Party
(11)		Mehmet Fuat Köprülü (1890–1966)	9 December 1955	20 June 1956	194 days	Democrat Party
—		Ethem Menderes (1899–1992); Acting Minister	20 June 1956	25 November 1957	1 year, 158 days	Democrat Party
13		Fatin Rüştü Zorlu (1910–1961)	25 November 1957	27 May 1960	2 years, 184 days	Democrat Party
14		Selim Sarper (1899–1968)	30 May 1960	26 March 1962	1 year, 300 days	Independent
15		Feridun Cemal Erkin (1899–1980)	26 March 1962	20 February 1965	2 years, 331 days	Justice Party
16		Hasan Esat Işık (1916–1989)	20 February 1965	27 October 1965	249 days	Independent
17		İhsan Sabri Çağlayangil (1908–1993)	27 October 1965	26 March 1971	5 years, 150 days	Justice Party
18		Osman Esim Olcay (1924–2010)	26 March 1971	11 December 1971	260 days	Independent
19		Ümit Haluk Bayülken (1921–2007)	11 December 1971	26 January 1974	2 years, 46 days	Independent
20		Turan Güneş (1922–1982)	26 January 1974	17 November 1974	295 days	Republican People's Party
21		Melih Esenbel (1915–1995)	17 November 1974	31 March 1975	134 days	Independent
(17)		İhsan Sabri Çağlayangil (1908–1993)	31 March 1975	21 June 1977	2 years, 82 days	Justice Party
22		Ahmet Gündüz Ökçün (1935–1986)	21 June 1977	21 July 1977	30 days	Republican People's Party
(17)		İhsan Sabri Çağlayangil (1908–1993)	21 July 1977	5 January 1978	168 days	Justice Party
(22)		Ahmet Gündüz Ökçün (1935–1986)	5 January 1978	12 November 1979	1 year, 311 days	Republican People's Party
23		Hayrettin Erkmen (1915–1999)	12 November 1979	5 September 1980	298 days	Justice Party
—		Ertuğrul Ekrem Ceyhun (1927–2017); Acting Minister	5 September 1980	12 September 1980	7 days	Justice Party
24		İlter Türkmen (1927–2022)	20 September 1980	13 December 1983	3 years, 84 days	Independent
25		Vahit Melih Halefoğlu (1919–2017)	13 December 1983	21 December 1987	4 years, 8 days	Motherland Party
26		Mesut Yılmaz (1947–2020)	21 December 1987	21 February 1990	2 years, 62 days	Motherland Party
27		Ali Bozer (1925–2020)	21 February 1990	12 October 1990	233 days	Motherland Party
28		Ahmet Kurtcebe Alptemoçin (born 1940)	13 October 1990	23 June 1991	253 days	Motherland Party
29		Safa Giray (1931–2011)	23 June 1991	20 November 1991	150 days	Motherland Party
30		Hikmet Çetin (born 1937)	21 November 1991	27 July 1994	2 years, 248 days	Social Democratic People's Party
31		Mümtaz Soysal (1929–2019)	27 July 1994	28 November 1994	124 days	Social Democratic People's Party
32		Murat Karayalçın (born 1943)	12 December 1994	27 March 1995	105 days	Social Democratic People's Party
33		Erdal İnönü (1926–2007)	27 March 1995	5 October 1995	192 days	Republican People's Party
34		Coşkun Kırca (1927–2005)	5 October 1995	30 October 1995	25 days	True Path Party
35		Deniz Baykal (1938–2023)	30 October 1995	6 March 1996	128 days	Republican People's Party
36		Emre Gönensay (born 1937)	6 March 1996	28 June 1996	114 days	True Path Party
37		Tansu Çiller (born 1946)	28 June 1996	30 June 1997	1 year, 2 days	True Path Party
38		İsmail Cem (1940–2007)	30 June 1997	12 July 2002	5 years, 12 days	Democratic Left Party
39		Şükrü Sina Gürel (born 1950)	12 July 2002	18 November 2002	129 days	Democratic Left Party
40		Yaşar Yakış (1938–2024)	18 November 2002	14 March 2003	116 days	Justice and Development Party
41		Abdullah Gül (born 1950)	14 March 2003	29 August 2007	4 years, 168 days	Justice and Development Party
42		Ali Babacan (born 1967)	29 August 2007	1 May 2009	1 year, 245 days	Justice and Development Party
43		Ahmet Davutoğlu (born 1959)	1 May 2009	29 August 2014	5 years, 120 days	Justice and Development Party
44		Mevlüt Çavuşoğlu (born 1968)	29 August 2014	28 August 2015	364 days	Justice and Development Party
45		Feridun Sinirlioğlu (born 1956)	28 August 2015	24 November 2015	88 days	Independent
(44)		Mevlüt Çavuşoğlu (born 1968)	24 November 2015	4 June 2023	7 years, 192 days	Justice and Development Party
46		Hakan Fidan (born 1968)	4 June 2023	Incumbent	3 years, 95 days	Justice and Development Party

== List of ministers of foreign affairs by time in office ==
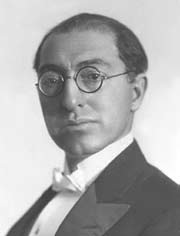
13 years, 253 days Tevfik Rüştü Aras from 1925 to 1938

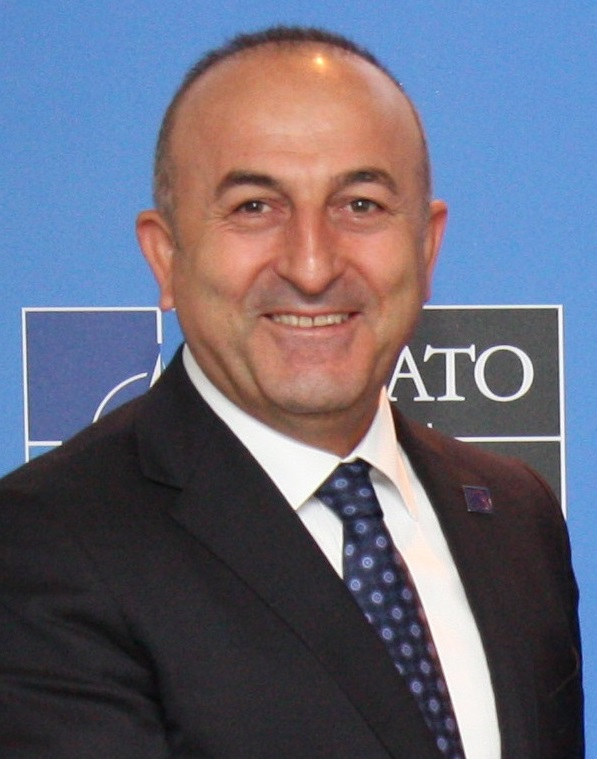
8 years, 192 days Mevlüt Çavuşoğlu from 2014 to 2015, from 2015 to 2023

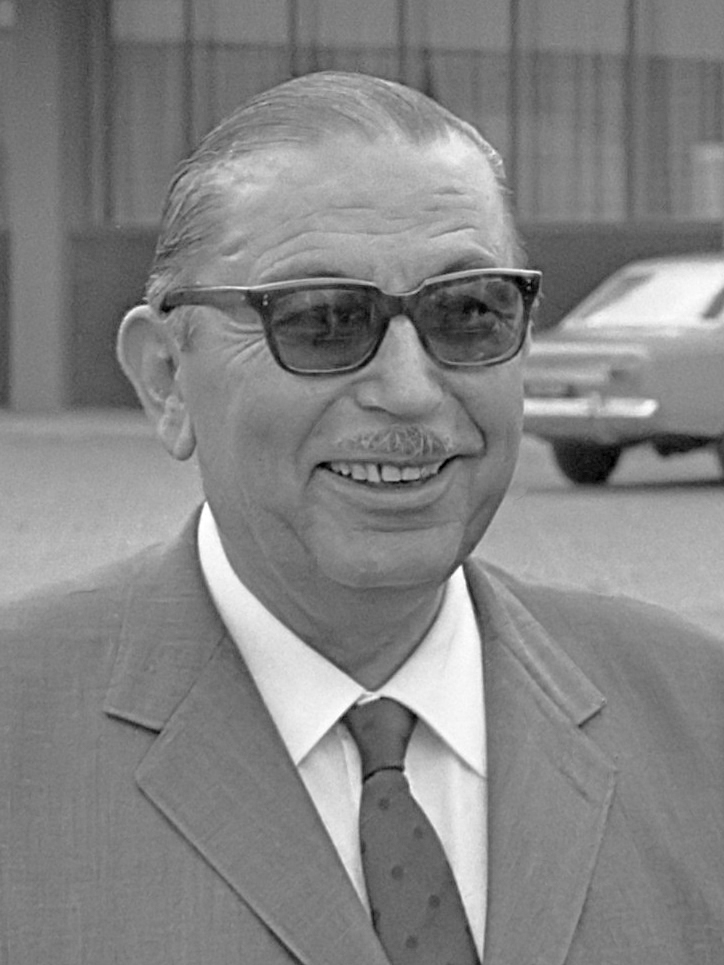
8 years, 35 days İhsan Sabri Çağlayangil from 1965 to 1971, from 1975 to 1977 and from 1977 to 1978

This is a list of Turkish ministers of foreign affairs by time in office. This is based on the difference between dates; if counted by number of calendar days all the figures would be one greater. Tevfik Rüştü Aras is the only person to have served as Minister of Foreign Affairs for more than ten years.

No. in office	Secretary	Length of service	Rank
6	Tevfik Rüştü Aras	13 years, 253 days	1
44	Mevlüt Çavuşoğlu	8 years, 192 days	2
17	İhsan Sabri Çağlayangil	8 years, 35 days	3
43	Mehmet Fuat Köprülü	5 years, 166 days	4
11	Ahmet Davutoğlu	5 years, 120 days	5
38	İsmail Cem	5 years, 12 days	6
41	Abdullah Gül	4 years, 168 days	7
25	Vahit Melih Halefoğlu	4 years, 8 days	8
7	Şükrü Saracoğlu	3 years, 365 days	9
24	İlter Türkmen	3 years, 84 days	10
9	Hasan Saka	2 years, 362 days	11
15	Feridun Cemal Erkin	2 years, 331 days	12
13	Fatin Rüştü Zorlu	2 years, 319 days	13
10	Necmettin Sadak	2 years, 254 days	14
30	Hikmet Çetin	2 years, 248 days	15
26	Mesut Yılmaz	2 years, 62 days	16
19	Ümit Haluk Bayülken	2 years, 46 days	17
4	İsmet İnönü	2 years, 28 days	18
22	Ahmet Gündüz Ökçün	1 year, 341 days	19
8	Numan Menemencioğlu	1 year, 307 days	20
14	Selim Sarper	1 year, 300 days	21
42	Ali Babacan	1 year, 245 days	22
3	Yusuf Kemal Tengirşenk	1 year, 162 days	23
1	Bekir Sami Kunduh	1 year, 5 days	24
37	Tansu Çiller	1 year, 2 days	25
46	Hakan Fidan	3 years, 96 days	26
23	Hayrettin Erkmen	298 days	27
20	Turan Güneş	295 days	28
18	Osman Esim Olcay	260 days	29
28	Ahmet Kurtcebe Alptemoçin	253 days	30
16	Hasan Esat Işık	249 days	31
27	Ali Bozer	233 days	32
33	Erdal İnönü	192 days	33
29	Safa Giray	150 days	34
21	Melih Esenbel	134 days	35
39	Şükrü Sina Gürel	129 days	36
35	Deniz Baykal	128 days	37
31	Mümtaz Soysal	124 days	38
40	Yaşar Yakış	116 days	39
36	Emre Gönensay	114 days	40
32	Murat Karayalçın	105 days	41
12	Adnan Menderes	103 days	42
5	Şükrü Kaya	101 days	43
45	Feridun Sinirlioğlu	88 days	44
34	Coşkun Kırca	25 days	45
2	Ahmet Muhtar Mollaoğlu	8 days	45
