= Türkmen (surname) =

Türkmen is a Turkish surname. As of 2014, there are 77,013 people with the surname Türkmen in Turkey, making it the 139th most common surname in the country. Notable people with the surname are as follows:

- Behçet Türkmen (1899–1968), Turkish military officer
- Cem Türkmen (born 2002), Turkish football player
- Ekin Türkmen (born 1984), Turkish actress
- Elif Doğan Türkmen (born 1962), Turkish politician
- Esra Türkmen (born 2002), Turkish javelin thrower
- Gökhan Türkmen (born 1983), Turkish singer
- Hüseyin Türkmen, (born 1998), Turkish football player
- İlter Türkmen (1927–2022), Turkish diplomat
- Mehmet Tayfun Türkmen (born 1962), Turkish football manager
- Muhammed Türkmen (born 1986), Turkish football player
- Tayfun Türkmen (born 1978), Turkish football player
