= Erol Güngör =

Turkish social psychologist (1938–1983)

Erol Güngör (Born Nov. 25 1938 in Kırşehir- Died 1983) was a Turkish social psychologist and writer. His work focused on the socially derived nature of language, morality, and values. Güngör wrote extensively on nationalism and culture at a time when Turkey was attempting to develop a national democratic identity.

== Early life and education ==
Born in Central Anatolia, Turkey, Güngör first attended Istanbul University as a law student in 1956. However, after meeting his mentor Mumtaz Tarhan, Güngör switched to psychology. He eventually received his PhD in experimental psychology in 1965 after writing a dissertation titled "Kelami Yapılarda Estetik Organizasyon" (or "Aesthetic Organization in Verbal Structures"), which focused on the aesthetic influence of language outside of reason or function.

From 1966 to 1967, Güngör conducted research at the University of Colorado, Boulder under the Fulbright visiting scholar program. At Boulder, his research focused on how connotative differences in the meaning of words can lead to a conflict between individuals.

In 1971, Güngör returned to Istanbul University to become an assistant professor in experimental psychology. By 1978, he had become a full professor as well the Experimental Psychology Chair, teaching social psychology throughout his tenure. In 1982, he left the University of Istanbul to be the founding rector of Selçuk University in Konya where he would pass away from a sudden heart attack a year into his new role.

== Political and social influence ==
Most of Güngör's influence comes form his writings about a modern Turkish national culture at time when Turkey was attempting to find its identity after the fall of the Ottoman Empire. Güngör proposed a dynamic definition of morality that is balanced between society and the individual, and whose balance serves to help one another. He argued the laws of society and morality of the individual should be as close as possible for a peaceful society, for they reflect shared values that establish emotions and discernment.

Güngör also focused on the intersection of globalization and traditional Islamic Turkish values, believing that a modern Turkish society did not have to reject cultural values. Güngör criticized his mentor Mumtaz Tarhan as too conservative and rigid, arguing Turkey needed to modernize in a way that promoted both democracy and Turkish culture. Güngör recognized culture is ever changing while also arguing some Turkish scholars were beginning to criticize their own background. While the contemporary Turkish government attempts to situate Güngör as a conservative Islamic scholar, Güngör argued for a society that embraced both Islamic culture and democracy.

== Selected work ==
- Güngör, Erol (1968). "The Role of Differential Connotations in Interpersonal Conflict"
- Güngör, Erol (1995). Türk kültürü ve milliyetçilik
- Dünden Bugüne Tarih Kültür ve Milliyetçilik (Ötüken Neşriyat, Istanbul, 2020)
- Islam'ın Bugünkü Meseleleri (Ötüken Neşriyat, Istanbul, 1998)
- Islam Tasavvufunun Meseleleri (Ötüken Neşriyat, Istanbul, 2000)
