= Ali Haydar Görk =

Turkish diplomat (1905–1966)

Ali Haydar Görk (26 October 1905 in Istanbul – 23 March 1966) was a Turkish diplomat and the ambassador of Turkey to the United States.

== Biography ==
He graduated from Robert College in 1926. He continued his studies at Sciences Po Paris in economics and finance in Paris in 1928.

His career started on 7 April 1929 at the Ministry of Foreign Affairs, where he held various positions in diplomatic missions in Moscow, Rome, Tokyo, Warsaw, Madrid, Paris, Washington D.C., as well as the headquarters in Ankara. He was the ambassador of Turkey to the United States from 31 May 1955 until 19 April 1957.

After these assignments, he retired on 4 March 1961.

He died on 23 March 1966 in a car accident while traveling from Ankara to Istanbul.
