= Munir Ertegün =

Turkish diplomat (1883–1944)

Münir Ertegün
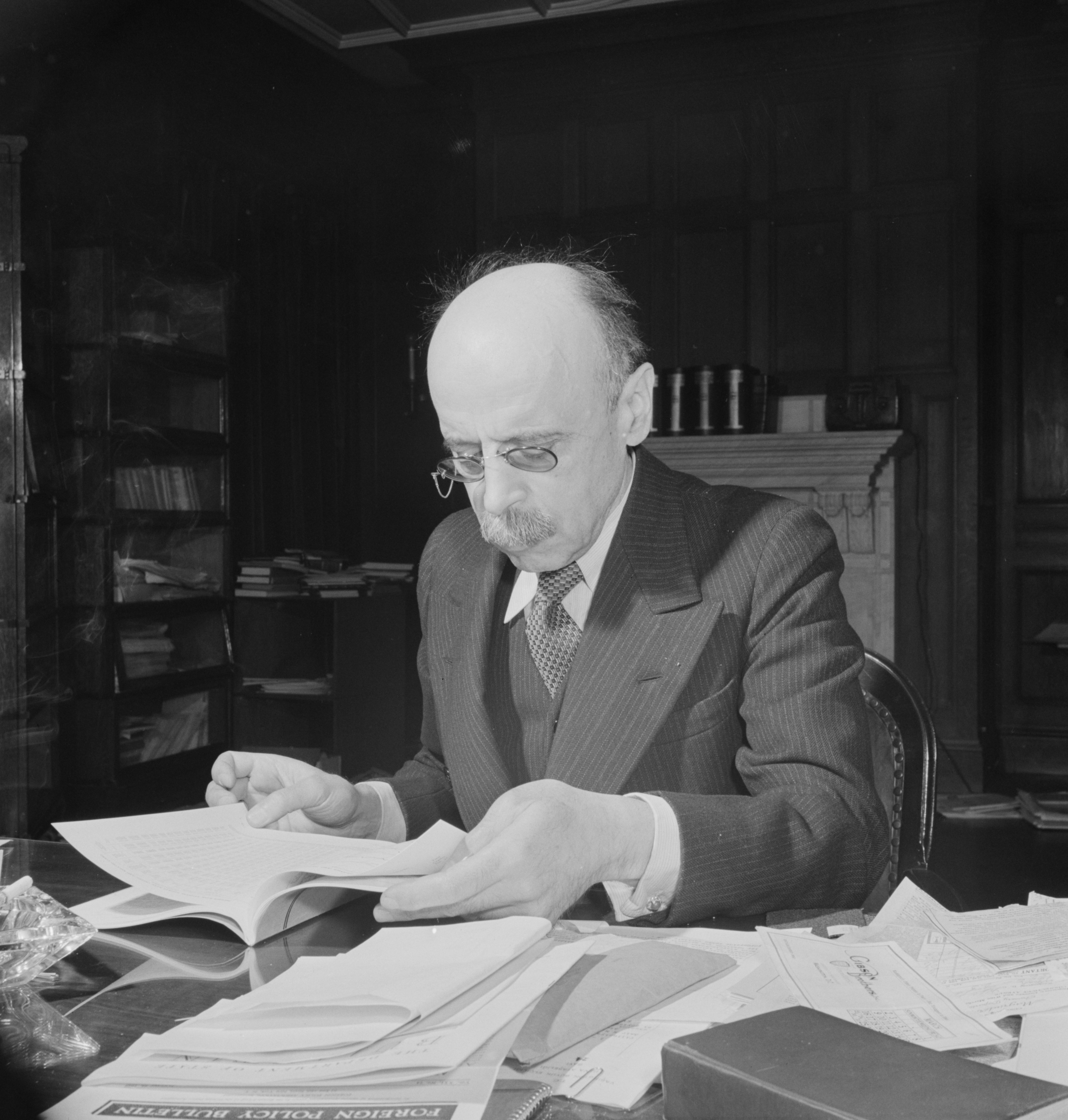
- Münir Ertegün in 1942

2nd Ambassador of Turkey to the United States
- In office 1934–1944
- President: Mustafa Kemal Atatürk; İsmet İnönü
- Preceded by: Ahmet Muhtar Mollaoğlu
- Succeeded by: Orhan Halit Erol

4th Ambassador of Turkey to the United Kingdom
- In office 1932–1934
- President: Mustafa Kemal Atatürk
- Preceded by: Ahmet Ferit Tek
- Succeeded by: Ali Fethi Okyar

2nd Ambassador of Turkey to France
- In office 1930–1932
- President: Mustafa Kemal Atatürk
- Preceded by: Fethi Okyar
- Succeeded by: Behiç Erkin

Ambassador of Turkey to Switzerland
- In office 1925–1930
- President: Mustafa Kemal Atatürk
- Preceded by: Refik Birgen
- Succeeded by: Cemal Hüsnü Taray

Personal details
- Born: Mehmet Münir Cemil; 1883 Constantinople, Ottoman Empire
- Died: 11 November 1944 (aged 60–61) Washington, DC, US
- Resting place: Sultantepe, Üsküdar, Istanbul
- Spouse: Emine Hayrünnisa Rüstem (m. 1917)
- Children: 3, including Ahmet and Nesuhi
- Education: Istanbul University (Law)
- Occupation: Diplomat; legal counsel

Mehmet Münir Ertegün (1883 – 11 November 1944) was a Turkish legal counsel in international law to the "Sublime Porte" (imperial government) of the late Ottoman Empire and a diplomat of the Republic of Turkey during its early years. Ertegün married Emine Hayrünnisa Rüstem in 1917 and the couple had three children, two of whom were Nesuhi and Ahmet Ertegün, the brothers who founded Atlantic Records and became iconic figures in the American music industry.

== Life and career ==
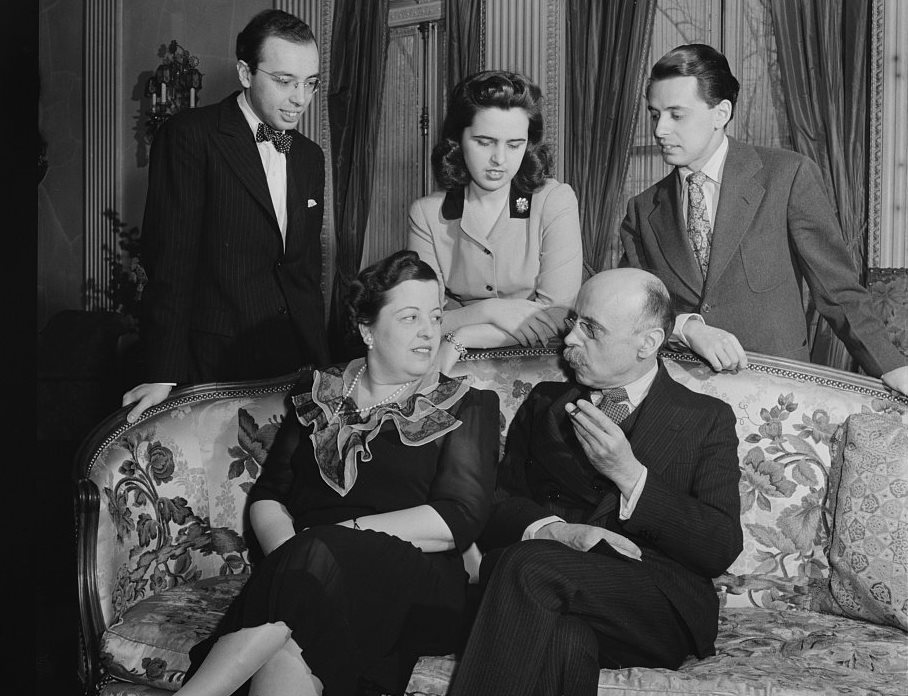
The Turkish Ambassador to Washington, Münir Ertegün and his family, including his sons Ahmet Ertegün (left) and Nesuhi Ertegün (right), and his daughter, Selma (middle) in February 1942

Born in Istanbul to a civil servant father, Mehmed Cemil Bey, and a mother Ayşe Hamide Hanım, who was a daughter of Sufi shaykh İbrahim Edhem Efendi, he studied law at Darülfünûn-u Şahâne (دار الفنون شهانه), now Istanbul University, and graduated in 1908. He was a legal counsel for the Ottoman Ministry of Foreign Affairs, when he saw the birth of his first son, Nesuhi, on 26 November 1917, in Constantinople (now Istanbul), during the First World War. Taking part in an Ottoman delegation with a mission to seek reconciliation with the Nationalists in Ankara, by the end of 1920, changed his destiny. While the two Ottoman ministers heading the delegation returned to Istanbul after not achieving an understanding with the revolutionaries led by Mustafa Kemal Pasha he chose to join the National Struggle and remained in Ankara, leaving behind his young wife and three-year-old son, Nesuhi. He became an aide to Mustafa Kemal during the Turkish War of Independence and the chief legal counsel of the Turkish delegation to the resulting Treaty of Lausanne in 1923.

After the Western powers recognized the newly founded Republic of Turkey in 1923, he was sent to Geneva to the League of Nations as an observer for the Turkish Republic. During this assignment, he frequently went to Paris for the Ottoman public debt negotiations. Following this posting to the League of Nations, he was appointed ambassador to Switzerland (1925–1930), France (1930–1932), the United Kingdom (1932–1934) and the United States (1934–1944).

=== As ambassador to the United States ===
As the Republic's ambassador to Washington, Ertegün opened his embassy's parlors to African American jazz musicians, who gathered there to play freely in a socio-historical context which was deeply divided by racial segregation at the time.

As part of his government's official position denying the Armenian Genocide, Ertegün worked to remove any mention of it in American popular culture. In 1934, he led an aggressive and ultimately successful campaign to quash a film adaptation by MGM of Austrian writer Franz Werfel's Forty Days of Musa Dagh, a historical dramatization of an episode from the genocide. Speaking to an MGM official, Ertegün threatened that ″If the movie is made, Turkey will launch a worldwide campaign against it. It rekindles the Armenian Question. The Armenian Question is settled.″

He became the Dean of the Diplomatic Corps in May 1944. He held this last post until he died in Washington, D.C., of a heart attack in November of the same year.

=== Death ===
In April 1946, a year after World War II had ended, his body was carried back to Istanbul aboard the USS Missouri and buried in the garden of Sufi tekke, Özbekler Tekkesi in Sultantepe, Üsküdar. near his shaykh grandfather İbrahim Edhem Efendi, who was once the head of the Tekke. (His two sons Nesuhi and Ahmet Ertegün also rest there.)

When Ertegün died, there was not yet a mosque in Washington, D.C., at which his funeral could be held. The Islamic Center of Washington was built as a result.

He also had a daughter named Selma Göksel.

== See also ==
- List of Turkish diplomats
