= Şükrü Elekdağ =

Turkish politician (born 1924)

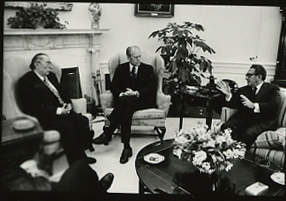

Member of the Grand National Assembly
- In office 3 November 2002 – 12 June 2011
- Constituency: Istanbul (III) (2002, 2007)

Ambassador of Turkey to Japan
- In office 1970–1974
- President: Fahri S. Korutürk
- Preceded by: Turgud Aytuğ
- Succeeded by: Celal Eyicioğlu

Undersecretary of the Ministry of Foreign Affair
- In office 1974–1979
- President: Fahri S. Korutürk

Ambassador of Turkey to the United States
- In office 1979–1989
- President: Fahri S. Korutürk; Kenan Evren
- Preceded by: Melih Esenbel
- Succeeded by: Nüzhet Kandemir

Personal details
- Born: Mustafa Şükrü Elekdağ; 29 September 1924 (age 102) Istanbul, Turkey
- Party: Republican People's Party
- Spouse: Ayla Elekdağ
- Children: 4
- Education: Galatasaray High School; Istanbul Higher Education School of Economics and Commerce (BA); University of Paris (PgD, MEc)
- Profession: Diplomat, academician, politician
- Website: Official website

Mustafa Şükrü Elekdağ (pronounced [ʃyˈcɾy elekdaː]; born 29 September 1924) is a Turkish diplomat, academician, and politician.

He graduated from Galatasaray High School and received his undergraduate from Istanbul Higher Education School of Economics and Commerce, which is the precursor of Marmara University. He earned a postgraduate degree and became Master of Economics from the University of Paris with the help of a scholarship from the French government.

He served as the Undersecretary of the Ministry of Foreign Affairs, the Ambassador of Turkey to Japan (1970–1974), and the United States (1979–1989). He was also the Member of Parliament (2002–2011) from the Republican People's Party.

He was one of the prepotent foreign policymakers of Turkey in the 1990s. In 1994, he wrote the 2½ War Strategy about Turkey's neighborhood relations and national security policy. He was a senior lecturer at Bilkent University between 1990–2002 and gave lectures about strategy, Turkish foreign policy, and security.

Elekdağ has played an important role in Turkey's Armenian genocide denial efforts. In 1982, he claimed that Turkey had not threatened the lives of Jews due to the inclusion of the Armenian genocide in the program of the International Conference on the Holocaust and Genocide in Tel Aviv. This claim was false. Historian Taner Akçam describes Elekdag's policy on the Armenian Genocide as "extreme nationalist and aggressive denial".

Diplomatic posts
Preceded by Turgud Aytuğ	Ambassador of Turkey to Japan; 1970–1974	Succeeded by Celal Eyicioğlu
Preceded by Melih Esenbel	Ambassador of Turkey to the United States; 1979–1989	Succeeded by Nüzhet Kandemir
