= İhsan Sabri Çağlayangil =

Turkish politician (1908–1993)

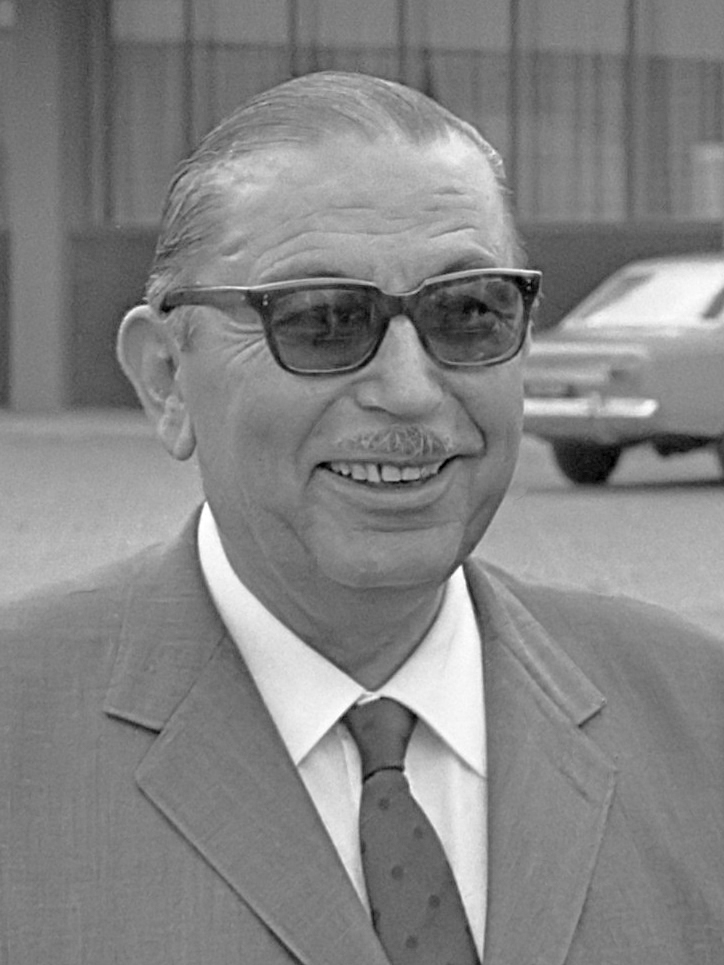
- Çağlayangil in 1968

Acting President of Turkey
- In office 6 April 1980 – 12 September 1980
- Prime Minister: Süleyman Demirel
- Preceded by: Fahri Korutürk
- Succeeded by: Kenan Evren

President of the Senate of Turkey
- In office 6 November 1979 – 12 September 1980
- Preceded by: Sırrı Atalay
- Succeeded by: Office abolished

Minister of Foreign Affairs
- In office 27 October 1965 – 26 March 1971
- Prime Minister: Süleyman Demirel; Nihat Erim
- Preceded by: Hasan Esat Işık
- Succeeded by: Osman Olcay
- In office 31 March 1975 – 21 June 1977
- Prime Minister: Süleyman Demirel
- Preceded by: Melih Esenbel
- Succeeded by: Ahmet Gündüz Ökçün
- In office 21 July 1977 – 5 January 1978
- Prime Minister: Süleyman Demirel
- Preceded by: Ahmet Gündüz Ökçün
- Succeeded by: Ahmet Gündüz Ökçün

Minister of Labor
- In office 20 February 1965 – 27 November 1965
- Prime Minister: Suat Hayri Ürgüplü
- Preceded by: Bülent Ecevit
- Succeeded by: Ali Naili Erdem

Personal details
- Born: 1 January 1908 Istanbul, Ottoman Empire
- Died: 30 December 1993 (aged 85) Ankara, Turkey
- Resting place: Zincirlikuyu Cemetery, Istanbul
- Party: Justice Party (1961–1980); True Path Party (1987–1993)
- Spouse: Emine Furuzende Çağlayangil
- Children: Fatma Itır Çağlayangil
- Education: Istanbul High School
- Alma mater: Istanbul University
- Occupation: Lawyer; diplomat; politician

İhsan Sabri Çağlayangil (1 January 1908 – 30 December 1993) was a Turkish politician and diplomat who served as Acting President of Turkey in 1980, from the Justice Party (Turkish: Adalet Partisi). He also served as Minister of Foreign Affairs three times in the 1960s and 1970s.

== Background and personal life ==
Çağlayangil was born in Istanbul in 1908 as the son of a man named M. Sabri. He graduated from Saint-Joseph High School. Then he entered the School of Law at Istanbul University and graduated in 1932.

He was married to Firuzende Çağlayangil starting in 1953 and had a daughter named Fatma Itir Çağlayangil.

== Career ==
After completing his studies, he became a civil servant and was in charge of the arrangements for the trial and the hanging of Seyit Riza and several Kurdish leaders of the Dersim Rebellion. In 1948 he became governor of the Yozgat province, which was followed by stints as governor of Çanakkale in 1953 then Sivas in 1954 until he went to Bursa. Çağlayangil was Governor of Bursa Province from 1954 to 1960.

He served as Minister of Labour and Social Security in the 29th government of Turkey, a caretaker government prior to the 1965 general election. After the election he served as the Minister of Foreign Affairs of Turkey from 1965 to 1971, until the 1971 coup.

He was Minister of Foreign Affairs again in 1975–1977, and 1977–1978. In March 1977, in his role as Minister of Foreign Affairs, he visited the USSR where an agreement was reached between Turkey and the country for long-term economic, scientific, and technical cooperation. Çağlayangil was Chairman of the Senate from November 7, 1979 to September 12, 1980 (the 1980 coup). In this capacity he was Acting President of Turkey after Fahri Korutürk's term expired on 6 April 1980. He was a member of the Justice Party (Turkish: Adalet Partisi).

Political offices
Preceded by Hasan Esat Işık	Minister of Foreign Affairs; 1965–1971	Succeeded by Osman Esim Olcay
Preceded by Melih Esenbel	Minister of Foreign Affairs; 1975–1977	Succeeded by Ahmet Gündüz Ökçün
Preceded by Ahmet Gündüz Ökçün	Minister of Foreign Affairs; 1977–1978	Succeeded by Ahmet Gündüz Ökçün
Preceded by Sırrı Atalay	President of the Turkish Senate; 1979–1980	Position abolished
Preceded by Fahri Korutürk	President of Turkey; Acting; 1980	Succeeded by Kenan Evren
