= Nüzhet Kandemir =

Turkish diplomat and politician

Mehmet Nüzhet Kandemir (born October 8, 1934, Istanbul - died July 17, 2016, Ankara) was a Turkish diplomat and politician.

== Education and career ==
He graduated from Galatasaray High School and Ankara University Faculty of Political Science (1957). He served as Deputy Permanent Representative of Turkey at the United Nations Office in Geneva, Deputy International Officer and Division Deputy Director at the UN Office in Geneva, Turkish Ambassador to Iraq, and Undersecretary of the Ministry of Foreign Affairs. After serving as the Turkish Ambassador to the United States, he retired from the Ministry of Foreign Affairs.

Between 2000 and 2005, he served as one of the 13 judges elected by the United Nations Economic and Social Council (ECOSOC) as a member of the United Nations International Narcotics Control Board (INCB). He also served as the Deputy Chairman responsible for Foreign Relations of the True Path Party (DYP) until the Turkish general elections on July 22, 2007.

== Personal life ==
Nüzhet Kandemir was fluent in Turkish, French, English, and Spanish. He was married to Sadiye Kandemir.
