= Representation offices in Turkey =

Representation offices in Turkey, known locally as "Temsilcilikler," are regional branches of the Turkish Ministry of Foreign Affairs (MFA) situated within the Republic of Turkey. These offices serve as the ministry's regional arms, extending the reach of Turkish diplomatic efforts beyond the capital, Ankara. As of the latest laws, there are seven such offices in Turkey, located in the cities of Antalya, Diyarbakir, Edirne, Gaziantep, Hatay, Istanbul, and Izmir.

== Function and role ==
The primary role of these representation offices is to coordinate the foreign relations of Turkey at the regional level. Unlike ambassadors in foreign countries, the heads of these offices do not represent the President of Turkey but serve under the directive of the Minister of Foreign Affairs. Their main functions include:

- Coordinating visits of foreign dignitaries to their respective cities.

- Collaborating with international organizations, including the United Nations.

- Managing the involvement of foreign governments’ aid and rescue teams, especially during emergencies such as natural disasters.

- Enhancing regional diplomatic relations and representing the interests of the Ministry of Foreign Affairs within their jurisdictions.

== Organizational structure ==
Each office is headed by an ambassador. As of the current records, the representation offices and their respective heads are:

- **Antalya Representation Office**: Ambassador Deha Erpek

- **Diyarbakir Representation Office**: Ambassador Hakan Çakıl

- **Edirne Representation Office**: The head ambassador is currently unlisted.

- **Gaziantep Representation Office**: Ambassador Adnan Keçeci

- **Hatay Representation Office**: Ambassador Devrim Öztürk

- **Istanbul Representation Office**: Ambassador Salih Murat Tamer

- **Izmir Representation Office**: Ambassador Naciye Gökçen Kaya

These ambassadors maintain a protocol status equivalent to that of city governors, although their functions do not overlap. The ambassadors work alongside, but independently from, the city governors.

== Operational distinctions ==
Despite their titles, the ambassadors in these offices do not engage in activities typically associated with governors, such as providing security for foreign dignitaries. Such responsibilities remain within the purview of the governor's office. Instead, the representation offices focus on diplomatic and international coordination within their respective cities.

== Coordination in crisis ==
A notable function of the representation offices is their role during crises. For instance, following the 2023 earthquakes in Turkey, these offices were instrumental in organizing and facilitating international aid efforts. They served as vital links between the Turkish government and international aid organizations, managing the logistics and operational aspects of foreign governmental support.
