= Şükrü Kaya =

Turkish politician and Minister of Interior

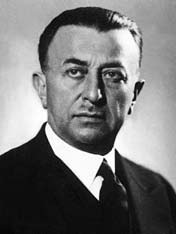

Minister of Interior
- In office 25 October 1937 – 11 November 1938
- Prime Minister: Celal Bayar
- Succeeded by: Refik Saydam

Minister of Interior
- In office 1 November 1927 – 25 October 1937
- Prime Minister: İsmet İnönü
- Preceded by: Mehmet Cemil Uybadın

Minister of Foreign Affairs
- In office 21 November 1924 – 3 March 1925
- Prime Minister: Ali Fethi Okyar
- Preceded by: İsmet İnönü
- Succeeded by: Tevfik Rüştü Aras

Minister of Agriculture
- In office 31 August 1924 – 21 October 1924
- Prime Minister: İsmet İnönü
- Preceded by: Zekai Apaydın
- Succeeded by: Hasan Fehmi (Ataç)

Mayor and Governor of Izmir
- In office 1922–1924

Personal details
- Born: 9 March 1883 Istanköy, Ottoman Empire
- Died: 10 January 1959 (aged 75) Istanbul, Turkey
- Education: Galatasaray High School
- Alma mater: Istanbul University Law School; University of Paris
- Profession: Jurist
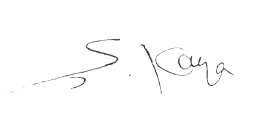
- Signature

Şükrü Kaya (9 March 1883 – 10 January 1959) was a Turkish civil servant and politician, who served as government minister, Minister of Interior and Minister of Foreign affairs in several governments. He is one of the perpetrators of the Armenian genocide.

== Biography ==
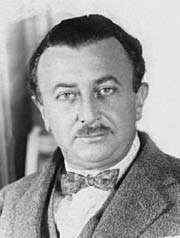
Şükrü Kaya in the 1920s

Born in İstanköy (Kos), part of the Dodecanese in the then Ottoman Empire, he finished Galatasaray High School before he graduated from Law School in 1908. He did his graduate work in Paris, France. He worked as inspector of treasury for the Empire.

At the start of World War I, Şükrü was appointed the Director of Settlement of Tribes and Migrants (Aşair ve Muhacirin Genel Müdürü), a subdivision within the Interior Ministry, and mainly tasked with managing the Armenian deportations during the Armenian genocide. In September 1915, he was transferred to Aleppo, an important location along the deportation route into the Syrian desert.

While the Armenian Genocide was underway, Şükrü was tasked to administrate the concentration camps of Armenian deportees located in Syria. In order to manage the large influx of Armenians into the area, Şükrü started a policy that enforced a certain ratio of Armenians to be left untouched. However, once the Armenians exceeded this ratio, they were evacuated from their camps and subsequently massacred. On 19 December 1915, Şükrü is noted to have said to German engineer Bastendorff the following:

The final solution is the termination of the Armenian race. Clashes that have continued between Armenians and Muslims all along have now reached their final stage. The weaker side will be destroyed.

He was then assigned to Iraq but he resigned and moved to İzmir.

He worked as a teacher in Buca Sultanisi (high school). After the Armistice of Mudros, he worked for the Turkish national movement. Following the occupation of Istanbul by the Entente powers, he was arrested by the British administration and was exiled to Malta. He escaped to the continent from Malta and subsequently went to Anatolia and joined the Turkish War of Independence.

In September 1925 he was a member of the Reform Council for the Reform of the East (Turkish: Şark İslahat Encümeni) which prepared the Report for Reform in the East (Turkish: Şark İslahat Raporu). In 1930 he was the author of the outlines of Turkification (Turkish: Türkleştirme Genelgesi). Non-Turkish languages should be suppressed and non-Turkish names of locations changed to Turkish ones.

Şükrü Kaya served as Minister of Agriculture, Minister of Foreign Affairs and Interior Minister in several cabinets between 1924 and 1938.

He died on 10 January 1959, in Istanbul.

Political offices
Preceded by İsmet İnönü	Minister of Foreign Affairs of Turkey; 21 November 1924–4 March 1925	Succeeded by Tevfik Rüştü Aras
Preceded by Mehmet Cemil Uybadın	Minister of Interior of Turkey; 1 November 1927–11 November 1938	Succeeded by Refik Saydam
