= Hüseyin Numan Menemencioğlu =

Turkish politician and diplomat (1893–1958)

Hüseyin Nuğman Kemal Menemencioğlu
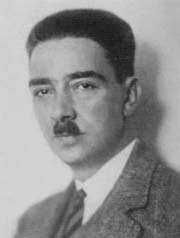
- Menemencioğlu in the 1930s

Minister of Foreign Affairs
- In office 9 July 1942 – 16 June 1944
- Prime Minister: Şükrü Saracoğlu
- Preceded by: Şükrü Saracoğlu
- Succeeded by: Hasan Saka

Personal details
- Born: 1893 Baghdad, Ottoman Empire
- Died: 1958 (aged 64–65)
- Party: Republican People's Party; Democrat Party
- Education: University of Lausanne

Hüseyin Numan Menemencioğlu (1893–1958) was a Turkish diplomat and politician.

== Biography ==
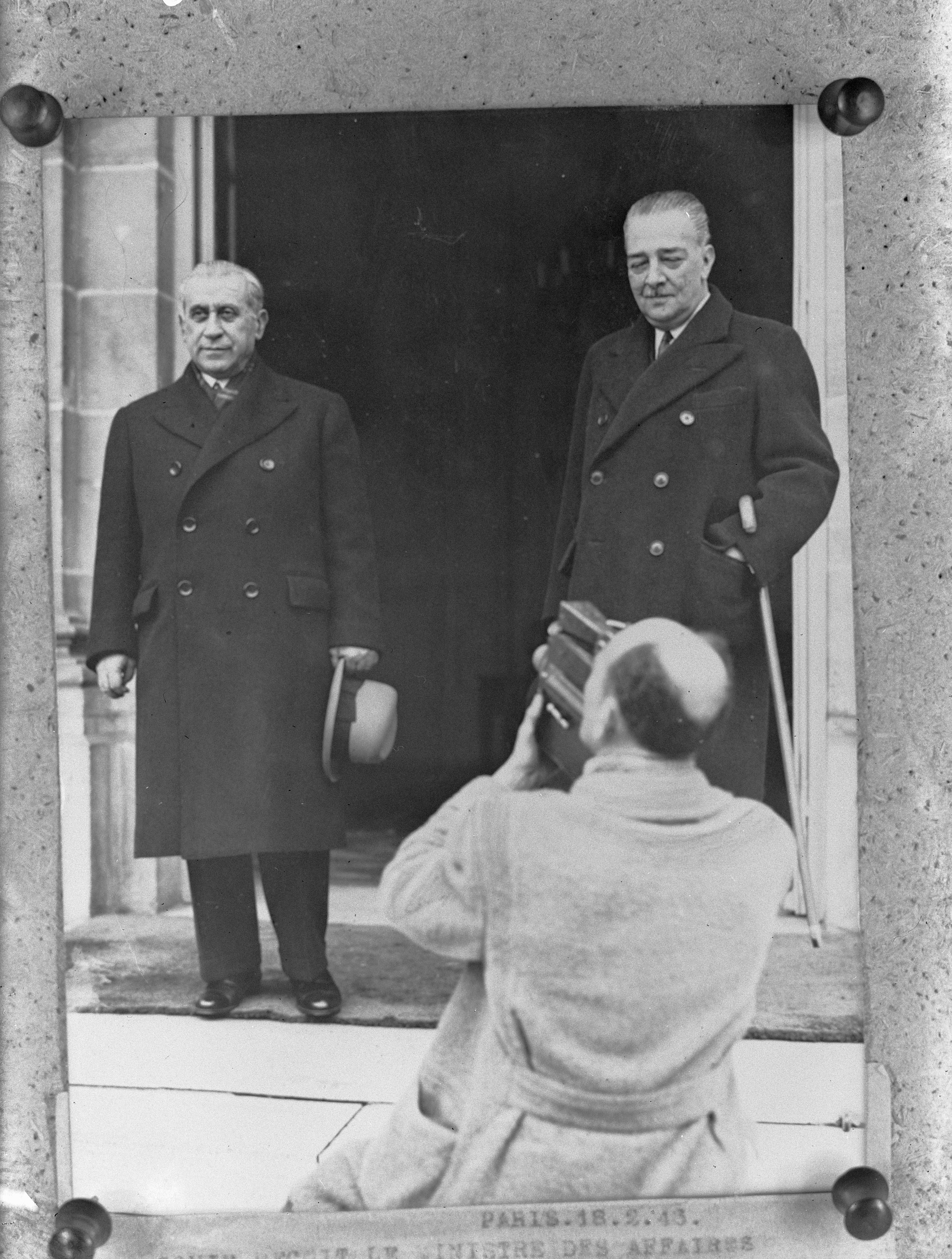
Hasan Saka and Hüseyin Numan Menemencioğlu (right)

His father, Rıfat, from the Aydın Province (west Turkey), was a civil servant and a Minister of Finance in the Ottoman Empire. His mother Feride, of Albanian origin, was the daughter of Namık Kemal, a well known 19th-century intellectual. During his father's various postings, he was born in Baghdad, and graduated from the junior high school in Salonika (now Thessaloniki). He graduated from high school in Istanbul. After graduation, he began serving in the foreign office of the Ottoman Empire.

After the Occupation of Constantinople by the Allies of World War I, he began serving for the newly founded Turkey. He served in Bern, Bucharest, Budapest, and Beirut. After 1929 he was named as the secretary general of the Ministry. He was a brilliant diplomat and he participated in such negotiations like the Straits issue (Treaty of Montreux) and Hatay issue (Hatay Republic). He went into politics and was elected as the Republican People's Party deputy from Gaziantep Province. Between 9 July 1942 and 16 June 1944, in the 13th and the 14th government of Turkey, he was appointed minister of foreign affairs. His term coincided with the Second World War. After politics, he resumed his diplomatic mission and was appointed the ambassador to France and then Portugal.

After retirement, he returned to politics in the 1957 general elections and was elected as a Democrat Party MP from İstanbul Province. However, he soon died, on 15 February 1958, in Istanbul.

Political offices
Preceded by Şükrü Saracoğlu	Minister of Foreign Affairs of Turkey; July 9, 1942–June 16, 1944	Succeeded by Hasan Saka
