= Vahit Melih Halefoğlu =

Turkish politician and diplomat (1919–2017)

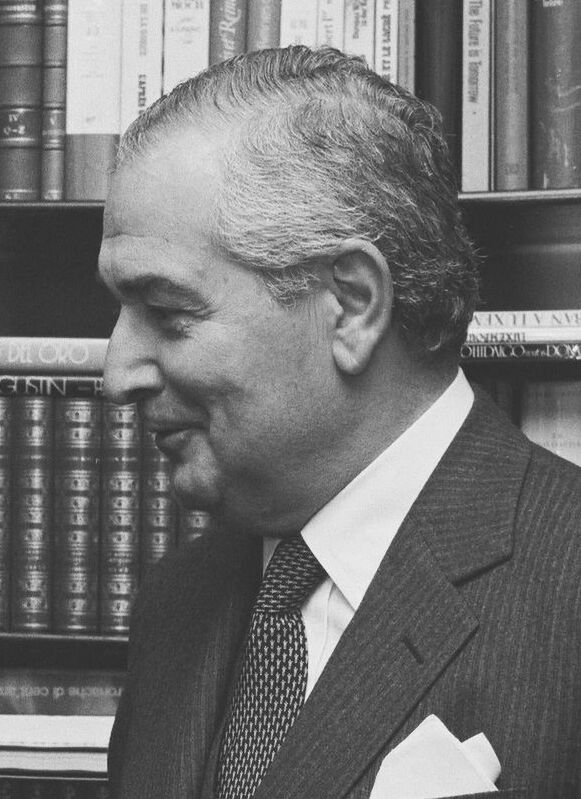

25th Minister of Foreign Affairs
- In office 13 December 1983 – 21 December 1987
- Prime Minister: Turgut Özal
- Preceded by: İlter Türkmen
- Succeeded by: Mesut Yılmaz

Personal details
- Born: 19 November 1919 Antakya, Ottoman Empire (now Turkey)
- Died: 20 January 2017 (aged 97) Istanbul, Turkey
- Party: Motherland Party (ANAP)
- Education: Ankara University, School of Political Science
- Profession: Diplomat, politician

Vahit Melih Halefoğlu (19 November 1919 – 20 January 2017) was a Turkish politician and diplomat.

Following his education at the School of Political Science in Ankara University in 1942 he entered the Ministry of Foreign Affairs. Between 1962 and 1983, Halefoğlu served as ambassador in Beirut (1962–1965), Kuwait City (1964–1965), Moscow (1965–1966, 1982–1983), The Hague (1966–1970) and Bonn (1972–1982).

After the general elections held in 1983, Turgut Özal appointed him Minister of Foreign Affairs from outside of the parliament. At the intermediate general elections of 1986, he was elected deputy of Ankara from the Motherland Party (ANAP). He did not stand for election in the 1987 general elections and ended his political career.

== Personal life ==
Halefoğlu was married to Zehra Bereket. Her father, Suphi Bereket, was the first President of the Syrian Federation.

Halefoğlu died on 20 January 2017 at the age of 97. He was interred at Zincirlikuyu Cemetery following the religious funeral service in Teşvikiye Mosque.

== See also ==
- List of Turkish diplomats

Political offices
Preceded by İlter Türkmen	Minister of Foreign Affairs of Turkey; 13 December 1983–21 December 1987	Succeeded by Mesut Yılmaz
