= İlter Türkmen =

Turkish diplomat and politician (1927–2022)

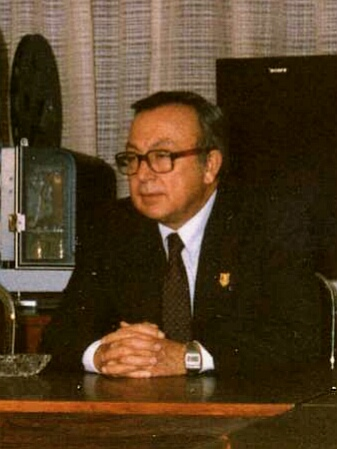
- Türkmen in 1980

Minister of Foreign Affairs
- In office 21 September 1980 – 24 October 1983
- President: Kenan Evren
- Preceded by: Hayrettin Erkmen
- Succeeded by: Vahit Melih Halefoğlu

Personal details
- Born: 8 November 1927 Istanbul, Turkey
- Died: 6 July 2022 (aged 94) Istanbul, Turkey
- Spouse: Füsun Türkmen
- Children: 2
- Parent: Behçet Türkmen (father)
- Education: Galatasaray High School
- Alma mater: Mekteb-i Mülkiye

İlter Türkmen (8 November 1927 – 6 July 2022) was a Turkish diplomat and politician.

== Life and career ==
Türkmen was the son of Behçet Türkmen (1899–1968), who between 1953 and 1957 was the director of the Turkish National Security Service (MAH). Permanent Representative to the United Nations in Geneva in 1983, 1985, Permanent Representative of Turkey to the United Nations in New York, in 1988, he served as Ambassador to Paris and retired in 1991. Following his retirement from the United Nations Secretary-General's special representative, between 1991 and 1996 with the title of Assistant to the Palestinian Refugee Relief Organization has worked as General Commissioner for international duty.

Türkmen was Turkey's permanent representative to the UN in New York (1975–1978 and 1985–1988) and was representative to the UN in Geneva (1983–1985). He also served as Turkey's ambassador to France, Greece and the USSR. Türkmen served from 1979 to 1980 as the UN Secretary-General's special representative in Thailand, dealing with humanitarian issues. From 1980 to 1983 Türkmen was the Foreign Minister of Turkey. Türkmen had been UNRWA Commissioner-General from 1991 to 1996.

Türkmen died in Istanbul on 6 July 2022, at the age of 94.

== See also ==
- List of Directors and Commissioners-General of the United Nations Relief and Works Agency for Palestine Refugees in the Near East
- Ministry of Foreign Affairs (Turkey)
- İhsan Sabri Çağlayangil – former Turkish diplomat and politician

== Sources ==
- Who is Who database – Biography of İlter Türkmen (in Turkish)

Political offices
Preceded by Hayrettin Erkmen	Minister of Foreign Affairs of Turkey; 21 September 1980 – 24 October 1983	Succeeded by Vahit Melih Halefoğlu
Positions in intergovernmental organisations
Preceded by Giorgio Giacomelli ( (Italy) )	Commissioner-General for United Nations Relief and Works Agency for Palestine Refugees in the Near East; 1 March 1991 – 29 February 1996	Succeeded by Peter Hansen ( (Denmark) )
