= Şükrü Sina Gürel =

Turkish diplomat and politician

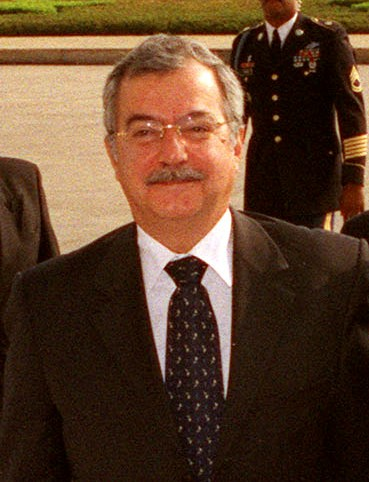

Deputy Prime Minister of Turkey
- In office 9 July 2002 – 18 November 2002
- Prime Minister: Bülent Ecevit
- Served with: Mesut Yılmaz; Devlet Bahçeli
- Preceded by: Hüsamettin Özkan
- Succeeded by: Mehmet Ali Şahin

Minister of Foreign Affairs
- In office 12 July 2002 – 18 November 2002
- Prime Minister: Bülent Ecevit
- Preceded by: İsmail Cem
- Succeeded by: Abdullah Gül

Minister of State responsible for Customs
- In office 11 January 1999 – 28 May 1999
- Prime Minister: Bülent Ecevit
- Preceded by: Rifat Serdaroğlu
- Succeeded by: Mehmet Keçeciler

Member of the Grand National Assembly
- In office 24 December 1995 – 3 November 2002
- Constituency: İzmir (II) (1995, 1999)

Personal details
- Born: 1 January 1950 (age 76) İzmir Turkey
- Party: Democratic Left (1991-2007) Republican People's Party (2007-2022) Victory Party (2022-present)
- Education: Robert College
- Alma mater: Ankara University (BA)

Şükrü Sina Gürel (born 1 January 1950) is a Turkish diplomat and political figure who served as the nation's foreign minister in mid-2002.

== Biography ==
A native of İzmir and a member of the Democratic Left Party (DSP), Gürel represented his country at the Council of Europe from 22 April 1996 to 26 January 1998. He became foreign minister following the resignation of his predecessor, İsmail Cem on 10 July 2002. Later in the year he ceded the office to Yaşar Yakış. Gürel returned to active politics by joining the Victory Party on 19 April 2022.

He is director of foreign affairs at Victory Party's board.

== Bibliography ==
- Tarihsel Boyutları İçinde: TÜRK - YUNAN İLİŞKİLERİ (1821 - 1993) (Turkish for Turkish-Greek relations), Ümit Yayıncılık, Ankara, 1993. Also translated in Greek (from the original Turkish) in 2008 as Οι Τουρκο-Ελληνικές σχέσεις (1821 - 1993) by Παντελής Τουλουμάκος (Pandelis Touloumakos).

Political offices
Preceded by İsmail Cem	Minister of Foreign Affairs of Turkey; 2002	Succeeded by Yaşar Yakış
