= Yaşar Yakış =

Turkish politician (1938–2024)

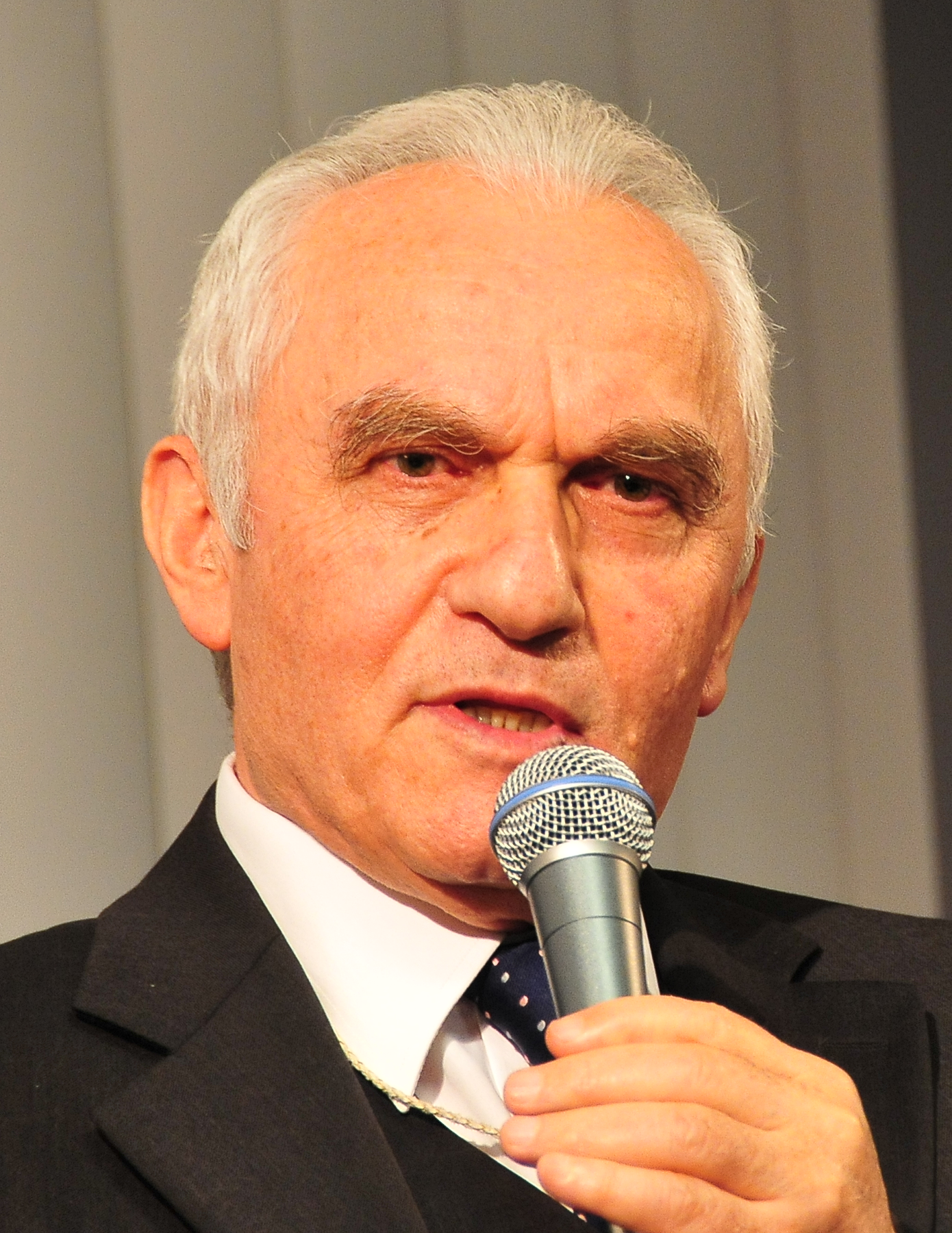
- Yakış in 2010

39th Minister of Foreign Affairs
- In office 18 November 2002 – 14 March 2003
- Prime Minister: Abdullah Gül
- Preceded by: Şükrü Sina Gürel
- Succeeded by: Abdullah Gül

Member of the Grand National Assembly
- In office 3 November 2002 – 12 June 2011
- Constituency: Düzce (2002, 2007)

Personal details
- Born: 1 August 1938 Akçakoca, Düzce, Turkey
- Died: 26 June 2024 (aged 85)
- Party: Justice and Development Party
- Education: Ankara University (BA)

Yaşar Yakış (1 August 1938 – 26 June 2024) was a Turkish politician. He was a Foreign Minister, and an ambassador to the UN Office in Vienna, Egypt, and Saudi Arabia. From 2002 to 2011 he represented Düzce as an MP in the Grand National Assembly of Turkey. He was a member of the Justice and Development Party, the leading political party in Turkey at the moment and he was the chair of the European Union Harmonization Committee of the Grand National Assembly of Turkey. He received the French Légion of Honour (Officer Medal on 2 December 2009).

== Early life and career ==
Yakış was born in Akçakoca on 1 August 1938. He graduated in 1962 from Ankara University, with B.A. degree in political sciences.

=== Diplomatic career ===
Yakış joined the Ministry of Foreign Affairs in 1962 and served at various posts at the Turkish Consulate General in Belgium and Turkish Embassy in Lagos, Nigeria. Attended the NATO Defense College in Rome, Italy. Appointed the Counsellor at the Turkish Delegation in NATO Brussels, he later became the Counsellor at the Turkish Embassy in Damascus, Syria. From 1978 to 1988 he held various positions within the Ministry of Foreign Affairs in Turkey, becoming Head of the Personnel Department and the head of the NATO Department and Head of COMCEC Coordination Office.

In 1988, became the Ambassador of Turkey to Riyadh, Saudi Arabia. Appointed the Deputy Under Secretary for Economic Affairs of the Ministry in 1992. In 1995, he became the Ambassador of Turkey to Cairo, Egypt.

From 1998 to 2000 he served as the Permanent Representative of Turkey to the United Nations Office and other international organizations based in Vienna. In 2000, he was appointed a Senior Policy Adviser at the Ministry of Foreign Affairs. In 2000–2001 he lectured "Turkey's Foreign Policy" at Bilkent University and "Water Diplomacy and Turkey's Foreign Policy" at Hacettepe University in Ankara. He spoke French, English and Arabic.

== Political career ==
In August 2001, Yakış became the founding member and Vice Chairman in charge of Foreign Affairs of the Justice and Development Party (AKP). He was elected as a Member of Parliament in the 2002 general election. He became the Minister of Foreign Affairs in the 58th government of Turkey led by Abdullah Gül until the AKP party leader Recep Tayyip Erdoğan was elected to Parliament and became Prime Minister in March 2003. Gül succeeded Yakış as foreign Minister. As Foreign Minister, Yakış participated as Minister of Foreign Affairs in the Convention to draft the Treaty establishing a Constitution for Europe in 2003.

Reelected as a Member of Parliament in the 2007 general election, he served as the Chairman of the European Union Commission and the Chairman of the Friendship Group with France in the Turkish Parliament before standing down as an MP at the 2011 general election.

== Death ==
Yakış died on 26 June 2024, at the age of 85.

== Awards ==
- Decoration of King Abdulaziz (1st degree) for his contribution to Turkish-Saudi relations -1992.
- Decoration of "Ordine della Stella della Soliderietà Italiana – Commendatore-2007" by the President of the Republic of Italy.
- Decoration of Légion of honour (Officer)

== Sources ==
- Who is Who database - Biography of Yaşar Yakış (in Turkish)
- Biyografi.net - Biography of Yaşar Yakış (in Turkish)

Political offices
Preceded by Şükrü Sina Gürel	Minister of Foreign Affairs; 2002–2003	Succeeded by Abdullah Gül
