= Melih Esenbel =

Turkish diplomat and politician

Minister of Foreign Affairs
- In office November 13, 1974 – March 30, 1975
- President: Fahri S. Korutürk
- Prime Minister: Sadi Irmak
- Preceded by: Turan Güneş
- Succeeded by: Ahmet Gündüz Ökçün

Ambassador of Turkey to the United States
- In office April 1, 1975 – July 14, 1979
- Preceded by: Aydın Yeğen
- Succeeded by: Mustafa Şükrü Elekdağ
- In office January 9, 1967 – November 1, 1974
- Preceded by: Rıfat Turgut Menemencioğlu
- Succeeded by: Aydın Yeğen
- In office March 24, 1960 – October 28, 1960
- Preceded by: Suat Hayri Ürgüplü
- Succeeded by: Bülent Uşaklıgil

Ambassador of Turkey to Japan
- In office January 1, 1963 – January 1, 1966
- Preceded by: Nejad Kemal Kavur
- Succeeded by: Turgut Aytuğ

Personal details
- Born: Melih Rauf Esenbel; March 15, 1915 Istanbul, Ottoman Empire
- Died: July 27, 1995 (aged 80) Istanbul, Turkey
- Education: Galatasaray High School
- Alma mater: Istanbul University Law School
- Profession: Diplomat; politician

Melih Rauf Esenbel (March 15, 1915 – July 27, 1995) was a Turkish diplomat and former Minister of Foreign Affairs.

== Early years ==
Melih Rauf was born 1915 in Istanbul. He was educated in law at Istanbul University following his graduation from Galatasaray High School.

In 1936, he entered in the service of the Ministry of Foreign Affairs as a probationary clerk. He left the post in 1937 due to his conscription.

Esenbel reentered the ministry after completing his military service in 1938, working first in the Economy Department and then in 1939 in the Commerce Department. The same year, he was appointed chancellor of the embassy in Paris, France. In 1940, he was promoted to the post of Third Secretary. After becoming Second Secretary in Paris, he returned home in 1943 to serve in the Protocols Department of the ministry. Esenbel worked first as Secondary Secretary, and later was promoted to Department Director.

In 1945, Esenbel was appointed principal secretary to the counselor at the embassy of Washington, D.C., United States, where he served also as counselor some time later.

From 1952 on, his further posts were at the ministry in Ankara, where he filled several executive positions becoming finally Secretary General of the ministry in 1957.

On February 17, 1959, Esenbel, in his capacity as the secretary general of the Ministry of Foreign Affairs, accompanied Prime Minister Adnan Menderes (in office 1950-1960), who was on the way to London, UK, to sign the London Agreement on the Cyprus issue with British Prime Minister Harold Macmillan and Greek Prime Minister Constantine Karamanlis. The charter flight of the Turkish Airlines carrying eight crew and a delegation of 18 government officials from Ankara via Istanbul and Rome, Italy, to London was diverted to Gatwick Airport due to poor visibility at Heathrow. The aircraft of type Vickers Viscount crashed in a wood during its final approach to land in extensive fog, and caught fire. Five of the crew and nine of the passengers died in the crash while Melih Esenbel was among the survivors with light injuries only. The prime minister survived without any injury.

== Career ==
In 1960, he served as Ambassador to Washington, D.C. from March 24 to October 28. Returned to Turkey, Esenbel became High Counselor to the Secretary General on December 1, 1960.

Esenbel's next foreign position took him to Tokyo, Japan, where he acted as ambassador from January 1, 1963, to January 1, 1966. On January 9, 1967, he was appointed the second time to the Embassy in the USA serving at this post until November 1, 1974.

Prime minister Sadi Irmak, who was tasked by President Fahri Korutürk with forming of a caretaker government, appointed Melih Esenbel as Minister of Foreign Affairs. He served at this post from November 13, 1974, until March 30, 1975, the resignation of the cabinet due to a vote of no confidence in the parliament.

On April 1, the same year, Esenbel became for the third time Ambassador to Washington, D.C., where he acted until July 14, 1979. After completion of his duty in the USA, he returned home and was promoted to Minister-Counselor. On August 23, 1979, Melih Esenbel retired.

== Personal life ==
Melih Esenbel died on July 27, 1995, in Istanbul. He was survived by his wife Emine and his two children. He was laid to rest at the family grave in Yahya Effendi Tekkesi graveyard.

== Bibliography ==
- Esenbel, Melih (1993). Kıbrıs: Ayağa kalkan adam, 1954-1959 (in Turkish). Ankara: Bilgi Yayınevi. p. 192. ISBN 975-4943702.

Diplomatic posts
Preceded by Suat Hayri Ürgüplü; Rıfat Turgut Menemencioğlu; Aydın Yeğen	Ambassador of Turkey to the United States; March 24, 1960-October 28, 1960; January 9, 1967-November 1, 1974; April 1, 1975-July 14, 1979	Succeeded by Bülent Uşaklıgil; Aydın Yeğen; Mustafa Şükrü Elekdağ
Preceded by Nejad Kemal Kavur	Ambassador of Turkey to Japan; January 1, 1963-January 1, 1966	Succeeded by Turgut Aytuğ
Preceded by Turan Güneş	Minister of Foreign Affairs; November 13, 1974 - March 30, 1975	Succeeded by Ahmet Gündüz Ökçün
