= Tevfik Rüştü Aras =

Turkish politician (1883–1972)

Dr. Tevfik Rüştü Aras
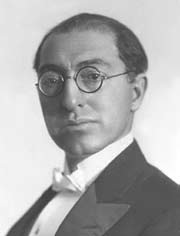
- Aras in 1930

Ambassador of Turkey to the United Kingdom
- In office 1939–1943
- President: İsmet İnönü
- Preceded by: Ali Fethi Okyar
- Succeeded by: Rauf Orbay

Minister of Foreign Affairs
- In office 4 March 1925 – 11 November 1938
- Prime Minister: İsmet İnönü, Celal Bayar
- Preceded by: Şükrü Kaya
- Succeeded by: Şükrü Saracoğlu

Personal details
- Born: Tevfik Rüştü; 11 February 1883 Çanakkale, Ottoman Empire
- Died: 5 January 1972 (aged 88) Istanbul, Turkey
- Resting place: Aşiyan Asri Cemetery
- Party: Republican People's Party (CHP)
- Education: Istanbul Erkek Lisesi
- Alma mater: Beirut School of Medicine
- Profession: Physician; politician

Tevfik Rüştü Aras (11 February 1883 – 5 January 1972) was a Turkish politician, serving as deputy and foreign minister of Turkey during the Atatürk era (1923–1938).

== Early years ==
Aras was born in 1883 in Çanakkale. He graduated from the French College of Beirut in Beirut. He served as a doctor in İzmir, Istanbul, and Thessaloniki (Turkish: Selanik ). He became a member of the Committee of Union and Progress, and during his membership he met Mustafa Kemal Atatürk, the founder of the Republic of Turkey.

In 1918, he was a member of the high commission of health (Turkish: Yüksek Sağlık Kurulu). At that time he married the journalist Evliyazade Makbule, who was the daughter of a wealthy family from İzmir.

== Political career ==
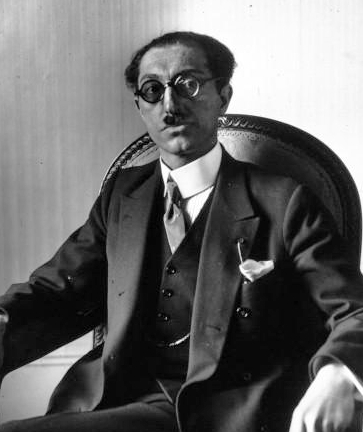
Tevfik Rüştü Aras in 1925

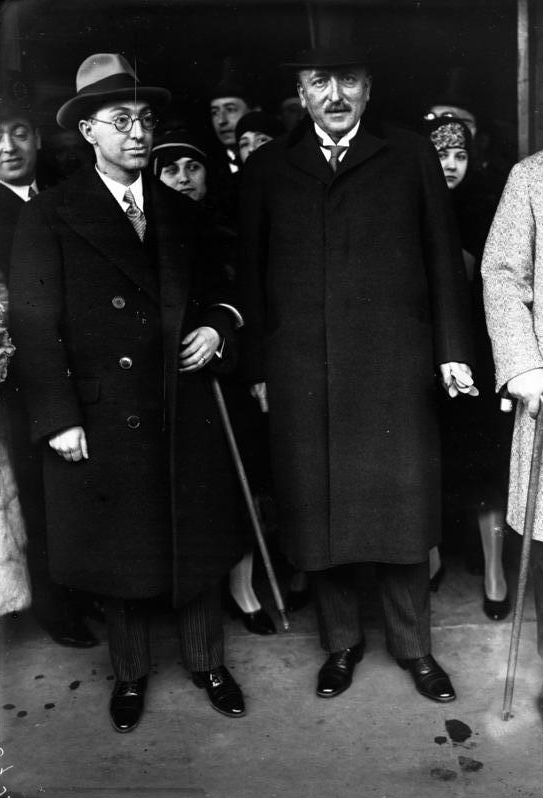
Tevfik Rüştü Aras and Carl von Schubert in Berlin

The Turkish Grand National Assembly (TGNA) was inaugurated in 1920 and Aras was elected to the parliament from Muğla. In his first period as a Member of Parliament (MP), he was appointed to the Independence Court of Kastamonu. In the autumn of 1920, he became one of the founders of the Communist Party of Turkey. Tevfik Rustu visited the Russian Soviet Federative Socialist Republic with Ali Fuat Cebesoy, when Mr. Cebesoy was appointed as ambassador to Moscow. He served as MP for İzmir in the second, third, fourth and fifth periods of TGNA, between 1923 and 1939.

When the Law on the Maintenance of Order was effected on 4 March 1925, he was the Minister of Foreign Affairs in the third İsmet İnönü government. He stayed in office by keeping his position in all the cabinets until Atatürk died. He implemented Atatürk's foreign policy, held good relations with neighbouring countries and opposition to hegemonic powers. He visited Russia three times at the invitation of Maxim Litvinov, the People's Commissar for Foreign Affairs of the Soviet Union. These visits took place in 1926 (Odessa), and in 1936 and 1937 (Moscow).

In 1933, he met with Bulgarian Prime Minister Mushanov in Plovdiv, because of the incident in Razgrad, where the Turkish cemetery was attacked. Aras claimed that the situation was stabilized and that the incident was an attempted provocation.

Aras was elected as the president of League of Nations during the Special Session of the Assembly Convened for the Purpose of Considering the Request of the Kingdom of Egypt for Admission to the League of Nations in Geneva, on 26–27 May 1937.

He was removed from his position as Foreign Minister right after Ataturk's passing away by the new Head of Republic Ismet Inonu. Aras and Inonu had different opinions in foreign affairs especially in Soviet relations, Inonu believed that Aras was more loyal to Ataturk rather than the government and conducting foreign affairs directly with him and finally Inonu had suspected Aras for lobbying against him before the Head of Republic election. This conflict prompted Aras to take his place in the opposition to Inonu, becoming a central figure in the anti-Inonu opposition bloc, next to Sukru Kaya and Celal Bayar. In 1938, Aras planned on removing Inonu from the spotlight of politics by having him appointed as Ambassador to Washington, a means of "exiling" him. In response, Inonu threatened Aras against this decision. This dispute would culminate in the appointment of Aras as Ambassador to London when Inonu became President. Aras supported the establishment of the Democratic Party (DP), but was soon dismissed by the DP following his attempt to include socialist ideas into the party program. He advocated for a conciliatory policy towards the Soviet Union to which the DP did not agree to. He then was also involved in the establishment of the New Turkey Party in 1961.

Aras was appointed ambassador to the United Kingdom in 1939 since he was removed and stayed in London for three and a half years. He retired in 1943 and published some stories in the Istanbul press (especially in the newspaper Tan). He took office as chairman of the board of Turkiye Is Bankasi, a Turkish Bank.

The speeches he gave during his ministerial period were collected in a book called "10 Years in Pursuit of Lausanne" (Turkish: Lozan'ın izlerinde 10 yıl) by Mr. Numan Menemencioglu in 1937. He also collected his stories (published in the daily press between 1945–63) into a book called My Views (Turkish: Görüşlerim).

He died on 5 January 1972 in İstanbul, and was laid to rest at the Aşiyan Asri Cemetery.

== Role in the Armenian genocide ==
Tevfik Rüştü Aras was the brother-in-law of Nazim Bey, one of the chief organizers of the Armenian genocide. Tevfik Rüştü Aras became Inspector-General of Health Services and was given the task to destroy the bodies of victims. He organized the disposal of Armenian corpses with thousands of kilos of lime over six months. The bodies were dumped into wells which were then filled with lime and sealed with soil. Tevfik Rüştü Aras was given six months to complete the task, after which he returned to Istanbul. H.W. Glockler, a British POW, wrote in his memoirs that he had seen the bodies of murdered Armenians in Urfa thrown into large ditches and covered with lime.

In 1926, following the passage of the 'Settlement Law' designed to break up Kurdish majority areas in the eastern provinces, Aras justified the deportations to the British administrator of Iraq, Sir Henry Dobbs. Dobbs recorded that the government was 'determined to clear the Kurds out of their valleys, the richest part of Turkey to-day, and to settle Turkish peasants there,' adding that the Kurds 'were to be treated as were the Armenians.' Dobbs accounts: 'The Kurds would for many generations be incapable of self-government ... He always said long before the war that Turkey must get rid of the Albanians, Bulgarians and Arabs, and must become more homogeneous.'

== Personal life ==
He had a daughter from his marriage to Evliyazade Makbule called Emel, who later married Fatin Rüştü Zorlu, the minister of foreign affairs from 1957 to 1960.

Political offices
Preceded by Şükrü Kaya	Minister of Foreign Affairs of Turkey; 4 March 1925–11 November 1938	Succeeded by Şükrü Saracoğlu
Honorary titles
Preceded by (Argentina) Carlos Saavedra Lamas	Presidents of General Assembly of League of Nations; 1937–1937	Succeeded by (India) Sir Muhammad Shah Aga Khan
