= Hayrettin Erkmen =

Turkish politician (1915–1999)

Turkish Foreign Minister
- In office 12 November 1979 – 12 September 1980
- President: Fahri Korutürk
- Preceded by: Ahmet Gündüz Ökçün
- Succeeded by: İlter Türkmen

Minister of Construction and Settlement
- In office 11 December 1979 – 27 May 1980
- President: Fahri Korutürk
- Preceded by: Medeni Berk
- Succeeded by: Orhan Kubat

Minister of Economy and Trade of Turkey
- In office 4 September 1958 – 27 May 1960
- President: Celâl Bayar
- Preceded by: Abdullah Aker
- Succeeded by: Cihat İren

Minister of Labor of Turkey
- In office 25 November 1957 – 4 September 1958
- President: Celâl Bayar
- Preceded by: Mümtaz Tarhan
- Succeeded by: Ahmet Haluk Şaman
- In office 8 April 1953 – 30 November 1955
- President: Celâl Bayar
- Preceded by: Samet Ağaoğlu
- Succeeded by: Mümtaz Tarhan

Personal details
- Born: 19 April 1915 Giresun, Ottoman Empire
- Died: 18 May 1999 (aged 84) Istanbul, Turkey
- Education: Mekteb-i Mülkiye; University of Geneva

Hayrettin Erkmen (19 April 1915 – 18 May 1999) was the minister of foreign affairs of the Republic of Turkey. He was in office from 12 November 1979 to 5 September 1980.

In 1960, Erkmen was sentenced to 10 years in prison during the Yassıada trials. He was released under an amnesty in 1964.
