= Necmettin Sadak =

Turkish politician (1890–1953)

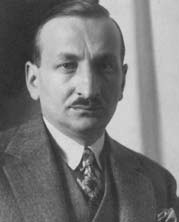

Turkish Foreign Minister
- In office 10 September 1947 – 22 May 1950
- Prime Minister: Hasan Saka; Şemsettin Günaltay
- Preceded by: Hasan Saka
- Succeeded by: Mehmet Fuat Köprülü

Personal details
- Born: 1890 Isparta, Ottoman Empire
- Died: 21 September 1953 (aged 63) New York City, United States
- Education: Galatasaray High School
- Alma mater: University of Lyon

Sadık Necmettin Sadak (1890 in Isparta, Ottoman Empire – 21 September 1953 in New York City) was a Turkish politician, former minister of Foreign Affairs of Turkey, former chairman of the Turkish sports club Galatasaray and editor-in-chief of the newspaper Akşam.

== Biography ==
After graduating from Galatasaray High School in 1910, he studied humanities in the University of Lyon, France, until 1914. After his return to Turkey, he started to work in fields of sociology. In 1918 he was one of the co-founders of the newspaper Akşam. He remained its editor-in-chief in the subsequent decades.

In 1928 he was elected to national parliament from Sivas province. He was reelected to parliament five consecutive times. He represented Turkey many times at international conferences. Between 1947 and 1950, he was the Minister of Foreign Affairs of Turkey. Sadak was also elected as the chairman of Galatasaray in 1928. Although no national football league was established in Turkey in the 1920s, Galatasaray won an Istanbul League title, while Sadak was the president.

Preceded by Hasan Saka	Minister of Foreign Affairs of Turkey; 1947–1950	Succeeded by Fuat Köprülü
