= Mümtaz Tarhan =

Turkish politician (1908–1970)

9. Minister of Labor of Turkey
- In office 9 December 1955 – 25 November 1957
- Preceded by: Hayrettin Erkmen
- Succeeded by: Hayrettin Erkmen

Mayor of Istanbul
- In office 29 November 1957 – 11 May 1958
- Preceded by: Fahrettin Kerim Gökay
- Succeeded by: Ethem Yetkiner

President of Gençlerbirliği
- In office 1967–1968
- Preceded by: Yılmaz Mete
- Succeeded by: Hadi Özbay

President of TFF
- In office 1952–1952
- Preceded by: Mehmet Arkan
- Succeeded by: Orhan Şeref Apak

Personal details
- Born: Mehmet Mümtaz Tarhan; 1908 Istanbul, Ottoman Empire
- Died: 18 January 1970 (aged 62) Istanbul, Turkey

Mümtaz Tarhan (1908 – 18 January 1970) was the governor of Istanbul from 29 November 1957 to 11 May 1958.
