= Emre Gönensay =

Turkish politician

Turkish Foreign Minister
- In office 6 March 1996 – 28 June 1996
- Prime Minister: Tansu Ciller
- Preceded by: Deniz Baykal
- Succeeded by: Tansu Çiller

Personal details
- Born: 1937 (age 88–89)
- Education: Robert College
- Alma mater: Columbia University (BA, MA); London School of Economics (PhD)

Emre Gönensay (born 1937) is a Turkish politician. He served as Minister of Foreign Affairs of Turkey in 1996 and is a member of the True Path Party.

== Biography ==
He was born in 1937. He finished his high school education at Robert College in Istanbul. He left for the United States and earned a bachelor's and master's degree from Columbia University. Then he acquired a doctorate degree from the London School of Economics. After a while he returned to Turkey and continued his career as a professor of economics at Boğaziçi University.
