= Selim Sarper =

Turkish politician

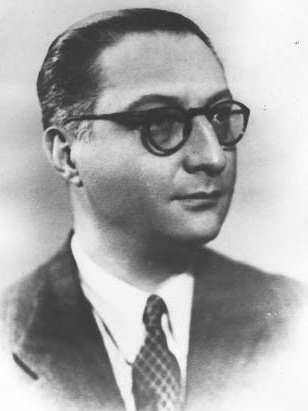

Minister of Foreign Affairs
- In office 28 May 1960 – 16 February 1962
- Prime Minister: Cemal Gürsel, Emin Fahrettin Özdilek, İsmet İnönü
- Preceded by: Fatin Rüştü Zorlu
- Succeeded by: Feridun Cemal Erkin

Personal details
- Born: 14 June 1899 Istanbul, Ottoman Empire
- Died: 11 October 1968 (aged 69) Ankara, Turkey
- Party: Republican People's Party (CHP)
- Spouse: Kamuran Sarper
- Children: Ülker (Sarper) Kural; Ayşe (Sarper) Vanlı
- Education: Robert College
- Alma mater: Humboldt University of Berlin; Ankara University, Law School
- Profession: Diplomat; politician

Selim Rauf Sarper (14 June 1899, Istanbul – 11 October 1968, Ankara) was a Turkish diplomat and politician. He served as Minister of Foreign Affairs between 1960 and 1962.

== Early years ==
Selim Sarper was born on 14 June 1899 in Istanbul. He completed his middle school education at Robert College and his high school education in Magdeburg, Germany. He then attended the University of Berlin, where he studied law. At the age of 24, The Turkish Republic was proclaimed in his home country.

Returned home, he studied at Ankara University, Law School. He then served as a teacher of French language in a high school at Adana in 1923 before he worked as a clerk at the Independence Tribunal in the early years of the Republican era. In 1927, he entered the Ministry of Foreign Affairs as a translator.

== Diplomatic career ==
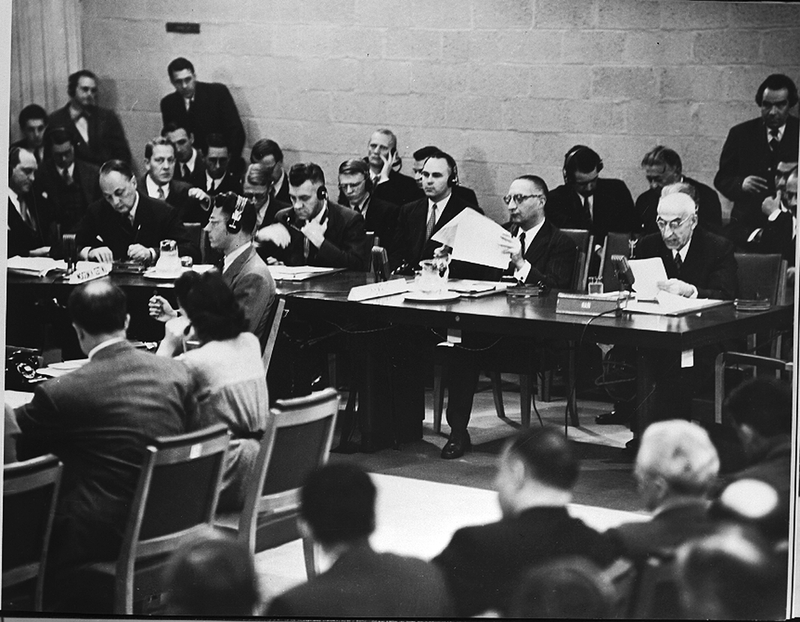
Selim Sarper (second from right at the desk) during a meeting of United Nations Security Council in New York City ca. 1951

In 1928, he was appointed vice-consul in Odessa, Soviet Union, in 1929 third secretary at the Turkish Embassy in Moscow and two years later he was promoted to the post of second secretary at the same office. His further assignments were, Consul in Komotini, Greece in 1933, Consul in Odessa in 1935, Consul in Berlin, Germany in 1937 and Ambassador in Bucharest, Romania in 1939.

In the 1940s, Sarper served as the Director of the governmental Press and Information Agency. During the World War II years, he was responsible for the administration of the official propaganda and information.

In 1944, Selim Sarper was appointed Turkey's Ambassador to Moscow, an important mission during the last years of World War II and the early years of the Cold War (1947-1991). According to President İsmet İnönü's judgement relating to a conversation between Sarper and Stalin's Minister of Foreign Affairs Molotov on 7 June 1945, Turkey, even remained neutral in the war, might have been under a territorial claim threat from the Soviet Union. Due to this context, Turkey subsequently positioned itself alongside the United States. After the related official documents in the U.S. archives were made available to the public, it became clear that Sarper reported the subject of his conversation to the U.S. Ambassador W. Averell Harriman, even before he notified his government. However, his report to Harriman does not mention any threat by the Soviet Union, and the memoirs of Molotov deny such an allegation.

In 1946, Sarper became Ambassador to Italy in Rome, in 1947 Permanent Representative of Turkey to the United Nations and in 1957 Permanent Representative of Turkey to NATO.

== Politics ==
On 28 May, the next day of the 1960 Turkish coup d'état, Selim Sarper, took United States Ambassador in Ankara Fletcher Warren to the coup leader General Cemal Gürsel for a visit. Sarper was appointed the same day Minister of Foreign Affairs replacing Fahri Korutürk in the draft cabinet list.

Sarper entered later the Republican People's Party (CHP) running for a seat in the parliament at the 1961 general elections. He continued to serve at his post as Minister of Foreign Affairs until 16 February 1962.

Revealed U.S. diplomatic documents show that during his term in the İnönü's coalition cabinet, Sarper made assessments to the U.S. Government and told high words about his own head of state like "That Gürsel was not a great brain".

In the 1965 general elections, Sarper was re-elected into the parliament as a deputy from Istanbul Province.

== Illness and death ==
On 14 May 1968 Selim Sarper underwent a lung surgery for the second time. He died on 11 October 1968 in Ankara; his body was transferred to Istanbul. He was survived by his wife Kamuran and daughters Ülker (Sarper) Kural and Ayşe (Sarper) Vanlı.

== See also ==
- American Turkish Society
- List of ambassadors of Turkey to the United Nations
- List of ministers of foreign affairs of Turkey
