= Behçet Türkmen =

Turkish soldier and Intelligence officer (1899–1968)

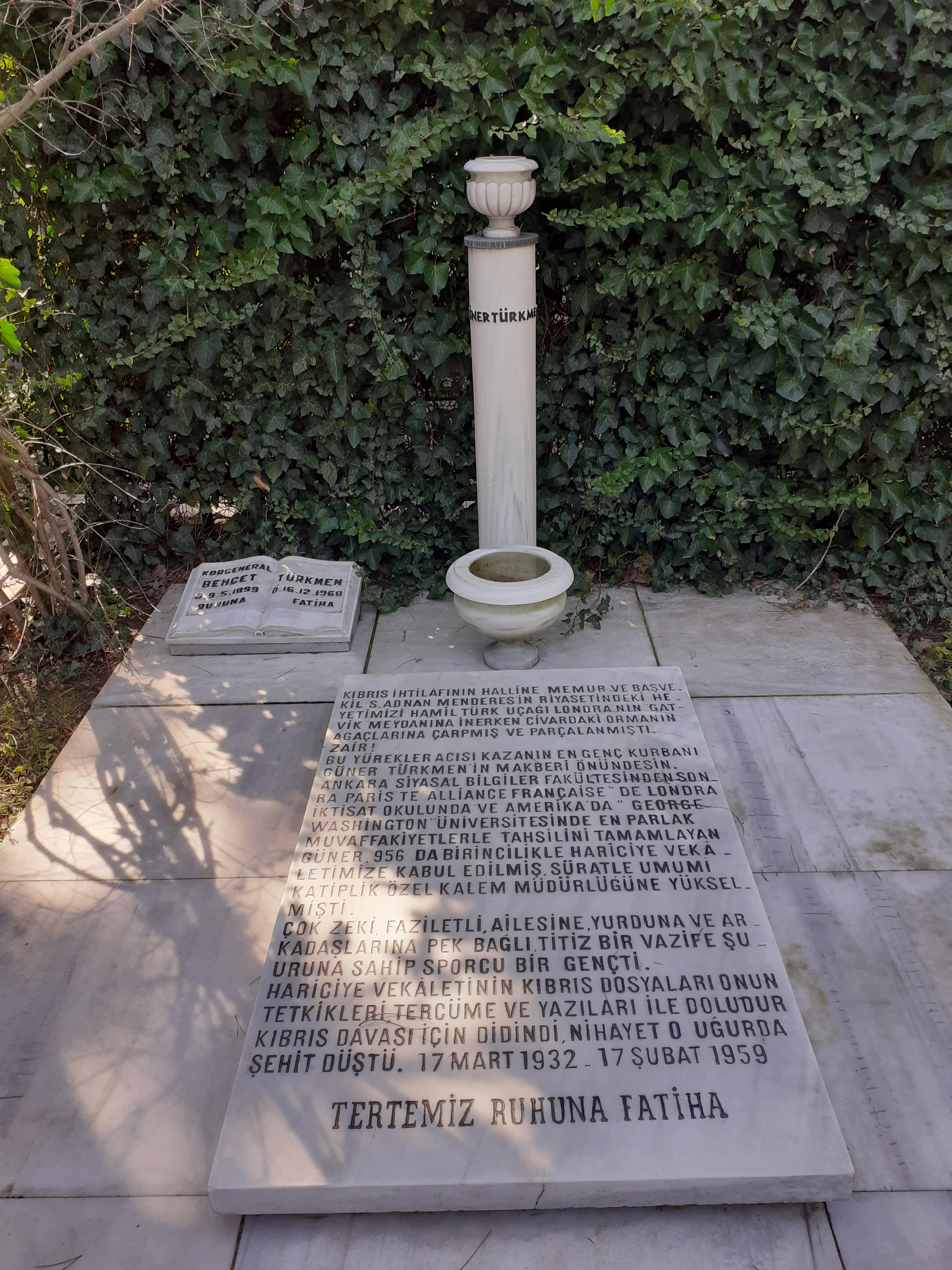
- Tomb of Behçet Türkmen

National Security Service Chief
- In office 3 September 1953 – 27 March 1957
- Preceded by: Mehmet Naci Perkel
- Succeeded by: Emin Çobanoğlu

Personal details
- Born: 9 May 1899 Bursa, Ottoman Empire
- Died: 16 December 1968 (aged 69) Istanbul, Turkey
- Children: İlter Türkmen

Military service
- Allegiance: Turkey
- Branch/service: Turkish Land Forces
- Years of service: 1933–1968
- Rank: Lieutenant general

Behçet Türkmen (9 May 1899 – 16 December 1968) was a Turkish soldier and intelligence officer.

He graduated from the Turkish Military Academy. On 1 September 1931, he was appointed chief of staff to the National Police Service Race. Later he served in the Turkish Armed Forces at various levels. He was appointed head of the National Police with the rank of major general on 3 September 1953 and remained in the post until 27 March 1957 with the rank of lieutenant general. The same year he was appointed to the Baghdad Embassy and later to the Stockholm Embassy. In the latter post he also served as non-resident ambassador of Turkey to Norway.

He was the father of İlter Türkmen, who served as the minister of foreign affairs in the cabinet led by Bülent Ulusu which was established following the 1980 coup.
