= Ahmet Gündüz Ökçün =

Turkish politician (1935–1986)

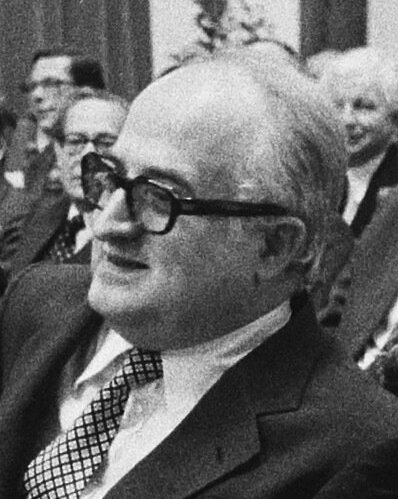

Ministry of Foreign Affairs
- In office 21 June 1977 – 21 July 1977
- Prime Minister: Bülent Ecevit
- Preceded by: İhsan Sabri Çağlayangil
- Succeeded by: İhsan Sabri Çağlayangil
- In office 5 January 1978 – 12 November 1979
- Prime Minister: Bülent Ecevit
- Preceded by: İhsan Sabri Çağlayangil
- Succeeded by: Hayrettin Erkmen

Personal details
- Born: 1935 Eskişehir, Turkey
- Died: 26 November 1986 (aged 50–51)
- Party: Republican People's Party (CHP)
- Children: 2
- Education: Political science
- Alma mater: Ankara University, Faculty of Political Sciences
- Occupation: Politician
- Profession: Academic

Ahmet Gündüz Ökçün (1935 – 26 November 1986) was a Turkish academic, diplomat and the former Minister of Foreign Affairs of Turkey.

== Biography ==
Ahmet Gündüz Ökçün was born in 1935 in Eskişehir, Turkey. He graduated from Faculty of Political Sciences of Ankara University. He served in the same faculty as an academic and later as a dean. He was married and a father of two. He died on 26 November 1986.

=== Political career ===
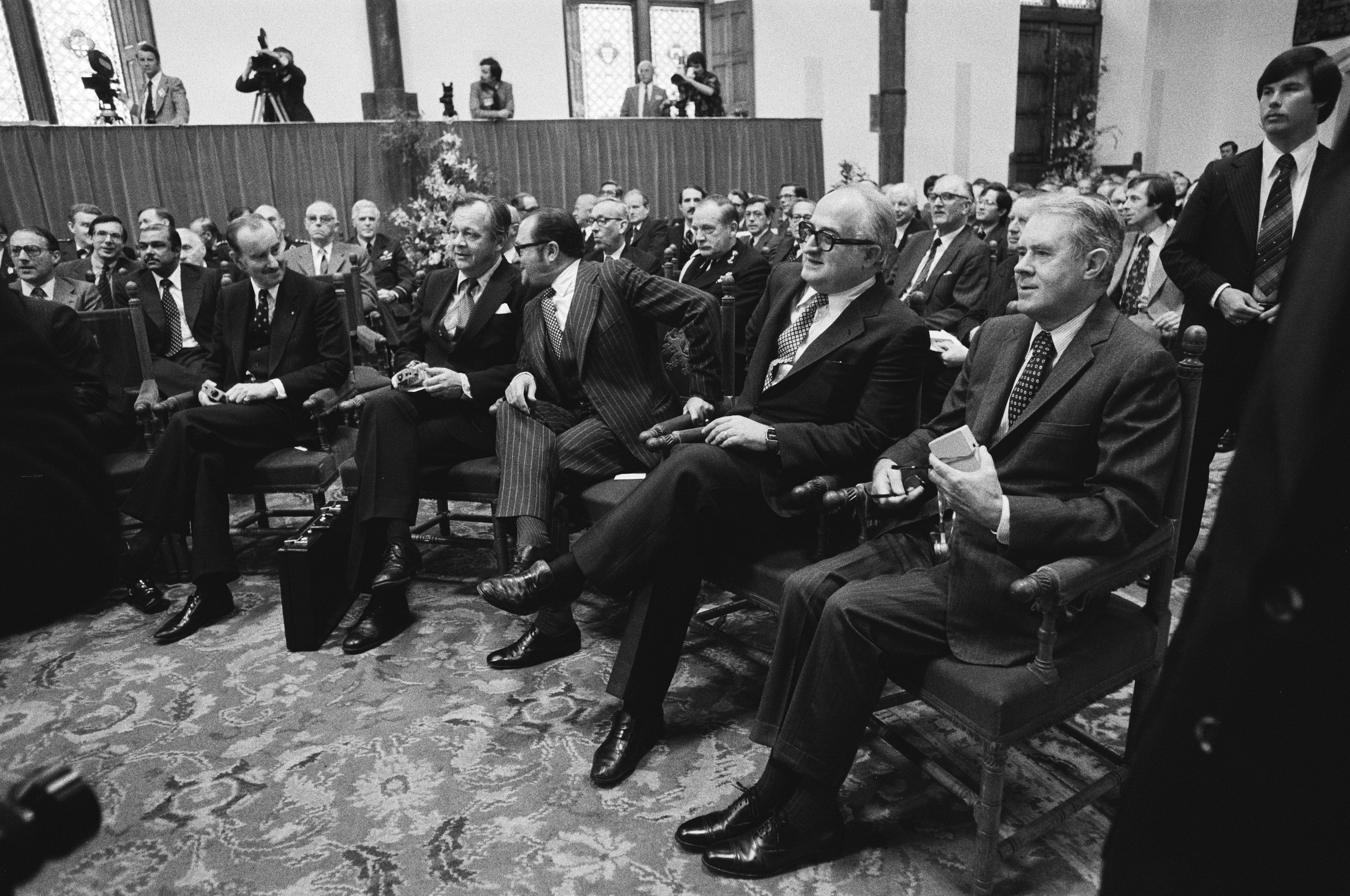
Ökçün at the opening ceremony of the NATO Council of Ministers in The Hague

Ökçün joined the Republican People's Party (CHP), and was elected as a deputy in the general election held on 5 June 1977 from Eskişehir Province. He was appointed the Minister of Foreign Affairs on 21 June 1977 in the 40th government. As the government failed to receive the vote of confidence, his mission in the ministry ended into just one month. However, the 42nd government of Turkey in the next year, which could receive the vote of confidence, he was able to resume the same post, and served between 5 January 1978 and 12 November 1979.
