= Osman Esim Olcay =

Turkish politician

Osman Esim Olcay (17 January 1924 – 12 September 2010) was a Turkish diplomat, ambassador and Minister of Foreign Affairs.

== Biography ==
He was born on 17 January 1924 in Istanbul. He completed Lycée Saint-Joseph in Istanbul and the Faculty of Political Sciences of Ankara University.

He began his diplomatic career in the Ministry of Foreign Affairs in 1947. He was the ambassador to Helsinki in 1964 and to New Delhi in 1966. In 1969 he was the vice secretary general of NATO.

During the 33rd government of Turkey between 26 March 1971 and 11 December 1971 he was appointed minister of foreign affairs. After his political mission he returned to diplomacy. In 1972 he became the Permanent Representative of Turkey to the United Nations and in 1978 he represented Turkey in NATO.

He died on 12 September 2010 in Ankara and was laid to rest in Cebeci Asri Cemetery.
