= Feridun Cemal Erkin =

Turkish diplomat and politician (1899–1980)

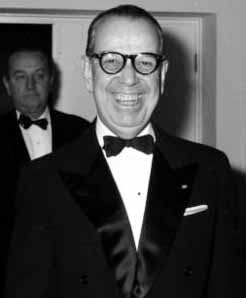
- Erkin in Bonn during a state visit while serving as the minister of foreign affairs

Minister of Foreign Affairs
- In office 1 April 1962 – 20 February 1965
- President: Cemal Gürsel
- Prime Minister: İsmet İnönü
- Preceded by: Selim Sarper
- Succeeded by: Hasan Esat Işık

Personal details
- Born: 1899 Istanbul
- Died: 21 June 1980 (aged 80–81)
- Party: Republican People's Party; Justice Party
- Education: Galatasaray High School; University of Paris

Feridun Cemal Erkin (1899–1980) was a Turkish diplomat and politician. He was the minister of foreign affairs between 1962 and 1965. He served as the ambassador of Turkey in various countries, including Italy, the United States of America, Spain, France and the United Kingdom.

== Early life and education ==
Feridun Cemal was born in İstanbul in 1899. His father was Mehmet Cemal Bey, one of the directors of the Ottoman Public Debt Administration, and his mother was Nesibe Hanım. He had two brothers, one of who was Ulvi Cemal, a composer.

Feridun Cemal graduated from Galatasaray High School in 1920. He received a degree in law from the University of Paris in 1925. Between 1916 and 1918 he completed his military service.

== Career ==
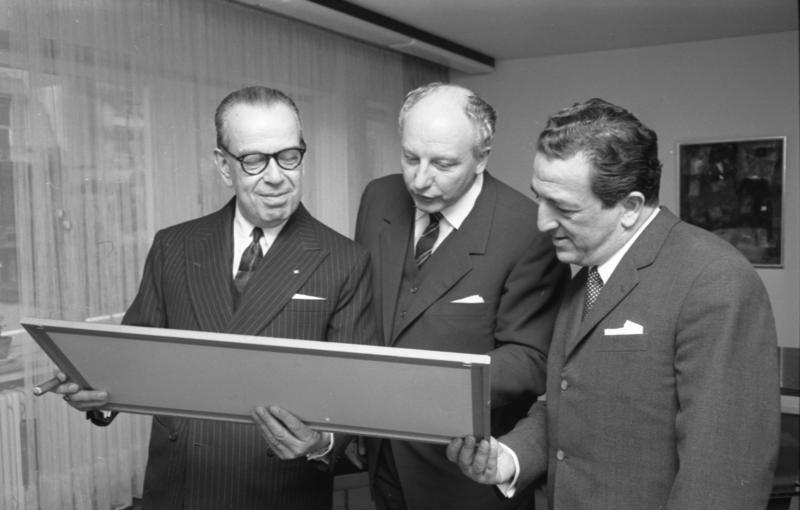
Erkin (left) with Walter Scheel (middle), future President of West Germany in 1964

Erkin worked as a deputy accountant in İstanbul public administration in 1920. He was the chief secretary of the population exchange commission in 1926. He was appointed to his first diplomatic post in 1928 as the first secretary in the Turkish embassy in London. After serving at the Turkish Ministry of Foreign Affairs in various capacities he was named as the envoy extraordinary in the Turkish embassy in Berlin 1934. Erkin became consul general in Berlin in 1938. During World War II he headed a commission of the Republic of Turkey which was formed to assist Greece when it was attacked by the Nazi forces and was the undersecretary of the Ministry of Foreign Affairs.

Erkin was named as the ambassador of Turkey to Italy in 1947. He served in the post for one year and became the ambassador of Turkey to the United States in 1948. Erkin's tenure ended in 1955 when he was appointed as ambassador of Turkey to Spain. Next he was named as the ambassador of Turkey to France in 1957 which he held until 1960. He served as the ambassador of Turkey to the United Kingdom between 1960 and 1962.

Erkin was appointed minister of foreign affairs on 1 April 1962, replacing Selim Sarper in the post. Erkin was in office until 20 February 1965. One of the most significant visits of him as the minister of foreign affairs was to the Soviet Union in November 1964. Because it was the first visit of a Turkish minister to the Soviet Union since 1940. Erkin served in the cabinets led by Prime Minister İsmet İnönü.

Then Erkin was elected as a deputy from the Republican People's Party representing Ordu. He left the party and joined the Justice Party. In 1970 Erkin was elected as senator.

== Death ==
Erkin died on 21 June 1980.

=== Work and legacy ===
In 1968 Erkin published a book, Türk Sovyet İlişkileri ve Boğazlar Meselesi, (Turkish: Turkey Soviet Union Relations and the Straits Question). His memoir was published by the Turkish Historical Society in 1994 with the title Dışişlerinde 34 Yıl: Anılar-Yorumlar (Turkish: 34 Years at the Ministry of Foreign Affairs: Memories–comments).

== Awards ==
Erkin was awarded by Greece the Order of the Phoenix due to his activities as the head of Turkish aid commission during World War II.
