= Ahmet Muhtar Mollaoğlu =

Turkish politician (1870–1934)

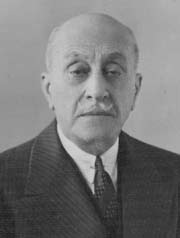

Member of the Grand National Assembly

Personal details
- Born: 1870 Çanakkale, Ottoman Empire
- Died: 1934 (aged 63–64) Istanbul, Turkey
- Education: Mekteb-i Mülkiye; Istanbul University

Ahmet Muhtar Mollaoğlu (1870–1934) was a Turkish diplomat and politician, who was the first ambassador of Turkey to the United States.

He was born to Cemaleddin Effendi, an official at the court of Abdul Hamid II, the sultan of the Ottoman Empire. He was raised with French as a secondary language beside Turkish. He did not have an education which prepared him for a diplomatic career, but he had much self-taught experience in the field with time. He was assigned to work in the lower ranks of the diplomatic service from 1898 to 1906 abroad and after the Young Turk Revolution he has been appointed as the Consul General in Budapest, Hungary. In 1911 he also took up activities in the Embassy of Vienna, Austria. The next year, in 1912, he was given the post of an Ottoman diplomat to Greece in Athens. During World War I, he at times wasn't receiving his full salary and after the United States entered the war, he was skeptical to the discussed suspension of the diplomatic relations to the USA. Even though his advice wasn't followed, he made a strong impression and was assigned as a diplomat to Kiev in 1918. His assignment was not to his pleasure and he terminated his stay in Kiev in 1919. In the same year he was elected a deputy of the Ottoman Parliament representing Constantinople.

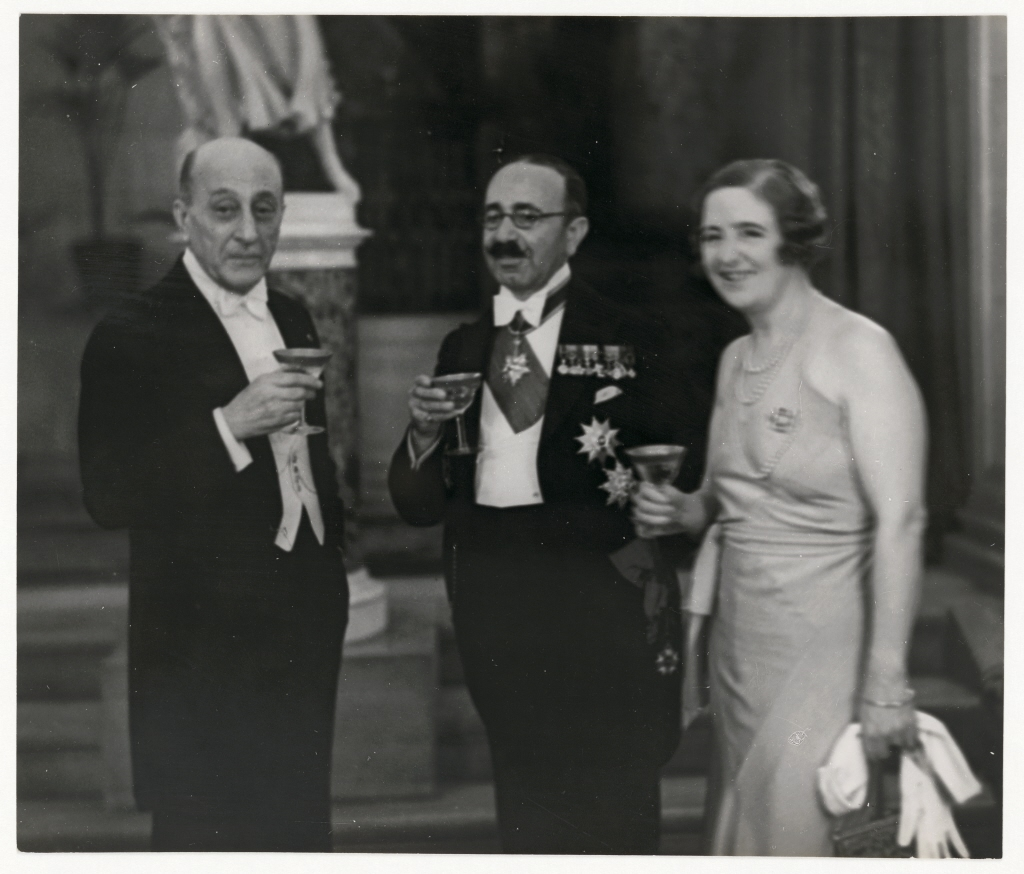
Turkish ambassador Ahmet Muhtar Mollaoğlu (on the left) at the Egyptian Embassy in Washington D.C.
