= Israel–Turkey relations =

- Israel: Turkey

Diplomatic mission
- Embassy of Israel, Ankara: Embassy of Turkey, Tel Aviv

Envoy
- Ambassador Irit Lillian: Ambassador Şakir Özkan Torunlar

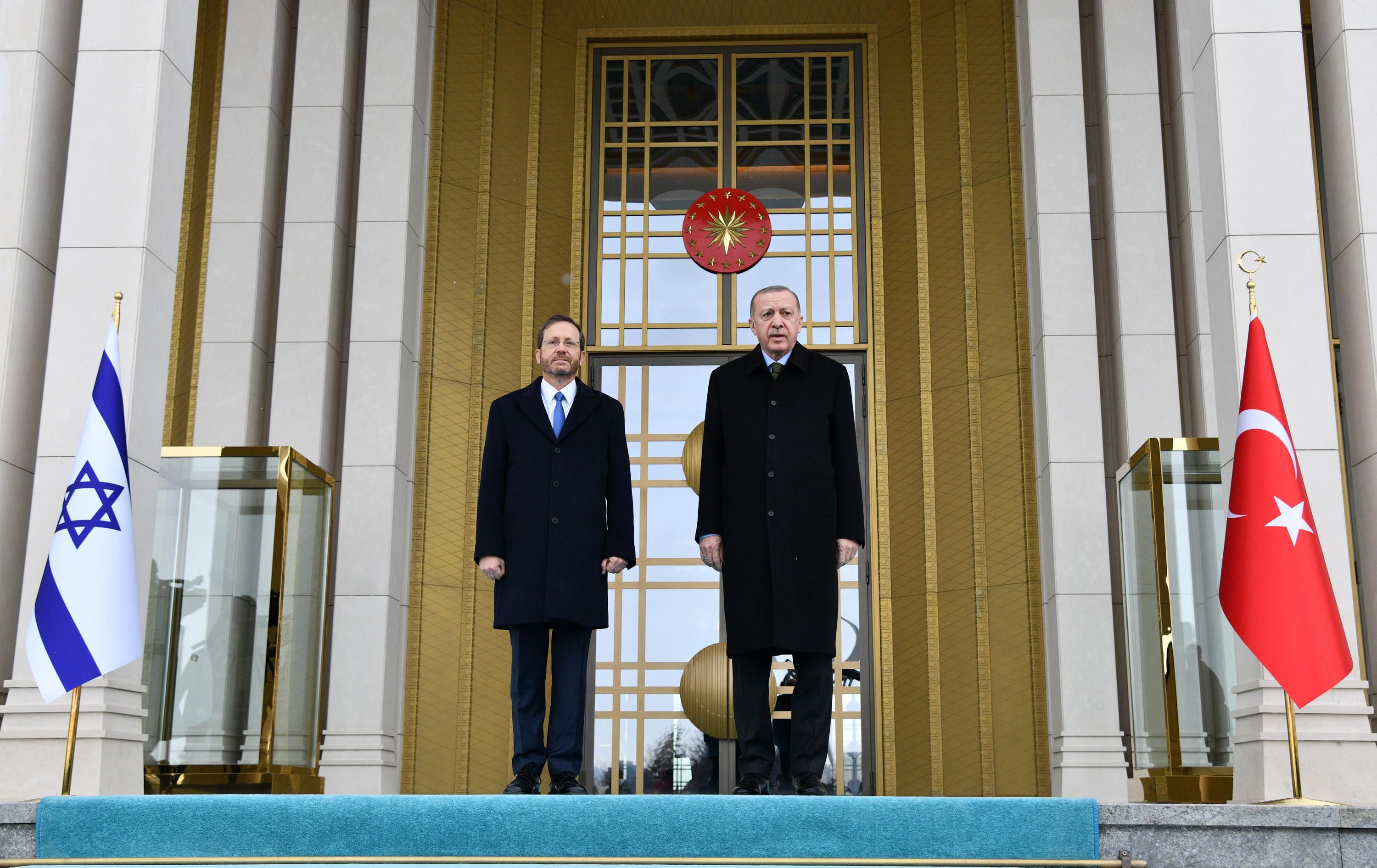
President Isaac Herzog during his state visit to Turkey with Recep Tayyip Erdoğan, March 2022

The State of Israel and Turkey formally established diplomatic relations in March 1949. Less than a year after the Israeli Declaration of Independence, Turkey recognized Israeli sovereignty, making it the world's first Muslim-majority country to do so. Both countries gave high priority to bilateral cooperation in the areas of diplomacy and military/strategic ties, while sharing concerns with respect to the regional instabilities in the Middle East.

In recent decades, particularly under Turkey's Erdoğan administration, the two countries' relationship with each other has deteriorated considerably. Diplomatic ties were reinstated after a normalization initiative in mid-2022. Relations soured again after the October 7 attacks and Gaza war, with Turkey condemning Israel and backing Hamas. On 13 November 2024, Erdoğan announced his intention to sever Turkey's relations with Israel. The states maintain diplomatic relations as of August 2026.

== Overview ==
In 1999, The New York Times reported that the strategic partnership between Turkey and Israel had the potential to alter Middle East politics: Trade and tourism were booming, the Israel Air Force practiced maneuvers in Turkish airspace and Israeli technicians were modernizing Turkish combat jets. There were also plans for high-tech cooperation and water sharing.

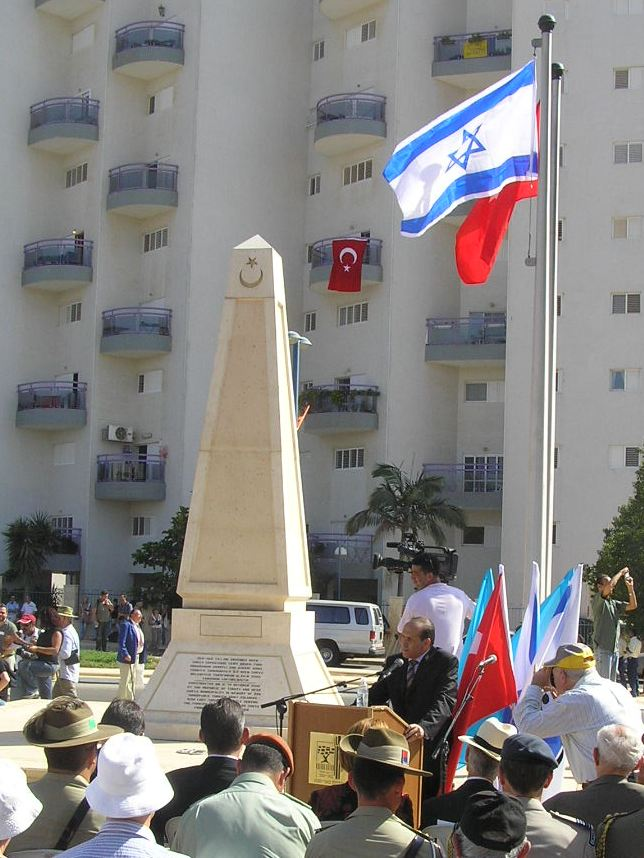
Ceremony at the Turkish Soldiers Monument in Beersheba commemorating fallen Ottoman soldiers

Recep Tayyip Erdoğan paid an official visit to Israel in 2005 and said he hoped to play a role in the Israeli–Palestinian conflict. Relations deteriorated after the 2008–09 Gaza War and the 2010 Gaza flotilla raid. In March 2013, Israel apologized for the raid, opening a path for normalized relations. Alleged Turkish involvement in exposure of Israeli special agents in Iran in October 2013 created further tension. In December 2015, Turkey and Israel held a secret meeting to negotiate restoration of diplomatic relations. They reached an agreement on 27 June 2016 to start normalizing ties.

In December 2017, Erdoğan threatened to break off ties again, this time due to United States recognition of Jerusalem as the capital of Israel.

== History ==
=== Ottoman policy towards Jews ===
Under Sultan Bayezid II, the Ottoman Empire was welcoming and supportive of Jewish refugees. As a result, the Jews were fiercely loyal to the Ottoman Empire during the anti-Ottoman rebellions in the Balkans and fled to regions under its jurisdiction when persecution intensified against Jews in Russian Empire and Western Europe. Zionist leader Theodor Herzl even asked then-Ottoman Sultan, Abdul Hamid II, to acquire Palestine and fulfil the promise of returning to Zion.

With the rise of Turkish nationalism in late 19th century, Jews started to bear pressure, as the Young Turks government were determined to Turkify all non-Turk subjects, including Jews. Eventually, with the outbreak of World War I, the Ottoman Empire had begun losing its tolerance toward Jews, and openly demonstrated systematic oppression and deportation on the Jewish subjects, accusing them of collaborating with the British Empire. Many Jews were also either suspected to be Russian agents, since most Jews migrated to Palestine were from Russia at the time, despite various figures like David Ben-Gurion and Yitzhak Ben-Zvi sought to ally with Turkey, eventually led to deportation and repression on Jews intensified. The hostility against Ottoman Empire among Jews increased leading to the establishment of Nili, a Jewish espionage spy network fighting the Ottomans, but they were exposed in 1917 and only escaped from the genocide that Ottoman Armenians, Greeks and Assyrians endured due to political intervention from Germany and Vatican. Despite this, the Tel Aviv and Jaffa deportation, issued by Djemal Pasha in 1917 in retaliation to the Jewish spy ring, was the final string of this hostility, during which thousands of Jews were killed, has continued to weigh influence on the modern Israeli–Turkish relations as well as Israel's relations with Turkic world.

== Diplomacy timeline ==
=== Initial contact ===
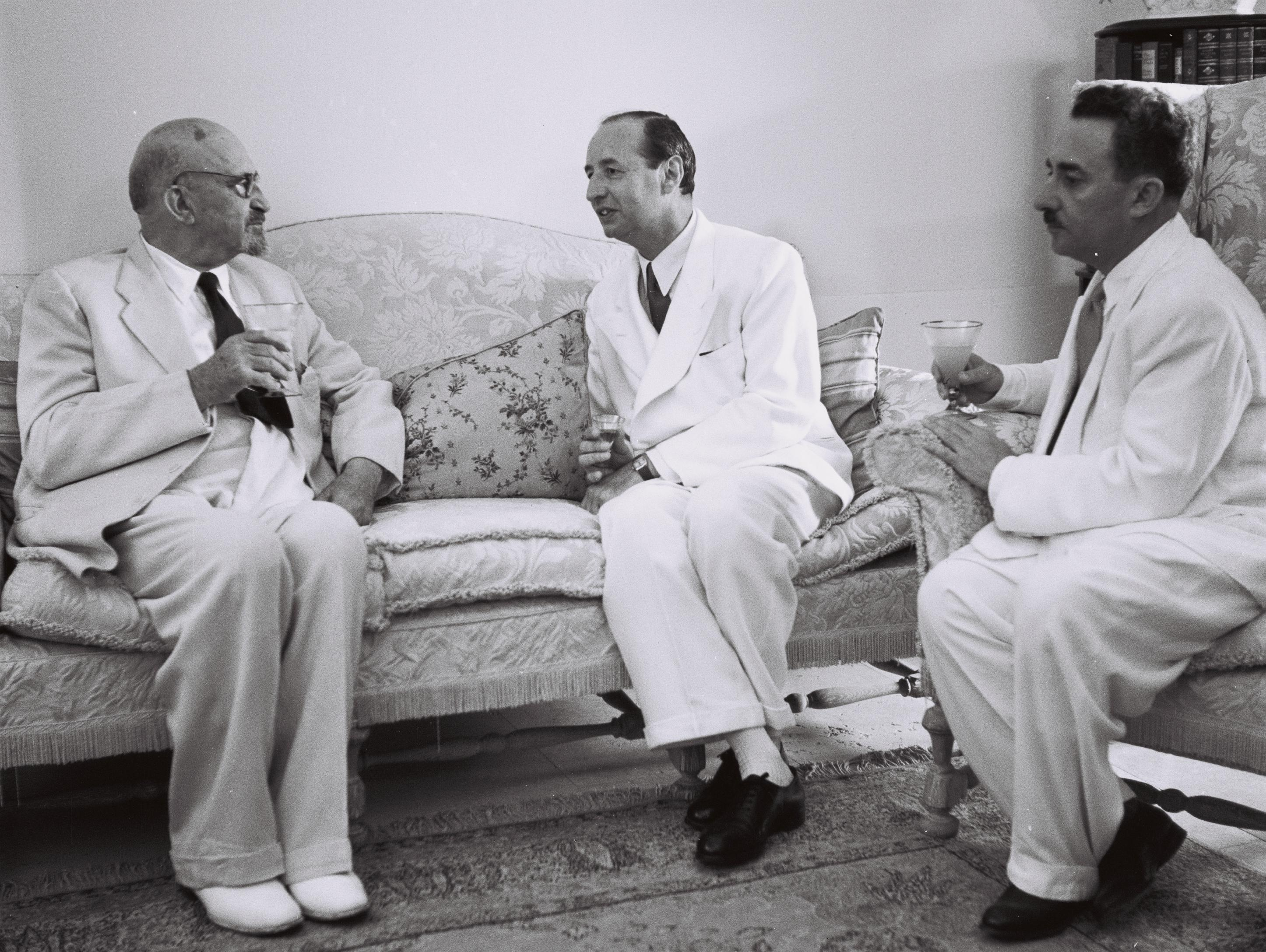
Chaim Weizmann, Seyfullah Esin and Moshe Sharett, 1950

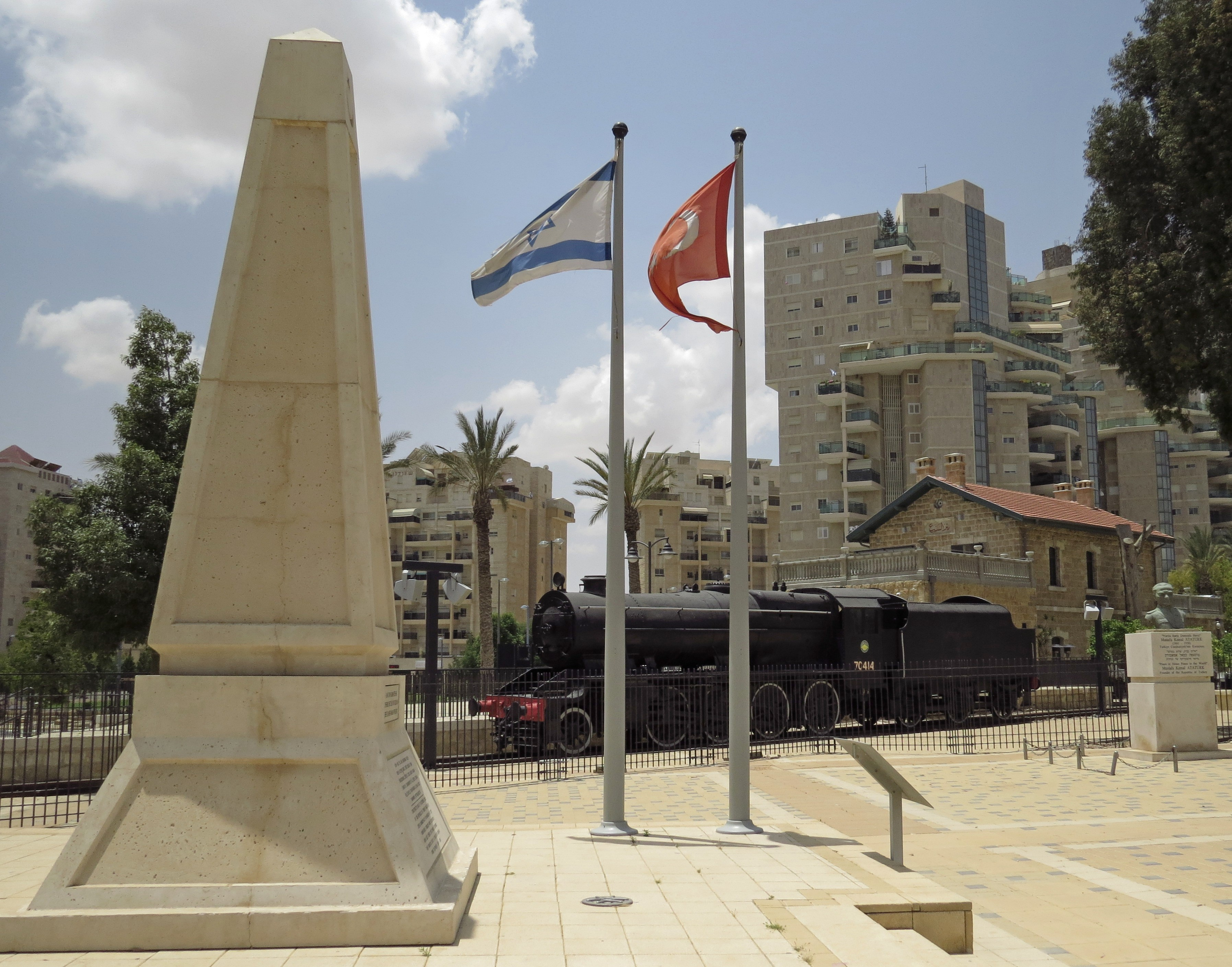
The Turkish Soldiers Monument and Atatürk memorial in the Beersheba Turkish railway station

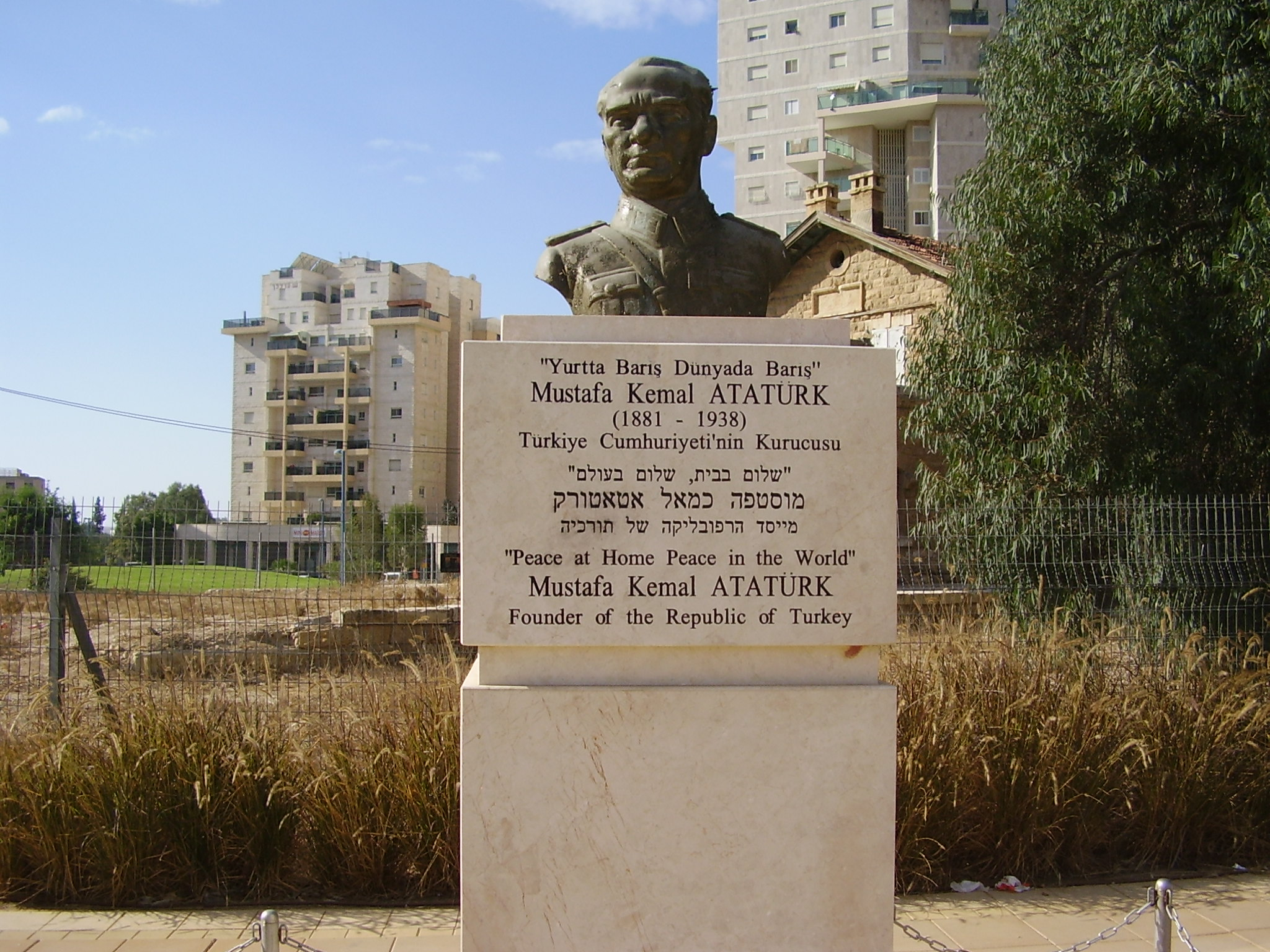
Atatürk memorial next to the Turkish Soldiers Monument in Beersheba

Turkey voted against the United Nations Partition Plan for Palestine. It recognized the State of Israel in 1949. Turkey's first diplomatic mission in Israel was a "Legation" and was officially inaugurated on 7 January 1950 and the first Turkish Chief of Mission, Seyfullah Esin presented his credentials to Chaim Weizmann, President of Israel. The Turkish Legation was downgraded to the level of "Charge d’Affaires" after the Suez Canal Crisis on 26 November 1956.

In 1958, Israeli prime minister David Ben-Gurion and Turkish prime minister Adnan Menderes met secretly to discuss a "peripheral pact" which included public-relations campaigns, exchange of intelligence information and military support. In 1967, Turkey joined the Arab condemnation of Israel after the Six-Day War and called for Israel's withdrawal from the occupied territories but abstained from voting in favor of a clause referring to Israel as an "aggressor state." At a meeting of the Organization of the Islamic Conference in Rabat, Morocco, Turkey opposed a resolution calling for severing diplomatic relations with Israel.

As a result of positive developments in bilateral ties, the Turkish mission in Tel-Aviv was upgraded back to the level of "Legation" in July 1963 and further upgraded to the level of "Embassy" as of January 1980.

Upon Israel's annexation of East Jerusalem and enunciation of Jerusalem as its eternal capital, the representation was relegated to the level of "Second Secretary" on 30 November 1980.

=== During the 1990s ===
The positive atmosphere in the Israeli–Palestinian peace process in the early 1990s made it possible to raise the mutual diplomatic relations once again to Ambassadorial level and a Turkish Ambassador presented his credentials to President Chaim Herzog, on 23 March 1992, in Tel Aviv.

Israel has maintained two diplomatic missions in Turkey: its embassy is located in the capital city of Ankara, and its Consulate General is located in Turkey's largest city, Istanbul. Until the recent downgrading in relations, the Israeli ambassador to Turkey was Gabby Levy, and the Israeli consul-general was Mordechai Amihai. These missions are responsible for Israeli consular affairs for the Marmara, Aegean, Eastern Thrace and western part of the Black Sea regions of Turkey.

=== Post-AKP ascendancy ===
In Turkey's 2002 election, the Justice and Development Party, also known as AKP, won a landslide victory. Prime minister Recep Tayyip Erdoğan visited Israel in 2005 offering to serve as a Middle East peace mediator and looking to build up trade and military ties. Erdoğan brought a large group of businessmen on his two-day trip, which included talks with Prime Minister Ariel Sharon and President Moshe Katsav. Erdoğan also laid a wreath at the Holocaust memorial, Yad Vashem. Erdoğan told Sharon that his Justice and Development Party regarded anti-Semitism as "a crime against humanity". He added that Iran's nuclear ambitions were a threat not just to Israel but to "the entire world".

In early 2006, the Israeli Foreign Ministry described its country's relations with Turkey as "perfect". A joint Israeli-Palestinian industrial park was being developed under Turkey's aegis. Israeli President Shimon Peres and Palestinian Authority President Mahmoud Abbas addressed the Grand National Assembly of Turkey a day apart. Peres described Turkey as an "important player in the Middle East in relation to the United States, Syria and the Palestinians, as well as us". According to a report in the Jerusalem Post, a spokeswoman for the Syrian Foreign Ministry said that Turkey was serving as a "channel of communication" between Syria and Israel.

On a three-day visit to Ankara in November 2007, Peres met with Turkish President Abdullah Gül and addressed the Grand National Assembly of Turkey. Gül promised to help free three abducted Israeli soldiers: Gilad Shalit, Ehud Goldwasser and Eldad Regev.

==== Diplomatic spats ====
The Turkish government's condemnation of the 2008–2009 Israel–Gaza conflict strained relations between the two countries. In December 1987, Turkey had already declared support for the Palestinians' right to self-determination. In 2004, Turkey had denounced Israeli assassination of Sheikh Ahmed Yassin. It described Israeli policy in the Gaza Strip as "state-sponsored terrorism". There were demonstrations across Turkey against Israeli actions in Gaza.

On 5 March 2009, the Israeli daily newspaper Haaretz reported that "secret reconciliation talks at the highest level" had been held to get the Israeli-Turkish relations back on track. This report was cited in the Turkish press.

On 11 October 2009, a military aerial exercise was to consist of Turkey, Israel, the United States, and Italy. However, Turkey barred Israel from the Anatolian Eagle military exercise.

In October 2009, following Turkey's banning Israel's participation in the Anatolian Eagle military exercise, Israeli Prime Minister Benjamin Netanyahu objected to Turkey as a mediator, stating "Turkey can't be [an] honest broker", between Syria and Israel.

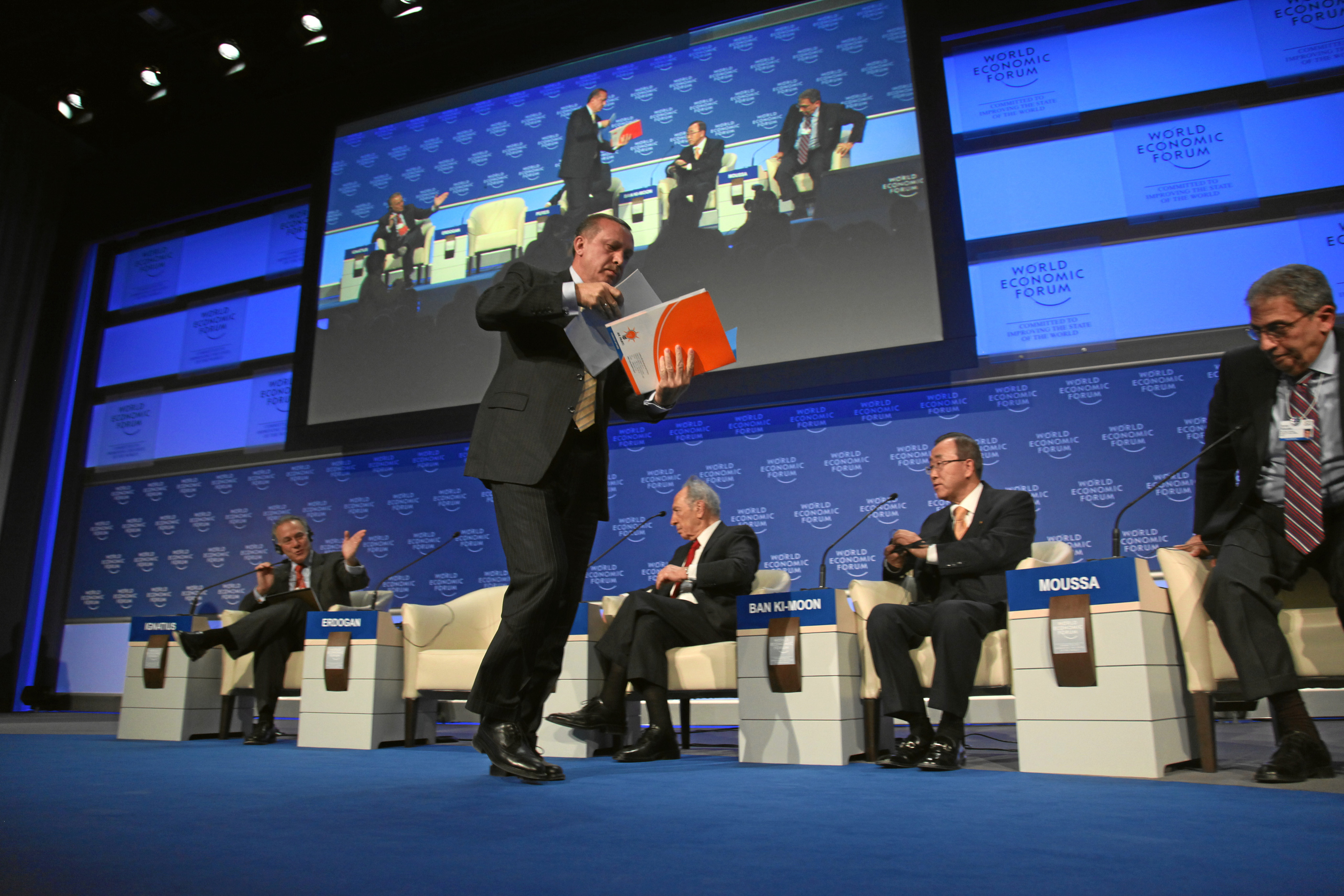
Turkey's Prime Minister Recep Tayyip Erdoğan criticizes Israeli policy and leaves the World Economic Forum in Davos, Switzerland

Erdoğan harshly criticized Israel's conduct in Gaza at the World Economic Forum conference in Davos, Switzerland in January 2009. After the assembled audience applauded Peres, Erdoğan said: "I find it very sad that people applaud what you said. You killed people. And I think that it is very wrong." The moderator, Washington Post columnist David Ignatius asked Erdoğan to finish, saying that people needed to go to dinner. Erdoğan complained about the fact, that he was given 12 minutes to talk, whereas Peres talked for a duration of 25 minutes. Erdoğan then proceeded to leave the stage.

In October 2009, Ayrılık, a prime-time serial on Turkish state television channel TRT 1 featured fictionalized scenes of Israeli soldiers shooting Palestinian children and mistreating elderly Arabs. Israeli Foreign Minister Avigdor Lieberman criticized the program, and rebuked the Turkish Ambassador in front of assembled media. Lieberman subsequently apologized after Turkey threatened to withdraw its ambassador.

After Hamas leader Khaled Mashal paid an official visit to Turkey, relations began to cool off. In January 2010, Israel protested when an episode ("Ambush") of the Turkish soap opera Valley of the Wolves depicted Israeli intelligence spying inside Turkey and kidnapping Turkish babies. The series depicted a fictional Mossad attack on the Turkish embassy in Tel Aviv in which the ambassador and his family are taken hostage. On 11 January 2010, Israeli Deputy Foreign Minister Danny Ayalon met with Turkish ambassador Ahmet Oğuz Çelikkol, who was seated on a stool that was lower than Ayalon's. Ayalon allegedly turned to his aide and quipped, "The main thing is that you see that he is seated low and that we are high ... that there is one flag on the table (the Israeli flag) and that we are not smiling."

Moshe Ya'alon, Israel's Minister of Strategic Affairs, accused Turkey of cooperating with Hamas and Iran. According to the Shin Bet, Hamas established a command post in Turkey and has used it to recruit operatives and oversee operations in the Middle East. David Ignatius has reported that in 2012, Turkey revealed the names of Mossad agents to Iran.

==== 2010 Gaza flotilla raid ====
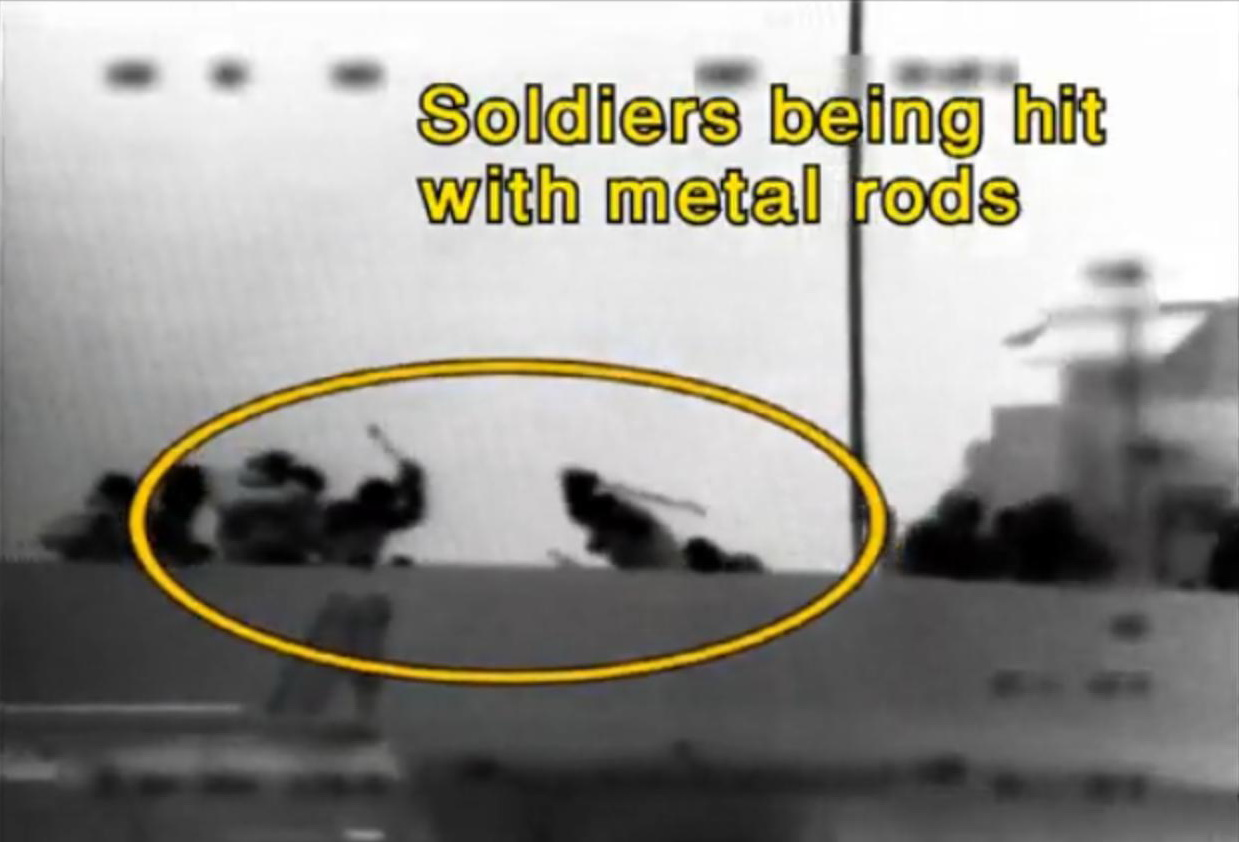
IDF photo-Pro-Palestinian activists aboard the MV Mavi Marmara; nine of them were killed by the IDF.

On 31 May 2010, nine activists (eight Turkish citizens and one Turkish-American with dual citizenship) were killed and many more wounded by Israeli troops and seven Israeli soldiers were injured on the Mavi Marmara, part of the "Gaza Freedom Flotilla", a convoy of six ships carrying 663 people from 37 nations, including pro-Palestinian activists. Following the raid, which took place in the Mediterranean Sea in international waters, tension between the two countries mounted. One of the ships taking part was flying a Turkish flag. Turkish Prime Minister Erdoğan described the raid as "state terrorism". Turkey recalled its ambassador from Israel, and summoned the Israeli ambassador to demand an explanation. The Turkish Foreign Ministry stated that the incident could lead to irreparable consequences in bilateral relations.

On 2 September 2011, Turkey downgraded diplomatic ties with Israel and suspended military co-operation after the UN released its report of the Mavi Marmara raid. A statement from the Israeli prime minister's office said, "Israel hopes to find a way to overcome the dispute and will continue to work towards this goal". Turkey demanded an Israeli apology and compensation over 31 May 2010 incident aboard the Mavi Marmara in which eight Turkish nationals and an American man of Turkish descent died when the vessel was stormed by Israeli commandos. The Israeli government refused to give one.

In September 2011, Turkey expelled Israel's ambassador after a UN report found that the blockade of Gaza was legal according to international law although excessive force was used when boarding the ship. Israeli officials stated that they hoped to restore ties but said that they would not apologize. Hamas praised Turkey's decision.

Kemal Kılıçdaroğlu, Turkey's opposition leader, condemned the downgrade in relations with Israel, stating "No good can come of it and there is no need for us to risk our interest with petty action." Faruk Logoglu, a deputy chairman of the opposition Republican People's Party, criticized Erdoğan, stating that "The probability that (Turkey's ruling) party has carried Turkey to the brink of a hot conflict is saddening and unacceptable." Alon Liel, a former Israeli ambassador to Turkey, stated that it was unlikely that Turkish forces would penetrate Israeli waters, but speculated that Turkey might to disrupt future Israeli gas exports to Cyprus and warned of a new Turkish-Egyptian alliance that could isolate Israel in the Mediterranean.

Israeli Defense Minister Ehud Barak predicted that the rift would pass in time. At the U.N. General Assembly in September 2011, U.S. President Barack Obama asked Erdoğan to resolve the crisis with Israel.

==== Deterioration of ties ====
The Turkish Foreign Ministry called on the international community and the United Nations to take the necessary initiatives to stop Israel's military operation in Gaza on late 2012, which it described as another example of Israel's hostile policies. Turkish Foreign Minister Ahmet Davutoğlu see in this attack another of Israel's "crimes of humanity". Turkish Prime Minister Recep Tayyip Erdoğan accused the United Nations on 19 November of failing to act over the deadly Israeli air bombardments of Gaza, calling Israel a "terrorist state" that "massacres innocent children".

During his speech in Vienna on 1 March 2013 at a United Nations event, Turkish Prime minister Recep Tayyip Erdoğan devoted to dialogue between the West and Islam, decrying the rising racism in Europe and the fact that many Muslims "who live in countries other than their own" often face harsh discrimination. Erdoğan described Zionism as "a crime against humanity" saying, "It is necessary that we must consider—just like Zionism, or anti-Semitism, or fascism—Islamophobia." In an interview to the Euronews, Shimon Peres argued that Erdoğan's statements are based on ignorance and they raise the flames of hatred. On 20 March, Erdoğan began an official visit to Denmark with an effort to clarify his remarks he made on 27 February at a UN conference in Vienna referring to Zionism as a crime against humanity. "Let no one misunderstand what I said. Everyone knows that my criticism [of Israel] focuses on some critical issues. It's directed especially toward Israeli policies on Gaza," Erdoğan said in an interview with Politiken, a Danish newspaper. Erdoğan claimed his February comments were not anti-Semitic but rather a criticism of Israel's policies.

==== Reconciliation attempts ====
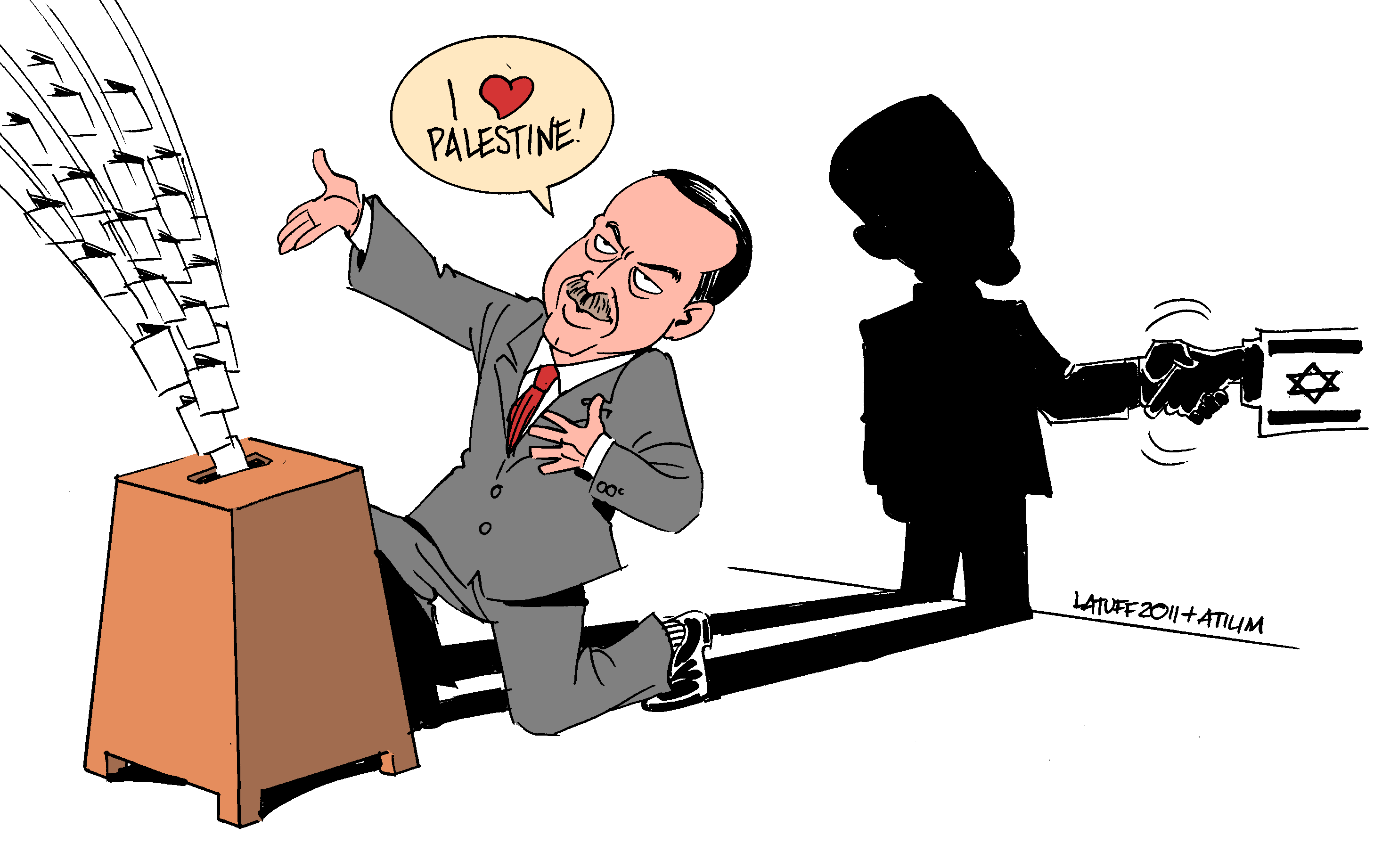
Carlos Latuff's caricature on Erdoğan's Israel and Palestine policy

On 22 March 2013, Netanyahu called Erdoğan and apologized for the Gaza Flotilla incident. In an official statement the Israeli government expressed regret over deterioration in bilateral relations and described the incident as unintentional, regretful and marred by "operational errors". Erdoğan later issued a statement accepting the apology on behalf of the Turkish people. Israel also said it would compensate the victims' families. Israel initially declared that the countries had agreed to restore normal diplomatic relations, including the return of ambassadors and cancellation of Turkish legal proceedings in absentia against Israeli troops involved in the raid, but this statement was later omitted.

U.S. President Barack Obama, whose visit to Israel coincided with these events and was credited with brokering the reconciliation, said that the U.S. "attached great importance to the restoration of positive relations between [Israel and Turkey] in order to advance regional peace and security".

==== Further tension ====
In August 2013, Erdoğan told AKP's provincial chairs that Israel was responsible for the July 2013 overthrow of Mohamed Morsi in Egypt. He based this claim on a video posted by Tzipi Livni speaking to French intellectual Bernard-Henri Levy during which Levy said: "The Muslim Brotherhood will not be in power even if they win the elections, because democracy is not the ballot box." According to Hürriyet, Levy actually said: "If the Muslim Brotherhood arrives in Egypt, I will not say democracy wants it, so let democracy progress. Democracy is not only elections, it is also values...I will urge the prevention of [the Muslim Brotherhood] coming to power, but by all sorts of means."

The Israeli Foreign Ministry stated that Erdoğan's accusation was "a statement well worth not commenting on". Egypt's interim government rejected Erdoğan's claim, describing it as "baseless", "very bewildering", and charged that "its purpose [was] to strike at the unity of Egyptians".

With the scandal over alleged Turkish involvement in exposure of Israeli special agents in Iran in October 2013, the relations between Israel and Turkey declined further.

==== Renormalization (2015–present) ====
In December 2015, Turkey and Israel began talks to restore diplomatic ties. Disagreements between the sides continued.

==== Reconciliation agreement ====
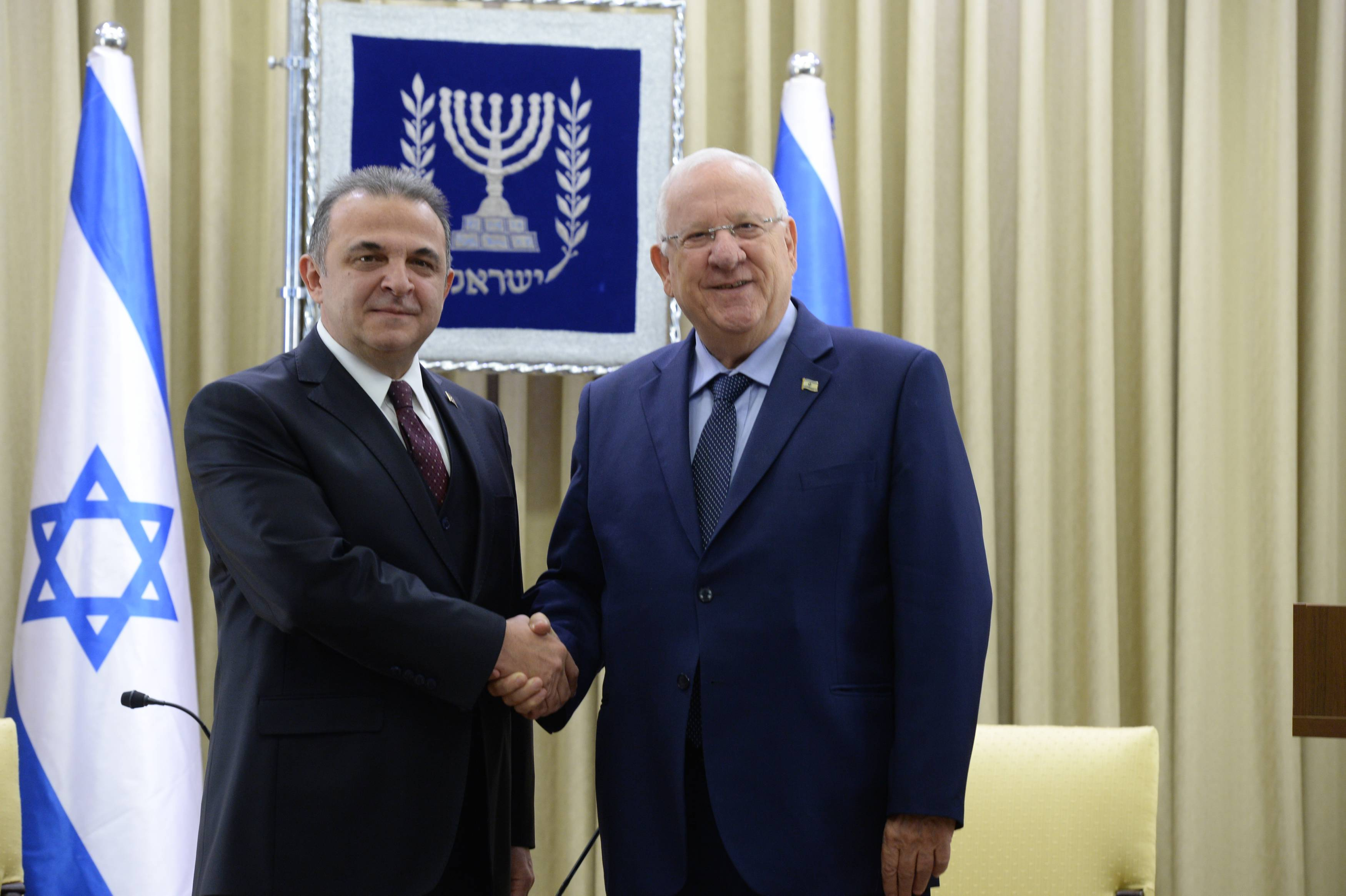
Turkish ambassador to Israel Kemal Ökem presents his letter of credence to the president of Israel Reuven Rivlin on 12 December 2016

A reconciliation agreement was announced on 27 June 2016 to end the six-year rift in the relation between both countries.

- The Turkish Parliament will pass a law canceling all appeals against Israeli soldiers involved in the killing of nine Turkish citizens during the Gaza flotilla raid and will also block any future claims.
- Commitment to stop terrorist or military activity against Israel on Turkish soil including funding and aid to such activities from Turkey. Palestinian movement Hamas will be allowed to operate on Turkish soil but only as a political movement.
- Turkey will accept to send all aid to the Gaza Strip through Israel and then from Israel to Gaza on land.
- Israel will allow Turkey to advance humanitarian projects in the Gaza Strip, such as building an hospital, power station and a desalination station, all subjected to Israeli security considerations
- Israel will give $20 million as compensation for the families of those who died and were injured in the raid. The money will be transferred through a humanitarian fund in Turkey. An Israel official said the money will be transferred only after the Turkish parliament will pass the law renouncing all appealings against Israeli soldiers involved in the incident.
- The two countries will start a process of renormalizing their relations, reappointing ambassadors to Ankara and Tel Aviv and ending all sanctions between the two.

The agreement was approved by the Israeli security cabinet by a vote of 7–3 on 29 June.

The agreement was then approved by the Turkish parliament on 20 August 2016. Turkish President Recep Tayyip Erdoğan then signed the agreement on 31 August.

On 7 October, Turkey named foreign policy expert Kemal Ökem as ambassador to Israel. Israel's decision to name an ambassador was later postponed.

On 15 November, Israel named Eitan Na'eh as ambassador to Turkey. In a reciprocal move, Erdoğan confirmed on 16 November the nomination of Kemal Ökem as Turkish ambassador to Israel. Na'eh arrived in Ankara on 31 November. Turkey also agreed to drop charges against four Israeli soldiers on 8 December. On 12 December, Ökem arrived in Jerusalem.

==== Libya–Turkey maritime deal, EastMed pipeline, and Bat Galim incident ====
Following the December 2019 deal between the Tripoli faction in the Second Libyan Civil War and Turkey that allowed for the deployment of Turkish ground troops in Libya and the declared Turkey's sea borders to stretch from Anatolia all the way to the shores of Derna and Tobruk, foreign minister Israel Katz announced Israel's opposition to the maritime border accord between Ankara and Tripoli, and confirmed that the deal was "illegal" according to the Israeli official position, while at the same time noting that Israel does not want a conflict with Turkey.

Earlier in the month, the Turkish navy had driven out an Israeli oceanographic research vessel that had been operating with the consent of the Cypriot government in Cypriot waters. This act, in the context of the deal with the GNA, led to Israeli fears that Turkey aimed to "create a sea border the width of the entire Mediterranean" and cut off Israeli access international waters via the Mediterranean sea, the channel of 99% of Israeli exports. Energy expert Brenda Schaffer interprets the EastMed pipeline between Israel, Cyprus, and Greece (forecasted to be able to cater to 10% of Europe's gas needs, and decrease reliance on Russia) as a joint attempt to exclude Turkey from the "Club Med" gas club, but the decision to sign the deal was stated to be a response to the Turkish-Libyan deal.

==== Yossi Cohen's remark, Nagorno-Karabakh conflict, and rise of anti-Turkish coalition ====
In August 2020, Mossad's chief Yossi Cohen had openly named Turkey as a new threat for the peace of the region, and even further single out a number of allies Turkey would gain potential support like Azerbaijan and Qatar, the former has strong relations with Israel since 1990s. His remark was considered as a major move by Israel to openly confront the Turkish government.

Israel's decision to normalize relations with Bahrain and the United Arab Emirates via Abraham Accords had further worsened its relations with Turkey, as Ankara openly accused the two Arab nations of complicit on supporting Israel against Palestinians. In response, Turkey hosted two Hamas leaders, a move which triggered condemnation from Israel and the United States.

During the 2020 Nagorno-Karabakh conflict, Israel openly supported Azerbaijan, an ally of Turkey and Israel. After Turkey blamed Israel for destabilization in the Caucasus, Israeli Defense Minister Benny Gantz accused Turkey of inflaming war in the region. Israel had also considered suspending support for Azerbaijan as a retaliation.

Following the end of Karabakh conflict, Yaakov Amidror, a retired major general who spent more than 30 years in senior positions in the Israel Defense Forces and government, for the first time stated that Turkish political influence in Azerbaijan is now representing as a threat to Israel due to Turkey's recent open opposition to Azerbaijan's good relations with Israel and Turkey's strong political, economic and cultural tie with Azerbaijan. He also stated that Israel has no intention on who is to control Karabakh, but rather only wish to express better relations with Baku since Azerbaijan is one of the only few Muslim nations to recognize Israel. Previously, Turkish ambassador in 2011 had urged Azerbaijan to sever relations with Israel.

==== France–Muslim world tensions ====
Turkish President Erdoğan, following French President Emmanuel Macron's statement about Islam, has compared the situation of Muslims in Europe today to the Jews in World War II. This statement was condemned in Israel, who pointed out the Turkish government's absence on voicing solidarity following the murder of French teacher Samuel Paty, as well as accusing Turkish government of hyping the situation and signal the differences between Nazi policy in World War II and French struggle against Islamic extremism. A Pakistani journalist working for Haaretz, Kunwar Khuldune Shahid, has pointed out that the Turkish government is openly glorifying mass killings on non-Muslims while trying to create blasphemy and hypocrisies throughout abusing the Holocaust for its political gains.

==== Turkish support for Hamas ====
Hamas is receiving diplomatic support from Turkey and the Hamas delegations in 2019 and 2020 hosted in Turkey. In addition, according to reports Saleh al-Arouri, a top Hamas official, is living in Turkey for many years. Israeli media also reported that Hamas planned attacks against Israel from Turkey, including kidnappings in 2014. In 2020, according to Israeli diplomats Turkey gave passports and identity cards to Hamas members in Istanbul.

==== 2021 Israel–Palestine crisis ====
During the 2021 Israel–Palestine crisis, Turkey accused Israel for the violence. The Turkish president called Israel a terror state and said that Turkey took initiatives to make international institutions to take action. In addition, the Turkish Foreign Minister said during his speech at the United Nations General Assembly that Israel is the sole responsible for the violence and must held accountable for its crimes. In another speech at the United Nations Human Rights Council, he said that Israel's actions are "crimes against humanity". In an emergency meeting of the Organization of Islamic Cooperation, Turkey proposed an "international protection mechanism", including the deploy of a military force, for the protection of the Palestinians. The Turkey's vice president Fuat Oktay said that the Muslim countries should act and take a clear stance. During a phone call with the Russian President Vladimir Putin, the Turkish President told him that the international community should “give Israel a strong and deterrent lesson.” In another call, the Turkish President asked the Pope Francis to support sanctions against Israel. The Turkish president also talked with King Abdullah of Jordan, and called for Turkey and Jordan to work together to stop Israel's attacks on Palestine. Furthermore, Erdoğan spoke to the phone with the Emir of Kuwait Nawaf Al-Ahmad Al-Jaber Al-Sabah, the Palestinian President Mahmoud Abbas and the Hamas leader Ismail Haniyeh. While the Turkish Foreign Minister talked in the phone with his counterparts from Iran, Algeria, Pakistan and Russia. Thousands of protesters demonstrated in Turkish cities against Israel, despite a full lock down in the country due to the COVID-19 pandemic. The Turkish National Security Council condemned the occupation of Palestinian lands by Israel and attacks against Palestinians.

==== Rapprochement ====
In a sign of warming ties, Israeli President Isaac Herzog visited Turkey to meet with Erdoğan in March 2022. On 17 August 2022, the office of Israeli Prime Minister Yair Lapid announced that Israel and Turkey had decided to restore full diplomatic ties and will return ambassadors to each other's country. In September 2022, Lapid and Turkish President Erdoğan met in the United Nations General Assembly in New York. It was the first meeting between Israel's prime minister and Turkey's president in 14 years, meaning a sign of warming ties between the countries.

==== 2023 Gaza war and spillover ====
Following the start of the Gaza war, at an AK Party congress in Ankara, Recep Tayyip Erdoğan called on Israelis and Palestinians to act with restraint and refrain from hostile acts that could exacerbate the situation. On 11 October, Erdoğan called the Israeli blockade and bombing of Gaza as a massacre and offered Turkish mediation in the war. On 25 October, he condemned the civilian deaths caused by Hamas's attack, but he also mentioned that Hamas is not a terrorist organization but a liberation group fighting to protect its lands and people. Nationalist Movement Party's leader Devlet Bahçeli called for a trial at the International Court of Justice against Israel's Prime Minister Benjamin Netanyahu.

In November 2023, the Turkish President called Israel a "terrorist state" and accused it of committing genocide against the Palestinians, adding that Turkey will take steps to ensure that the Israeli settlers will be recognised as terrorists. In return, Netanyahu and Israeli Foreign Minister Eli Cohen responded that Turkey hosts and encourages terrorist organizations, such as Hamas, and that Turkish forces have "shelled villages in Turkey" and shouldn't preach Israel. Turkey, in an official response, dismissed the accusations as unfounded. Some days later, Erdogan said that Israel is committing a crime against humanity and genocide, adding that Turkey, along with the support of over 2,000 lawyers, will file a legal complaint against Israel. In addition, he said that due to Turkey's efforts, during the Riyadh summit, there were important steps towards the designation of the Israeli settlers as terrorists, and that Turkey will keep Israel's nuclear weapons issue on the world's agenda. Furthermore, he added that Israel's operation in Gaza is as brutal as the crusader's occupation and World War II and that Israel is "openly committing war crimes".

In a phone call with Iran's president, Ebrahim Raisi, Erdoğan talked about the importance of a unified stance from the Islamic world against the Israeli brutality. On 28 October 2023, Israel withdrew its diplomats from Turkey to reassess the relations between the two countries, according to a statement by Israel's foreign minister Eli Cohen. This move came in the aftermath of comments by Erdoğan, accusing Israel of war crimes in the occupied Palestinian Territories. Turkish and Israeli politicians were arguing and "fighting" on social media throughout this period.

In February 2024, the Turkish foreign minister Hakan Fidan said that Israel seeks more land and not security and also condemned Israel, while also criticized the international community. In late February, Turkey also gave an oral presentation at the International Court of Justice against Israel. In March 2024, in a joint news conference in Turkey with the Palestinian President Mahmoud Abbas, the Turkish President accused Israel of committing a genocide and one of the greatest barbarities of the century, with the support of the West. On 22 March 2024, Israeli Foreign Minister Israel Katz instructed the Israeli Foreign Ministry to summon Turkey's envoy to Israel after Erdoğan vowed to "send Netanyahu to Allah" during an election rally.

In April 2024, Turkish high officials, including the president, foreign minister and National Intelligence Agency chief, met with the Hamas chief in Istanbul. While before this meeting, the Turkish Foreign Minister met the Hamas leader also in Qatar. Devlet Bahçeli, the leader of the Nationalist Movement Party, criticised Israel and the United Nations and also said that for regional and global peace a Palestinian state must be established.

In May 2024, Turkey announced that it stopped all trade with Israel and also joined South Africa's legal lawsuit against Israel before the International Court of Justice. In addition, the Turkish President said that more than 1,000 Hamas members have received treatment in hospitals in Turkey. Later, a Turkish official claimed that the president meant Gazans and not Hamas members. Furthermore, the Turkish Foreign Minister stated during a press conference with Pakistan's Foreign Minister that the two nations are working together to recognise the Palestinian state and put an end to Israel's "crimes against humanity".

In an official statement issued in July 2024, Turkey's National Security Council urged the international community to take action to stop Israel's "atrocities violating all legal and humanitarian principles", while in a speech, the Turkish president called the Israeli prime minister, Hitler and in another speech said that Turkey can enter Israel as she did in Libya and Nagorno-Karabakh. At the same time, the Turkish parliament denounced the Israeli Prime Minister's statement to the US Congress and also labelled him as a war criminal.

In September 2024, at a joint press conference with the chairman of the Presidency of Bosnia and Herzegovina, the Turkish President compared the ongoing Israeli operation with the Srebrenica massacre. In addition, the Turkey's National Intelligence Organization chief had a meeting in Ankara with Hamas leaders regarding the ongoing ceasefire negotiations with Israel.

After the October 2024 Israeli strikes on Iran, the Turkish President said that Israel, with the help of West, is trying to ignite a regional conflict. In addition, he gave his support to the Iranian government and people.

On 13 November 2024, Erdoğan announced that Turkey was severing all its diplomatic relations with Israel due to Israel's reluctance to end the war in Gaza.

Relations continued to deteriorate throughout 2025. In June, Israeli foreign minister Israel Katz told Erdoğan that "a little self-awareness could be helpful" regarding his criticism of Israel's actions in Gaza; he said Erdoğan's comments were hypocritical given the Turkish occupation of Cyprus and invasion of Syria. The Turkish Foreign Ministry described Katz's comments as "vile lies and slander" and said Israeli leaders would be held accountable for war crimes in Gaza. In August, Netanyahu said he personally recognized the Armenian genocide, though his statement did not constitute formal recognition. Turkey retaliated by closing its airspace to Israeli aircraft and cutting off economic relations.

In November 2025, Turkey announced that it has issued arrest warrants against Benjamin Netanyahu and other senior officials in his government, accusing them of "genocide and crimes against humanity" that Israel has "perpetrated systematically" in Gaza since October 2023. The list contained 37 officials, including Israel Katz, Eyal Zamir, and Itamar Ben-Gvir.

In early September 2026, Israel appointed diplomat Joel Lion as chargé d'affaires in Turkey. Lion became Israel's first diplomatic representative in the country since October 2023, while the Israeli embassy remained inactive.

===== Intelligence agencies =====
Under Erdoğan's leadership, Turkey has expanded its military influence in the region. Israeli and Western officials have accused Ankara of allowing Hamas operatives to operate in Turkey, including allegations involving financial and logistical support as well as the granting of Turkish citizenship to some members. Turkish intelligence and police have disrupted Israeli intelligence networks tracking Hamas activities in Turkey. After Ronen Bar, the head of Shin Bet, said that Israel plans to hunt Hamas members outside of Palestinian territories, including Turkey, Turkish intelligence warned Israel against targeting Hamas members outside of Palestine.

The next months after this warning, the Turkish authorities arrested a lot of suspects with the accusation of working for Israel, including:

- In early January 2024, Turkish authorities arrested 33 people with the accusation of spying for Israel. According to Turkey, they were planning to carry out different activities including reconnaissance, pursuing, assaulting and kidnapping foreign nationals living in Turkey. Turkish Interior Minister Ali Yerlikaya said: "We will never allow espionage activities to be conducted against the national unity and solidarity of our country".
- In early February, Turkish authorities arrested 7 people, according to media the suspects accused of gathering information on Palestinians with Hamas connections who lived in Turkey and seemed dangerous to Israel.
- In early March 2024, Turkish authorities arrested 7 suspects accused of working for Mossad.
- In early April 2024, Turkish authorities arrested 8 suspects accused of working for Mossad.
- In early July 2024, a prosecutor has asked prison sentences for 57 defendants, while the court has released 18 of them.
- In February 2026, Turkish authorities dismantled an operative cell controlled by Israeli intelligence that was trying to spy on Palestinian targets and break into supply chains. Two people, who were suspected of working and provided information to Mossad were later arrested.

== Armenian genocide ==
Israel has maintained an ambivalent stance towards the Armenian genocide, officially not endorsing or against it, due to the issue in relations with Turkey and its long-standing ally Azerbaijan, which has been in good terms with Israel.

According to historians Rıfat Bali and Marc David Baer, Armenian genocide denial was the most important factor in the normalization of relations. The 1982 International Conference on the Holocaust and Genocide, which took place in Tel Aviv, included six presentations on the Armenian genocide. Turkey threatened that if the conference was held, it would close its borders to Jewish refugees from Iran and Syria, putting their lives in danger. As a result, the Israeli Foreign Ministry joined the ultimately unsuccessful effort to cancel the conference.

In April 2001, a Turkish newspaper quoted foreign minister Shimon Peres as saying, "We reject attempts to create a similarity between the Holocaust and the Armenian allegations. Nothing similar to the Holocaust occurred. It is a tragedy what the Armenians went through, but not a genocide." According to Charny and Auron, this statement crossed the line into active denial of the Armenian genocide. Scholar Eldad Ben Aharon considers that Peres simply made explicit what had been Israel's policy since 1948. Israel–Turkey relations deteriorated in the late 2010s, but Israel's relations with Azerbaijan remain close and the Azerbaijan–Israel International Association has lobbied against recognition of the genocide.

Israel was aware of the repercussion. This policy stems from a few geopolitical considerations. First, according to The Times of Israel, "Israel is a small country in a hostile neighborhood that can't afford to antagonize the few friends it has in the region. Even more powerful states refuse to employ the 'genocide' term for fear of alienating Turkey...." Second, Israel shares a "budding friendship" with Azerbaijan, a "Shiite Muslim but moderate country bordering Iran" that also strongly opposes recognition. Third, according to former Israeli minister Yossi Sarid, one of the country's most vocal supporters of Armenian genocide recognition, Israel tends to follow policies set by the United States, which has also not recognized the genocide. Despite these concerns, many prominent Israeli figures from different sides of the political spectrum have called for recognition.

Growing tensions between Turkey and Israel since the 2010s enabled greater calls for recognising the Armenian genocide in Israel, despite it possibly running in contradiction against relations with Azerbaijan. In 2019, the United States officially recognised the genocide, with tacit involvement by Israeli lobbies refusing to lobby for Turkey and Azerbaijan. The Israeli lobbies again did not prevent U.S. President Joe Biden from recognising the genocide in 2021, which was met with a furious response in Turkey. While Israel remains committed to its relationship with Azerbaijan, Azerbaijan's pro-Turkey attitude was seen as a concern by Israel, resulting in Israel's tacit anti-Turkish policies often attacking Azerbaijani interests, with both Turkey and Azerbaijan also singled out as threats to Israel since 2020.

== Economic relationship ==
In 1996, Turkey and Israel signed a free-trade agreement. In 1997, a double-taxation prevention treaty went into effect. A bilateral investment treaty was signed in 1998.

Israeli-Turkish trade rose 26% to $2 billion in first half of 2011 from $1.59 billion in the first half of 2010. According to the Israeli Chamber of Commerce, Israeli exports to Turkey rose 39% to $950 million, and imports from Turkey rose 16% to $1.05 billion. Turkey is Israel's sixth-largest export destination. Chemicals and oil distillates are the primary exports. Turkey purchases high-tech defense equipment from Israel, whereas Turkey supplies Israel with military boots and uniforms. Israeli import of Turkish vegetable products has remained steady since 2007, and imports of prepared foodstuffs, beverages and tobacco doubled from 2007 to 2011.

On 2 March 2024, people in Turkey gathered in Istanbul to protest trade relations between Turkey and Israel. On 2 May 2024, Turkey announced that it was effective immediately suspending all trade with Israel due to the "worsening humanitarian tragedy" in the Palestinian territories. On 9 May 2024, Israel Katz, the foreign minister of Israel, claimed that the Turkish government had eased the trade ban with Israel. Turkish Minister of Trade Omar Bulat condemned Katz's claim, calling it "completely fictional." On 7 October 2024, Mustafa Yeneroğlu presented a report to parliament on the sharp increase in exports to Palestinian territories. Yeneroğlu requested Trade Ömer Bolat to reply to local media reports claiming that trade with Israel was quietly continuing through Palestinian companies, with shipping documents representing goods as destined for Palestinian territories when they were going to Israel. Bolat denied these claims. On 8 October 2024, Reuters reported, that Turkish exports to the Palestinian territories increased by 35 percent, according to the Turkish Exporters Assembly (TIM), five months after Turkey banned trade with Israel. according to the Yedioth Ahronoth newspaper, Turkish exporters and Israeli importers are utilizing a new logistical route to circumvent the trade ban. This route first transports Turkish products to third countries, such as Greece, Bulgaria, and Romania, before they are sent to Israel. Although this transit incurs additional shipping costs, it guarantees a continuous flow of goods.

== Military collaboration ==
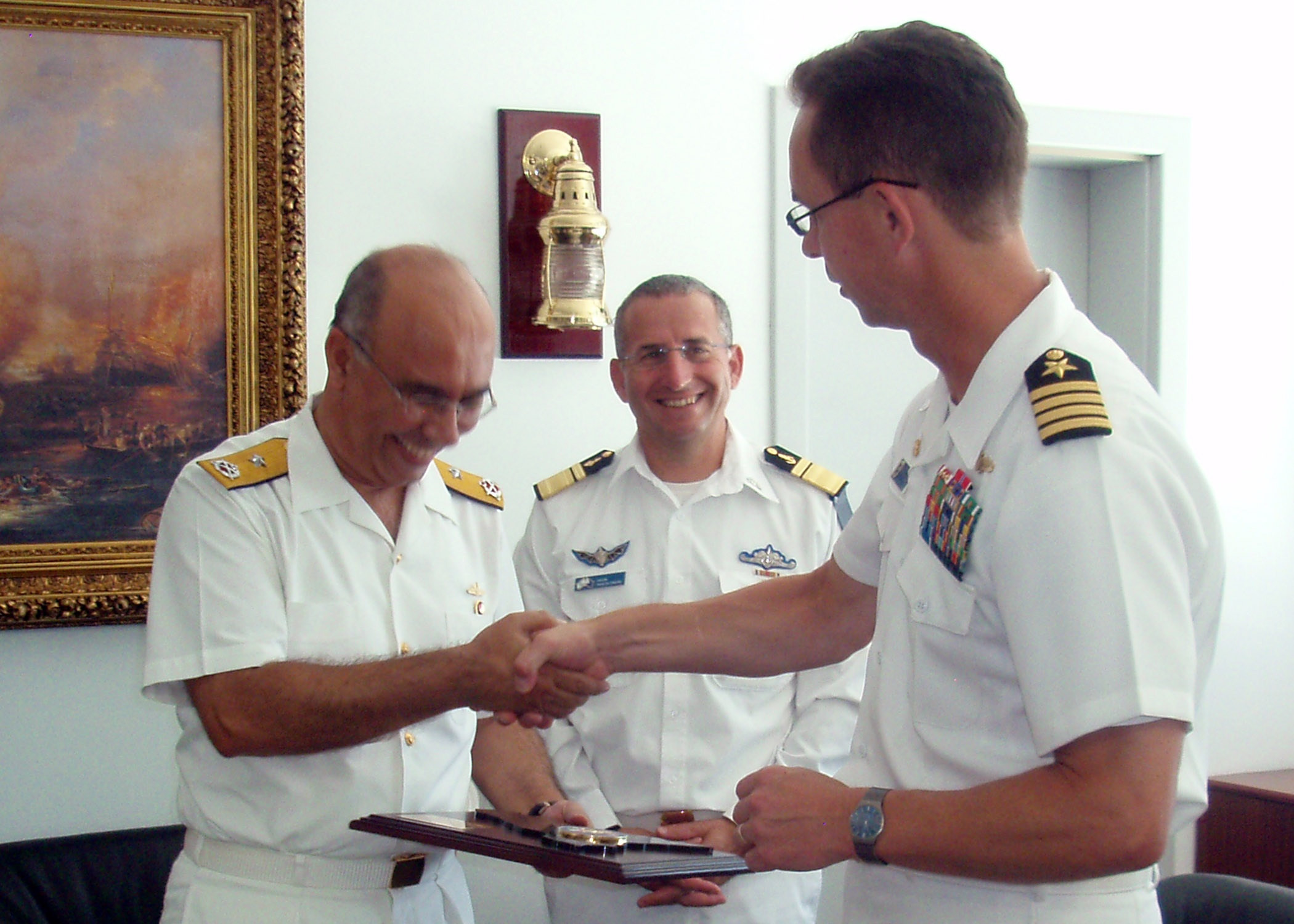
Turkey-Israel naval collaboration, 2009: US Capt. John Moore, Turkish Rear Adm. Ismail Taylan, Israeli Rear Adm. Rom Rutberg

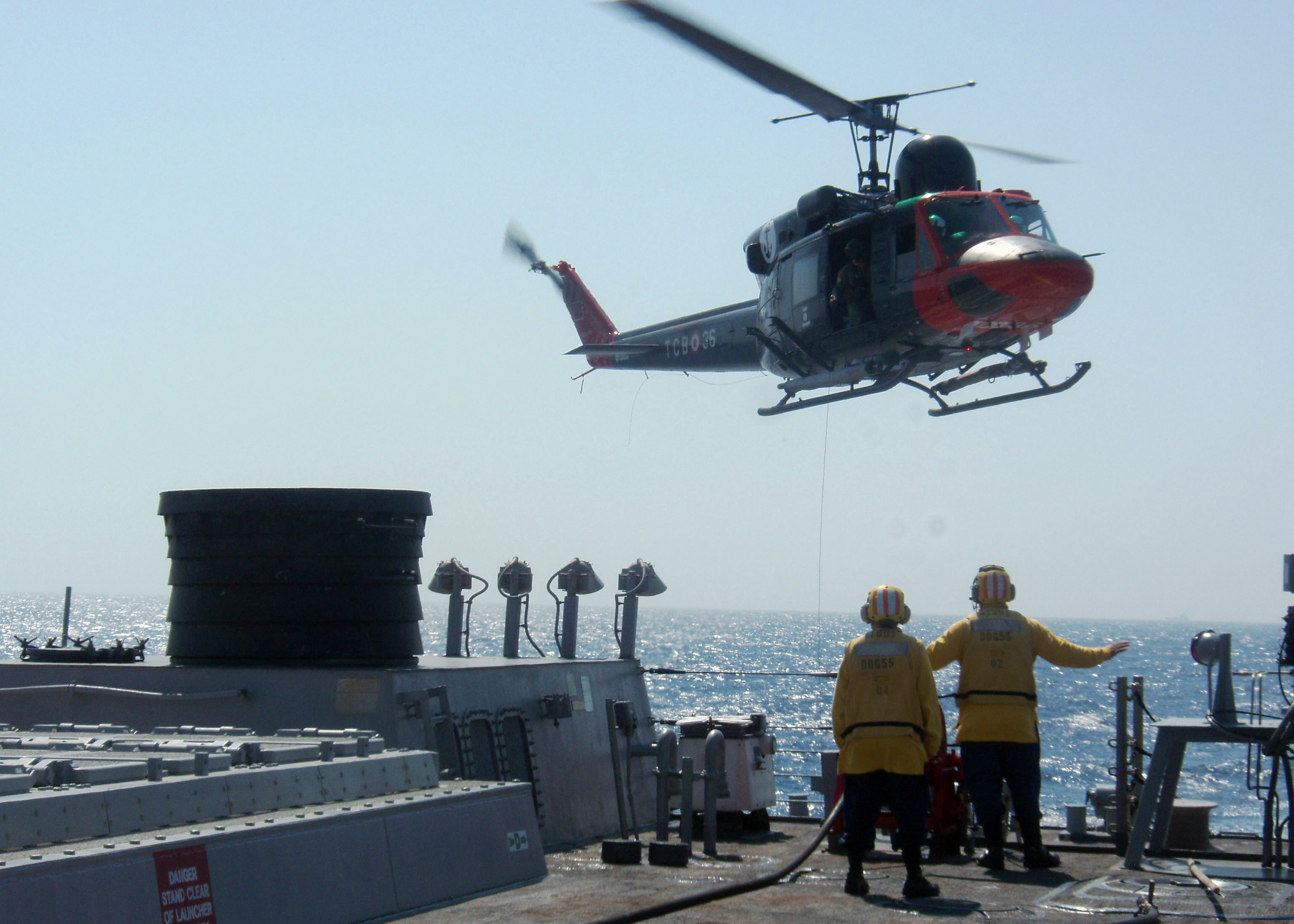
Annual U.S.-Turkish-Israeli training exercise, 2009

In August of 1956, against the backdrop of the Suez War and almost a year of secret meetings between Turkish and Israeli officials, headed on the Israeli side by Golda Meir, the two countries respective Prime Ministers, Adnan Menderes and David Ben-Gourion met secretly in Ankara to discuss military cooperation and military training programs between the two nations in what became known as the peripheral alliance, alongside the peripheral alliance Turkey, Israel and Iran formed an intelligence sharing alliance leading to the creation of the Trident organization to facilitate intelligence exchange between Turkey's National Security Service and later the National Intelligence Organization, Mossad, and SAVAK. The tripartite alliance collapsed following the Iranian Revolution. Relations between Turkey and Israel continued in a state of flux dependent on political considerations.

In April and February of 1996, spearheaded on the Turkish side by Çevik Bir, Turkey and Israel signed two military treaties believing to consist of protocols regarding 'officer exchanges, visits by military delegations, naval port calls, access to training areas, joint air and naval training, cooperation in the areas of counter-terrorism and border security, and defense industrial cooperation', in addition to strengthening the aforementioned long-standing intelligence ties.

In 2007, Israel and Turkey discussed the sale of Israeli Ofeq satellites and Arrow missile air-defence systems to Turkey to upgrade Turkish military and intelligence capabilities. Israeli defense companies have helped to modernize the F-4 Phantom fleet of the Turkish air force. Agreements have included air, sea, land and intelligence cooperation, manufacturing of aircraft, armaments and missiles, mutual military visits, training and exercises, dispatch of observers to oversee military exercises, staff exchanges and military know-how.

- Modernization of Turkey's F-4 Phantoms and F-5 aircraft – $900 million.
- Upgrading 170 of Turkey's M60A1 tanks – $687 million.
- Popeye-I and Popeye-II missiles.
- Popeye-II surface-to-air missiles – $150 million.
- 10 Heron UAV – $183 million.
- Arrow anti-ballistic-missiles. (Agreed in principle by Israel; approval by the United States pending.)
- The agreement provided exchange of pilots eight times a year; allowed Israeli pilots to practice "long range flying over mountainous land" in Turkey's Konya firing range; and permitted Turkish pilots to train at Israel's computerized firing range at the Nevatim airfield.
- The two navies conducted maneuvers during Operation Reliant Mermaid (the U.S. also participated) in January 1998.

In September 2011, military agreements between Turkey and Israel were suspended. Turkey has frozen 16 defense contracts worth billions of dollars since March 2010. Turkey suspended a $5 billion deal for 1,000 Merkava Mk 3 tanks. Turkey also dropped Israel Aerospace Industries Arrow-2 anti-ballistic missile system worth $2 billion from bidding, with only U.S., European, and Chinese companies allowed to bid.

== Tourism ==
Turkey is a popular tourism destination for Israelis. Istanbul is a 90-minute flight from Tel Aviv. No visas are required for Israelis to visit Turkey, while Turkish citizens with ordinary passports need a visa prior to travelling Israel. In 2008, before the 2008–09 Gaza War, 560,000 Israelis vacationed in Turkey, according to Israeli tourism officials. In October 2010 Israel's Tourism Minister Stas Misezhnikov encouraged Israelis to boycott Turkey as a vacation spot in response to Turkey's stance on Gaza. The number of Israeli tourists in Turkey dropped to 300,000 in 2009 and to 110,000 in 2010; it declined further to about 62,000 between January and August 2011. According to Turkey's Ministry of Culture and Tourism, Israelis' share of Turkey's total tourism declined from 3% to 0.05%. The number of Arab tourists in Turkey, by contrast, increased to about 1.4 million visitors in the first part of 2011, a jump from about 912,000 in the whole of 2009. Turkey's Prime Minister Recep Tayyip Erdoğan stated in June 2012: "We do not need Israeli tourists. We have successfully filled their places".

Still, tourism to Antalya rose by more than 20% from September 2010 to September 2011, and the number of Israeli visitors to Istanbul rose 13%, still well below previous peaks.

Turkish Airlines dropped the number of weekly flights to Israel by about half in 2010. In 2011, Turkish charter airlines began to cut back weekly flights on routes to and from Israel against the backdrop of the crisis in relations between the two counties and the decline in Israelis' Turkey holidays. It also emerged that El Al Israel Airlines had contingency plans that would address the possibility that Turkey would bar the Israeli carrier from overflying Turkish territory. It was announced by the Israeli Airports Authority that in 2013 and 2014 Turkish Airlines flew more passengers to and from Israel than any other foreign airline.

== Disaster relief efforts ==
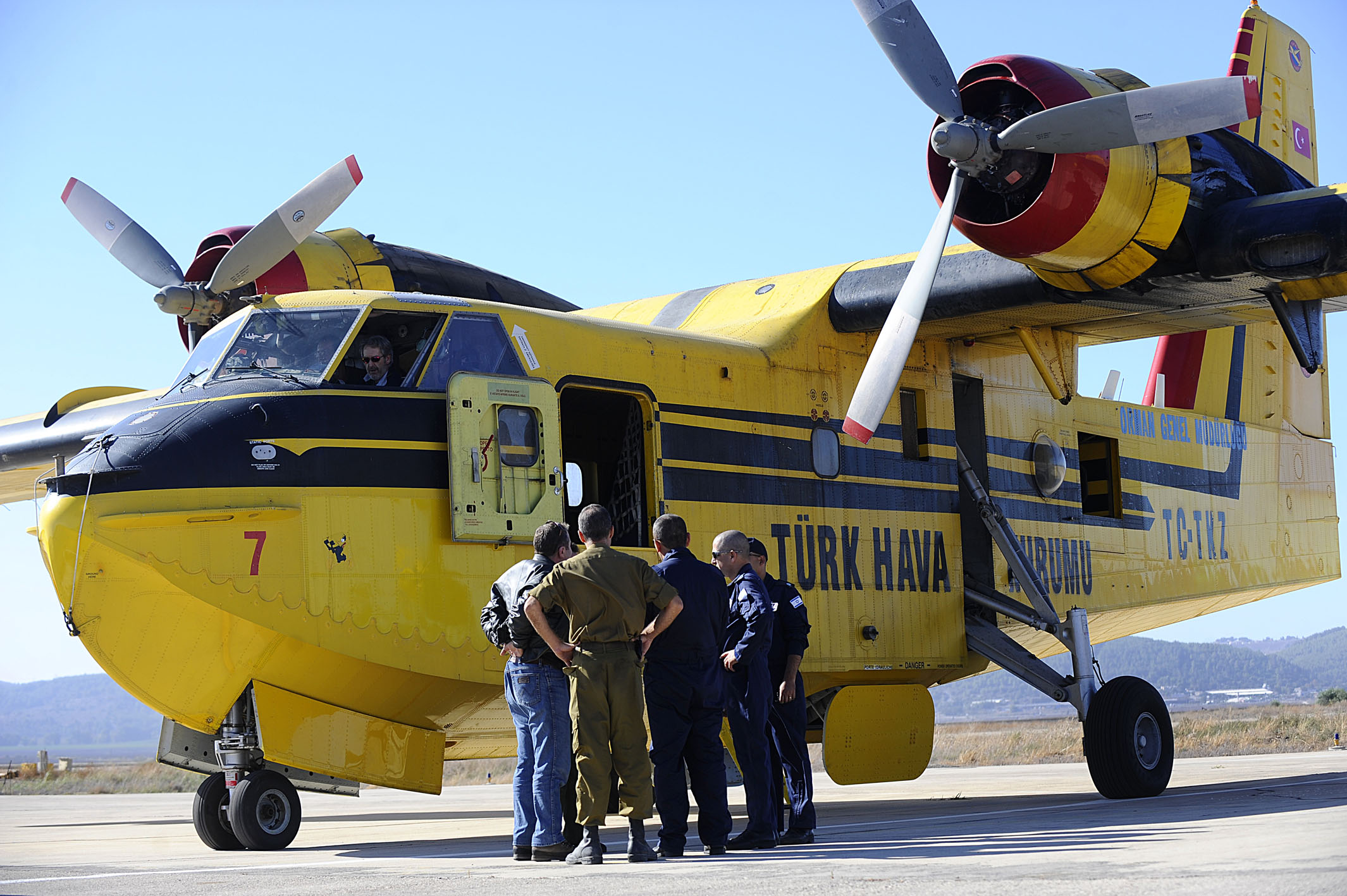
Turkish firefighting plane sent to aid Israel, 2010

After the 1999 Izmit earthquake, Israel assisted in search and rescue efforts and set up makeshift hospitals. The Israeli team included hundreds of personnel from the IDF SAR team, paramedics, surgeons and administrative personnel. The team was one of the largest international teams to assist in the catastrophe (which claimed more than 17,000 lives) and remained active for weeks. One of the iconic images of the catastrophe was an "Israeli rescue dog with a red Star of David sniffing through debris in the devastated port city of Gölcük".

During the Mount Carmel forest fire in 2010, Turkey was one of the first nations to send aid to Israel. Turkey sent two firefighting aircraft, which started to extinguish the fire in the early hours of 3 December.

Following the 2011 Van earthquake, Israel offered to provide prefabricated housing and tents in response to Turkish requests for foreign aid. Israel airlifted mobile homes to the devastated region.

=== 2023 Turkey–Syria earthquake ===
In the wake of the 2023 Turkey–Syria earthquake, Israel provided significant humanitarian aid and emerged as one of the most vital and prominent partners of the Turkish government in their search and rescue attempts and efforts to recover and rebuild in the aftermath of the large tremors which devastated Southern Turkey. Israel previously assisted Turkey with search and rescue efforts in the aftermath of the 2011 Van earthquakes and 1999 İzmit earthquake and has deployed more than 430 search and rescue, disaster relief and humanitarian aid workers and sent more than 15 cargo planes with hundreds of tons of humanitarian aid and set up a field hospital, as of 8 February, mainly to the areas of Adana and Gaziantep. Of these, 230 were IDF medics operating an Israeli field hospital in Gaziantep, 167 were from an elite search and rescue unit of Israel Defense Force officers from the Home Front Command which has assisted 31 countries and has extensive experience in conducting search and rescue operations in the aftermath of natural disasters and war both in Israel and abroad, and most recently assisting in Ukraine during the current war and during the Surfside building collapse in the United States, and 2017 Puebla earthquake in Mexico. The first delegation organized by the IDF consisted of 17 was sent on 6 February with a larger 150 member delegation sent by the IDF the next morning. A third delegation consisting of delegation of dozens of Israeli doctors, medics, rescue operators and psychotrauma specialists along with 10 tons of equipment and humanitarian aid was sent by United Hatzalah, an Israeli volunteer-based emergency medical services NGO on the afternoon of 7 February. A fourth delegation from IsraAID including trauma experts and others brought with them water purification systems to assist Turks needing clean water in the aftermath. IsraAID planned to assess the needs on the ground to determine what other help would be needed going forward, according to an IsraAID member. The Israeli government sent over 30 tons of humanitarian equipment to carry out rescue missions in Turkey, as of 7 February, and was planning on sending a second flight of humanitarian aid and medicine, according to a spokesperson for the Israeli Embassy in Washington. Israeli President Isaac Herzog reached out to President Recep Tayyip Erdoğan to offer his condolences on behalf of the people of Israel. The establishment of an Israeli field hospital in Gaziantep was approved by Defencs Minister Yoav Gallant. Prime Minister Benjamin Netanyahu has said received a request through Russian interlocutors to send aid to Syria and assist in search and rescue operations there even though the two nations are technically in a state of war and do not have relations. Israel has plans to send aid to Syria, including humanitarian aid, medication, blankets, and tents. In contrast to the assistance provided by Israel to Turkey, any assistance provided to Syria by the Israeli government would not involve the military, according to IDF spokesman Ran Kochav who stated that the military was not involved in potential aid to Syria.

== Cultural ties ==
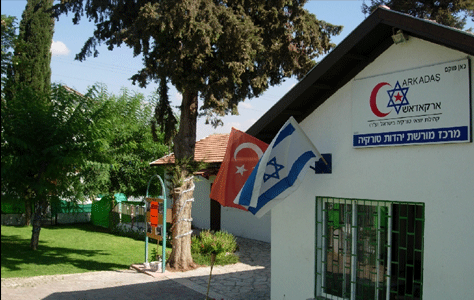
Arkadaş Association, Yehud, Israel

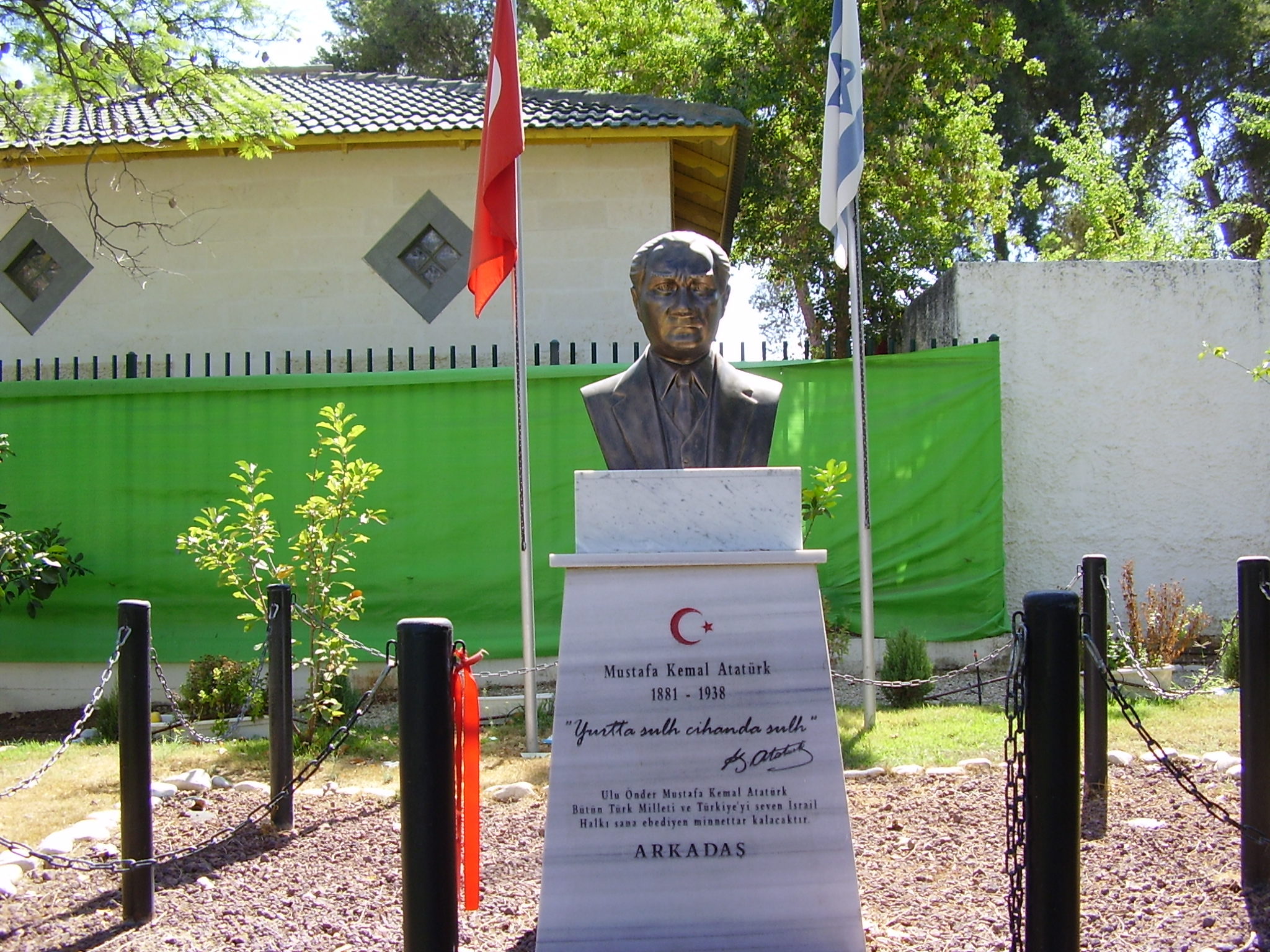
Atatürk memorial built by Arkadaş Association in Yehud

The Arkadaş Association was established in 2003 to preserve the heritage of Turkish Jews, promote the study of Ladino, and strengthen ties between Israel and Turkey. The organization has over 4,000 members since its inception, about 40 volunteers to run its vast operations and its twelve branches throughout the country. Eyal Peretz, chairman of the association, told the Jerusalem Post that Jewish heritage trips to Turkey had stopped because of security concerns and dwindling demand. Peretz stated, "I've devoted most of my life as an adult to cultivate ties between the two people and I've seen how a warm relationship has been erased in one fell swoop. It's very painful, very frustrating."

== Regional realignments ==
=== Turkish-occupied Northern Cyprus ===
Cyprus and Israel signed an accord demarcating their maritime borders to facilitate offshore gas exploration. Cypriot Foreign Minister Markos Kyprianou and Israel's Infrastructure Minister Uzi Landau signed the deal in Nicosia. The intent is to facilitate a search for mineral deposits in the east Mediterranean where huge natural gas reserves have been discovered. Turkish sources said that the Foreign Ministry had summoned Israel's Ambassador to Turkey, Gabby Levy, and expressed discontent over the agreement. Israeli energy firm Delek Group is seeking to work with Cyprus on natural gas exploration and extraction where Delek is already active.

According to Turkish media reports in September 2011, Israel Air Force fighter planes flew through the airspace of Cyprus after taking off to face a Turkish seismic research ship in the Eastern Mediterranean. The reports added that Turkey responded by launching two fighters to track the Israeli planes, at which point the Israeli fighter jets returned to Israeli airspace. The Turkish research vessel was seen as a Turkish provocation in the dispute over gas fields. The operation of Israeli planes in Cyprus airspace was interpreted as a further sign of close Israel-Cyprus ties and as a challenge to Turkey. In May 2012, the Turkish Army command said its fighter jets chased an Israeli plane out of Turkish-occupied Cypriot airspace. That same month, Cyprus also denied a report that Israel planned to deploy 20,000 troops in Cyprus to protect Israelis working on energy projects.

Israel is one of the few nations which officially recognises northern Cyprus as occupied, as opposed to simply unrecognised.

== See also ==
- Alliance of the periphery
- Antisemitism in Turkey
- Azerbaijan–Israel relations
- 2010 Gaza flotilla raid
- History of the Jews in Turkey
- Jewish Museum of Turkey
- List of ambassadors of Turkey to Israel
- Palestine–Turkey relations
- Turks in Israel
- Assassination of Efraim Elrom
- History of the Jews in the Ottoman Empire
