= Mustafa Kemal Atatürk Monument, Yehud =

Monument by an immigrant association

Mustafa Kemal Atatürk Monument
- Atatürk Anıtı
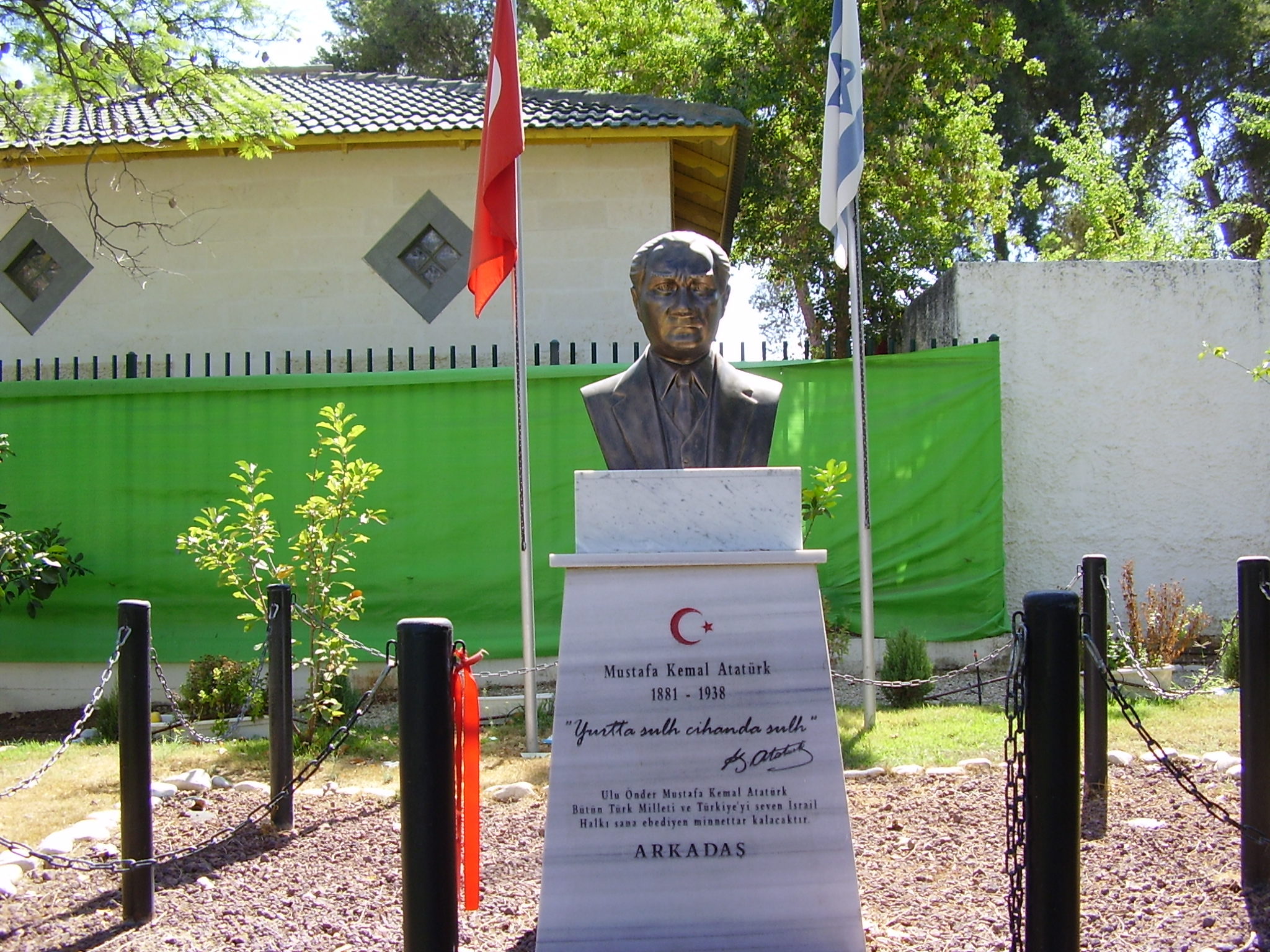
- Location: Yehud-Monosson, Israel
- Completion date: 2 November 2007
- Dedicated to: Mustafa Kemal Atatürk

The Mustafa Kemal Atatürk Monument is a monument dedicated to Atatürk, the founder of the Turkish Republic, in 2007 by the Arkadaş Association at the association's compound in Yehud, Israel.

== Location ==
The monument is located in front of the Arkadaş Association in Yehud-Monosson, Israel.

== Description ==
The monument consists of a bust of Atatürk on a marble foundation. On the foundation of the monument under "Mustafa Kemal Atatürk" and "1881-1938" it has his famous quote:

"Peace at home, peace in the world"

in its original Turkish and his signature. Under that it says:

"Ulu Önder Mustafa Kemal Atatürk, Bütün Türk Milleti ve Türkiye’yi seven İsrail halkı sana ebediyen minnettar kalacaktır. ARKADAŞ"

== History ==
It was unveiled 2 November 2007 in the presence of Turkish Ambassador Namık Tan.
