= Arkadaş Association =

Coordinates: 32.03534°N 34.89521°E

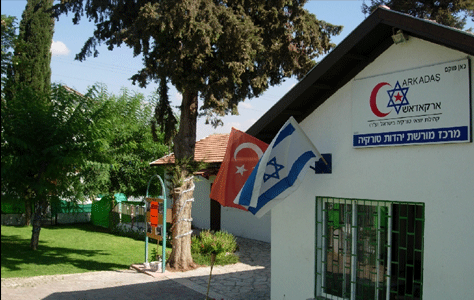
Arkadaş Association

Arkadaş Association is an Israel-Turkey friendship organization in Yehud-Monosson, Israel. Arkadaş (pronounced Arkadash) means "friend" in Turkish.

== History ==
Arkadaş Association was founded in 1997 by Eyal Peretz. Its main goals are to preserve Turkish Jewish heritage and promote friendship and tolerance between Israel and Turkey. In 2005, the association established a Turkish Jewish cultural center in Yehud.

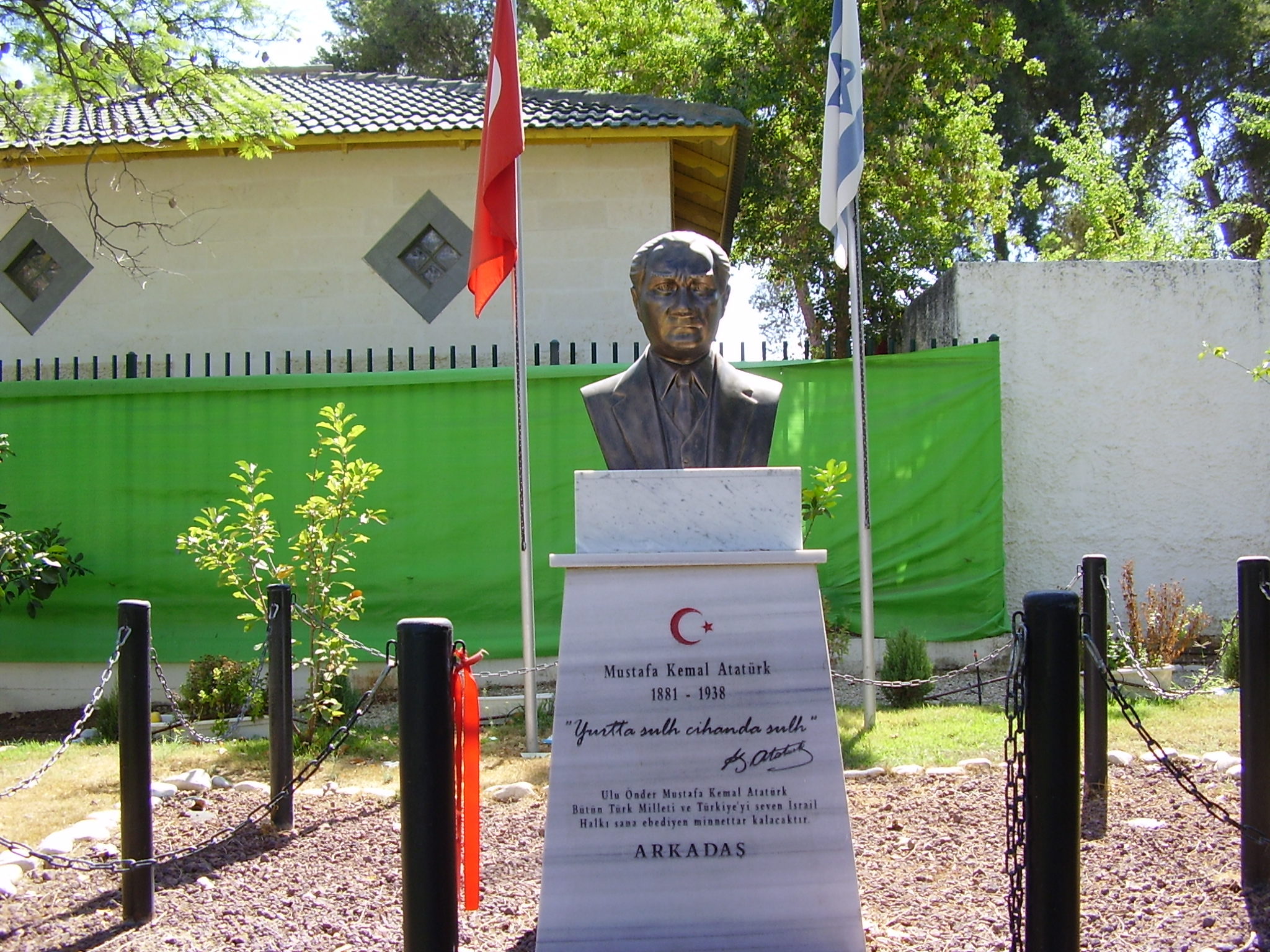
Mustafa Kemal Atatürk Monument

A monument to Atatürk in the garden of Arkadaş Association was dedicated on November 2, 2007 in a ceremony attended by the Turkish ambassador to Israel, Namık Tan.

The organization has over 4,000 members since its inception, about 40 volunteers to run its vast operations and its twelve branches throughout the country.

== See also ==
- History of the Jews in Turkey
- Turkish Jews in Israel
- Turkey-Israel relations
