= List of ambassadors of Turkey to Japan =

The Turkish Ambassador to Japan is the official representative of the President of Turkey and the Government of Turkey to the Emperor of Japan and Government of Japan.

== List of ambassadors ==
Ambassador	Term start	Term end
Hulusi Fuat Tugay	7 July 1925	25 March 1929
Cevad Ezine	7 April 1929	26 November 1931
Nebil Batı	17 December 1931	13 February 1936
Hüsrev Gerede	22 December 1936	19 June 1939
Ferid Tek	5 December 1939	13 July 1943
Ali Muzaffer Göker	10 September 1944	6 January 1945
İzzet Aksalur	27 November 1952	1 July 1955
Semih Baran	2 July 1955	29 May 1957
Süreyya Anderiman	30 May 1957	28 September 1959
Kemal Nejad Kavur	26 April 1960	21 September 1962
Melih Esenbel	25 September 1963	2 December 1966
Turgut Aytuğ	6 January 1967	29 January 1970
Şükrü Elekdağ	30 November 1970	23 August 1974
Celal Eyiceoğlu	31 October 1974	17 August 1979
Nazif Cuhruk	14 December 1979	23 September 1983
Nurver Nureş	1 October 1983	19 January 1987
Umut Arık	1 February 1987	17 December 1991
Necati Utkan	1 January 1992	23 October 1996
Gündüz Aktan	27 October 1996	19 May 1998
Yaman Başkurt	1 December 1998	25 December 2002
Solmaz Ünaydın	3 February 2003	26 January 2007
Selim Sermet Atacanlı	5 April 2007	3 April 2011
Abdurrahman Bilgiç	10 June 2011	22 October 2011
Serdar Kılıç	4 July 2012	2 April 2014
Ahmet Bülent Meriç	16 April 2014	15 November 2017
Hasan Murat Mercan	17 November 2017	28 February 2021
Korkut Güngen	15 March 2021	Present
