= Süleyman İnan Özyıldız =

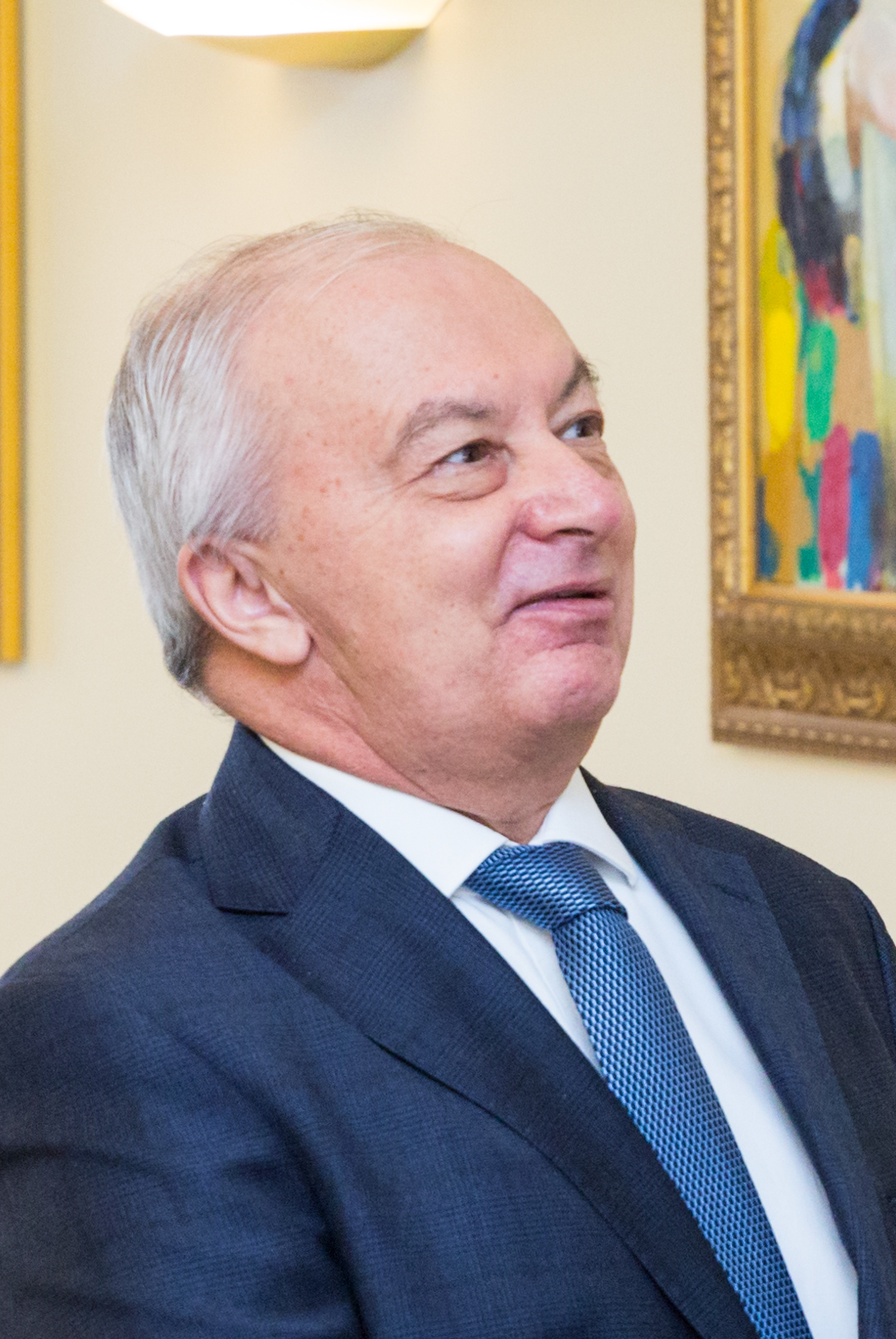

Ambassador of Turkey to Estonia
- In office 1 January 2020 – 8 January 2022
- Preceded by: Hayriye Kumaşcıoğlu
- Succeeded by: Başak Türkoğlu

Ambassador of Turkey to Lebanon
- In office 15 July 2010 – 1 September 2015
- Preceded by: Serdar Kılıç
- Succeeded by: Çağatay Erciyes

Personal details
- Born: January 23, 1957 (age 69) İzmir, Turkey
- Education: Ankara University

İnan Özyıldız (born January 23, 1957, İzmir) is a Turkish diplomat who served as Turkish ambassador to Lebanon from 2010 until 2015 and as Turkish ambassador to Estonia from 2020 until 2022.

== Early life and education ==
He graduated from Saint Joseph French High School and later from Ankara University Faculty of Political Science. He joined the Ministry of Foreign Affairs in 1986 and completed his studies at the College of Europe in Bruges between 1988 and 1989.

== Career ==
From 2000 to 2003, he served as the foreign affairs advisor to Ahmet Necdet Sezer, President of Turkey. Between 2003 and 2007, he held the position of minister-counselor at the Turkish Embassy in Paris. From 2008 to 2010, he served as Deputy Director General for Security Affairs at the Ministry of Foreign Affairs. He was appointed as the Turkish Ambassador to Beirut, serving from 2010 to 2015. Between 2017 and 2019, he held the position of Director General for Bilateral Political Affairs for the Americas at the Ministry of Foreign Affairs. On January 1, 2020, he was appointed as the Ambassador to Tallinn. He retired in January 2022 upon reaching the mandatory retirement age.

== Personal life ==
He is married and has one child. He is the brother of fellow ambassador Hasan Mehmet Özyıldız.
