= Serdar Kılıç =

Turkish diplomat and ambassador of Turkey to United States

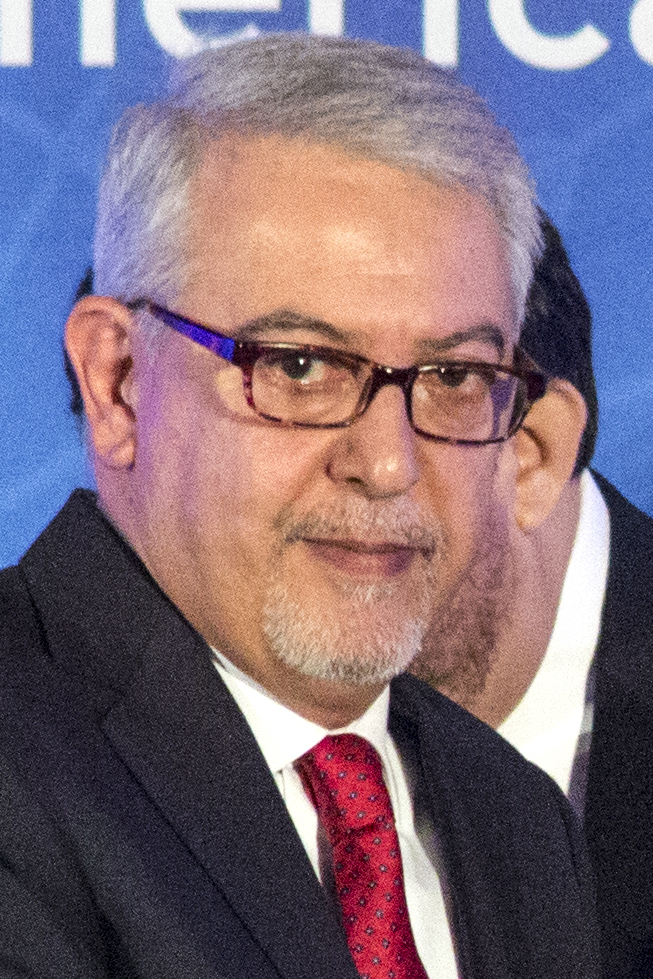

Turkish Ambassador to the United States
- In office 14 April 2014 – 2 March 2021
- Preceded by: Namık Tan
- Succeeded by: Murat Mercan

Turkish Ambassador to Japan
- In office 27 April 2012 – 16 April 2014
- Preceded by: Abdurrahman Bilgiç
- Succeeded by: Ahmet Bülent Meriç

Secretary-General of National Security Council
- In office 5 February 2010 – 17 April 2012
- Preceded by: Tahsin Burcuoğlu
- Succeeded by: Muammer Türker

Turkish Ambassador to Lebanon
- In office 28 March 2008 – 1 April 2010
- Preceded by: İrfan Acar
- Succeeded by: Süleyman İnan Özyıldız

Personal details
- Born: 28 March 1958 (age 68) Samsun, Turkey
- Spouse: Sinem Kılıç
- Children: 3
- Education: TED Ankara College; Ankara University
- Profession: Diplomat

Serdar Kılıç (born 28 March 1958) is a Turkish diplomat and the former ambassador of Turkey to United States. Kılıç previously served as the ambassador to Lebanon from 2008 to 2010 and the ambassador to Japan from 2012 to 2014.

== Biography ==
Kılıç was born in a city in north-central Turkey on the Black Sea called Samsun, March 28, 1958. He graduated from TED Ankara College and earned a bachelor's degree in political science from Ankara University.

In 1977, he started his professional career at the Turkish Ministry of Tourism and Culture. He then worked in the private sector as director of a construction company, Ekşioğlu Holding, from 1982. He worked at Turkey's Ministry of Foreign Affairs in 1984 and held various positions. His first assignment was to the Eastern Europe and Asia Department. In 1987, he was appointed Third Secretary at the Turkish Embassy in Kuwait. This represented his first assignment abroad. In 1989, he took up his first post in the US as Deputy Consul General in LA. He returned to his homeland in 1992 as second secretary and later as first secretary in the Gulf and Muslim Countries Division of the Ministry.

From 2006 to 2008 he was the head of NATO relations in the ministry. Kılıç was the ambassador of Turkey to Lebanon from 2008 to 2010. He served as the Secretary-General of Turkish National Security Council from 2010 to 2012. Kılıç served as the ambassador of Turkey to Japan from 2012 to 2014. He then served as the ambassador of Turkey to United States from April 2014 to March 2021.

In December 2021, it was announced that Kılıç would be Turkey's special envoy for the normalization of relations with Armenia.

== Personal life ==
Kılıç speaks fluent English. He is married to Zeliha Sinem Kılıç, with whom he has 3 children. His father (İlyas Kılıç) was a CHP member of parliament from Samsun. Kılıç is also a relative of AKP member of parliament from Samsun and former Minister of Youth and Sports Çağatay Kılıç.
