= List of ambassadors of Turkey to Israel =

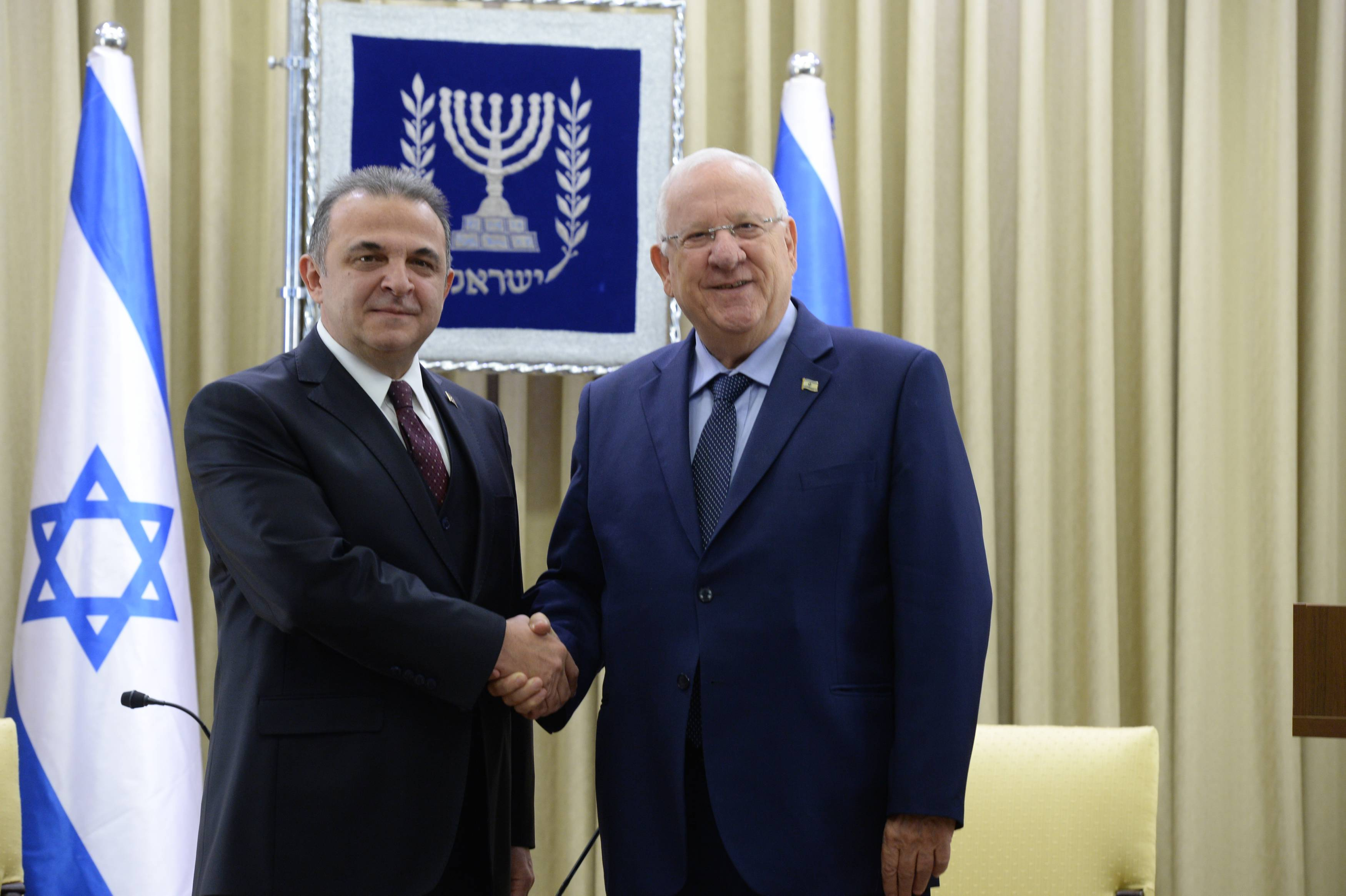
Turkish ambassador to Israel Kemal Ökem presents his letter of credence to the president of Israel Reuven Rivlin on 12 December 2016.

The ambassador of Turkey to Israel is the official envoy in Tel Aviv (Note: Turkey recognises Tel Aviv as Israel's capital.) who represents the Republic of Turkey and is accredited to the State of Israel as the resident representative of the government of Turkey.

Turkey currently has no ambassador in Israel.

== List of ambassadors ==
Ambassador	Term start	Term end	Ref.
Gündoğdu Üstün	1 January 1980	30 November 1980	
Ekrem Güvendiren	21 January 1992	1 May 1992	
Onur Gökçe	1 May 1992	31 May 1995	
M. Barlas Özener	1 June 1995	31 July 1999	
Ahmet Üzümcü	1 August 1999	30 June 2002	
Feridun H. Sinirlioğlu	30 June 2002	7 January 2007	
Namık Tan	21 January 2007	30 September 2009	
A. Oğuz Çelikkol	22 October 2009	16 November 2010	
Doğan Ferhat Işık	4 February 2014	17 August 2015	
Cem Utkan	1 September 2015	9 December 2016	
Mekin Mustafa Kemal Ökem	10 December 2016	16 April 2021	

== See also ==
- Israel–Turkey relations
