= Hasan Murat Mercan =

Turkish politician

- Education: Boğaziçi University; University of Florida

Hasan Murat Mercan (born January 14, 1959, Ağrı, Turkey) is a Turkish politician and diplomat who has served as the ambassador of Turkey to the United States from 15 March 2021 until 12 January 2024.

== Early life and academic career ==
Mercan's father was a doctor, and his mother was a housewife. He graduated from Eskişehir Anadolu High School in 1977. After completing his undergraduate studies in industrial engineering at the Faculty of Engineering at Boğaziçi University in 1981, Mercan obtained his master's degree from the same university in 1984. He then worked as a research assistant in the Department of Industrial Engineering at Anadolu University in Eskişehir, Turkey, where his family lived, from 1984 to 1985. During this period, he was sent to the University of Florida in the United States to pursue a Ph.D. He completed his Ph.D. in decision and information sciences at the University of Florida in 1989. He worked as an assistant professor in the Department of Quantitative Analysis at Cleveland State University's Faculty of Business from 1989 to 1992. After returning to Turkey, he worked as an assistant professor and later as an associate professor at Bilkent University's Faculty of Business Administration from 1992 to 2004.

== Political career ==
While he was an associate professor at Bilkent University in Ankara, he became a founding member of the Justice and Development Party (AKP). He was elected as a Member of Parliament from Eskişehir for the 22nd and 23rd terms. During the 22nd term, he served as the head of the Turkish delegation to the Parliamentary Assembly of the Council of Europe, and during the 23rd term, he chaired the Foreign Affairs Committee of the Turkish Grand National Assembly. On February 3, 2012, he was appointed as the Deputy Minister of Energy and Natural Resources, a position he resigned from on September 5, 2014.

On November 17, 2017, he was appointed as the ambassador of Turkey to Japan. After serving in this role for over three years, he was appointed as the ambassador of Turkey to the United States on February 23, 2021. He completed his term on January 12, 2024, and retired from the ministry on January 14, 2024.

== Personal life ==
Hasan Murat Mercan married İnci Mercan (born 1961), a fellow industrial engineer he met at the Department of Industrial Engineering at Anadolu University in Eskişehir. They have three children. His daughter, Saide Simin Mercan, married Justice and Development Party (AKP) politician Alparslan Bayraktar in 2018.
