= Anatolian Eagle =

Airforce exercise hosted by Turkey

Anatolian Eagle is an air force exercise hosted by the Turkish Air Force and held at 3rd Main Jet Base at Konya, Turkey. There are both national and international exercises held, the international exercises usually involving air arms of the United States, other NATO forces, and Asian countries.

== History ==
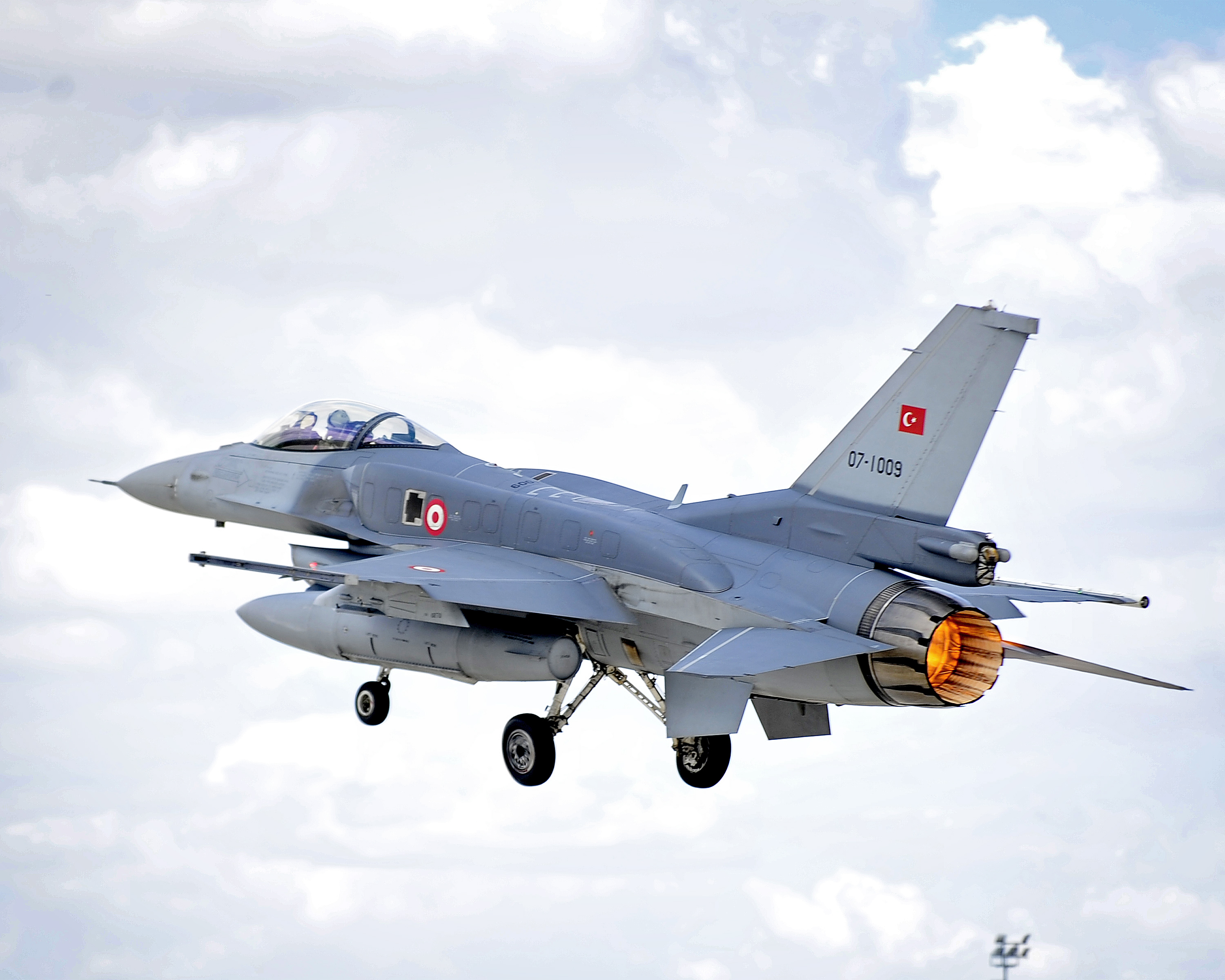
Turkish Air Force F-16C

With modernisation of infrastructure, weapons and training starting in the early 1980s, the Turkish Air Force (TAF) realised the philosophy that "no matter how modern the weapons are, it is men that use them." When the TAF gained experience during internal security operations and the Bosnia-Herzegovina and Kosovo Wars, it was decided that the TAF had reached a performance level where it could host the air forces of other countries in exercises and provide training to them. The Anatolian Eagle exercises are stated to be similar to the USA's Red Flag exercise at Nellis Air Force Base.

The TAF first sent observers to Red Flag in 1983 and participated for the first time in 1997 with six F-16s and 57 personnel. Two 'Flag' type exercises were held in 1998 called Anatolian Flag at Incirlik Air Base.

The first exercise, Anatolian Eagle 01, was held by TAF Operations Command on 18–29 June 2001. As well as Turkey, the air forces of the USA and Israel also participated. After the alleged coup attempt in 2016, no Anatolian Eagle exercises were held in 2017 and 2018, but they returned in 2019. In 2020 the COVID-19 pandemic meant another year without Anatolian Eagle, but since 2021 the exercise is held again.

== Description ==
Anatolian Eagle exercises simulate a wartime environment and the difficulty level increases from easy to hard. First, the training exercise is planned in the 'White Headquarters' building. Training is monitored with computers to help test knowledge, abilities and find deficiencies of the participants. The scenarios consist of a "Blue Team" which attacks tactical and strategic targets in a "Red Land" during Combined Air Operations (COMAO). The Red Land is defended by opposing combat aircraft and surface-to-air missile (SAM) systems. Statistical studies are also completed in the White Headquarters.

During the training exercise, the location, position and flight information of participating aircraft is transferred to a Command Control Centre (CCC) via an Air Combat Maneuvering Instrumentation (ACMI) system. Radar tracks and missile shots from SAM systems, AWACS aircraft, land-based radars and other anti-aircraft systems are also transferred to the CCC. Pre-flight briefings and post-flight debriefings are carried out in the CCC, where there is a briefing hall with capacity of 450 people. Sorties during the AE exercise are controlled and commanded at the MASE (Multi Aegis Site Emulator) Operation Center.

Airspace for Anatolian Eagle is 200 nm from east to west and 150 nm from north to south. The main operations' airspace, also known as the Salt Area, can be used from ground level up to 50,000 feet. During the exercise, AWACS aircraft give command and control support to the Blue Forces and a land-based radar gives GCI support to the Red Forces. Air-to-air refuelling tankers refuel aircraft of both forces.

SA-6, SA-8, SA-11, ZSU 23-4 and Hawk systems located at the Tersakan, Koc and Karapmar ranges are used to simulate realistic surface-to-air missile treats against exercise aircraft.

The Red Force personnel conduct their planning and briefings in the Red Building, while the national and foreign participants do the same in the Blue 1, Blue 2 and Blue 3 buildings. Red Force is restricted to their own Red Building, and nobody else can enter the Red Building. Participants are housed in dormitories.

== Politics ==
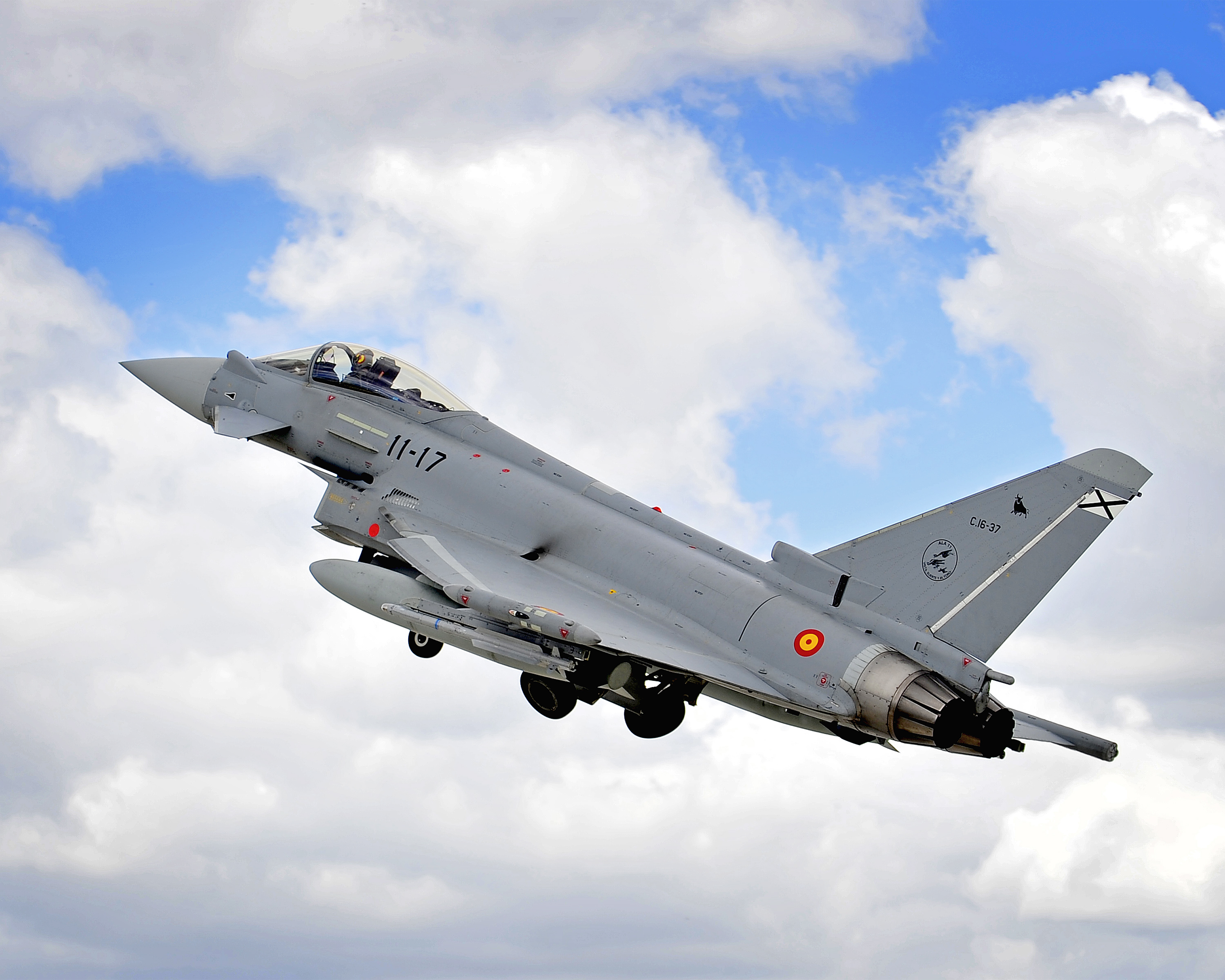
Spanish Air Force Eurofighter Typhoon

Turkey and Israel have historically had good relations, and Israel was a regular participant in Anatolian Eagle. However, three days before AE-09/3 was due to start, Turkey's ruling conservative government postponed the international part of the exercise planned with Italy, Israel, and the United States. Israeli officials were reported as saying that the decision was "sudden and unexpected" but that the Turks linked it to the involvement of the Israeli Air Force in the invasion of Gaza earlier that year. In January 2009, Turkish Prime Minister Recep Tayyip Erdoğan had criticised Israeli President Shimon Peres over the invasion; however, Turkey denied that the cancellation had been political.

Sukhoi Su-27 Flankers of the Chinese Air Force used the Konya facilities to exercise with Turkish F-4E Phantoms between 20 September and 4 October 2010. Turkey does not appear to regard these exercises as part of the official Anatolian Eagle series, despite the media reporting them as such. U.S. officials worried that the exercises would allow the Chinese access to Western technology and an understanding of NATO tactics.

== List of Anatolian Eagle exercises ==
Exercise	Dates held	Participating air arms	Notes
AE 01	18–29 June 2001	Turkey, Israel, USA	
AE 02/1	22 April – 3 May 2002	Turkey, USA	
AE 02/3	14–25 October 2002	Turkey, UAE, USA	
AE 03/3	3-14 November 2003	Turkey, Israel, Germany, USA	
AE 04/1	5-16 April 2004	National	
AE 04/2	7–18 June 2004	Turkey, Israel, Jordan, USA	
AE 04/3	27 September – 8 October 2004	Turkey, Germany, Israel, Italy, Netherlands, Pakistan, USA	
AE 05/1	4-15 April 2005	National	
AE-05/3	12–23 September 2005	Turkey, France, Italy, Netherlands.	
AE-05/4	14–25 November 2005	Turkey, Belgium, Israel, USA.	
AE-06/1	24 April-5 May 2006	National	
AE-06/2	12–22 June 2006	Turkey, France, NATO, Pakistan, USA	
AE-06/3	4-15 September 2006	Turkey, NATO	
AE-06/4	6-18 November 2006	Turkey, NATO, USA	
AE-07/2	11 – 22 June 2007	Turkey, Jordan, NATO, Pakistan, UK, USA	6x Tornado GR4 of 14 Sqn RAF
AE-07/3	3 – 14 September 2007	National	
AE-07/4	5 – 16 November 2007	National	
AE-08/1	5 – 16 May 2008	National	
AE-08/2	9 – 20 June 2008	Turkey, Jordan, NATO, UAE, USA	
AE-08/3	8 – 19 September 2008	Turkey, Israel, Italy, USA	
AE-08/4	3 – 14 November 2008	Turkey, Pakistan	
AE-09/1	27 April – 8 May 2009	National	
AE-09/2	8 – 19 June 2009	Turkey, Jordan, NATO, UAE, UK, USA	First participation in AE by RAF Typhoons.
AE-09/3	12 – 23 October 2009	Turkey, NATO	Israel, Italy, USA were excluded/withdrew at the last minute
AE-09/4	2 – 13 November 2009	Turkey, Pakistan	
AE-10/1	19–30 April 2010	National	
AE-10/2	7-18 June 2010	Turkey, Italy, Jordan, NATO, Spain, UAE, USA	
AE-10/3	11 – 22 October 2010	National	
AE-11/1	11–22 April 2011	National	
AE-11/2	13–24 June 2011	Turkey, USA, Saudi Arabia, Jordan, Pakistan, UAE, Italy	
AE-12/1	2-13 April 2012	Turkey	
AE-12/2	11–22 June 2012	Turkey, Saudi Arabia, Jordan, Pakistan, UAE, Italy	
AE-12/3	24 September – 5 October 2012	Turkey	
AE-13/1	15–26 April 2013	Turkey	
AE-13/2	10–21 June 2013	Turkey, Saudi Arabia, UAE	
AE-14/1	7-18 April 2014	Turkey	
AE-14/2	9-20 June 2014	Turkey, USA, Jordan, Qatar, Spain, UK, NATO	
AE-15/1	8-19 June 2015	Turkey, Germany, NATO, Pakistan, Spain, UK, USA	
AE-16	30 May – 10 June 2016	Turkey, Italy, Jordan, NATO, Netherlands, Pakistan, Saudi Arabia	
AE-19	17 – 28 June 2019	Turkey, Italy, Jordan, NATO, Pakistan, Qatar, USA	Azerbaijan (observer nation) First participation in AE by Pakistani AF JF-17 Thunders
AE-21	21 June – 02 July 2021	Turkey, Azerbaijan, NATO, Pakistan, Qatar	
AE-22	20 June - 01 July 2022	Turkey, Azerbaijan, Pakistan, Jordan, UK, NATO	Pakistan Air Force participated with 6x General Dynamics F-16 Fighting Falcons from 11 Squadron, Royal Jordanian Air Force participation consisted of 3 F-16s from 1 Squadron, the RAF sent 4 Typhoons from 3 Squadron and 2 Su-25s formed the Azerbaijan delegation
