= Namık Tan =

Turkish diplomat (born 1956)

Namık Tan MP
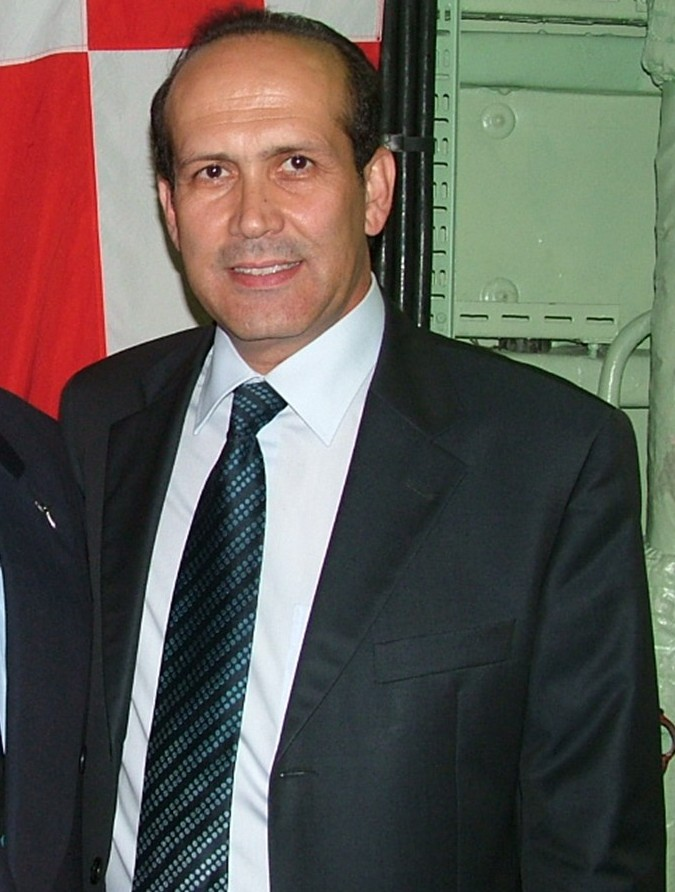

Member of the Grand National Assembly
- Incumbent
- Assumed office 2 June 2023
- Constituency: İstanbul (II) (2023)

Ambassador of Turkey to United States
- In office 25 February 2010 – 31 March 2014
- Preceded by: Nabi Şensoy
- Succeeded by: Serdar Kılıç

Ambassador of Turkey to Israel
- In office 22 January 2007 – 23 July 2009
- Preceded by: Feridun Sinirlioğlu
- Succeeded by: Oğuz Çelikkol

Personal details
- Born: 1956 (age 69–70) Mardin, Turkey
- Party: Republican People's Party
- Education: TED Ankara College; Ankara University

Namık Tan (born 1956 in Mardin, Turkey) is a Turkish politician and former diplomat. He joined the Ministry of Foreign Affairs in 1982 and was its spokesman for 2004 to 2007, ambassador to Israel from 2007 to 2009 and ambassador to the United States from 2010 to March 2014. He has sat at the Grand National Assembly of Turkey for Istanbul (II) since 2023. Elected on the Republican People's Party (CHP) list, he served as the party's deputy chairman for foreign affairs from April 2025. In July 2026 he left the CHP with Özgür Özel and about ninety other deputies to found Yeni Parti.

== Early life ==
Tan's family traces its ancestral roots to Bulgaria, Greece, Ossetia and Syria. He became interested in diplomacy at a young age. His father was a Turkish administrator and his work required the family to move around frequently. This broad exposure prompted Tan to take the foreign service examination. He studied law but did not become a lawyer.

== Diplomatic career ==
=== Early career ===
Tan entered the Ministry of Foreign Affairs in 1982 and held posts in Ankara, Moscow and Abu Dhabi. At the embassy in Washington he was counsellor from 1991 to 1995 and first counsellor from 1997 to 2001. In the years between he was chief of cabinet to the foreign minister. After returning to Turkey in 2001 he headed the ministry's American department then its Information Department in 2002 and was ministry's spokesman from 2004 to 2007.

=== Ambassador to Israel ===
Namık Tan was appointed as the Turkish Ambassador to Tel Aviv in December 2006, replacing Feridun Sinirlioğlu. On January 22, 2007, he presented his letter of credence to Israeli President Moshe Katsav and began his new assignment. During his tenure as ambassador, diplomatic relations between Israel and Turkey were at a normal level, but were hit by the Davos Crisis between Recep Tayyip Erdoğan and Shimon Peres in early 2009. Tan was appointed Deputy Undersecretary of the Ministry of Foreign Affairs in July 2009.

=== Ambassador to the United States ===
Namık Tan was appointed to this position after the resignation of Ambassador to Washington Nabi Şensoy in December 2009. On February 25, 2010, he presented his letter of credence to President Barack Obama and began his new assignment. After four years in office, he was transferred to the central office by decree dated March 17, 2014. After being transferred to the center, Tan retired and was elected as a member of the board of directors of the construction company STFA Group.

== Political career ==
=== Election to parliament ===
Tan had no previous party post when Kemal Kılıçdaroğlu,then CHP leader, placed him first on the party's Istanbul (II) list for the May 2023 election. He was elected and named the leader's chief advisor for foreign relations. He sits on the embassy's Foreign Affairs Committee.

=== Blue Homeland remarks ===
In July 2024, during a debate on a motion on Turkey's military presence in Somalia, Tan said on behalf of the CHP that the government has quickly abandoned what he called the "Blue Homeland fable" (''Mavi Vatan masalı''), a reference to the maritime jurisdiction doctrine associated with Turkish nationalist and naval circles. The AKP spokesman Ömer Çelik, called the remark unacceptable and irresponsible. The CHP spokesman Deniz Yücel said the passage had been taken out of context and called on Çelik to apologies.

=== CHP deputy chairman ===
After the CHP's 21st extraordinary congress in April 2025, Özel named Tan deputy chairman for foreign affairs replacing İlhan Uzgel. In that role he represented the party at meetings abroad, including a congress in Sulaymaniyah, Iraqi Kurdistan, in August 2025, where he met Iraqi President Abdul Latif Rashid.

=== Founding Yeni Parti ===
On 21 May 2026 a court ruled the CHP's 2023 congress, at which Özel had been elected leader, null and void, which reinstated Kılıçdaroğlu as chairman. On 24 July 2026 Tan was among 91 deputies who resigned from the CHP and signed a founding petition of Yeni Parti under Özel. He was a member of its founding Party Assembly but not of its nine member interim executive.

== See also ==
- List of Turkish diplomats

Diplomatic posts
Preceded by Nabi Şensoy	Ambassador of Turkey to United States; 2010-2014	Succeeded by Serdar Kılıç
Preceded by Feridun Sinirlioğlu	Ambassador of Turkey to Israel; 2007-2009	Succeeded by Ahmet Oğuz Çelikkol
