= Coalition governments in Turkey =

Below is the list of coalition governments in the history of Turkey.

== The list ==
No of government	Dates	Prime minister	Party of the prime minister	Partners
26	30 November 1961 – 25 June 1962	İsmet İnönü	CHP	AP
27	25 June 1962 – 25 December 1963	İsmet İnönü	CHP	YTP-CKMP
28	25 December 1963 – 20 Feb. 1965	İsmet İnönü	CHP	Indep.
29	20 February 1965 – 27 October 1965	Suat Hayri Ürgüplü	None; technocratic	AP-YTP-MP2-CKMP
33	26 March 1971 – 11 December 1971	Nihat Erim	None; technocratic	AP-CHP-CGP
34	11 December 1971 – 17 April 1972	Nihat Erim	None; technocratic	AP-CHP-CGP
35	17 April 1972 – 15 April 1973	Ferit Melen	CGP	AP-CHP
36	15 April 1973 – 25 January 1974	Naim Talu	None; technocratic	AP-CGP
37	25 January 1974 – 17 November 1974	Bülent Ecevit	CHP	MSP
38	17 November 1974 – 31 March 1975	Sadi Irmak	None	CGP
39 (Note: Popularly known as 1.MC, (First Nationalist Front))	31 March 1975 – 21 June 1977	Süleyman Demirel	AP	MSP-CGP-MHP
41 (Note: Popularly known as 2.MC, (Second National Front))	21 July 1977 – 5 January 1978	Süleyman Demirel	AP	MSP-MHP
42	5 January 1978 – 12 November 1979	Bülent Ecevit	CHP	Indep.-CGP-DP
49	20 November 1991 – 16 May 1993	Süleyman Demirel	DYP	SHP
50	25 June 1993 – 5 October 1995	Tansu Çiller	DYP	SHP
52	30 October 1995 – 6 March 1996	Tansu Çiller	DYP	CHP
53 (Note: Popularly known as Anayol)	6 March 1996 – 28 June 1996	Mesut Yılmaz	ANAP	DYP
54 (Note: Popularly known as Refahyol)	28 June 1996 – 30 June 1997	Necmettin Erbakan	RP	DYP
55 (Note: Popularly known as Anasol-D)	30 June 1997 – 11 January 1999	Mesut Yılmaz	ANAP	DSP-DTP
57 (Note: Popularly known as Üçlü koalisyon (Triple coalition))	28 May 1999 – 18 November 2002	Bülent Ecevit	DSP	MHP-ANAP
63 (Note: Provisional government)	28 August 2015 - 17 November 2015	Ahmet Davutoğlu	AKP	HDP

== Key ==
CHP:
CKMP:
MP2:
YTP:
AP:
MHP:
MGP
CGP:
DP
MSP:
RP:
DSP:
ANAP:
DYP:
SHP:
DTP:

Republican People's Party
Republican Peasants' Nation Party
Nation Party (Turkey, 1962)
New Turkey Party (1961)
Justice Party (Turkey)
Nationalist Movement Party
National Reliance Party
Republican Reliance Party
Democratic Party
National Salvation Party
Welfare Party
Democratic Left Party (Turkey)
Motherland Party (Turkey)
True Path Party
Social Democratic Populist Party (Turkey)
Democrat Turkey Party

== See also ==
- Politics of Turkey
- List of cabinets of Turkey
- List of prime ministers of Turkey
