= Ümit Haluk Bayülken =

Turkish politician

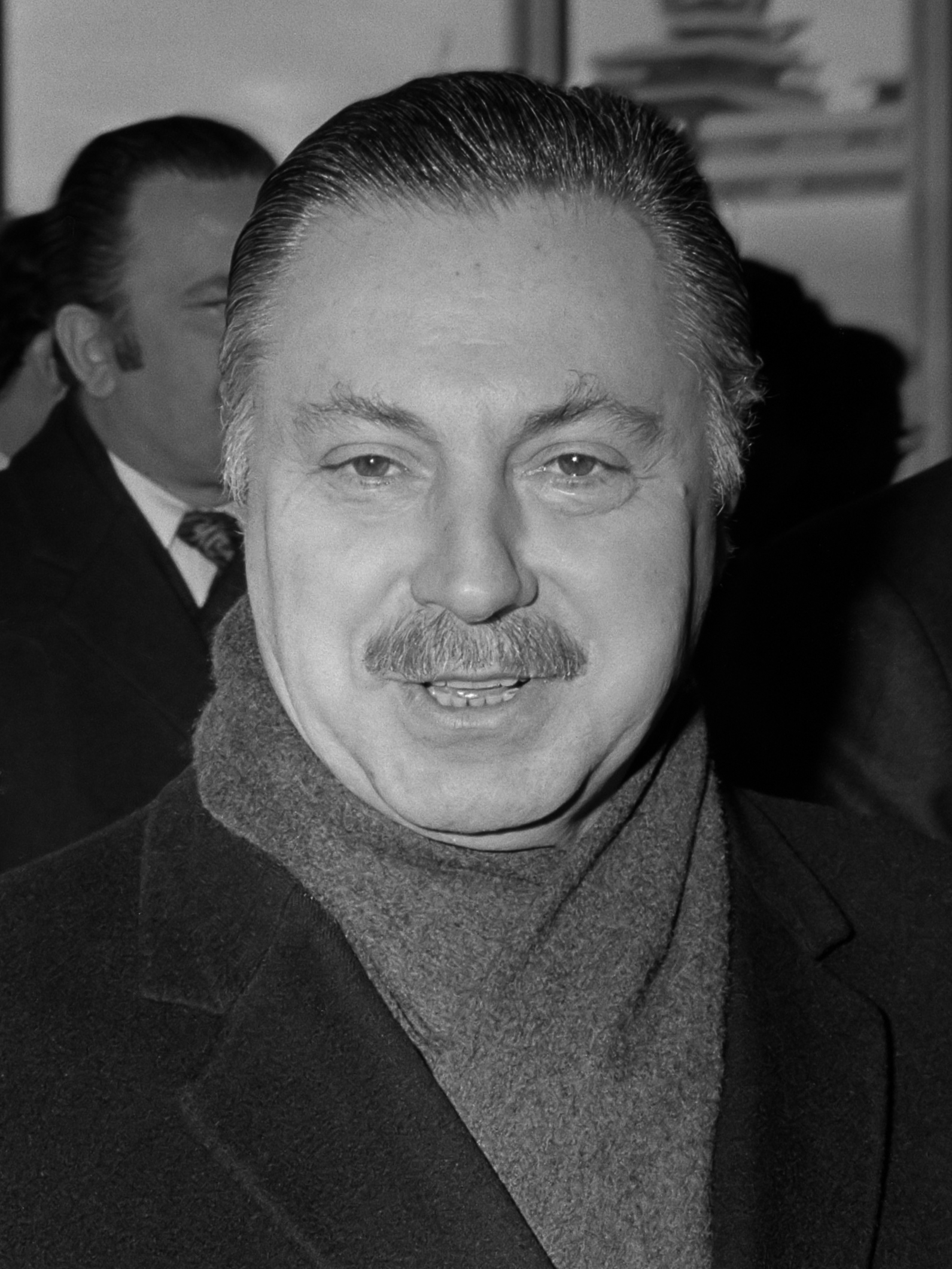
- Ümit Haluk Bayülken (1972)

Deputy of Antalya
- In office 6 November 1983 – 29 November 1987

Minister of National Defense
- In office 20 September 1980 – 13 December 1983
- Prime Minister: Bülent Ulusu
- Preceded by: Ahmet İhsan Birincioğlu
- Succeeded by: Zeki Yavuztürk

Ministry of Foreign Affairs
- In office 11 December 1971 – 26 January 1974
- Prime Minister: Nihat Erim (11 December 1971 – 22 May 1972); Ferit Melen (22 May 1972 – 15 April 1973); Naim Talu (15 April 1973 – 26 January 1974)
- Preceded by: Osman Esim Olcay
- Succeeded by: Turan Güneş

Turkey Ambassador to the United Kingdom
- In office 14 July 1966 – 2 July 1969
- President: Cevdet Sunay
- Preceded by: Zeki Kuneralp
- Succeeded by: Zeki Kuneralp

Personal details
- Born: 7 July 1921 Constantinople, Ottoman Empire
- Died: 26 April 2007 (aged 85) Ankara, Turkey
- Resting place: Karşıyaka Cemetery, Ankara
- Party: Independent
- Education: Haydarpaşa High School
- Alma mater: Ankara University, Faculty of Political Sciences
- Occupation: Politician
- Profession: Diplomat

Ümit Haluk Bayülken (7 July 1921 – 26 April 2007) was a Turkish diplomat, ambassador, politician, former Minister of Foreign Affairs and Minister of National Defense of Turkey.

== Personal life ==
Ümit Haluk Bayülken was born in Constantinople, Ottoman Empire on 7 July 1921. After finishing Haydarpaşa High School, Istanbul in 1939, he was educated in the Faculty of Political Science of Ankara University graduating as the first in class in 1943. Between 1945 and 1947, he completed the military service.

He was married to Fatma Valih and father of two.

Bayülken died on 26 April 2007 in Ankara. He was buried at Karşıyaka Cemetery following a ceremony held in front of the building of the Ministry of Foreign Affairs attended by high-ranking politicians, diplomats and civil servants, and the religious funereal service at Kocatepe Mosque.

== Diplomat ==
He entered the service of the Ministry of Foreign Affairs in 1943. After serving in many positions at various departments. Between 1963 and 1966, Bayülken taught "Applied International Law and Disputes" at the Faculty of Political Science of his alma mater. In July 1966, he was appointed ambassador to London. He became the Permanent Representative of Turkey to the United Nations in August 1969. He was elected Secretary General of CENTO (Central Treaty Organization) in November 1974.

He is remembered for his reaching a helping hand to some 20,000 immigrants of Turkish origin while serving as Consul General in Frankfurt, West Germany in 1947.

== Politician ==
Although not a member of the parliament, he was appointed Minister of Foreign Affairs in the 34th, 35th and the 36th government of Turkey serving between 11 December 1971 and 26 January 1974. In 1974, he was appointed Secretary General of the President of Turkey Fahri Korutürk serving until 1980.

According to the Turkish constitution of 1961, the president was authorized to appoint 15 members of the Senate of the Republic (Turkey). On 16 May 1980, Bayülken was appointed senator by the contingency of the acting president İhsan Sabri Çağlayangil. However, by the 1980 Turkish coup d'état on 12 September, he lost his seat.

During the 44th government of Turkey between 20 September 1980 and 13 December 1983, he was appointed as the Minister of National Defense. He served in this position until the general election of November 6, 1983.

Following the 1983 general election, Bayülken entered the 17th Parliament of Turkey as an independent deputy of Antalya Province.
