= Atilla Karaosmanoğlu =

Turkish economist and politician

Deputy Prime Minister of Turkey
- In office 26 March 1971 – 3 December 1971 Serving with Sadi Koçaş
- Prime Minister: Nihat Erim

Personal details
- Born: 20 September 1932 Manisa, Turkey
- Died: 11 November 2013 (aged 81) Istanbul, Turkey
- Party: Independent
- Spouse: Şükriye
- Education: Mekteb-i Mülkiye (BS); Istanbul University (PhD)
- Occupation: Economist; politician

Atilla Karaosmanoğlu (20 September 1932 – 11 November 2013) was a Turkish economist and politician.

== Background ==
Karosmanoğlu was born in Manisa, Turkey in 1931. After graduating from the Faculty of Political Sciences of Ankara University in 1954, he earned a doctorate at the Faculty of Economics at Istanbul University. He later served as part-time lecturer at New York University and Harvard University.

== Professional life ==
After returning to Turkey, Karosmanoğlu served as a manager of the State Planning Organization of Turkey. He also served as a senior advisor of the Organisation for Economic Co-operation and Development (OECD).

In 1966, he began working for the World Bank. In 1971, Prime Minister Nihat Erim invited him to Ankara and appointed him as deputy prime minister (responsible of the economy) in Erim's technocratic government on 26 March 1971. However, on 3 December 1971, Karaosmanoğlu, together with 10 other ministers, resigned from his post, claiming that he was unable to carry on the reforms he had promised. According to journalist Metin Toker, Karaosmanoğlu cited disagreements within the cabinet and especially between his ministry and the Ministry of Finance.

In later years, Karosmanoğlu returned to his position in the World Bank. His second term in the bank continued for 22 years and he eventually rose to become the vice president of the bank. He retired on 30 November 1994.

== Death ==
Karosmanoğlu died from respiratory failure on 11 November 2013. He was buried in Çengelköy cemetery in Istanbul.

A memorial fund was created in his name with Turkish Philanthropy Funds to give scholarships through Association for the Support of Contemporary Living (Turkish: Çağdaş Yaşamı Destekleme Derneği).
