= List of ministers of national defense of Turkey =

The following is a list of ministers of national defense of Turkey.

No.	Portrait	Minister	Term of office		Political party
1		Fevzi Çakmak	3 May 1920	5 August 1921	Independent
2		Refet Bele	5 August 1921	10 January 1922	Independent
3		Kazım Özalp	10 January 1922	21 November 1924	Republican People's Party
4		Fethi Okyar	22 November 1924	3 March 1925	Republican People's Party
5		Recep Peker	4 March 1925	1 November 1927	Republican People's Party
6		Abdülhalik Renda	1 November 1927	25 December 1930	Republican People's Party
7		Zekai Apaydın	29 December 1930	1 March 1935	Republican People's Party
(3)		Kazım Özalp	1 March 1935	18 January 1939	Republican People's Party
8		Naci Tınaz	18 January 1939	5 April 1940	Republican People's Party
9		Saffet Arıkan	5 April 1940	12 November 1941	Republican People's Party
10		Ali Rıza Artunkal	12 November 1941	7 August 1946	Republican People's Party
11		Cemil Cahit Toydemir	7 August 1946	5 September 1947	Republican People's Party
12		Münir Birsel	5 September 1947	5 June 1948	Republican People's Party
—		Hasan Saka; Acting Minister	5 June 1948	10 June 1948	Republican People's Party
13		Hüseyin Hüsnü Çakır	10 June 1948	22 May 1950	Republican People's Party
14		Refik Şevket İnce	22 May 1950	9 March 1951	Democrat Party
15		Ahmet Hulusi Köymen	9 March 1951	10 December 1952	Democrat Party
16		Seyfi Kurtbek	10 December 1952	1 November 1953	Democrat Party
17		Kenan Yılmaz	1 November 1953	17 May 1954	Democrat Party
18		Ethem Menderes	17 May 1954	15 September 1955	Democrat Party
—		Mehmet Fuat Köprülü; Acting Minister	15 September 1955	9 December 1955	Democrat Party
—		Adnan Menderes; Acting Minister	9 December 1955	28 July 1957	Democrat Party
19		Hasan Şemi Ergin	28 July 1957	19 January 1958	Democrat Party
(18)		Ethem Menderes	19 January 1958	27 May 1960	Democrat Party
20		Cemal Gürsel	30 May 1960	9 June 1960	Military
21		Hüseyin Ataman	22 October 1960	5 January 1961	Military
22		Muzaffer Alankuş	5 January 1961	3 July 1961	Military
23		İlhami Sancar	20 November 1961	20 February 1965	Republican People's Party
24		Hasan Dinçer	20 February 1965	10 August 1965	Justice Party
25		Mustafa Hazım Dağlı	10 August 1965	27 October 1965	Justice Party
26		Ahmet Topaloğlu	27 October 1965	26 March 1971	Justice Party
27		Ferit Melen	26 March 1971	22 May 1972	Republican Reliance Party
28		Mehmet İzmen	22 May 1972	15 April 1973	Justice Party
(23)		İlhami Sancar	15 April 1973	26 January 1974	Republican People's Party
29		Hasan Esat Işık	26 January 1974	17 November 1974	Republican People's Party
(23)		İlhami Sancar	17 November 1974	31 March 1975	Republican People's Party
(27)		Ferit Melen	31 March 1975	21 June 1977	Republican Reliance Party
(29)		Hasan Esat Işık	21 June 1977	21 July 1977	Republican People's Party
30		Sadettin Bilgiç	21 July 1977	18 October 1977	Justice Party
—		Cihat Bilgehan; Acting Minister	14 October 1977	28 October 1977	Justice Party
31		Turhan Kapanlı	1 November 1977	5 January 1978	Justice Party
(29)		Hasan Esat Işık	5 January 1978	16 January 1979	Republican People's Party
32		Neşet Akmandor	16 January 1979	12 November 1979	Republican People's Party
33		Ahmet İhsan Birincioğlu	12 November 1979	12 September 1980	Justice Party
34		Ümit Haluk Bayülken	20 September 1980	13 December 1983	Independent
35		Zeki Yavuztürk	13 December 1983	21 December 1987	Motherland Party
36		Ercan Vuralhan	21 December 1987	30 March 1989	Motherland Party
37		Safa Giray	30 March 1989	19 October 1990	Motherland Party
—		Güneş Taner; Acting Minister	19 October 1990	28 October 1990	Motherland Party
38		Hüsnü Doğan	28 October 1990	22 February 1991	Motherland Party
39		Mehmet Yazar	1 March 1991	23 June 1991	Motherland Party
40		Barlas Doğu	23 June 1991	20 November 1991	Motherland Party
41		Nevzat Ayaz	20 November 1991	24 October 1993	True Path Party
42		Mehmet Gölhan	24 October 1993	5 October 1995	True Path Party
43		Vefa Tanır	5 October 1995	6 March 1996	True Path Party
44		Mahmut Oltan Sungurlu	6 March 1996	28 June 1996	Motherland Party
45		Turhan Tayan	28 June 1996	30 June 1997	True Path Party
46		İsmet Sezgin	30 June 1997	11 January 1999	Democrat Turkey Party
47		Hikmet Sami Türk	11 January 1999	28 May 1999	Democratic Left Party
48		Sabahattin Çakmakoğlu	28 May 1999	18 November 2002	Nationalist Movement Party
49		Vecdi Gönül	18 November 2002	6 July 2011	Justice and Development Party
50		İsmet Yılmaz	6 July 2011	1 July 2015	Justice and Development Party
(49)		Vecdi Gönül	3 July 2015	24 November 2015	Justice and Development Party
(50)		İsmet Yılmaz	24 November 2015	24 May 2016	Justice and Development Party
51		Fikri Işık	24 May 2016	19 July 2017	Justice and Development Party
52		Nurettin Canikli	19 July 2017	10 July 2018	Justice and Development Party
53		Hulusi Akar	10 July 2018	3 June 2023	Justice and Development Party
54		Yaşar Güler	3 June 2023	Incumbent	Justice and Development Party

== See also ==
- Ministry of National Defense (Turkey)
