= Ulus (newspaper) =

Turkish newspaper (1934–1971)

- 1 December 1934 issue of Ulus
- Type: Daily
- Format: Broadsheet
- Owner: Republican People's Party (CHP)
- Founded: 29 November 1934
- Ceased publication: 1953, 1971
- Relaunched: 10 June 1955
- Political alignment: Kemalist
- Language: Turkish
- Headquarters: Ankara

Ulus was a Turkish newspaper published between 1934 and 1971 in Ankara, Turkey, with some interruptions.

== Naming ==
Ulus means "nation" in Turkish. It was owned and published by the Republican People's Party (CHP) which was founded by Turkish nationalists during the Turkish War of Independence in the 1920s.

== History ==
=== First term ===
Ulus was founded on 29 November 1934 as a successor to Hakimiyet-i Milliye. It was owned by the CHP. After the party was defeated in the 1950 elections, the new ruling party, Democrat Party decided to expropriate all property CHP owned on the ground that the property had been acquired during the single-party regime (1923–1945). On 17 December 1953, the infrastructure of the newspaper such as the building and the publishing equipment was expropriated and the newspaper was closed.

=== Second term ===
Although the newspaper was closed, the party still owned the royalty, but because of financial problems, Ulus could not be published for one and a half years. During this period Nihat Erim a member of the party (and a future prime minister) published his own newspaper (named Yeni Ulus and later Halkçı) as a replacement. Finally on 10 June 1955 Ulus began its second publishing term. One of the contributors was Hüsnü A. Göksel between 1961 and 1963 who also served as its correspondent while studying in the US in the late 1950s.

== Aftermath ==
In 1971, CHP sold the newspaper to a publisher who changed the name of the newspaper to Barış. In 2008 it was renamed as Ulus.
