= 34th government of Turkey =

Government of the Republic of Turkey (1971-1972)

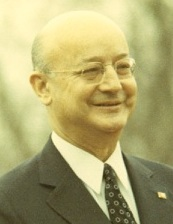
Nihat Erim

The 34th government of Turkey (11 December 1971 – 22 May 1972) was a government in the history of Turkey. It is also called the second Erim government.

== Background ==
Eleven members of the previous government, resigned claiming that they could not carry the reforms they had promised. After this resignation, Nihat Erim also resigned on 3 December 1971. However, the president Cevdet Sunay appointed Nihat Erim for the second time. The second Erim government, like the previous one, was a semi-technocratic government and the partners were Republican People's Party (CHP), Justice Party (AP), and National Reliance Party (MGP)

== The government ==
Title	Name	Party
Prime Minister	Nihat Erim	Ind
Minister of State
Minister of State	Ali İhsan Göğüş	MGP
Minister of State	Doğan Kitaplı	AP
Minister of State	İlhan Öztrak	Indep
Minister of State	İlyas Karagöz	AP
Ministry of Justice	Suat Bilge	Indep
Ministry of National Defense	Ferit Melen	MGP
Ministry of the Interior	Ferit Kubat	Indep
Ministry of Foreign Affairs	Ümit Haluk Bayülken	Indep
Ministry of Finance and Customs	Sait Naci Elgin	Indep
Ministry of National Education	İsmail Arar	CHP
Ministry of Public Works	Mukadder Öztekin	CHP
Ministry of Construction and Settlement	Serbülent Bingöl	Indep
Ministry of Health and Social Security	Cevdet Aykan	Indep
Ministry of Agriculture	Orhan Dikmen	Indep
Ministry of Village Affairs	Necmi Sönmez	Indep
Ministry of Forestry	Selahattin İnal	Indep
Ministry of Transport	Rıfkı Danışman	AP
Ministry of Labour	Ali Rıza Uzuner	CHP
Ministry of Commerce	Naim Talu	Indep
Ministry of Industry and Technology	Ali Mesut Erez	AP
Ministry of Customs and Monopolies	Haydar Özalp	AP
Ministry Tourism	Erol Yılmaz Akçal	AP
Ministry of Energy and Natural Resources	Nezih Devres	Indep
Ministry of Youth and Sports	Adnan karaküçük	AP

== Aftermath ==
Nihat Erim resigned on 27 March 1972, but continued to serve as caretaker prime minister until the formation of the next government. After Suat Hayri Ürgüplü's unsuccessful efforts, the next government was founded by Ferit Melen, a member of the first and the second Erim governments.

Preceded by 33rd government of Turkey (Nihat Erim)	34th Government of Turkey; 11 December 1971 - 22 May 1972	Succeeded by 35th government of Turkey (Ferit Melen)
