= Ali İhsan Göğüş =

Turkish politician

Minister of Tourism
- In office 25 December 1963 – 20 February 1965
- Prime Minister: İsmet İnönü
- Preceded by: Nurettin Ardıçoğlu
- Succeeded by: Ömer Zekai Dorman

Minister of State
- In office 11 December 1971 – 22 May 1972
- Prime Minister: Nihat Erim
- Preceded by: Talat Halman
- Succeeded by: Erol Yılmaz Akçal

Personal details
- Born: 1923 Gaziantep
- Died: July 22, 2011 (aged 87–88) Istanbul, Turkey
- Education: Istanbul University School of Letters
- Occupation: Politician
- Profession: Journalist

Ali İhsan Göğüş (1923 – 22 July 2011) was a Turkish journalist, politician and former government minister.

== Life ==
Ali İhsan Göğüş was born in Gaziantep in 1923. He completed the Kabataş High School in Istanbul, and graduated from the School of Letters of Istanbul University. In 1951, he married Nezahat Alemdar Göğüş. He is the father of Zeynep Göğüş, a journalist. Göğüş died in Istanbul on 22 July 2011.

== Journalism career ==
He served as the editor-in-chief of Türk Haberler Ajansı ("Turkish News Agency"), and the newspapers Dünya, Akşam and Cumhuriyet. He also served as the editor of the periodical Kim. Between 1984 and 1990, he was the vice speaker of Radio and Television Supreme Council.

== Politics ==
In 1945, he joined the Republican People's Party (CHP). In 1961, he was nominated for the Constituent Assembly of Turkey by the CHP. In the next three terms during the 12th, 13th and the 14th Parliament of Turkey between 15 October 1961 and 5 June 1977, he was a deputy of the CHP from Gaziantep Province. In the 28th government of Turkey, he was appointed Minister of Tourism serving between 25 December 1963 and 20 February 1965. During the split in the CHP, he left the party and joined the Republican Reliance Party (CGP). In the 34th government of Turkey between 11 December 1971 and 22 May 1972, he was the Minister of State.
