= 36th government of Turkey =

Government of the Republic of Turkey (1973-1974)

The 36th government of Turkey (15 April 1973 – 26 January 1974) was a government in the history of Turkey. It is also called the Talu government.

== Background ==
After Fahri Korutürk was elected the president of Turkey, the previous prime minister Ferit Melen resigned. Korutürk appointed Naim Talu, an independent who had been the Minister of Commerce in the Melen government, as the new prime minister. Naim Talu formed his government with the support of the Justice Party (AP) and the Republican Reliance Party (CGP).

== The government ==
Title	Name	Party
Prime Minister	Naim Talu	Indep
Minister of State
Minister of State	Kemal Satır	CGP
Minister of State	Nizamettin Erkmen	AP
Minister of State	İlhan Öztrak	Indep
Minister of State	İsmail Hakkı Tekinel	Indep
Ministry of Justice	Hayri Mumcuoğlu	Indep
Ministry of National Defense	İlhami Sancar	CGP
Ministry of the Interior	Mukadder Öztekin	Indep
Ministry of Foreign Affairs	Ümit Haluk Bayülken	Indep
Ministry of Finance and Customs	Sadık Tekin Müftüoğlu	AP
Ministry of National Education	Orhan Dengiz	AP
Ministry of Public Works	Nurettin Ok	AP
Ministry of Construction and Settlement	Nebil Oktay	CGP
Ministry of Health and Social Security	Vefa Tanır	CGP
Ministry of Agriculture	Ahmet Nusret Tuna	AP
Ministry of Village Affairs	Orhan Kürümoğlu	AP
Ministry of Forestry	İsa Bingöl	AP
Ministry of Transport	Sabahattin Özbek	Indep
Ministry of Labour	Ali Naili Erdem	AP
Ministry of Commerce	Ahmet Türkel	AP
Ministry of Industry and Technology	Nuri Bayar	AP
Ministry of Customs and Monopolies	Fethi Çelikbaş	CGP
Ministry Tourism	Ahmet İhsan Kırımlı	AP
Ministry of Energy and Natural Resources	Kemal Demir	CGP
Ministry of Youth and Sports	Celalettin Bingöl	AP

== Aftermath ==
The government ended by the general elections held on 14 October 1973.

Preceded by 35th government of Turkey (Ferit Melen)	36th Government of Turkey; 15 April 1973 - 26 January 1974	Succeeded by 37th government of Turkey (Bülent Ecevit)
