= Ziya Müezzinoğlu =

Turkish economist, diplomat and politician (1919–2020)

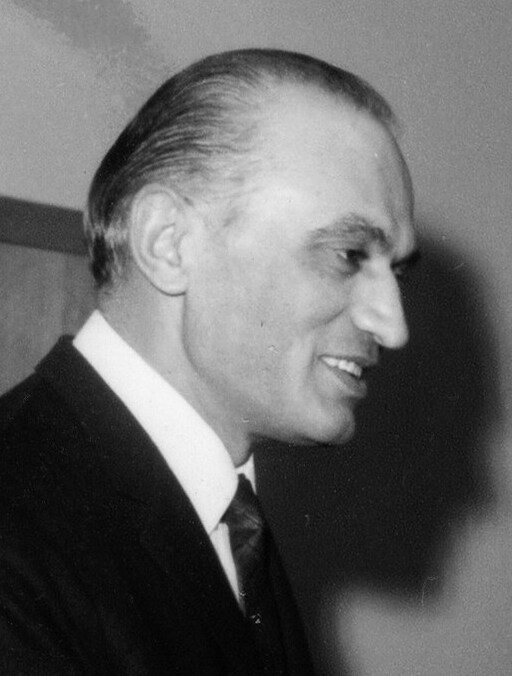

Minister of Finance
- In office 5 January 1978 – 1979
- Prime Minister: Bülent Ecevit

Minister of Commerce
- In office 21 June 1977 – 27 July 1977
- President: Fahri Korutürk
- Prime Minister: Bülent Ecevit

Minister of Finance
- In office 2 May 1972 – 1973
- Prime Minister: Ferit Melen

Personal details
- Born: 5 May 1919 Kayseri, Ottoman Empire
- Died: 13 June 2020 (aged 101) Antalya, Turkey
- Party: Republican People's Party
- Children: 2
- Education: Ankara University

Ziya Müezzinoğlu (1919–2020) was a Turkish economist, diplomat and politician. He held various posts, including ambassador of Turkey to West Germany and minister of finance.

== Early life and education ==
Müezzinoğlu was born in Kayseri on 5 May 1919. He was educated at the Faculty of Political Science, Ankara University.

== Career ==
After his graduation in 1942 Müezzinoğlu joined at the Ministry of Finance where he first worked in the Finance Inspection Board. He became an inspectorate of finance in 1946. Between 1959 and 1960 he served as the director general of the treasury. Following the military coup on 27 May 1960 he was elected to the Constituent Assembly. In 1962 he was appointed undersecretary of the State Planning Organization which he held until 1964 when he was named as the ambassador of Turkey to West Germany. From January 1967 he served as the permanent representative of Turkey at the European Economic Community. The same year he also became the representative of Turkey at the European Coal and Steel Union and the European Atomic Energy Community.

On 22 May 1972 Müezzinoğlu was appointed finance minister to the cabinet led by Prime Minister Ferit Melen and remained in office until 1973. Following the military intervention of Turkey in Cyprus Müezzinoğlu was named as the head of the Coordination Council in August 1974. The council was designed to reorganization of the region under Turkish administration. Müezzinoğlu was in office until July 1975. He was elected to the Turkish Senate for the Republican People's Party in 1975 from his hometown, Kayseri.

Müezzinoğlu was elected as a senator from Kayseri in 1977. On 21 June 1977 he was appointed minister of commerce to the second cabinet of Bülent Ecevit. The cabinet could not get a vote of confidence at the Parliament on 3 July, and Müezzinoğlu's term ended on 27 July.

Müezzinoğlu was again appointed minister of finance on 5 January 1978 and served in the cabinet headed by Ecevit until 1979.

== Later years, personal life and death ==
Following his retirement from politics in 1990 Müezzinoğlu was involved in the establishment of several foundations, including Türkiye Ekonomik ve Sosyal Etütler Vakfı (Turkish: Turkish Economic and Social Studies Foundation), Çağdaş Demokrasi Vakfı (Turkish: Contemporary Democracy Foundation) and Türkiye–Avrupa Vakfı (Turkish: Foundation of Turkey–Europa)

He was married and had two children.

Müezzinoğlu died in Antalya on 13 June 2020. He was buried at the Kötekli Belen cemetery in Antalya on 15 June after the funeral prayers.
