= Hasan Esat Işık =

Turkish diplomat and politician

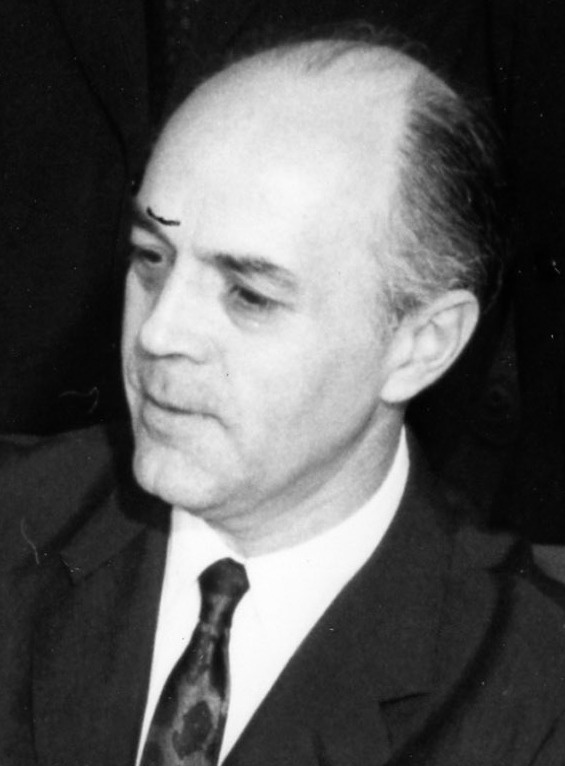
Hasan Esat Işık

Hasan Esat Işık (21 October 1916 – 2 July 1989) was a Turkish diplomat and politician.

== Biography ==
Hasan Esat Işık was born in Istanbul. His father was Mehmet Esat, a well known physician. After graduating from Galatasaray High School and Ankara University Faculty of Law, he held various positions in Ministry of Foreign Affairs. He served as the Permanent Representative of the European Office in Geneva in 1952, and as Ambassador to Brussels, Moscow and Paris from 1962 to 1973. Following the military coup of 27 May 1960 which ended the rule of Democrat Party (DP) Işık, Oğuz Gökmen and Semih Günver who were close to Fatin Rüştü Zorlu, minister of foreign affairs in the DP cabinet, were dismissed from the Ministry. When they were cleared of all charges as a result of the investigations, they were appointed to new positions, and Işık was named as the ambassador of Turkey to Belgium.

In 1965, Işık was appointed the minister of foreign affairs in the 29th cabinet of Turkey (AP-CKMP-YTP-MP) of Prime Minister Suat Hayri Ürgüplü. He was not a member of the Turkish Grand National Assembly when he was appointed to this post. After leaving the Ministry of Foreign Affairs, he was elected as a member of Parliament for Bursa from CHP in the 1973 and 1977 elections. He was appointed Minister of National Defense in the 37th, 40th and 42nd cabinet of Turkey. He left the ministry on 16 January 1979.

Hasan Esat Işık was also the deputy secretary general of the CHP. He was among those who were banned from politics for 5 years by the new constitution following the 1980 coup d'etat.

Işık died in Ankara on 2 July 1989 at the age of 72.

Political offices
Preceded by Feridun Cemal Erkin	Minister of Foreign Affairs; 1965–1965	Succeeded by İhsan Sabri Çağlayangil
Preceded by İlhami Sancar	Minister of National Defense of Turkey; 1974–1974	Succeeded by İlhami Sancar
Preceded by Ferit Melen	Minister of National Defense of Turkey; 1977–1977	Succeeded by Sadettin Bilgiç
Preceded by Turhan Kapanlı	Minister of National Defense of Turkey; 1978–1979	Neşet Akmandor
