= Fuat Doğu =

Turkish military officer (1914–2004)

- Born: Mehmet Fuat; 1914; Istanbul, Ottoman Empire
- Died: 31 May 2004 (aged 89–90); Istanbul, Turkey
- Education: Turkish Military Academy
- Children: 2
- Military career
- Allegiance: Turkey
- Branch: Turkish Land Forces
- Rank: Lieutenant general
- Other work: Undersecretary of the Turkish National Intelligence Agency

Fuat Doğu (1914–2004) was a Turkish military officer who served as the undersecretary of the Turkish National Intelligence Agency and as the ambassador of Turkey to Portugal.

== Early life and education ==
He was born in Istanbul in 1914. He graduated from the Turkish Military Academy.

== Career and activities ==
After working at different positions in the Turkish Land Forces Staff Lieutenant Colonel Doğu joined the National Intelligence Agency on 14 September 1954. He was one of the pupils of German military and intelligence officer Reinhard Gehlen. Doğu became a staff colonel and was named as the undersecretary of the National Intelligence Agency on 27 August 1962. His term ended on 25 August 1964, and he was appointed as the commander of the 59th Division in Sivas. Then he was made a member of the General Staff Inspection Board. He retired from the army with the title of lieutenant general.

Doğu was reappointed as the undersecretary of the intelligence agency on 1 March 1966. The agency began to collect information for the National Security Council which had been established with the new constitution put into force in 1961. Prime Minister Nihat Erim and Deputy Prime Minister Sadi Koçaş found that Doğu was heading a secret unit within the National Intelligence Agency. They fired him from office on 23 July 1971. In 1973 Doğu was appointed ambassador of Turkey to Portugal and served in the post until 1978.

== Death ==
Doğu died on 31 May 2004.
