= Switzerland–Turkey relations =

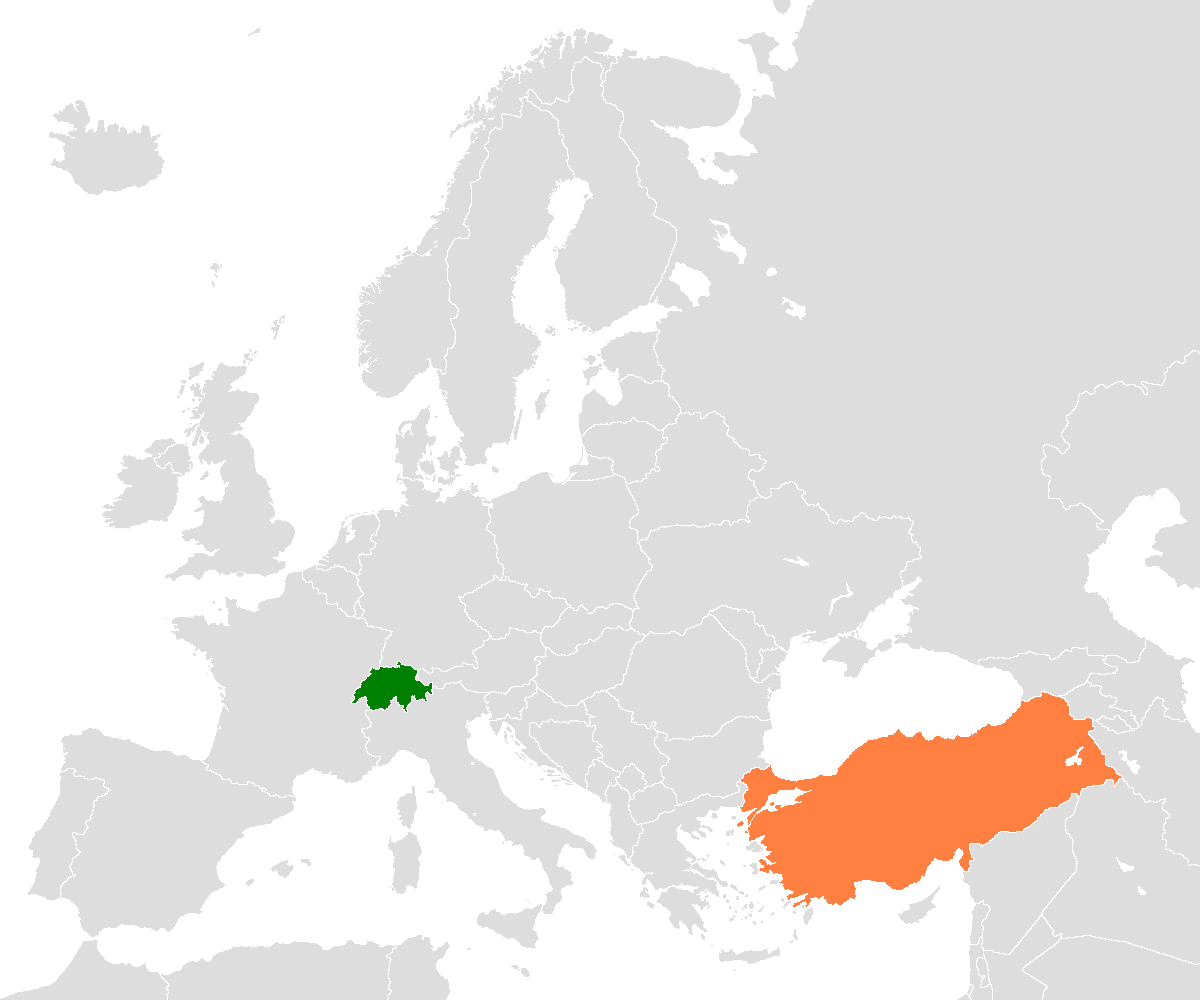
- Switzerland: Turkey

Diplomatic mission
- Embassy of Switzerland, Ankara: Embassy of Turkey, Bern

Switzerland–Turkey relations are foreign relations between Switzerland and Turkey. Switzerland has an embassy in Ankara and a consulate-general in Istanbul. Turkey has an embassy in Bern and consulates-general in Zürich and Geneva. Both countries are full members of the Council of Europe, the OECD, the OSCE and the WTO.

== Demographics ==
Approximately 130,000 immigrants from Turkey live in Switzerland, many of them Turkish Kurds.

== Bilateral relations ==
Turkey and Switzerland enjoy diverse relations and are engaged in regular high-level political dialogue. Both cultural and economic ties are significant. Switzerland is a major investor in Turkish businesses in the amount of US$94.3 billion (2005–2022), creating 14,500 jobs in Turkey. In 1988 both nations signed the bilateral Investment Promotion and Protection Agreement and the Agreement for the Avoidance of Double Taxation, which took effect on 1 January 2013. The 1991 Free Trade Agreement through EFTA was amended and came into force on 1 October 2021. In 2008, the dialogue between both nations intensified after presidential visits and the two countries since 2009 hold annual political consultations particularly on security, business and migration.

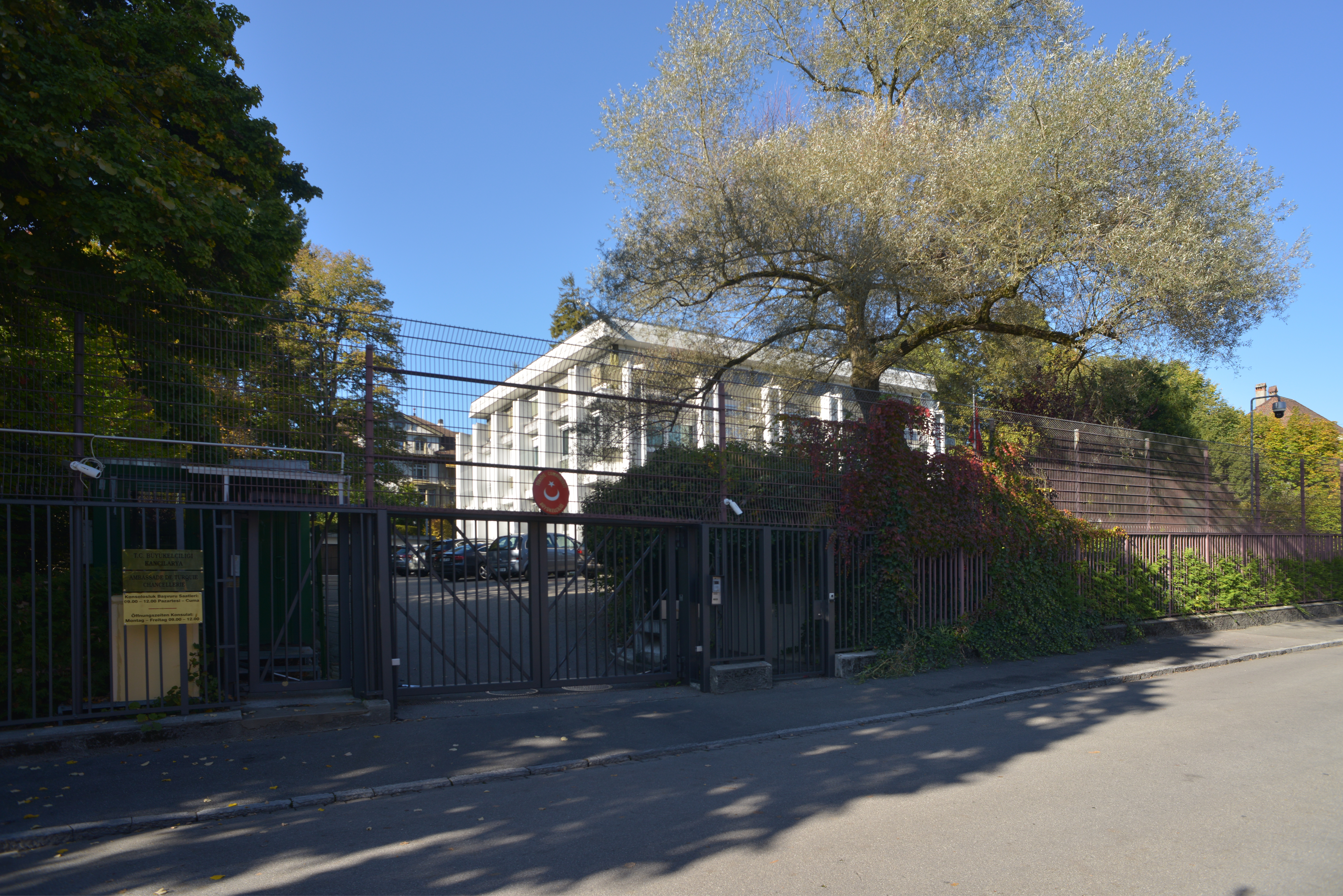
Embassy of Turkey in Bern

Since 2017 after the economic downturn in Turkey, the trade volume increased steadily and stood at almost US$17 billion (1.3 billion exports and 15.3 billion imports) in 2022. Turkey is also a major tourist destination for Swiss residents. Main export commodities are chemicals and pharmaceuticals, watches, textil industry components and medical devices. Imports from Turkey are typically gold, agricultural products and automobiles as well as petroleum and related products. With about 1,000 Swiss businesses operating in Turkey, and the projected expansion of the Turkish economy on a global scale, Turkey is seen as a strategically important nation for Switzerland. In 2023, a Swiss business delegation represented by SECO was invited to Ankara to discuss the modernisation of the EFTA free trade agreement to secure sustainable growth in economic relations.

== Diplomatic incidents ==
In March 2017, the Swiss Office of the Attorney General launched an investigation into possible surveillance of the Turkish community in Switzerland. Those suspected of conducting the espionage reportedly worked at the Turkish embassy in Bern. The suspects reportedly monitored participants of a political protest at the University of Zurich and attempted to kidnap in 2016 a Swiss-Turkish businessman linked to the Gülen movement in Zürich. Turkish Ambassador Ilhan Saygili denied the allegations.

In June 2023, Turkey summoned Switzerland's ambassador Jean Daniel Ruch over a demonstration in Zurich against President Tayyip Erdogan, including burning of an effigy and banners being displayed. Deputy Foreign Minister Mehmet Kemal Bozbay told Ruch that the acts were unacceptable and requested an investigation to determine those involved.

== Video game market ==
as of January 1, 2025, both Switzerland and Turkey doesn't officially supports PEGI rating system, and Switzerland commonly uses ESRB rating system on digital stores, also, Switzerland is only one European country uses ESRB rating system for video games, rather than PEGI.

== Resident diplomatic missions ==
Of the Swiss Confederation

- Ankara (Embassy)
- Istanbul (Consulate-General)

Of the Republic of Türkiye

- Bern (Embassy)
- Geneva (Consulate-General)
- Zurich (Consulate-General)

== See also ==
- Foreign relations of Switzerland
- Foreign relations of Turkey
- List of ambassadors of Switzerland to Turkey
- List of ambassadors of Turkey to Switzerland
- Turks in Switzerland
