= 35th government of Turkey =

Government of the Republic of Turkey (1972–1973)

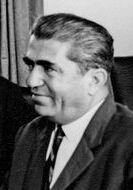
Deputy Prime Minister of Turkey, Ekrem Alican

The 35th government of Turkey (22 May 1972 – 15 April 1973) was a government in the history of Turkey. It is also called the Melen government.

== Background ==
After Nihat Erim, the prime minister of the previous government, resigned, President Cevdet Sunay appointed Ferit Melen, the minister of National Defence in the previous government, as the prime minister. Ferit Melen was a member of National Reliance Party (MGP), a small party in the parliament, but his government had the support of the two major parties, Republican People's Party (CHP) and Justice Party (AP). The Melen government lineup was similar to the previous government's.

== The government ==
Title	Name	Party
Prime Minister	Ferit Melen	MGP
Minister of State
Minister of State	İsmail Arar	CHP
Minister of State	Doğan Kitaplı	AP
Minister of State	İlhan Öztrak	Indep
Minister of State	Zeyyat Baykara	Indep
Ministry of Justice	Fehmi Alparslan	MGP
Ministry of National Defense	Mehmet İzmen	Indep
Ministry of the Interior	Ferit Kubat	Indep
Ministry of Foreign Affairs	Ümit Haluk Bayülken	Indep
Ministry of Finance and Customs	Ziya Müezzinoğlu	Indep
Ministry of National Education	Sabahattin Özbek	Indep
Ministry of Public Works	Mukadder Öztekin	CHP
Ministry of Construction and Settlement	Turgut Toker	AP
Ministry of Health and Social Security	Kemal Demir	CHP
Ministry of Agriculture	Necmi Sönmez	AP
Ministry of Village Affairs	Necmi Sönmez	Indep
Ministry of Forestry	Selahattin İnal	Indep
Ministry of Transport	Rıfkı Danışman	AP
Ministry of Labour	Ali Rıza Uzuner	CHP
Ministry of Commerce	Naim Talu	Indep
Ministry of Industry and Technology	Ali Mesut Erez	AP
Ministry of Customs and Monopolies	Haydar Özalp	AP
Ministry Tourism	Erol Yılmaz Akçal	AP
Ministry of Energy and Natural Resources	Nuri Kodamanoğlu	CHP
Ministry of Youth and Sports	Adnan Karaküçük	AP

== Aftermath ==
On 6 April 1973, Fahri Korutürk was elected as the new president of Turkey. As political tradition dictated, Ferit Melen resigned on the next day. The next government was founded by Naim Talu, the Minister of Commerce in the Melen government.

Preceded by 34th government of Turkey (Nihat Erim)	35th Government of Turkey; 22 May 1972 - 15 April 1973	Succeeded by 36th government of Turkey (Naim Talu)
