= Hüsnü A. Göksel =

Turkish physician (1919–2002)

- Born: 16 April 1919; Bandırma, Ottoman Empire
- Died: 30 August 2002 (aged 83); Ankara, Turkey
- Education: Istanbul University; Gülhane Military Medical Academy
- Years active: 1950s–2002
- Spouse: Selma Ertegün
- Children: 2
- Medical career
- Profession: Physician
- Institutions: Ankara University; Hacettepe University; Başkent University
- Sub-specialties: Breast cancer
- Research: Surgical oncology

Hüsnü A. Göksel (1919–2002) was a Turkish physician and a leftist political figure. He is known for his newspaper articles, books and his contributions to the establishment of the Atatürkist Thought Association.

== Early years and education ==
Göksel was born in Bandırma on 16 April 1919. His father, Aziz Ethem Göksel (1871–1946), was a military physician. He had a brother, Fuat Aziz, who was also a physician and a sister, Müzeyyen Berker, who was a jurist and sociologist.

After graduating from a high school in Ankara in 1937 Hüsnü Göksel received a degree in medicine from Istanbul University in 1943. He obtained his surgical training at Gülhane Military Medical Academy and graduated from the program as a general surgeon in 1944. Between 1956 and 1960 he was trained in cancer surgery and surgery pathology at the Columbia University's Cancer Research Institute, USA.

== Career ==
Following his graduation Göksel worked at the hospital of Ankara University. He became an associate professor in 1956 and a full professor in 1965 at Hacettepe University. He was a breast cancer specialist. After his retirement in 1986 he joined Başkent University as a faculty member.

In addition to his medical career, Göksel was a writer and contributor to several publications from 1955. During his studies in the USA he worked as a correspondent of Ulus newspaper. He was a regular contributor of Ulus (1961–1963) and Cumhuriyet newspapers (1969–2002). He was among the founder of the Turkish Writers' Union. He also established the Atatürkist Thought Association along with Muammer Aksoy and Hıfzı Veldet Velidedeoğlu.

=== Books ===
Göksel published various books in different genres. His poetry books included Memnu Meyva (1955) and Bunca Yağmurların Söndüremediği (1992). The collection of his essays was published under the titles of Deneme: Barışa Özlem (1986) and Bu Dağların Arkasında Başka Dağlar Var (1993). His story books are as follows: Ben Bu Menekşeleri Senin İçin Topladım (1991) and Lacivert Mayolu Kız (1996). He also published a novel entitled Ayışığı Sonatı (Moonlight Sonata; 1994).

=== Trials ===
In the aftermath of the 1980 military coup led by Kenan Evren, Turkish intelligentsia faced heavy oppression. They issued the Petition of Intellectuals (Turkish: Aydınlar Dilekçesi) which was submitted to the Presidency and the Parliament. Göksel was among the signatories of this document, and he was arrested and tried due to his involvement in the incident with others. Göksel was also tried due to his article entitled Ölüm Cezası Üzerine (Turkish: On death penalty) published in Cumhuriyet in 1986.

== Personal life and death ==
Göksel married Selma Ertegün (died 20 October 2020), daughter of Münir Ertegün and sister of Ahmet and Nesuhi Ertegün. They had two children, a daughter, Aslı, and a son, Aziz (died April 2019).

Göksel died of multiple myeloma in Ankara on 30 August 2002. A funeral prayer for him was performed at Silivri Piri Paşa Mosque, Istanbul, and he was buried in the Silivri cemetery.
