= Mehmet Esat Işık =

Turkish physician and politician (1865–1936)

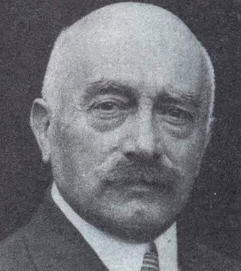

Personal details
- Born: 3 April 1865 Constantinople, Ottoman Empire
- Died: 1 November 1936 (aged 71) Istanbul, Turkey
- Children: Hasan Esat Işık

Mehmet Esat Işık (3 April 1865 – 1 November 1936) was a Turkish physician and politician, known for his contribution in the development of ophthalmology in his home country.

== Biography ==
Mehmet Esat was born in Istanbul on 3 April 1865. His mother was the daughter of Ağa Yusuf Pasha who served as the grand vizier. He was educated at the military medical academy and received his specialty training in medicine in France graduating from the University of Paris. After attending medical schools in Germany and Austria he returned to the Ottoman Empire in 1894 and established the first ophthalmic clinic in the country.

Mehmet Esat supported the national independence movement led by Mustafa Kemal. He was exiled by the British to Malta on 16 March 1920 and was freed in October 1921. Then he settled in Ankara where he established an ophthalmic clinic. He worked at the Istanbul University's Faculty of Medicine between 1931 and 1933. He died of heart failure in Istanbul on 1 November 1936.

His son was Hasan Esat Işık who served as the foreign minister of Turkey.
