= List of ambassadors of Turkey to the United Kingdom =

Ambassador of Turkey to the Court of St. James's
- Star and crescent of Turkey
- Incumbent; Osman Koray Ertaş since 14 March 2023
- Ministry of Foreign Affairs (Turkey); Embassy of Turkey, London
- Style: His or Her Excellency (formal); Mr. or Madam Ambassador (informal)
- Reports to: Minister of Foreign Affairs (Turkey)
- Seat: London, United Kingdom
- Appointer: President of Turkey
- Term length: At the pleasure of the president
- Inaugural holder: Yusuf Kemal Tengirşenk
- Formation: 1924

The list of ambassadors of Turkey to the United Kingdom provides a chronological record of individuals who have served as the diplomatic representatives of the Republic of Turkey to the United Kingdom of Great Britain and Northern Ireland.

== List of ambassadors ==
Ambassador	Term start	Term end	Ref.
Yusuf Kemal Tengirşenk	11 January 1924	1 September 1924	
Zekai Apaydın	10 September 1924	1 June 1925	
Ahmet Ferit Tek	1 June 1925	1 June 1932	
Münir Ertegün	22 July 1932	1 March 1934	
Ali Fethi Okyar	1 March 1934	1 January 1939	
Tevfik Rüştü Aras	1 January 1939	1 March 1942	
Rauf Orbay	23 March 1942	1 April 1944	
Ruşen Eşref Ünaydın	17 April 1944	8 November 1945	
Cevat Açıkalın	8 November 1945	1 March 1952	
Hüseyin Ragıp Baydur	3 March 1952	26 February 1955	
Suat Hayri Ürgüplü	15 September 1955	1 May 1957	
Muharrem Nuri Birgi	1 June 1957	4 August 1960	
Feridun Cemal Erkin	29 August 1960	28 March 1962	
Kemal Kavur	1 October 1962	4 November 1963	
Zeki Kuneralp	7 January 1964	4 July 1966	
Ümit Haluk Bayülken	14 July 1966	26 July 1969	
Zeki Kuneralp	20 August 1969	27 October 1972	
Turgut Menemencioğlu	30 November 1972	16 August 1978	
Vahap Aşiroğlu	2 October 1978	13 July 1981	
Rahmi Gümrükçüoğlu	20 July 1981	27 December 1988	
Nurver Nureş	15 January 1989	27 September 1991	
Candemir Önhon	30 September 1991	17 May 1995	
Özdem Sanberk	1 May 1995	1 March 2000	
Korkmaz Haktanır	1 April 2000	1 December 2002	
Akın Alptuna	1 February 2003	1 May 2007	
Mehmet Yiğit Alpogan	21 July 2007	26 June 2010	
Ahmet Ünal Çeviköz	15 July 2010	28 June 2014	
Abdurrahman Bilgiç	8 July 2014	26 September 2018	
Ümit Yalçın	27 September 2018	6 March 2023	
Osman Koray Ertaş	14 March 2023	Present	

== See also ==
- Embassy of Turkey in London
- Turkey–United Kingdom relations
