= Türk (magazine) =

Political magazine in Egypt (1903–1907)

- Categories: Political magazine
- Frequency: Weekly
- Founder: Ali Kemal
- Founded: 1903; 123 years ago
- First issue: 5 November 1903
- Final issue: 28 November 1907
- Country: Egypt
- Based in: Cairo
- Language: Turkish

Türk was one of the publications published by Ali Kemal, a member of the Committee of Union and Progress (CUP). It was based in Cairo and existed between 1903 and 1907.

== History and profile ==
Türk was established by Ali Kemal, a CUP member living in Cairo. Its first issue appeared on 5 November that year. Ali Kemal also edited the magazine which was headquartered in Cairo and came out weekly. It had a nationalist political stance and opposed the rule of Ottoman Sultan Abdul Hamid II. Its goals were to secure the rights of the Turks, to revive Turkish ideals and to advocate Turkish nationalism as an ideology.

Notable contributors of Türk included Serafeddin Mağmumi, Necmeddin Arif, Esad Bey, and Celaleddin Bey. Yusuf Akçura's article entitled Üç Tarz-ı Siyaset (Ottoman Turkish: Three political systems) was serialized in the magazine from 24th to 26th issues between April and May 1904. He argued that the Ottomanism, Islamism and Turkism are three necessary components in establishing an Ottoman nation, an Islamic unity and a race-based Turkish nationalism. Ali Kemal criticized the Akçura's proposal in an editorial entitled Cevabımız (Ottoman Turkish: Our reply), claiming that he was just a dreamer. Ahmet Ferit also published an article in the weekly in regard to the views of Akçura criticizing Ali Kemal's arguments and supporting Akçura's emphasis on Ottomanism. The last issue of Türk was published on 28 November 1907, and the weekly produced a total of 187 issues during its existence.
