= Sadi Koçaş =

Turkish military officer and politician (1919–1998)

- Born: Mehmet Sadi; 1919; Karaman, Ottoman Empire
- Died: 12 January 1998 (aged 78–79); Istanbul, Turkey
- Burial place: Zincirlikuyu cemetery, Istanbul
- Alma mater: Turkish Military Academy
- Children: 2
- Military career
- Allegiance: Turkey
- Branch: Turkish Land Forces
- Rank: Colonel
- Other work: Deputy Prime Minister (1971)

Sadi Koçaş (1919–1998) was a Turkish military officer and politician. He was among the military figures who planned a military coup against the rule of the Democrat Party on 27 May 1960. Retired from the army in 1961 he became a member of the Republican People's Party. He briefly served as the deputy prime minister in the cabinet led by Nihat Erim immediately after another military coup in 1971.

== Early life and education ==
He was born in Karaman, Ottoman Empire, in 1919. His family later settled in Istanbul. He graduated from the Turkish Military Academy as an artillery officer in 1940. He continued his education and became a staff officer in 1950. Then he was educated at the School of Land/Air Warfare in the United Kingdom between 1952 and 1953.

== Career and activities ==
Following his graduation Koçaş worked in the Turkish Army and in the Ministry of Defense. He was a military attaché in Bucharest, Socialist Republic of Romania, between 1954 and 1956. He was first involved in the secret activities in November 1954 to carry out a military coup against the government led by Prime Minister Adnan Menderes. During this period Koçaş was a major. In 1957 he formed another secret group of the military officers in Ankara against the government. In February 1959 he managed to get support from Cemal Gürsel, commander of land forces, to implement the planned coup. Shortly after these activities Koçaş was sent to London as a military attaché which he held until 1961. He retired from the army with the rank of colonel in 1961.

Cemal Gürsel, leader of the 1960 military coup and President of Turkey, appointed Koçaş as a senator in 1962. He served at the Senate until his resignation in 1969. Then he joined the Republican People's Party and was elected as a deputy from Konya. On 26 March 1971 he was appointed deputy prime minister to the cabinet led by Prime Minister Nihat Erim which had been formed shortly after the Turkish military memorandum on 12 March. Koçaş's ministerial portfolio included political and administrative affairs. Koçaş and eleven other cabinet members resigned from their posts on 3 December 1971. Following this incident he retired from politics.

== Personal life and death ==
Koçaş was married and had two daughters. He died in Istanbul on 12 January 1998 and was buried in the Zincirlikuyu cemetery next day.

=== Work ===
Koçaş is the author of several non-fiction books. Two of his books were his memoirs which were published in 1977 and 1978. In these books Koçaş reports the existence of an extremely secret service within the state apparatus which was allegedly led by Fuat Doğu, the undersecretary of Turkish National Intelligence Agency. This claim was also shared by Prime Minister Nihat Erim, and they managed to remove Fuat Doğu from office.

Koçaş also published a book on the history of Armenians and the relations between Armenians and Turks in 1990.
