= Bromham, Wiltshire =

Village in Wiltshire, England

Coordinates: 51.386°N 2.054°W

Bromham
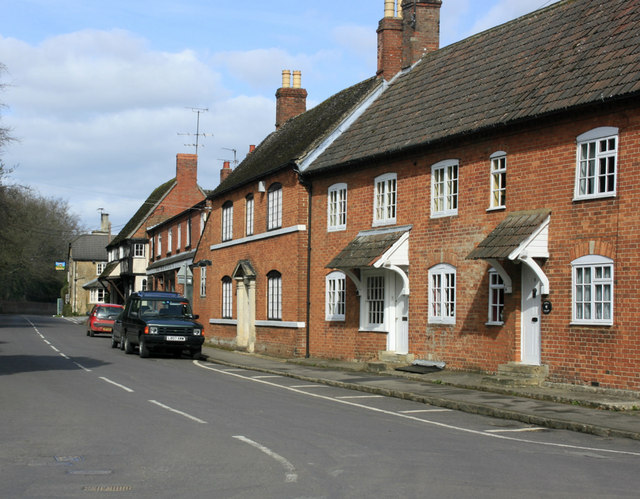
- High Street, Bromham

- Location within Wiltshire
- Population: 1,846 (in 2011)
- OS grid reference: ST963652
- Civil parish: Bromham
- Unitary authority: Wiltshire
- Ceremonial county: Wiltshire
- Region: South West
- Country: England
- Sovereign state: United Kingdom
- Post town: Chippenham
- Postcode district: SN15
- Dialling code: 01380
- Police: Wiltshire
- Fire: Dorset and Wiltshire
- Ambulance: South Western
- UK Parliament: Melksham and Devizes
- Website: Parish Council

Bromham is a village and civil parish in Wiltshire, England. The village is 3 1/2 miles (6 km) northwest of Devizes and the same distance east of Melksham.

Besides the main village of Bromham, the parish includes six other settlements: St Edith's Marsh, Westbrook, Hawkstreet, Netherstreet, Roughmoor and Chittoe. These are sub-villages and hamlets all within 2 miles (3.2 km) of the main village centre, thus 'greater Bromham' is geographically extensive for a village of its size. It stands 1½ miles north of the Kennet and Avon Canal and 1¾ of a mile south of the Roman road leading to Bath, Somerset. In 2011 the parish had a population of 1846.

== History ==
The name Bromham derives from the Old English brōmhām or brōmhamm, meaning 'broom settlement' or 'broom hemmed-in land'.

In Anglo-Saxon times the manor was held, in the reign of Edward the Confessor, by Earl Harold Godwinson. Under the Normans there were two manors covering Bromham. Bromham Hall, later called Bromham House, the manor house of Bromham Roches, stood to the east of the Devizes road; it was burnt by royalist troops in May 1645, during the civil war.

=== Chittoe ===
The small village of Chittoe is about 1 mile (1.6 km) north of Bromham. Its name, first attested in 1167 as Chetewe, is unusual in England for deriving from Common Brittonic: the first element is agreed to be the word that survives in modern Welsh as coed ("woodland"). The origin of the second part of the name is less certain; twenty-first-century scholarship suggests the ancestor of the Welsh word tew ("thick"). The area was a detached tithing of the ancient parish of Bishops Cannings until 1883 when Chittoe became a separate civil parish, taking some land from Bromham; in 1934 the parish was merged into Bromham.

== Places of worship ==
=== Parish church ===
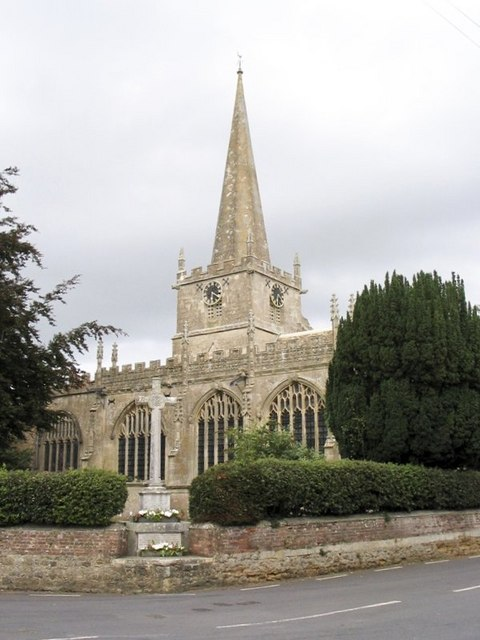
Bromham parish church

The Church of England parish church of St. Nicholas, in the centre of the village, is from the 13th century and is a Grade I listed building. The church has fragments of its 12th century predecessor, and was extended in the 14th and 15th centuries. The tall spire is from the 15th century. Towards the end of that century an ornate south chapel was added by Sir Roger Tocotes and Sir Richard Beauchamp; Pevsner describes it as "the feature which makes a visit to the church memorable". In the 16th and 17th centuries several members of the Bayntun family were buried or commemorated in the chapel, thus it became known as the Bayntun chapel.

The churchyard has the grave of Irish poet Thomas Moore, who had long resided at Sloperton Cottage, north of Bromham.

Today the parish is part of the Bromham, Chittoe and Sandy Lane benefice, which also covers St Matthew's Church at Rowde and the small wooden church of St Mary and St Nicholas at Sandy Lane.

=== Nonconformity ===
Bromham Methodist Church was built in 1799, on Church Hill below the parish church and enlarged in 1815 and 1880. As of 2016 the church is still in use.

A Baptist chapel was built at Bromham in 1873, replacing an earlier building of 1828. The chapel closed during the Second World War and is now a private house.

=== Chittoe ===
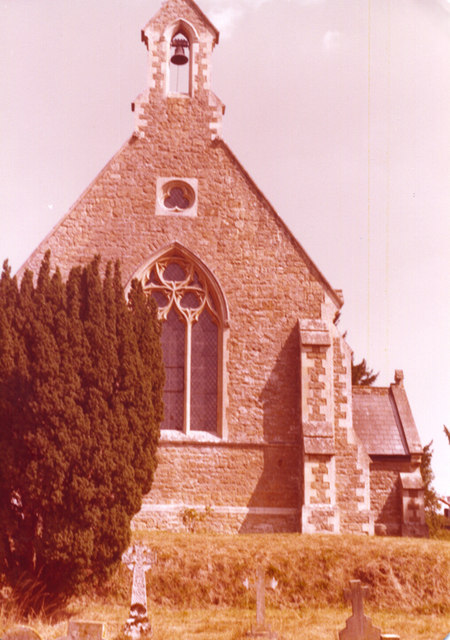
Chittoe parish church in 1976

Primitive Methodists built a chapel in the centre of Chittoe in 1840. Enthusiastic singing by the Methodists could be heard from within the Anglican church after it was built nearby, so in 1882 the chapel was dismantled and rebuilt at Chittoe Heath, not far from the Devizes road (now the A342). A schoolroom was added at the rear of the chapel in 1914. As of 2016 the chapel is still in use and is served by the minister of Melksham United Church.

The Church of St Mary, Chittoe, was built in 1845 to designs of T. H. Wyatt. A district (which included Westbrook) was created for it the next year. Previously, the hamlet had been a detached part of the parish of Bishops Cannings and villagers had to travel to the church there for marriages and burials, using a trackway called the "Burying Road". For burials this requirement was relaxed at the end of the 18th century, but weddings were still conducted at Cannings until the new church was brought into use. Chittoe parish was enlarged in 1864 to include Sandy Lane, taking areas from Derry Hill and Bromham parishes.

In 1980 the church was declared redundant, and its parish and benefice were united with Bromham; subsequently the church and vicarage at Chittoe were converted to private residences.

== Notable buildings ==
The parish has three Grade II* listed houses. Battle House, named for the manor of Bromham Battle, held by Battle Abbey, is partly 15th century, largely rebuilt c. 1760; it was the home of the historian Sir William Napier between 1826 and 1831.

Spye Arch, at the top of Bowden Hill, once served as gatehouse to Spye Park, a seat of the Bayntun family. It had originally been constructed in the 16th century as the gatehouse of the Cistercian Stanley Abbey, which stood near the eastern edge of the parish, towards Chippenham; the Abbot's Wood that appears as a block of woodland in Andrews' and Dury's Map of Wiltshire, 1773, survives as a narrow wooded strip south of the village.

Nonsuch House, north of Bromham village on the road from Melksham, is from the early 18th century.

== Notable people ==
The noted antiquary, author and Somerset historian the Rev. John Collinson was born in Bromham on 19 July 1757. His father, John Collinson, was at the time curate of the parish church of St. Nicholas.

Reginald St John Battersby was vicar of Chittoe from 1934 until his retirement in 1972. He had lost a leg while serving as a young officer in the First World War; in the Second World War he organised the Chittoe branch of the Home Guard.

== Local government ==
Bromham is a civil parish with an elected parish council and is in the area of Wiltshire Council, a unitary authority. The councils are responsible for different aspects of local government.

== Education ==
St. Nicholas Church of England Primary School is in the village. For secondary education, Bromham is in the catchment area of Kingsbury Green Academy in Calne.

For many years there were two schools in the village. The first school opened in 1832 and moved into a new building (still the site of the present school) near the church in 1867, becoming a National School. Children of all ages attended until 1938, when older pupils transferred to Calne; the school became Voluntary controlled in 1948. The building was extended in the 1960s and again in 2004.

A Nonconformist school was established in 1843, and in the 1860s became a British School in a new building to the east of the village, near the Devizes road. The building was enlarged in 1901, then was transferred to Wiltshire County Council in 1907 and was known as Bromham County School. Pupil numbers declined until two schools were no longer necessary, resulting in closure of the county school in 1984. Its building is now a private house.

== Amenities ==
Bromham has a village shop and a family butcher's shop.

The village has two playing fields. The Pound Playing Field has the village's tennis court, a grassed football pitch, a play park and a hardcourt basketball and five-a-side football area. The Social Centre Playing Fields include Bromham F.C.'s football pitch and a smaller pitch that is used by the youth team. Just by the car park of the Social Centre is another children's play park which is overlooked by the Millennium Cross: a tall stone cross erected in 2000 and recording the village's Christian heritage.

Bromham Football Club was founded in 1897 by Harry Amor and Arthur Powney.

There is a bowls club that meet every week at the Social Centre to play indoor bowls on special mats that turn the dance floor into a bowls green.

At the Pound Playing Field there is a tennis court available to hire.

Bromham was served by the Great Western Railway at Bromham and Rowde railway station from 1909 until the station closed in 1955.

== Carnival ==
Bromham Carnival is held each June for two weeks. It comprises village-wide events, opening with the choosing of the Carnival Queen, Butterfly Princess, Princess and Prince. The events then continue including quizzes, bingo, treasure hunts and much more. On the final Saturday of the two weeks the carnival procession is held, commencing usually at 2.00pm from the Pound Playing Field and winding its way through the village to the Social Centre Playing Field where activities and shows take place throughout the afternoon. For the past few years, the carnival has been followed by the locally organised show: "Bromfest". Bands from the local area play from 5.00pm through until 12 midnight and mark the end of the carnival period.

== Twinnings ==
Bromham is twinned with:

- (Republic of Ireland) – Avoca, Ireland (filming location for the 1990s BBC series Ballykissangel)
- – Ingrandes-sur-Loire, France

== Sources ==
- "Bromham". Wiltshire Community History. Wiltshire Council.
- Crowley, D.A. (ed.). "Victoria County History – Wiltshire – Vol 7 pp179-186 – Parishes: Bromham". British History Online. University of London.
