= Nonsuch Estate =

English country estate

Nonsuch Estate is a country house and estate at Westbrook in the parish of Bromham, Wiltshire, England. A house was first built on the site in 1646 for Lord Digby. The present building dates from the early eighteenth century and was rebuilt after 1705 by William Norris. It remained with the Norris family until 1835 and later passed to the Meredith-Brown family in the nineteenth century. In the 1920s the Bankier family made substantial alterations to the main house. On 17 February 2022 a major fire affected the main house, leaving the house with substantial fire and water damage. Later in 2022, the estate was marketed for sale and a purchase was agreed in September. The sale was completed to Mr Niall Leighton-Boyce in February 2023 and the new owner has published proposals to restore the property into a boutique hotel and spa, with an indicative opening in June 2027 subject to consents. Nonsuch House is listed at Grade II* and several associated estate structures are listed at Grade II. Historic England records the site on its national Heritage at Risk register.

== History ==
An early house was said to have been built on the site in 1646 for Lord Digby. Around 1700 the estate passed to William Norris who rebuilt the house after 1705. An estate map of 1705 shows a house with a steep hipped roof and details typical of the later seventeenth century. The house remained in the Norris family until 1835 and then in the Meredith-Brown family from 1849 into the early twentieth century. In the interwar period the Bankier family commissioned alterations. The list entry describes an ashlar house of two storeys and attic with a seven-bay principal front and stone-slate hipped roof. Interiors were substantially remodelled in the 1920s in revived eighteenth-century styles.

The house was added to the National Heritage List for England on 19 March 1962 at Grade II*. Estate structures within its curtilage placed on the same date include the forecourt walls and gate piers, garden walls with summerhouse, and an outbuilding listed formerly as a dovecote.

== Fire ==
At 18:59 on 17 February 2022 Dorset and Wiltshire Fire and Rescue Service began receiving multiple 999 calls to a large property fire at Westbrook near Bromham. Local reporting stated that about 75 firefighters attended and that 19 appliances including an aerial ladder platform were deployed. The A3102 was closed during the incident and crews from several counties worked through the night. Images and on-scene reports the following morning described extensive damage to the main house. Historic England later described the event as a catastrophic fire and added the site to the Heritage at Risk register.

== Restoration and future plans ==
In September 2022 a sale was agreed and the estate was purchased by Boyce Group, who specialise in restoring listed buildings. The new owner announced an intention to restore the main house and adapt the estate for use as a boutique hotel and spa, together with conversion of barns and cottages for guest accommodation. Plans published in 2023 indicated an estimated reopening in June 2027 subject to planning and heritage consents.

== Architecture and grounds ==
The principal house is constructed of ashlar stone with two stories and attics under a hipped stone-slate roof. The main elevation of seven bays presents a symmetrical classical composition with central doorway and sash windows. The 1920s alterations introduced new interiors in an eighteenth-century style including plasterwork and panelling.

The grounds include walled gardens, gate piers and forecourt walls, as well as an estate outbuilding listed as a dovecote but understood to have served other functions. Historic maps show a designed landscape with formal approaches and kitchen gardens. The wider estate at Westbrook incorporates farmland and woodland formerly associated with the house
