= Ali Kemal =

Turkish journalist, politician and writer (1867–1922)

Ali Kemal Bey
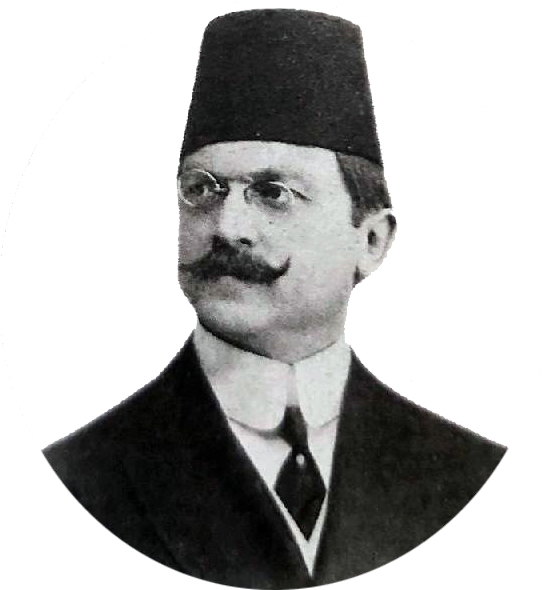

Minister of the Interior
- In office 4 March 1919 – 20 June 1919
- Monarch: Mehmed VI
- Prime Minister: Damat Ferid Pasha
- Preceded by: Mehmed Ali Bey
- Succeeded by: Adil Bey

Personal details
- Born: Ali Rıza; 7 September 1869 Istanbul, Ottoman Empire
- Died: 6 November 1922 (aged 53) İzmit, Turkey
- Resting place: İzmit, Turkey
- Party: Freedom and Accord Party; Liberty Party
- Spouses: Winifred Brun Hanım; Sabiha Hanım
- Children: 4, including Wilfred Johnson and Zeki Kuneralp
- Relatives: Stanley Johnson (grandson); Boris, Rachel, Jo & Julia Johnson (great grandchildren)
- Occupation: Journalist; Newspaper editor; Poet; Politician; Government official

Ali Kemal Bey (7 September 1869 – 6 November 1922) was a Turkish journalist, politician and writer who served as the Minister of the Interior of the Ottoman Empire in 1919 under the government of Grand Vizier Damat Ferid Pasha. Ideologically an Ottoman liberal, he was lynched by Nureddin Pasha's paramilitary officers for his opposition to the Turkish National Movement following Turkish victory in the Greco-Turkish War.

Kemal was the editor of the Peyam-ı Sabah newspaper, which was pro-Greek in sentiment. Additionally, he was also the foremost critic of the Turkish National Movement, referring to its members as murderers, bandits and Bolshevik agents, while also calling for their harsh suppression and comparing them to Celalis.

Kemal is the father of Zeki Kuneralp, who was the former Turkish ambassador in Switzerland, the United Kingdom, and Spain. In addition, he is the paternal grandfather of both the Turkish diplomat Selim Kuneralp, and the British politician Stanley Johnson. Through Johnson, Ali Kemal is the great-grandfather of former British prime minister Boris Johnson.

== Early life and career ==
Ali Kemal was born in 1867 in the Süleymaniye district of Istanbul. He was born Ali Rıza, but changed his second name due to his admiration of Namık Kemal. Kemal's father, Haci Ahmet Hamdi Rıza Effendi, born in 1815, was a Turk from the Central Anatolian village of Kalfat, Çankırı, who ran a candle making enterprise. His mother Hanife Fered was a Circassian, reputedly of slave origin.

He attended the Mekteb-i Mülkiye, the Civil Service School, in Istanbul. He left the institution in the last year of the four-year term and went to Paris in 1886 to improve his French. The following year he moved to Geneva and returned to Istanbul in 1888 to finish his education in the Mülkiye. This visit to Europe likely gave Kemal his liberal convictions which the autocratic government of Sultan Abdul Hamid II could not tolerate. Impressed by what he saw, he formed a student association which was forcefully dissolved by authorities. Kemal again attempted to establish another association, but was caught and imprisoned for nine months. After being released from prison, he was exiled to Aleppo in July 1889.

== Years of exile ==
During his exile in Aleppo, he taught the Turkish language and literature at a high school. He could not stand the stagnant life in the city and returned to Istanbul without permission in 1895. Thereupon, when another exile order was issued, he escaped to Paris, which had become a kind of headquarters of Abdul Hamid's opposition, the Young Turks. In Paris, he followed a mediating line between the Young Turks and Yıldız Palace. In 1897 Mizancı Murad Bey was elected Committee of Union and Progress leader over Ahmed Rıza Bey, but quickly resigned and defected from the Young Turks to return to the Hamidian fold. Ali Kemal defected with him, and he was appointed as deputy secretary of the Ottoman Embassy in Brussels. He did not return to Istanbul because he was afraid of how the CUP would react. After receiving his Political Sciences diploma in 1899, he lived in Egypt until the Young Turk Revolution. He managed a farm belonging to an Egyptian prince in Cairo, where he established and edited a weekly magazine, Türk, from 1903 and 1907.

While Ali Kemal was studying political sciences in Paris, he was also working as a journalist for the İkdam newspaper in Istanbul, publishing articles about his impressions of Paris and an admiration for western culture. Hüseyin Cahit Yalçın later exposed that much of Kemal's work in the newspaper were actually plagiarized translations from the French press, and this incident caused an enmity between the two that would last until the end of Ali Kemal's life.

In one of several visits to Switzerland, he fell in love with an Anglo-Swiss girl, Winifred Brun Hanım, born in Warwick in 1883, the daughter of Francis Julian "Frank" Brun and wife Margaret Hannah Johnson. They were married in Paddington, London, on 11 September 1903. He returned to Istanbul the day before the declaration of the Second Constitutional Monarchy.

== Second Constitutional Era ==
After the 1908 Young Turk Revolution Kemal returned to Istanbul, and became one of the most prominent figures in Ottoman journalism and politics. Because of his opposition to the Committee of Union and Progress (CUP), the group which had carried out the revolution, he spent most of the following decade opposed to the government. Upon his return, he appeared before the sultan and accepted Abdul Hamid's compliments and royal moneys; This was criticized by the Unionist press. He joined the Liberty Party, the CUP's main opposition. Kemal, now editor-in-chief of the liberal İkdam newspaper while also teaching political history at the Faculty of Literature at the Darülfünun, began to write editorials heavily criticizing the CUP. In the classroom, he passionately praised French liberalism to students, violently attacking those who disagreed with him.

In The Times dated 9 March 1909, on speculating that he would contest the seat of the late Minister of Justice Refik Bey, Kemal was described as amongst the "leading men of letters in Turkey, an excellent speaker, and personally very popular". Kemal was unanimously adopted as the Liberty Party's candidate for the 1909 Istanbul by-election at a party meeting on 9 March 1909, though he lost to the CUP's candidate, Mehmed Rifat Pasha.

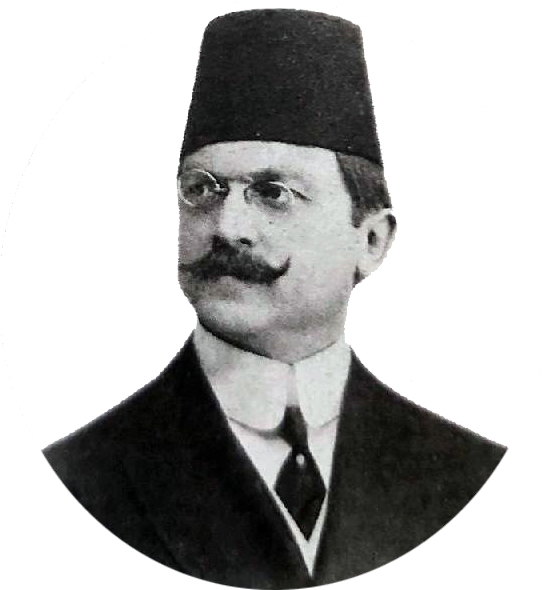
Ali Kemal in his middle age

After the murder of the editor-in-chief of the Serbestî newspaper, Hasan Fehmi, in April 1909, Ali Kemal stated that he had warned Ismail Kemal and Rifsat, the assistant editor of Serbestî, that they had been condemned by Unionist extremists in Salonica. A media storm between the liberal paper İkdam and the CUP organ Tanin followed, with İkdam accusing Ahmet Rıza of having been in favour of enlightened absolutism, and Tanin, the organ of the CUP, accusing the Liberty Party of being a subversive body, conspiring with Armenians. At that time Kemal accused Rahmi Bey and Doctor Nazım of the CUP of proposing his murder. After a speech he gave to a crowd at the Darülfünun on 7 April 1909, the day after the murder of Hasan Fehmi, students and faculty marched to the Sublime Porte to demand the arrest of the murderers; These events began the 31 March Incident, a political crisis that served to almost dismantle the Ottoman constitutional order and once again restore it as an autocracy under Abdul Hamid II. Ali Kemal had to flee to Paris again as Unionist forces dispatched from Salonica were about to enter Istanbul to restore order. In the meantime, his duty at the Mülkiye was terminated. With the constitutional order preserved, Abdul Hamid was deposed on 27 April 1909 and his half-brother Reshad Efendi was proclaimed as Sultan Mehmed V.

Kemal fled to exile in England, where in September 1909, his wife Winifred gave birth to a son, Osman Wilfred Ali Kemal, in Bournemouth. Shortly after giving birth his wife died of puerperal fever. They already had a son Lancelot Beodar who died in Switzerland aged 18 months after contracting whooping cough, and a daughter named Celma. Kemal stayed with his mother-in-law Margaret Brun (née Johnson) and with his children, first in Christchurch, near Bournemouth, and then in Wimbledon, London, until 1912, when he returned to the Ottoman Empire after that year's anti-Unionist coup d'état.

On his return from exile, Kemal gave a speech in favour of a war against the Balkan League in Istanbul on 3 October 1912. Montenegro started the First Balkan War by declaring war against the Ottomans five days later, and the Ottoman presence in the Balkans was reduced to a small part of Eastern Thrace. With the Unionists ascendant after the Raid of the Sublime Porte, Kemal was briefly arrested and again sent into exile, this time to Vienna, though he returned to the Empire three months later. He briefly published in a new newspaper that he founded as its editor-in-chief, Peyam, though it was shuttered under CUP pressure. He regained his teaching position in the Mülkiye. He also remarried during this time. His second wife was Sabiha Hanım, the daughter of the Minister of Schools, Zeki Pasha. They had one son, Zeki Kuneralp, who was born in October 1914.

During World War I, Kemal kept a low profile and was not interested in politics, instead making a living as a teacher and merchant. This attitude continued until 1918, when the CUP leaders boarded a German submarine and escaped from Turkey.

== Collapse of the Empire ==
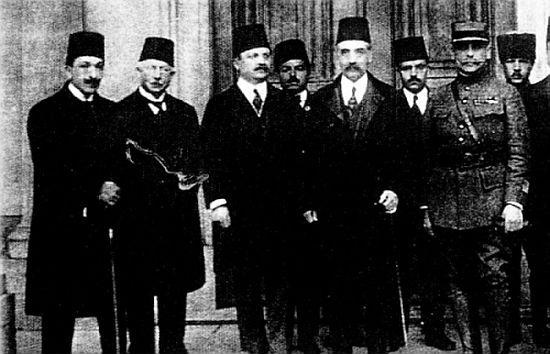
Ali Kemal and Damat Ferid Pasha

On a report dated 11 November 1918 (Armistice Day) speculating on the successor to Grand Vizier Ahmed İzzet Pasha, The Times reported that Kemal was backing Ahmet Tevfik Pasha to be grand vizier, with the support of the Naval and Khoja parties. Ali Kemal became the general secretary of the Freedom and Accord Party, which was reestablished on 14 January 1919. He was appointed Minister of Education in the first Damat Ferid Pasha government established on 4 March 1919, and as Minister of Interior in the second Ferid Pasha government established immediately after his attempted resignation in May. While Kemal was in this position, he issued orders against the National Forces of Mustafa Kemal Pasha (Atatürk). He resigned from the ministry on 26 June 1919 following a disagreement within the government.

As part of his campaigns against the Turkish national movement, along with other conservatives serving under the Sultan in Istanbul, Kemal set up an organisation known as the Friends of England Association (Turkish: İngiliz Muhipleri Cemiyeti), which advocated British protectorate status for the Ottoman Empire. Ali Kemal thought of Mustafa Kemal's movement as a continuation of the CUP. This, combined with his past opposition to the Unionists, made him anathema to the nationalist movement gathering strength in Ankara and fighting the Turkish War of Independence against the attempts between Greece and the Entente to partition Anatolia.

Kemal was a member of the Ottoman delegation to the Paris Peace Conference in June 1919. In an article dated 25 June 1919, The Times reported that Kemal had accused agents of the CUP of impeding the restoration of order in the Ottoman provinces, specifically accusing Talaat Pasha of organising Albanian brigand bands in İzmit and Enver Pasha of doing the same in the Bandırma, Balıkesir, and Karasi districts. He also alleged that the CUP had £700,000 of party funds available for propaganda, as well as numerous fortunes made by profiteering during the Great War. In fact, Kemal had resigned between the filing of the report and its publication in The Times on 3 July 1919.

After leaving the ministry, Ali Kemal returned to the editorship of Peyam-ı Sabah newspaper, whose editorship included Refik Halit (Karay) and Yahya Kemal (Beyatlı), and which was pro-Greek in sentiment. It was founded in 1920 by merging Kemal's defunct Peyam newspaper and the Sabah newspaper owned by Mihran Efendi, where he continued his attacks against the nationalist movement. The newspaper had correspondents in Athens and most notably interviewed the Greek Prime Minister Dimitrios Gounaris in 27 March 1921.

Ali Kemal was also the foremost critic of the Turkish National Movement, referring to its members as murderers, bandits and Bolshevik agents, while also calling for their harsh suppression and comparing them to Celalis. He wrote that "the army of Mustafa Kemal was formed from bandits, looters, criminals". In an August 1920 article, during the Greek Summer Offensive, he wrote: "No other description than madness can be given to the Ankara authorities' continuing to challenge the Greeks. When there is such a great difference between us and the Greeks in intellect, in learning, in strength, and in every conceivable respect, it is impossible to wage war against them". When the Greek Army was on the outskirts of Ankara after the Battle of Kütahya–Eskişehir, Ali Kemal wrote in 19 August 1921: "The Greeks have reached the gates of Ankara. There will be nowhere left for Mustafa Kemal to take refuge. The time for reckoning has come".

He continued his opposition even until 1922, when he wrote that "it was necessary to save the destiny of this nation from the hands of these irregulars". However, after the Great Offensive and the Turkish Capture of Smyrna, he partly backtracked, writing an article titled "Our Goals Were and Are One" (Turkish: Gayelerimiz Bir İdi ve Birdir); however, in the article he indicated that he still insisted on his former political views.

Kemal condemned the events of the Armenian genocide and inveighed against the Unionist chieftains as the authors of that crime, relentlessly demanding their prosecution and punishment. In an 18 July 1919 issue of the Alemdar, Ali Kemal Bey wrote: "... our Minister of Justice has opened the doors of prisons. Don't let us try to throw the blame on the Armenians; we must not flatter ourselves that the world is filled with idiots. We have plundered the possessions of the men whom we deported and massacred; we have sanctioned theft in our Chamber and our Senate. Let us prove that we have sufficient national energy to put the law into force against the heads of these bands who have trampled justice underfoot and dragged our honour and our national life through the dust." In a 28 January 1919 issue of the Sabah newspaper, Kemal Bey wrote, "Four or five years ago a historically singular crime has been perpetrated, a crime before which the world shudders. Given its dimensions and standards, its authors do not number in the fives, or tens, but in the hundreds of thousands. In fact, it has already been demonstrated that this tragedy was planned on the basis of a decision reached by the Central Committee of Union and Progress."

Due to his opposition to the Turkish National Movement, Ali Kemal was among the four Darülfünun faculty members compelled to resign by students in March 1922 for being insufficiently patriotic. Kemal and Cenâb Şehâbeddîn were dismissed from their duties by a decision of the Council of Ministers on 3 September 1922.

== Lynching ==
On 4 November 1922, Kemal was kidnapped from a barber shop at Tokatlıyan Hotel in Istanbul, and was carried to the Anatolian side of the city by a motorboat en route to Ankara for a trial on charges of treason. On 6 November 1922, the party was intercepted at İzmit by Nureddin Pasha, then the commander of the First Army, which was aligned with Mustafa Kemal Pasha. Ali Kemal was attacked and lynched, stoned to death by a group of paramilitary officers set up by Nureddin. As described by Nureddin personally to Rıza Nur, who with İsmet Pasha (İnönü) was on his way to Lausanne to negotiate peace with the Allies, his corpse was hanged with an epitaph across his chest which read, "Artin [an Armenian name] Kemal, traitor to religion and homeland". Upon İsmet Pasha's anger at this situation, his body was hurriedly removed, and was buried in İzmit. For a long time, it was unknown where he was buried due to the lack of a tombstone or any sign on his grave, but the burial location was determined in 1950.

Falih Rıfkı reported that Mustafa Kemal used to talk with disgust about Ali Kemal's lynching.

Ali Kemal's death was also memorialised in a poem by Nâzım Hikmet: "I saw the blood run down into his moustache. Someone yelled: 'Get him!' It rained sticks, stones and rotten vegetables. They hung his body from a branch over that bridge."

== Descendants and legacy ==
During the First World War, the Ottoman Empire was one of the Central Powers allied with the German Empire, and Kemal's son and daughter living in England adopted their maternal grandmother's maiden name of Johnson. His son Osman also began to use his middle name of Wilfred as his first name. Wilfred Johnson (d. 1992) later married Yvonne Eileen or Irene Williams (born in Versailles on 7 May 1907 and died in November 1987, the daughter of Stanley Fred Williams of Bromley, Kent (Croydon, London, 1880 - 1 November 1955), by his marriage in Paris in January 1905 to tennis player Marie Louise Caroline Helene de Pfeffel, Freiin von Pfeffel (Paris, 15 August 1882 - Carbis Bay, St Ives, Cornwall, 29 November 1944), one of two lawn tennis-playing sisters, the other being Yvonne Marie Renée de Pfeffel, Freiin von Pfeffel (9th arrondissement of Paris, 30 July 1883 - Truro, Cornwall, 1958, who was also a doctor and biologist, chief of the laboratory of the Hospital Bretonneau in Paris)), and their son Stanley Johnson became an expert on the environment and population studies and a Conservative member of the European Parliament. Johnson's son Boris Johnson, Kemal's great-grandson, became the prime minister of the United Kingdom on 24 July 2019. Kemal is also the great-grandfather of his siblings including Rachel, Jo, and Julia Johnson.

After the First World War, Kemal's half-English daughter Celma took Turkish nationality. The Surname Law of 1934 required her to adopt a Turkish surname, so she chose Kemal, her father's given name. She married Reginald St John Battersby. Their son Anthony Battersby served in the Royal Marines and became an architect and health planner, spending most of his career working as a public health consultant for various UN agencies.

Sabiha, Kemal's second wife, went into exile in Switzerland with their son Zeki Kuneralp. He returned to Turkey after the death of Atatürk and was admitted—with the personal approval of President İsmet İnönü—into the Turkish Diplomatic Service, serving twice as its Permanent Under-secretary in the 1960s and as ambassador to London from 1964 to 1966 and again from 1966 to 1972. His wife and her brother were killed when an unidentified ASALA militant opened fire on his car while he was serving as ambassador in Madrid in 1978.

Zeki Kuneralp wrote an account of his father's life in English for the benefit of the British side of the family. Kuneralp's sons Sinan and Selim both live in Turkey. The former is a publisher in Istanbul and the latter followed his father into the diplomatic service.

== Family tree ==
First marriage	Second marriage
Winifred Brun (1883–1909)	Ali Kemal (1867–1922)	Sabiha Hanım
Osman Wilfred Johnson (Osman Ali Kemal) (1909–1992)	Irene Williams	Zeki Kuneralp (1914–1998)	Necla Özdilci
Stanley Johnson (b. 1940)	Charlotte Fawcett	Sinan Kuneralp (b. 1948)	Selim Kuneralp (b. 1951)
Boris Johnson (b. 1964); Prime Minister of the UK	Jo Johnson (b. 1971)
