= List of ambassadors of Turkey to Switzerland =

The ambassador of Turkey to Switzerland is the official representative of the president of Turkey and the Turkish government to the head of state and government of Switzerland. The position is held by Emine Ece Özbayoğlu Acarsoy, who is the first woman to hold this office, presented her credentials to Guy Parmelin on 28 March 2021.

== List of ambassadors ==
Title	Name	Appointed or Presented credentials and Terminated mission	Ref.
Maslahatgüzar	Ahmet Rüştü Demirel	29.10.1923-17.6.1924	(Note: Temporary chargé d'affaires's not listed.)
Maslahatgüzar	Refik Birgen	17.6.1924-23.3.1925	(Note: Temporary chargé d'affaires's not listed.)
Elçi	Mehmet Münir Ertegün	23.3.1925-24.4.1929	(Note: Temporary chargé d'affaires's not listed.)
Elçi	Cemal Hüsnü Taray	31.10.1930-23.3.1936	(Note: Temporary chargé d'affaires's not listed.)
Elçi	Vasfi Menteş	19.8.1936-19.10.1942	(Note: Temporary chargé d'affaires's not listed.)
Elçi	Yakup Kadri Karaosmanoğlu	3.11.1942-30.9.1949	(Note: Temporary chargé d'affaires's not listed.)
Büyükelçi	Yakup Kadri Karaosmanoğlu	29.5.1951-13.7.1954	(Note: Temporary chargé d'affaires's not listed.)
Büyükelçi	Faik Zihni Akdur	12.10.1954-2.10.1957	
Büyükelçi	Fahreddin Kerim Gökay	30.11.1957-14.7.1960	
Büyükelçi	Zeki Kuneralp	16.8.1960-7.1.1964	
Büyükelçi	Adnan Kural	8.4.1964-4.7.1965	
Büyükelçi	Nejad Kemal Kavur	9.7.1965-26.12.1966	
Büyükelçi	Necmettin Tuncel	27.12.1966-16.7.1969	
Büyükelçi	Cemil Vafi	31.7.1969-13.7.1972	
Büyükelçi	Suat Bilge	29.9.1972-26.12.1979	
Büyükelçi	Doğan Türkmen	27.12.1979-1.1.1984	
Büyükelçi	Özdemir Yiğit	1.1.1984-1.1.1986	
Büyükelçi	Haydar Saltık	1.1.1986-1.1.1989	
Büyükelçi	Behiç Hazar	1.1.1989-1.1.1992	
Büyükelçi	Aydın Yeğen	1.1.1992-1.1.1993	
Büyükelçi	Kaya Toperi	1.1.1993-1.6.1993	
Büyükelçi	Rıza Türmen	1.1.1995-1.1.1996	
Büyükelçi	Taner Baytok	1.1.1996-1.1.1998	
Büyükelçi	Erdal Tümer	16.11.1998-1.8.2000	
Büyükelçi	Metin Örnekol	15.8.2000-16.11.2004	
Büyükelçi	Alev Kılıç	20.11.2004-14.6.2009	
Büyükelçi	Mustafa Oğuz Demiralp	9.10.2009-16.7.2010	
Büyükelçi	Tanju Sümer	1.8.2010-31.7.2014	
Büyükelçi	Mehmet Tuğrul Gücük	1.8.2014-2.8.2016	
Büyükelçi	İlhan Saygılı	14.11.2016-27.3.2021	
Büyükelçi	Emine Ece Özbayoğlu Acarsoy	28.3.2021	

== See also ==
List of ambassadors of Switzerland to Turkey
