= Reginald St John Battersby =

British Army officer

- Born: Reginald St John Beardsworth Battersby; 26 February 1900
- Died: 1 December 1977 (aged 77)
- Burial place: Chittoe, Wiltshire, England
- Military career
- Allegiance: United Kingdom
- Branch: British Army; Royal Navy
- Service years: 1915–1920; 1943–1945
- Rank: Lieutenant; Temporary chaplain
- Units: Manchester Regiment (1915); East Lancashire Regiment (1915–1918); Royal Engineers (1918–1920); Royal Naval Volunteer Reserve (1943–1945)
- Conflicts: First World War; Battle of the Somme; Operations on the Ancre; Second World War

Reginald St John Beardsworth Battersby (26 February 1900 – 1 December 1977) was, at the age of 15, the youngest known commissioned officer of the British Army of the First World War. He enlisted in the Manchester Regiment at the age of 14 and was promoted to lance corporal within a week. When his father realised what Battersby had done, he intervened and had him commissioned as an officer in the East Lancashire Regiment. Battersby was wounded in action leading a platoon over the top on the first day of the Somme but returned to duty to fight in the 1917 Operations on the Ancre. There, he was struck by shrapnel from a German shell, resulting in the amputation of his left leg. Battersby was asked to resign his commission owing to disability. He insisted he could still be useful to the army if fitted with a prosthetic leg and successfully returned to duty with a Royal Engineers transport unit. After the war, he studied theology and became a vicar at Chittoe, Wiltshire. During the Second World War, he organised the local Home Guard unit and, between 1943 and 1945, served as a chaplain to the Royal Marines at Chatham Dockyard.

== Early life ==
Reginald Battersby was born on 26 February 1900, the second son of the Reverend Walter Schofield Battersby and his wife Susannah. His father was the first vicar of Holy Trinity Church in Blackley, a suburb of Manchester, after a new parish was created from parts of the parishes of St Peter's, Blackley, and Christ Church, Harpurhey. His mother died in 1914 and Battersby was raised by his father alone.

== First World War ==
Battersby did not get along with his father and, on 30 January 1915, at 14, ran away from home to join the British Army. He enlisted at the recruiting office in Blackley, telling the sergeant on duty that he was a 19-year-old draper. Within a week, he had been promoted to lance corporal with the 14th (Reserve) Battalion of the Manchester Regiment at Whittington Barracks. Battersby's father discovered he had enlisted and rather than request his release from the army for being underage, instead insisted that his son be recommended for a commission as befitted his social standing. He arranged for the headmaster of Battersby's grammar school and the Lord Mayor of Manchester to support the application. The army approved the application, and Reginald Battersby was commissioned as a second lieutenant in the East Lancashire Regiment on 6 May 1915. At just 15 years old, he is thought to have been the youngest commissioned officer in the British Army of the First World War.

Battersby was posted to the 10th (Service) Battalion of the East Lancashire Regiment and was later transferred to the 3rd (Militia) Battalion to complete his training. He joined the regiment's 11th (Service) Battalion (Accrington) (commonly known as the Accrington Pals) for active duty in France on 18 April 1916. The unit, one of the so-called pals battalions of Kitchener's Army, was at that time in reserve at Béthencourt-sur-Somme. Battersby served with the unit in the trenches and on one occasion during a raid on the German front line with his batman was caught by an enemy patrol. The two men escaped by throwing pepper in the German soldiers' eyes. On another occasion, he recalled occupying trenches dug through a mass grave dating to the Franco-Prussian War and how the officers used the bones that protruded from the trench walls as coathooks.

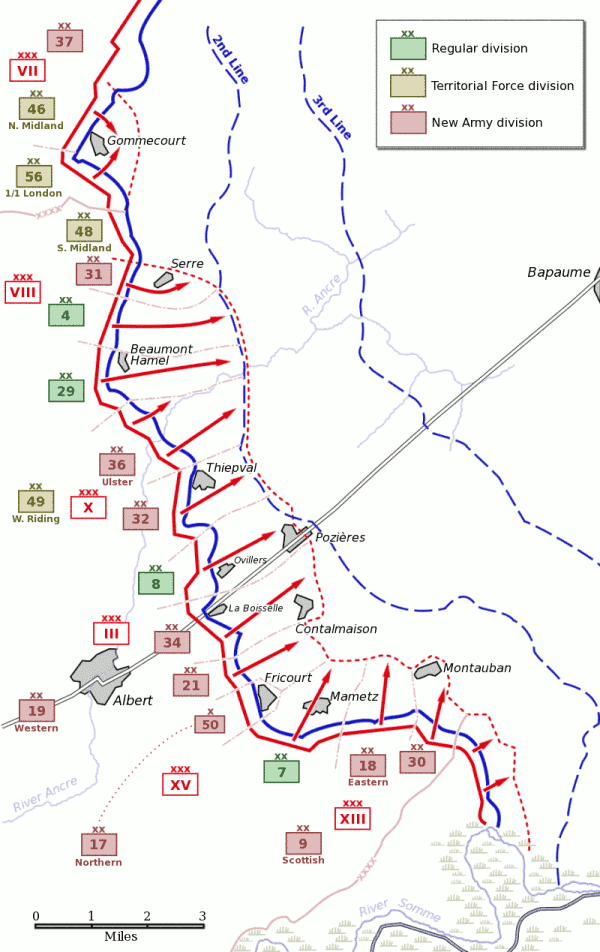
British objectives for the 1 July attack: the Accrington Pals formed part of the 31st Division, shown attacking Serre in the upper portion of the map

The battalion participated in the first day on the Somme offensive of 1 July 1916, and, at the age of 16, Battersby became the youngest officer to fight in that battle. He was placed in command of a 60-man platoon in C Company, made up largely of men from the Chorley area, and led them over the top of the reserve trenches at 7.30 am. Their objective was to cross the British front line trenches and assault the German defences at Serre-lès-Puisieux, some 500 yards away. Before they reached the last British trench, his platoon was hit by fire from a German machine gun that was methodically sweeping along the attacking troops, and Battersby fell, struck by bullets in his side, back, and left arm. He expected to be killed by the gun swinging back along the line, but it jammed at a critical moment, which he credited with saving his life. As he was wounded so close to the British lines, Battersby was able to be taken to the field dressing station at Railway Hollow where he received medical attention and was evacuated to England to convalesce. Returning to his battalion in France one month later, he found it much changed, some 75% of the unit having been wiped out in the attack.

Battersby and the Accrington Pals spent the winter of 1916–17 in the trenches opposite Serre, which survived repeated British attacks in that period. In March 1917 they were occupying Orchard Trench to the north of Serre at Puisieux-au-Mont. On 7 March he was at the battalion HQ, under a bridge across the British trench, when a German shell struck it. This killed or wounded all bar one of the officers present, including Battersby who was hit in his upper left leg by a piece of shrapnel. Battersby received treatment at the Number One Hospital in Étretat, where his leg was amputated before being evacuated to England. Around this time, his father died; he became estranged from his elder brother and went to live with an aunt. He was promoted to lieutenant on 1 July 1917. Battersby was asked by the army to relinquish his commission later that year owing to his wounds but replied that he would be capable of returning to duty if he received an artificial leg. He was fitted for a prosthetic limb and was passed fit for service on 13 March 1918, ten days later joining the Royal Engineers Record Office Transportation Branch. He remained with the Engineers until he resigned his commission in 1920.

== Post-war ==
After leaving the military, Battersby was admitted to King's College London to study theology, despite not having completed his secondary education. He was ordained as a priest in the Church of England in 1928 and served as a curate at Trowbridge, Wiltshire, and Beaminster, Dorset. Battersby was appointed vicar of Chittoe, Wiltshire in 1934. He married Celma Kemal, the daughter of Turkish politician Ali Kemal, who would become the aunt of writer Stanley Johnson and great aunt of British Prime Minister Boris Johnson. They had one son, Anthony, who later served in the Royal Marines. In his spare time, Battersby studied genealogy and was a heraldic artist.

During the Second World War, Battersby organised the Chittoe branch of the Home Guard, establishing its headquarters at the vicarage. He volunteered his services to the Royal Naval Volunteer Reserve in 1943, becoming a probationary temporary chaplain to the Royal Marines at Chatham Dockyard. He was promoted to temporary chaplain on 7 December 1944, with seniority backdated to 4 August, and remained in that rank until his resignation at the war's end in 1945. In the 1950s, Battersby served in the volunteer Civil Defence Corps and received the Civil Defence Medal for long service. Battersby retired from the church in 1972. He suffered from phantom pain in his missing leg, which forced him to take strong painkillers, and towards the end of his life suffered flashbacks to his time in the trenches. He died on 1 December 1977 and is buried under an oak tree in his churchyard at Chittoe, facing his parishioners.
