= Selim Kuneralp =

Turkish diplomat

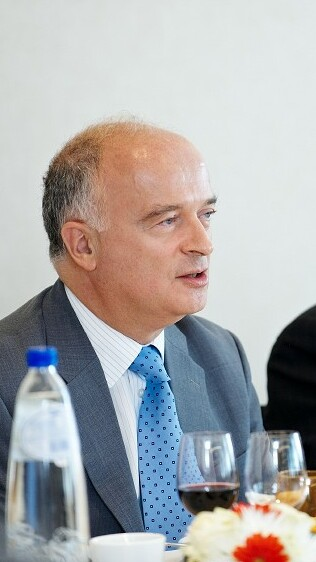
- Kuneralp in 2010

Permanent Representative of Turkey to the World Trade Organization
- In office May 2012 – February 2014

Personal details
- Born: 9 July 1951 (age 75) Prague, Czechoslovak Republic

Selim Kuneralp (born 9 July 1951) is a Turkish former diplomat.

== Early life ==
Kuneralp is the grandson of Ali Kemal and the son of Zeki Kuneralp. He graduated from Lycée Saint-Joseph, Istanbul in 1969. He graduated from the London School of Economics in 1973.

== Career ==
After various assignments at the Ministry of Foreign Affairs (as an ambassador), he served as the General Directorate for EU Affairs and ambassador in Sweden (2000–2003) and South Korea (2003–2005).

He served as the General Director of Policy Planning in 2006–2007 and as Deputy Undersecretary in charge of Economic Affairs between 2007 and 2009. He served as the Permanent Representative to the European Union from 1 November 2009 to 9 December 2011. He served as President of the Energy Charter Conference beginning in April 2010, and as the Deputy Secretary General of the Energy Charter between 1 December 2014 and 31 July 2016.

He became Advisor to the Ministry of Foreign Affairs at the beginning of 2012 and worked as Permanent Representative of Turkey to the World Trade Organization in May 2012 and continued this duty until February 2014. He was appointed as a member of the Foreign Policy Advisory Board on 15 July 2014. He retired in 2015.
