= 33rd government of Turkey =

Government of the Republic of Turkey (1971)

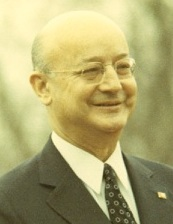
Nihat Erim

The 33rd government of Turkey (26 March 1971 – 11 December 1971) was a government in the history of Turkey. It is also called the First Erim government.

== Background ==
After the memorandum of the army on 12 March 1971, prime minister Süleyman Demirel of the Justice Party (AP) resigned, and a new government was founded by Nihat Erim, who had recently resigned from the Republican People's Party (CHP). However, his appointment caused unrest in CHP and Bülent Ecevit resigned from his post as the general secretary of his party to protest the appointment. Nevertheless, İsmet İnönü, the leader of the party, supported Nihat Erim and Erim formed a semi-technocratic government with the support of CHP, AP, and the National Reliance Party (MGP).

The cabinet was endorsed by the President Cevdet Sunay on 26 March 1971 and was given a vote of confidence in the National Assembly by 321 in favor and 46 against on 7 April.

== The government ==
In the list below, the serving period of cabinet members who served only a part of the cabinet's lifespan are shown in the column "Notes".

Title	Name	Party	Notes
Prime Minister	Nihat Erim	Independent	
Deputy Prime Minister
Deputy Prime Minister	Sadi Koçaş	CHP	
Deputy Prime Minister	Atilla Karaosmanoğlu; Ali Mesut Erez	Independent	26 March 1971 – 3 Dec 1971; 3 Dec 1971 – 11 Dec 1971
Minister of State
Minister of State	Mehmet Özgüneş	Independent	
Minister of State	Doğan Kitaplı	AP	26 March 1971 – 13 Oct 1971
Ministry of Justice	İsmail Arar	CHP	
Ministry of National Defense	Ferit Melen	CGP	
Ministry of the Interior	Hamdi Ömeroğlu	Independent	
Ministry of Foreign Affairs	Osman Olcay	Independent	
Ministry of Finance and Customs	Sait Naci Elgin	Independent	
Ministry of National Education	Şinasi Orel	Independent	
Ministry of Public Works	Cahit Karakaş; Mukadder Öztekin	AP; CHP	26 March 1971 – 10 Nov 1971; 10 Nov 1971 – 11 Dec 1971
Ministry of Construction and Settlement	Selahattin Babüroğlu	Independent	(Except for a 13-day duration in October)
Ministry of Health and Social Security	Türkan Akyol	Independent	
Ministry of Agriculture	Orhan Dikmen	Independent	
Ministry of Village Affairs	Cevdet Aykan	Independent	
Ministry of Forestry	Selahattin İnal	Independent	
Ministry of Transport	Haluk Arık; Selahattin Babüroğlu; Cahit Karakaş	Independent; Independent; CHP	26 March 1971 – 29 Sep 1971; 13 Oct 1971 – 27 Oct 1971; 10 Nov 1971 – 11 Dec 1971
Ministry of Labour	Atilla Sav	Independent	(Except for 13 day duration in October)
Ministry of Foreign Commerce	Özer Derbil	Independent	
Ministry of Industry and Technology	Ayhan Çilingiroğlu	Independent	
Ministry of Customs and Monopolies	Haydar Özalp	AP	
Ministry Tourism	Erol Yılmaz Akçal	AP	
Ministry of Culture	Talat Halman	Independent	
Ministry of Energy and Natural Resources	İhsan Topaloğlu; Atilla Sav; Nezih Devres	CHP	26 March 1970 – 29 Sep 1971; 13 Oct 1971 – 27 Oct 1971; 10 Nov 1971 – 11 Dec 1971
Ministry of Youth and Sports	Sezai Ergun	AP	

== Aftermath ==
Some of the technocrats in the cabinet (like Atilla Karaosmanoğlu) resigned, and Nihat Erim decided to form a new government.

== Trivia ==
Türkan Akyol, the Minister of Health, was the very first Turkish female cabinet minister in the history of Turkey.

Preceded by 32nd government of Turkey (Süleyman Demirel)	33rd Government of Turkey; 26 March 1971 – 11 December 1971)	Succeeded by 34th government of Turkey (Nihat Erim)
