= İlhami Sancar =

Turkish politician

Minister of National Defense
- In office 20 November 1961 – 20 February 1965
- Prime Minister: İsmet İnönü
- Preceded by: Muzaffer Alankuş
- Succeeded by: Hasan Dincer
- In office 13 April 1973 – 26 January 1974
- Prime Minister: Naim Talu
- Preceded by: Mehmet İzmen
- Succeeded by: Hasan Esat Işık
- In office 17 November 1974 – 31 March 1975
- Prime Minister: Sadi Irmak
- Preceded by: Hasan Esat Işık
- Succeeded by: Ferit Melen

Personal details
- Born: 1909 Gördes, Manisa Province, Ottoman Empire
- Died: 13 December 1986 (aged 76–77)
- Party: Republican People's Party (CHP); Reliance Party (CGP)
- Education: Law
- Alma mater: Ankara University, Law School
- Occupation: Politician
- Profession: Jurist

İlhami Sancar (1909 – 13 December 1986) was a Turkish judge, politician and former government minister.

== Early life ==
İlhami Sancar born in Gördes ilçe (district) of Manisa Province, Ottoman Empire in 1909. He completed his primary education in Kemalpaşa, and the secondary education in İzmir. He studied in Law School of Ankara University. After graduation in 1933, he served as a judge.

== Political career ==
He resigned from his court work, and joined the Republican People's Party (CHP). In 1949, he was elected as the chairman of CHP's Istanbul branch office. On 24 January 1961, he was appointed to the Constituent Assembly of Turkey as a CHP representative. During the post-military era, he served as a deputy of Istanbul Province in the 12th, and the 13th Parliament of Turkey between 1961 and 1969.

Following the split in his party, he broke away from CHP together with Turhan Feyzioğlu, and joined the Reliance Party (CGP). He continued as a deputy in the 14th, and the 15th Parliament of Turkey between 1969 and 1977.

== Minister of National Defense ==
Sancar was appointed five times as the Minister of National Defense. First three of these were in the 26th, 27th, and the 28th government of Turkey, as a member of CHP between 20 November 1961 and 20 February 1965. As a CGP member, he served in the 36th government of Turkey between 15 April 1973 and 26 January 1974, and in the 38th government of Turkey between 17 November 1974 and 31 March 1975.

He died on 13 December 1986.
