= Zeki Kuneralp =

Turkish diplomat (1914–1998)

Turkish Ambassador to Switzerland
- In office 1960–1964

Turkish Ambassador to the United Kingdom
- In office 1964–1966
- In office 1969–1972

Turkish Ambassador to Spain
- In office 1972–1979

Personal details
- Born: 5 October 1914 Istanbul, Ottoman Empire
- Died: 26 July 1998 (aged 83) Istanbul, Turkey
- Spouse: Necla Özdilci
- Children: Sinan Kuneralp, Selim Kuneralp
- Parents: Ali Kemal; Sabiha Hanım
- Relatives: Wilfred Johnson (half-brother); Stanley Johnson (half-nephew)
- Profession: Diplomat

Zeki Kuneralp (5 October 1914 – 26 July 1998) was a Turkish diplomat, who was brought up in exile in Switzerland after the murder of his father, Ali Kemal, during the Turkish War of Independence. After his education he returned to Turkey and, with the express approval of President İsmet İnönü, entered the Ministry of Foreign Affairs

At first taking up diplomatic posts throughout Europe, Kuneralp was later appointed Turkish Ambassador to Switzerland, the United Kingdom and Spain, as well as twice serving as Secretary-General of the Foreign Ministry. He survived an assassination attempt which claimed the lives of his wife and her brother in Madrid in 1978. He retired, in part due to ill-health, in 1979, renouncing the world and current affairs, and turning his attention instead to writing and publishing. His autobiography was translated into English in 1992, while others of his books are considered important sources of twentieth century Turkish history. He died in Istanbul in 1998.

== Biography ==
Born in Istanbul, Ottoman Empire in October 1914, Kuneralp was the second son of Ali Kemal, a journalist, writer, and politician, by his second wife, Sabiha Hanım. Ali Kemal was a political opponent of the nationalists at the time of the British, French, and Italian Occupation of Constantinople, during the Turkish War of Independence. He was detained when the revolutionaries won in 1922 and taken to Ankara to an Independence Tribunal, but the ferry (or train) he was put on stopped at Izmit and there he was murdered by young Turkish soldiers. After the kidnap and murder of his father his mother took the family into exile in Switzerland.

He began life as an Ottoman Turk with only given names. In 1924, the new state of Turkey adopted the Surname Law, requiring all its citizens to adopt a heritable family name, and he thus gained the name of Kuneralp. He was educated in Switzerland and in 1938 gained a Law doctorate from the University of Bern, where he belonged to the "Zähringia Bernensis" fraternity.

When permission for him to enter the Turkish Foreign Ministry was granted personally by President İsmet İnönü in 1942, Kuneralp began his career there, going on to become one of the most brilliant diplomats of his generation. Early in his career, he was posted to Bucharest, Prague, Paris, and Turkey's NATO Delegation. A believer in Turkish-Greek friendship, Kuneralp worked hard but unsuccessfully to repair the damage done to Turkish-Greek relations by the rift over Cyprus between 1954 and 1964.

He was ambassador to Bern from 1960 until 1964 when he was made ambassador to London from 1964 to 1966 and again from 1969 to 1972, while in the interval he served twice as Secretary-General (or permanent under-secretary) of the Foreign Ministry in Ankara. During the latter stage of his diplomatic life in London, Kuneralp began have progressive multiple sclerosis, which left him unable to walk without support.

In 1978, while Kuneralp was serving as ambassador in Madrid, three gunmen opened fire on his car one morning outside his home. The ambassador's wife, Necla Kuneralp, and her brother-in-law, retired Ambassador Beşir Balcıoğlu, were killed in the attack. Responsibility was claimed by a militant Armenian group, variously named as ASALA (Armenian Secret Army for the Liberation of Armenia) or the Justice Commandos Against Armenian Genocide. The attackers opened fire on Balcioglu, who was using crutches, perhaps supposing him to be Kuneralp. The attack was one of a series of assassinations of Turkish diplomats and officials during the 1970s and 1980s, and the first in which a non-Turk (Kuneralp's Spanish driver, Antonio Torres) was fatally injured.

Despite this tragedy, Kuneralp's intellectual distinction and energy remained as strong as ever. During his retirement he wrote several books, including an edited version of his father's autobiography and an autobiography of his own, as well as works on recent aspects of Turkish diplomatic history. His autobiography, Sadece Diplomat, was translated into English and appeared under the title "Just a Diplomat". He died in Istanbul of progressive multiple sclerosis.

An article, "Ambassador Extraordinary", describing his life and personality, was published after his death in Number 16 of the magazine Cornucopia, 1998, as well as a short volume of memoirs by his British and Turkish friends giving details of his career. This was published in 1998 by the Isis Press in Istanbul as Zeki Kuneralp 1914–1998: A Tribute by Friends and Family. One of his British friends, Sir Bernard Burrows, a former ambassador to Ankara, said that Kuneralp could best be described as a saint, adding that this was an unusual quality in a diplomat. Kuneralp always retained his affection for Switzerland, the country of his upbringing, and spoke the Swiss dialect of German fluently, sometimes startling groups of Swiss visitors.

Kuneralp had two sons who both survive him, Sinan, a leading Istanbul publisher, and Selim, who went into the diplomatic service and has been Turkey's ambassador to Sweden and South Korea.

He is also among founders of a Francophone High School in Ankara called "Lycée Tevfik Fikret"

Boris Johnson, Prime Minister of the United Kingdom, is Ali Kemal Bey's great-grandson and Kuneralp's great nephew.

== Bibliography ==
- Just a Diplomat (in Turkish) (1981) and (in English) (1992)
- Ali Kemal (1869–1922): a portrait for the benefit of his English speaking progeny (1993).
- A footnote to Turco-Greek history: the Keşan-Alexandroupolis talks (1998)
- Les debuts de la sovietisation de la Roumanie, aout 1944–aout 1945 (1992)

== See also ==
- List of Turkish diplomats
- List of assassinated people from Turkey
- List of ASALA attacks
