= Naim Talu =

15th Prime Minister of the Republic of Turkey from 1973 to 1974

15th Prime Minister of Turkey
- In office 15 April 1973 – 26 January 1974
- President: Fahri Korutürk
- Preceded by: Ferit Melen
- Succeeded by: Bülent Ecevit

Minister of Trade of Turkey
- In office 22 May 1972 – 15 April 1973
- Prime Minister: Ferit Melen

Minister of Trade of Turkey
- In office 11 December 1971 – 22 May 1972
- Prime Minister: Nihat Erim

Governor of the Central Bank of Turkey
- In office 14 July 1967 – 11 December 1971

Personal details
- Born: 22 July 1919 Istanbul, Ottoman Empire
- Died: 15 May 1998 (aged 78) Istanbul, Turkey
- Resting place: Zincirlikuyu Cemetery, Istanbul
- Spouse: Gevher Talu
- Children: 2
- Education: Kabataş Erkek Lisesi
- Alma mater: Istanbul University (BS)
- Profession: Economist

Mehmet Naim Talu (22 July 1919 – 15 May 1998) was a Turkish economist, banker, politician and former prime minister of Turkey.

== Biography ==
Naim Talu was born in Istanbul in 1919. He was educated at Kabataş Erkek Lisesi. After graduating with a degree in economics from Istanbul University in 1943, he worked for a while in Sümerbank, a state owned textile company. He transferred to the Central Bank of Turkey in 1946. He became the general director of the bank in 1967 after serving one year as deputy. Following the reorganization of the Central Bank in 1970, he was appointed Governor of this institution. He died in Istanbul in 1998.

== Political career ==
Naim Talu started his political career in 1971 by appointment to the ministry of trade in the second Erim cabinet. He kept his post also in the cabinet of Melen until President Cevdet Sunay admitted him to the Senate in 1972. Commissioned by President Fahri Korutürk following the resignation of Prime Minister Ferit Melen, he formed the 36th government on 15 April 1973 in consensus of the Justice Party with the Republican Reliance Party. His caretaker government lasted beyond the general elections in 1973, which did not set a clear majority for any party. With the forming of a coalition cabinet of the Republican People's Party along with the National Salvation Party under Bülent Ecevit on 26 January 1974, Talu's prime ministry ended. His membership in the Senate continued until 1976.

Naim Talu was a member of the board of Akbank, one of Turkey's largest banks, between 1974 and 1976, prior to his appointment as the chairman, which lasted until shortly before his death in 1998. He served the same period as a member of the board of trustees of the Sabancı Foundation (VakSA).

He was survived by his wife Gevher Talu and his two daughters Tülin Talu and Füsun San.

Government offices
Preceded by Ziyaettin Kayla	Governor of the Central Bank of Turkey; 14 July 1967–11 December 1971	Succeeded by Memduh Güpgüpoğlu
Political offices
Preceded by Ferit Melen	Prime Minister of Turkey; 15 April 1973–26 January 1974	Succeeded by Bülent Ecevit
