= Nihat Erim =

13th Prime Minister of the Republic of Turkey from 1971 to 1972

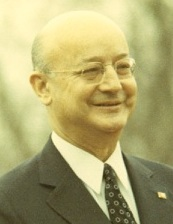
- Erim in 1972

13th Prime Minister of Turkey
- In office 26 March 1971 – 22 May 1972
- President: Cevdet Sunay
- Preceded by: Süleyman Demirel
- Succeeded by: Ferit Melen

Deputy Prime Minister
- In office 16 January 1949 – 22 May 1950
- Preceded by: Faruk Ahmet Barutçu
- Succeeded by: Samet Ağauğlu

Minister of Public Works
- In office 10 June 1948 – 16 January 1949
- President: İsmet İnönü
- Preceded by: Kasım Gülek
- Succeeded by: Hasan Şevket Adalan

Member of the Grand National Assembly
- In office 15 October 1961 – 14 October 1973
- In office 28 February 1943 – 14 May 1950
- Constituency: Kocaeli (1943, 1946, 1961, 1965, 1969)

Personal details
- Born: 30 November 1912 Kandıra, Hudavendigar, Ottoman Empire (modern Turkey)
- Died: 19 July 1980 (aged 67) Kartal, Istanbul Province, Turkey
- Resting place: Zincirlikuyu Cemetery, Istanbul
- Party: Independent
- Other political affiliations: Republican People's Party (CHP)
- Spouse: Kamile Okutman
- Children: 2
- Parent(s): Raif Bey (Father), Macide Hanım (Mother)
- Education: Galatasaray High School
- Alma mater: Istanbul University (LLB); University of Paris (PhD)
- Profession: Academic

İsmail Nihat Erim (30 November 1912 – 19 July 1980) was a Turkish politician and jurist. He served as the 13th prime minister of Turkey for almost 14 months after the 1971 Turkish military memorandum. He was assassinated by the Revolutionary People's Liberation Party/Front in Istanbul in 1980.

== Early life and education ==
Nihat Erim was born in Kandıra to Raif Bey and Macide Hanım. After graduating from Istanbul University Law School in 1936, he studied further to earn his doctorate degree in Paris Law School in 1939. He returned to Turkey to become an assistant professor in 1939 and professor in 1942 at the Ankara University Law School.

During his studies at the Istanbul University Erim was a member of the Turkish National Student Union.

== Political career ==
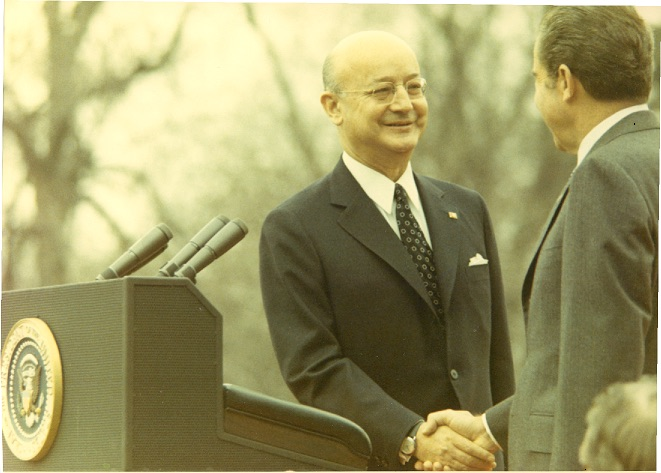
Nihat Erim on a visit in Washington D.C.

He was appointed as legal advisor to the Ministry of Foreign Affairs in 1943 while he was still in the university. He also served as an advisor in the Turkish committee at the conference on the founding of the United Nations in San Francisco in 1945. That same year, he was elected and served as the Kocaeli Province representative at the Turkish Parliament to join the Republican People's Party (Turkish: Cumhuriyet Halk Partisi, CHP) group at the parliament. In 1949, he served as the minister of public works and later as deputy prime minister.

In 1950, when CHP lost the majority in the parliament after the elections, he lost his seat and became the chief politics editor and leading writer of the newspaper "Ulus" ("Nation"). When it was closed down by the government, he went on to publish his own newspaper, "Yeni Ulus–Halkçı" ("New Nation–Populist") in 1953. In 1956, he participated at the negotiations on Cyprus in London, England. The same year, he was selected as the Turkish member of the European Commission on Human Rights to serve in this position until 1962. He led the Turkish committee on the preparation of the Cyprus constitution in 1959, following Zurich and London Agreements. He continued legally advising the Turkish committees at further negotiations on Cyprus at the United Nations.

After the military coup of 1960, once again he was elected and served as Kocaeli representative in the parliament, and this time as head of the CHP group. He was one of the focal points of internal conflicts of CHP, opposing the leader İsmet İnönü. The conflict resulted in him being ousted from the party in 1962. He was re-elected to the party's ruling committee taking second highest votes, thus joining the party again.

He served as the Turkish representative at the Council of Europe between 1961 and 1970, and was elected as deputy secretary general in 1961. In 1969, he was appointed as a member of the UN International Law Commission in The Hague, Netherlands.

In Turkey, after a spree of political violence, and the coup by memorandum, the army forced the resignation of prime minister Süleyman Demirel on 12 March 1971. Nihat Erim, while still at the university, was advised to withdraw from his post in the Republican People's Party (CHP) by the National Security Council, which was then heavily influenced by the military.

=== Prime minister ===
He was appointed a neutral and technocratic prime minister on 26 March 1971 to form a "national unity" coalition government (see 33rd government of Turkey), the first of a series of weak governments until the elections in 1973. During his tenure he ruled out the existence of another nationality living in Turkey and the Kurdish population in the country was oppressed. One of the actions in regards of the Kurdish question during Erim's prime ministry was the closing down of the Workers Party of Turkey (Turkish: Türkiye İşçi Partisi, TİP) for its recognition of the Kurds as a distinct ethnicity.

Erim was forced to resign when 11 technocratic ministers of his cabinet resigned as a body on 3 December 1971. However, he was appointed once more by the President Cevdet Sunay, and he formed his second cabinet on 11 December 1971. He resigned on 17 April 1972 on health grounds, when his decision to promulgate decree laws was not backed by the parliament. His resignation was approved on 22 May 1972, and Ferit Melen, representative of the Van Province and minister of national defense in his cabinet, was appointed as the new prime minister and formed his own cabinet.

During his premiership, a significant contribution he made to Turkish politics was to form a ministry of culture (today in the form of the Ministry of Culture and Tourism), which was until then a mere department within the ministry of education. He appointed Talat Halman, journalist-writer, as the minister to this newly formed post. His government's prohibition of opium poppy harvesting in June 1971 under US pressure fired controversy. A change in the constitution brought together a witch hunt for leftists, reaching its peak after the abduction and killing of the Israeli ambassador Efraim Elrom in May 1971.

== Assassination ==
Erim was shot to death by two gunmen near his home in Kartal, Istanbul on 19 July 1980. Radical leftist Turkish militant group Dev Sol (Revolutionary Left) claimed responsibility for the attack. The assassination might have accelerated the military coup on September 12 of that year led by chief of staff Kenan Evren. The motive behind the assassination is thought to be related to the approval by the parliament of the execution of three leftist militants, one being Deniz Gezmiş, during his service as prime minister.

Erim's assassination was part of the wave of political violence in Turkey in the late 1970s between left-wing Marxist and right-wing ultranationalist groups.

== Personal life ==
Erim was married to Kamile Okutman, having two children: Işık Erim and Işıl Onalp (née Erim), as well as five grandchildren and ten great-grandchildren.

== See also ==
- List of assassinated people from Turkey

== Books ==
- Le Positivisme Juridique et le Droit International (Judicial Positivism and International Law), 1939.
- XVII. Yüzyıldan Zamanımııza Kadar Tabii Hukuk Nazariyeleri (Natural Theories of Law from 17th Century Until Today), translation from Le Fur, 1940.
- Amme Hukuku Dersleri (Public Law Lessons), 1941.
- Devletlerarası Amme Hukuku (International Public Law), translation from Le Fur, 1944.
- Siyasi Tarih ve Devletlerararası Hukuk Metinleri (Political History and International Law Texts), 1953.

Political offices
Preceded by Faruk Ahmet Barutçu	Deputy Prime Minister of Turkey; 16 January 1949–22 May 1950	Succeeded by Samet Ağaoğlu
Preceded by Süleyman Demirel	Prime Minister of Turkey; 26 March 1971–22 May 1972	Succeeded by Ferit Melen
