= Ferit Melen =

14th Prime Minister of the Republic of Turkey from 1972 to 1973

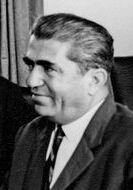
- Melen in 1963

14th Prime Minister of Turkey
- In office 22 May 1972 – 15 April 1973
- President: Cevdet Sunay; Fahri Korutürk
- Preceded by: Nihat Erim
- Succeeded by: Naim Talu

Minister of National Defense
- In office 26 March 1971 – 22 May 1972
- Prime Minister: Nihat Erim
- Preceded by: Ahmet Topaloğlu
- Succeeded by: Mehmet İzmen
- In office 31 March 1975 – 21 June 1977
- Prime Minister: Süleyman Demirel
- Preceded by: İlhami Sancar
- Succeeded by: Hasan Esat Işık

Minister of Finance
- In office 25 June 1962 – 20 February 1965
- Prime Minister: İsmet İnönü
- Preceded by: Şefik İnan
- Succeeded by: İhsan Gürsan

Member of the Grand National Assembly
- In office 6 November 1983 – 29 November 1987
- In office 27 October 1957 – 27 May 1960
- In office 14 May 1950 – 2 May 1954
- Constituency: Van (1950, 1957, 1983)

Personal details
- Born: 2 November 1906 Van, Ottoman Empire
- Died: 3 September 1988 (aged 81)
- Party: Republican People's Party (1950–1967); Reliance Party (1967–1971); National Reliance Party (1973–1973); Republican Reliance Party (1973–1980); Nationalist Democracy Party (1983–1986)
- Children: 2, including Mithat Melen
- Education: Ankara University

Ferit Sadi Melen (2 November 1906 – 3 September 1988) was a Turkish civil servant, politician and Prime Minister of Turkey.

== Biography ==
After graduating from high school in Bursa, he obtained a degree in finance from the School of Political Science at Ankara University in 1931. Ferit Melen entered the state service right after his graduation, and was sent to Paris, France, for an internship at the Ministry of Finance there. After one year, he returned home and worked in several services of the Ministry of Finance as an inspector. In 1943, he was promoted to general director in the ministry.

Ferit Melen entered politics as a deputy from Van Province from the Republican People's Party (Cumhuriyet Halk Partisi, CHP) following the 1950 general election. After the end of the legislative term, he did not run for the parliament in the 1954 election, and he returned to his profession to work as a chartered accountant. He practiced until his retirement in 1959. In 1957, he was elected once again to the parliament as deputy from Van.

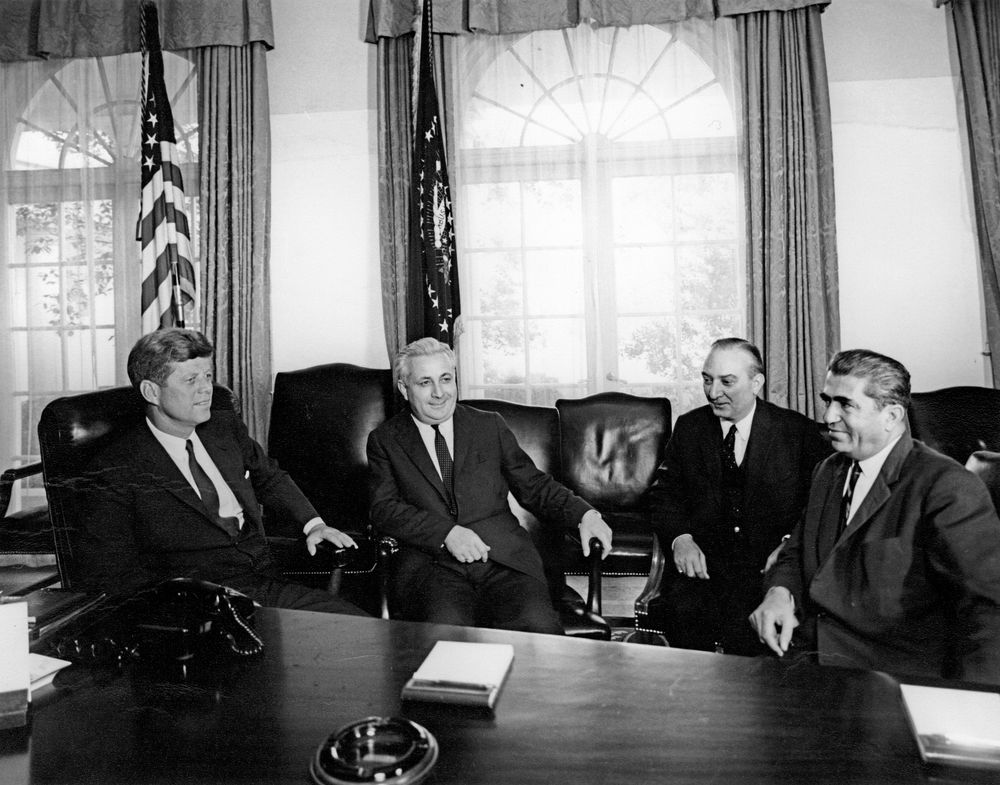
Finance Minister Melen with U.S. President John F. Kennedy, Turkish Deputy Prime Minister Ekrem Alican and Turkish ambassador Turgut Menemencioğlu in White House, Washington, D.C.

Ferit Melen was minister of finance in the two cabinets of İsmet İnönü between 25 June 1962 and 20 February 1965 in the 27th and 28th governments without affiliation to the parliament. He left his party CHP along with 47 other colleagues to co-found on 12 May 1967 "Güven Partisi" GP ("Reliance Party"), which was renamed Republican Reliance Party (Cumhuriyetçi Güven Partisi, CGP) after merging with "Cumhuriyetçi Parti" CP ("Republican Party") on 28 February 1973.

He served as minister of national defense in the cabinet of Nihat Erim from 26 March 1971 to 22 May 1972. Following the resignation of Nihat Erim, he was appointed prime minister of a military-approved coalition government that lasted until 15 April 1973. Between 31 March 1975 and 21 June 1977, he served a second time as minister of national defense in the cabinet of Süleyman Demirel.

In the time from 7 June 1964 to 14 October 1979, Ferit Melen was a member of the senate representing Van Province. On 12 July 1980, he was appointed again senator that ended on 12 September 1980 with the military coup. Ferit Melen was elected to Turkish Grand National Assembly in the 1983 elections as a candidate of the Nationalist Democracy Party (MDP).

The Van airport was renamed after him. In 2002, his son Mithat Melen, a former high ranked civil servant and academic, tried to enter politics with the Nationalist Movement Party (MHP).

== See also ==
- Biyografi.info - Biography of Ferit Melen (in Turkish)
- Terms of office
- (in Turkish)

Political offices
Preceded by Osman Şefik İnan	Minister of Finance of Turkey; 25 June 1962–20 February 1965	Succeeded by İhsan Gürsan
Preceded by Ahmet Topaloğlu	Minister of National Defense of Turkey; 26 March 1971–22 May 1972	Succeeded by Mehmet İzmen
Preceded by Nihat Erim	Prime Minister of Turkey; 22 May 1972–15 April 1973	Succeeded by Naim Talu
Preceded by İlhami Sancar	Minister of National Defence of Turkey; 31 March 1975–21 June 1977	Succeeded by Hasan Esat Işık
