= Permanent Mission of Turkey to the United Nations =

Permanent mission of Turkey to the UN

Permanent Mission of Turkey to the United Nations Türkiye Cumhuriyeti Birleşmiş Milletler Daimi Temsilciliği
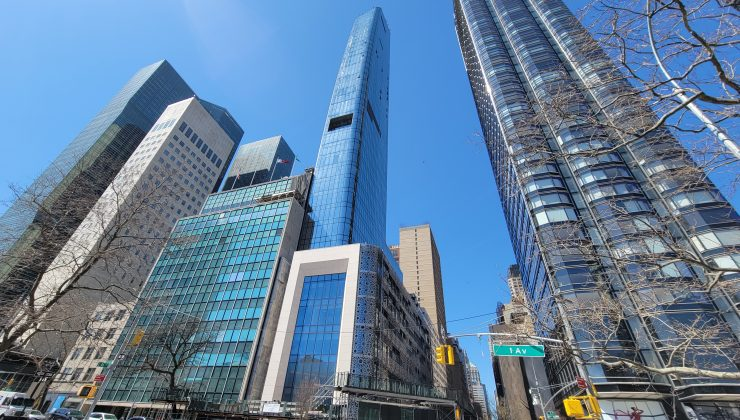
- Permanent Mission of Turkey is located in the Turkish House
- Location: New York City, United States
- Address: 821 United Nations Plaza, New York, NY 10017
- Coordinates: 40.751370°N 73.968380°W
- Opened: 1947
- Permanent representative: Ahmet Yıldız
- Website: Official website

The Permanent Mission of Turkey to the United Nations is the diplomatic mission of Turkey to the United Nations in New York. The Mission is represented by the permanent representative. The current Turkish permanent representative to the United Nations is Ahmet Yıldız.

== Location ==
The new building of the Permanent Mission is located on the 10th floor of 821 United Nations Plaza in Manhattan, New York, across the street from United Nations Headquarters. The building was designed by Perkins Eastman and its construction began on September 18, 2017. Turkish President Recep Tayyip Erdoğan and UN secretary-general António Guterres formally opened the center on September 20, 2021.

== History ==
Turkey was one of the original members of the United Nations, having been present at the United Nations Conference on International Organization. It officially became a member of the United Nations on November 7, 1945.

The first Permanent Representative of Turkey at the United Nations was Selim Sarper, who started its activities after presenting his letter of credence to the UN Secretary-General on 15 August 1947.

Since joining the organization, Turkey has been one of its biggest proponents. It has repeatedly stressed that the United Nations should be the highest multilateral forum for seeking collective solutions to global problems, as well as providing the best framework for agreeing upon common strategies. Additionally, Turkey has participated in all major United Nations bodies since 1946, and has been ranked among the world's biggest contributors to the United Nations budget. In 2021, it contributed $39.6 million to the regular budget. By increasing its contribution, Turkey gained membership of the Geneva Group in 2014. The Geneva Group consists of the largest budgetary contributors to the United Nations and focusses on the efficiency of the UN as well as its administrative and financial policies.

In its history at the United Nations, Turkey has sat on the Security Council four times, and on the Economic and Social Council 7 times. It has also presided once over the General Assembly as President of the General Assembly.

== See also ==
- Foreign relations of Turkey
- Turkey and the United Nations
- List of diplomatic missions of Turkey
