= List of ambassadors of Turkey to the United Nations =

Top Turkish representative at the United Nations

Permanent Representative of Turkey to the United Nations
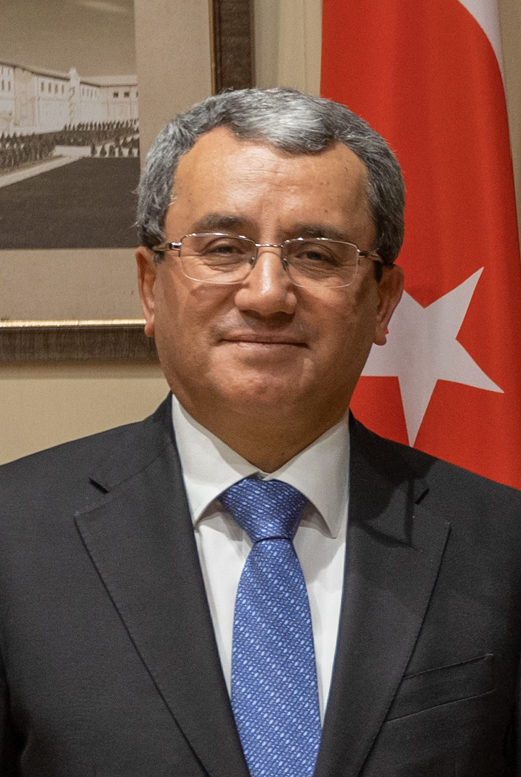
- Incumbent; Ahmet Yıldız since April 25, 2024
- Ministry of Foreign Affairs; Permanent Mission of Turkey to the United Nations
- Style: Mister/Madam Ambassador (informal); His/Her Excellency (diplomatic)
- Residence: Turkish House
- Seat: 821 United Nations Plaza; New York, New York, U.S.
- Nominator: President
- Appointer: President
- Term length: No fixed term
- Precursor: Chief of Delegation to the League of Nations
- Formation: 1947
- First holder: Selim Sarper
- Deputy: Deputy Permanent Representative
- Website: turkuno.dt.mfa.gov.tr

The ambassador of Turkey to the United Nations is the leader of the delegation of Turkey, the Permanent Mission of Turkey to the United Nations. The position is formally known as the permanent representative of the Republic of Türkiye (Note: The United Nations, along with the government of Turkey, uses the Turkish word Türkiye in diplomatic contexts. The title of this office is therefore Permanent Representative of Türkiye. This is in line with the official name of Turkey: the Republic of Türkiye.) to the United Nations, with the rank and status of ambassador extraordinary and plenipotentiary, and representative of Turkey through its non-permanent seat on the United Nations Security Council and in the plenary meetings of the General Assembly.

The current Permanent Representative of Türkiye (Note: The United Nations, along with the government of Turkey, uses the Turkish word Türkiye in diplomatic contexts. The title of this office is therefore Permanent Representative of Türkiye. This is in line with the official name of Turkey: the Republic of Türkiye.) to the United Nations since 25 April 2024 is Ahmet Yıldız.

== History ==
On 26 June 1945, the Charter of the United Nations was signed and came into force on 28 September 1945. Turkey was among the first countries that signed the United Nations Charter, becoming a founding member of the United Nations among 51 countries.

Permanent Mission of Turkey to the United Nations started its activities after the Permanent Representative Ambassador Selim Sarper presented his letter of credence to the Secretary-General of the United Nations on 15 August 1947.

== List of permanent representatives ==
The following diplomats served as the permanent representative of Turkey to the United Nations:

#	Ambassador	Years served	UN Secretary-General	Turkish President
1	Selim Sarper	1947–1957	(Norway) Trygve Lie	İsmet İnönü
1	Selim Sarper	1947–1957	(Norway) Trygve Lie	Celâl Bayar
1	Selim Sarper	1947–1957	(Sweden) Dag Hammarskjöld	Celâl Bayar
2	Seyfullah Esin	1957–1960	(Sweden) Dag Hammarskjöld	Celâl Bayar
3	Turgut Menemencioğlu	1960–1962	(Sweden) Dag Hammarskjöld	Cemal Gürsel
3	Turgut Menemencioğlu	1960–1962	(Myanmar) U Thant	Cemal Gürsel
4	Adnan Kural	1962–1964	(Myanmar) U Thant	Cemal Gürsel
5	Orhan Eralp	1964–1969	(Myanmar) U Thant	Cemal Gürsel
5	Orhan Eralp	1964–1969	(Myanmar) U Thant	Cevdet Sunay
6	Ümit Haluk Bayülken	1969–1972	(Myanmar) U Thant	Cevdet Sunay
6	Ümit Haluk Bayülken	1969–1972	(Austria) Kurt Waldheim	Cevdet Sunay
7	Osman Olcay	1972–1975	(Austria) Kurt Waldheim	Cevdet Sunay
7	Osman Olcay	1972–1975	(Austria) Kurt Waldheim	Fahri Korutürk
8	İlter Türkmen	1975–1978	(Austria) Kurt Waldheim	Fahri Korutürk
9	Orhan Eralp	1978–1980	(Austria) Kurt Waldheim	Fahri Korutürk
10	Ali Coşkun Kırca	1980–1985	(Austria) Kurt Waldheim	Kenan Evren
10	Ali Coşkun Kırca	1980–1985	(Peru) Javier Pérez de Cuéllar	Kenan Evren
11	İlter Türkmen	1985–1988	(Peru) Javier Pérez de Cuéllar	Kenan Evren
12	Mustafa Akşin	1988–1993	(Peru) Javier Pérez de Cuéllar	Kenan Evren
12	Mustafa Akşin	1988–1993	(Peru) Javier Pérez de Cuéllar	Turgut Özal
12	Mustafa Akşin	1988–1993	(Egypt) Boutros Boutros-Ghali	Turgut Özal
13	İnal Batu	1993–1995	(Egypt) Boutros Boutros-Ghali	Süleyman Demirel
14	Hüseyin Çelem	1995–1998	(Egypt) Boutros Boutros-Ghali	Süleyman Demirel
14	Hüseyin Çelem	1995–1998	(Ghana) Kofi Annan	Süleyman Demirel
15	Volkan Vural	1998–2000	(Ghana) Kofi Annan	Süleyman Demirel
16	Ümit Pamir	2000–2004	(Ghana) Kofi Annan	Ahmet Necdet Sezer
17	Baki İlkin	2004–2009	(Ghana) Kofi Annan	Ahmet Necdet Sezer
17	Baki İlkin	2004–2009	(South Korea) Ban Ki-moon	Ahmet Necdet Sezer
17	Baki İlkin	2004–2009	(South Korea) Ban Ki-moon	Abdullah Gül
18	Ertuğrul Apakan	2009–2012	(South Korea) Ban Ki-moon	Abdullah Gül
19	Yaşar Halit Çevik	2012–2016	(South Korea) Ban Ki-moon	Abdullah Gül
19	Yaşar Halit Çevik	2012–2016	(South Korea) Ban Ki-moon	Recep Tayyip Erdoğan
20	Feridun Sinirlioğlu	2016–2023	(South Korea) Ban Ki-moon	Recep Tayyip Erdoğan
20	Feridun Sinirlioğlu	2016–2023	(Portugal) António Guterres	Recep Tayyip Erdoğan
21	Sedat Önal	2023–2024	(Portugal) António Guterres	Recep Tayyip Erdoğan
22	Ahmet Yıldız	2024–present	(Portugal) António Guterres	Recep Tayyip Erdoğan

== List of permanent representatives in Geneva ==
The permanent representative of Turkey to the United Nations in Geneva is the ambassador responsible for representing Turkey at the United Nations Office at Geneva (UNOG).

#	Ambassador	Term start	Term end	Ref.
1	Özdemir Benler	9 April 1967	28 April 1970	
2	Coşkun Kırca	29 April 1970	29 August 1976	
3	Ercüment Yavuzalp	10 September 1976	23 July 1979	
4	Kamuran İnan	26 July 1979	19 September 1983	
5	İlter Türkmen	13 December 1983	25 August 1985	
6	Ercüment Yavuzalp	2 February 1985	23 September 1989	
7	Cem Duna	26 September 1989	7 July 1991	
8	Gündüz Aktan	30 July 1991	20 May 1995	
9	Tugay Uluçevik	25 May 1995	30 April 1998	
10	Murat Sungar	1 May 1998	16 October 2002	
11	Türkekul Kurttekin	1 November 2002	30 November 2006	
12	Ahmet Üzümcü	14 December 2006	12 July 2010	
13	Mustafa Oğuz Demiralp	29 July 2010	16 August 2013	
14	Mehmet Ferden Çarıkçı	22 August 2013	7 November 2016	
15	Ali Naci Koru	17 November 2016	20 July 2018	
16	Sadık Arslan	4 February 2019	27 January 2023	
17	Güven Begeç	29 January 2023	1 June 2024	
18	Burak Akçapar	13 June 2024	Present	

== See also ==
- Permanent Mission of Turkey to the United Nations
- Turkey and the United Nations
- Foreign relations of Turkey
- List of diplomatic missions of Turkey
- List of current permanent representatives to the United Nations
- United Nations Office at Geneva
- Ministry of Foreign Affairs
