= Sinirlioğlu =

Sinirlioğlu is a surname. Notable people with the surname include:

- Ayşe Sinirlioğlu (born 1956), Turkish diplomat
- Feridun Sinirlioğlu (born 1956), Turkish diplomat and politician
