= Ahmet Yıldız =

Ahmet Yıldız may refer to:

- Murder of Ahmet Yıldız, the first homicide in Turkey that was classified as a gay honor killing.
- Ahmet Yıldız (politician, born 1921), Turkish politician born in 1921.
- Ahmet Yıldız (writer), Turkish writer, poet and editor-in-chief.
- Ahmet Yıldız (politician, born 1964), Turkish politician and bureaucrat born in 1964.
- Ahmet Yıldız (scientist), Turkish-American scientist.
