= BKV =

BKV may refer to:

- BKV Corporation, an energy company that plans to achieve net-zero carbon emissions by the 2030s. Based in Denver, Colorado, United States
- Bennett Kuhn Varner, a marketing agency based in Atlanta, Georgia, United States
- BK virus, a member of the polyomavirus family
- BKV Norrtälje, a football club based in Norrtälje, Sweden
- Brian K Vaughan, American comic book writer
- Brooksville–Tampa Bay Regional Airport, an airport in Florida, United States
- Budapesti Közlekedési Zrt., a public transport operator in Budapest, Hungary
