= Geneva Group =

Geneva Group may refer to:

- Macedonian Secret Revolutionary Committee, also called the Geneva group
- The Geneva Group (United Nations)
