= Eicoff =

Advertising agency

- Type: Public Company
- Industry: Marketing and advertising
- Founded: 1959
- Founder: Alvin Eicoff
- Headquarters: 333 N. Green St. Chicago, IL 60641, United States
- Key people: William McCabe (CEO and President); Delia Marshall (Chief Operating Officer); Margaret Firalio (SVP Director of Media); Kelly Dulin (SVP Director of Media); Mike Powell (Executive Creative Director); Rob Schmidt (SVP Management Supervisor); Matt Cote (SVP Director of Video Innovation)
- Number of employees: 100
- Parent: The Ogilvy Group, Inc.
- Website: www.eicoff.com

Eicoff (previously A. Eicoff & Company) is one of the top ten advertising agencies in Chicago. It specializes in direct response television (DRTV) advertising. It is known as the firm that popularized 1-800 call numbers and claims to have coined the "… or your money back" catchphrase.

old logo

Eicoff is based in Chicago, Illinois. Alvin Eicoff, the father of DRTV advertising, founded A. Eicoff & Company in 1959.

Today, the company is led by CEO William McCabe and employs 120 people.

== History ==
Alvin Eicoff, the father of DRTV advertising, founded the company in 1959. The agency specialized in direct-response advertising, featuring 60-second to two-minute spots with calls-to-action for viewers. In 1977, AT&T approached A. Eicoff & Company to use 1–800 numbers in its commercials. The 1-800-number model made it possible for advertisers to use the same ad spot nationwide with a centralized call center. The company also claims to have coined the famous "…or your money back!" guarantee at the end of commercials.

In the late 1970s, Eicoff launched the world's first infomercial. The spot was a 30-minute product demonstration for New Generation, a hair product to reverse baldness. In 1981, Eicoff client Time-Life became the first national direct-response advertiser in cable history. In January 1982, Ron Bliwas took over as the company's president and CEO. Later that year, Ogilvy & Mather (now the Ogilvy Group) acquired the company and marked a switch in the agency's focus. In the Chicago Tribune, Bliwas said:

"When I became the CEO, I really changed the direction of the agency… we were not going to do slicers and dicers and records. We were going to try to attract Fortune 500 companies."

In March 2012, Bliwas stepped down. He had been with A. Eicoff & Co. for 37 years and had served as its head for 27 years. He continues to serve as Acting chairman. William McCabe, who specializes in digital media, took over from Bliwas. McCabe previously served as the company's Executive Vice President and COO.

Eicoff has approximately 100 employees. Some of the company's most notable clients have included Quicken Loans, UnitedHealthcare, K-12, Sears, and Chase. However, in 2019, one of its longest-tenured clients, Jelmar, ended their 51 year relationship and decided to partner with the Pittsburgh-based Marc USA.

In 2022, Eicoff helped Ogilvy run it's Super Bowl commercials by handling media buys.

=== Alvin Eicoff ===
Alvin Eicoff (1921–2002) is widely regarded as the father of late-night, direct response advertising. His approach was based on product demonstrations and a prominently featured phone number for orders. Eicoff's ads became the model for modern infomercials. Eicoff started his career in the radio advertising industry. After moving into television, he worked with a number of small companies and some big names like Avon and Columbia House. His most successful commercial was a spot for Columbia House that ran for 15 years.

In 1959, Eicoff founded A. Eicoff and Company, which became a division of Ogilvy & Mather in 1981.

Eicoff advocated the 120-second commercial with a 30-second tag line and a phone number. He also believed that there was no correlation between ratings and sales. Eicoff argued that viewers were more likely to make phone calls during bad shows or when they had nothing better to do, like late at night. In 1982, Eicoff wrote a guide to successful advertising that was published by Crown. The book was titled "…or Your Money Back," the famous phrase that Eicoff coined and included at the end of every commercial.

Alvin Eicoff was born in Lewistown, Montana, and died at 80 in Highland Beach, Florida. He was survived by his wife and two sons.

== Awards and recognition ==
In 1997, Eicoff was inducted into the Direct Marketing Association's Hall of Fame.

In 2004, the DMA created the A. Eicoff Broadcast Innovation Award, an annual ECHO award to recognize innovation in direct broadcast media. The DMA Broadcast Council and the ECHO Committee choose each year's awardee from the Gold, Silver and Bronze winners.

In 2005, Eicoff's then-chairman Ron Bliwas became the DMA's chairman of the board. In 2007, he was inducted into the DMA's Hall of Fame.
