= Ertuğrul Apakan =

Turkish diplomat

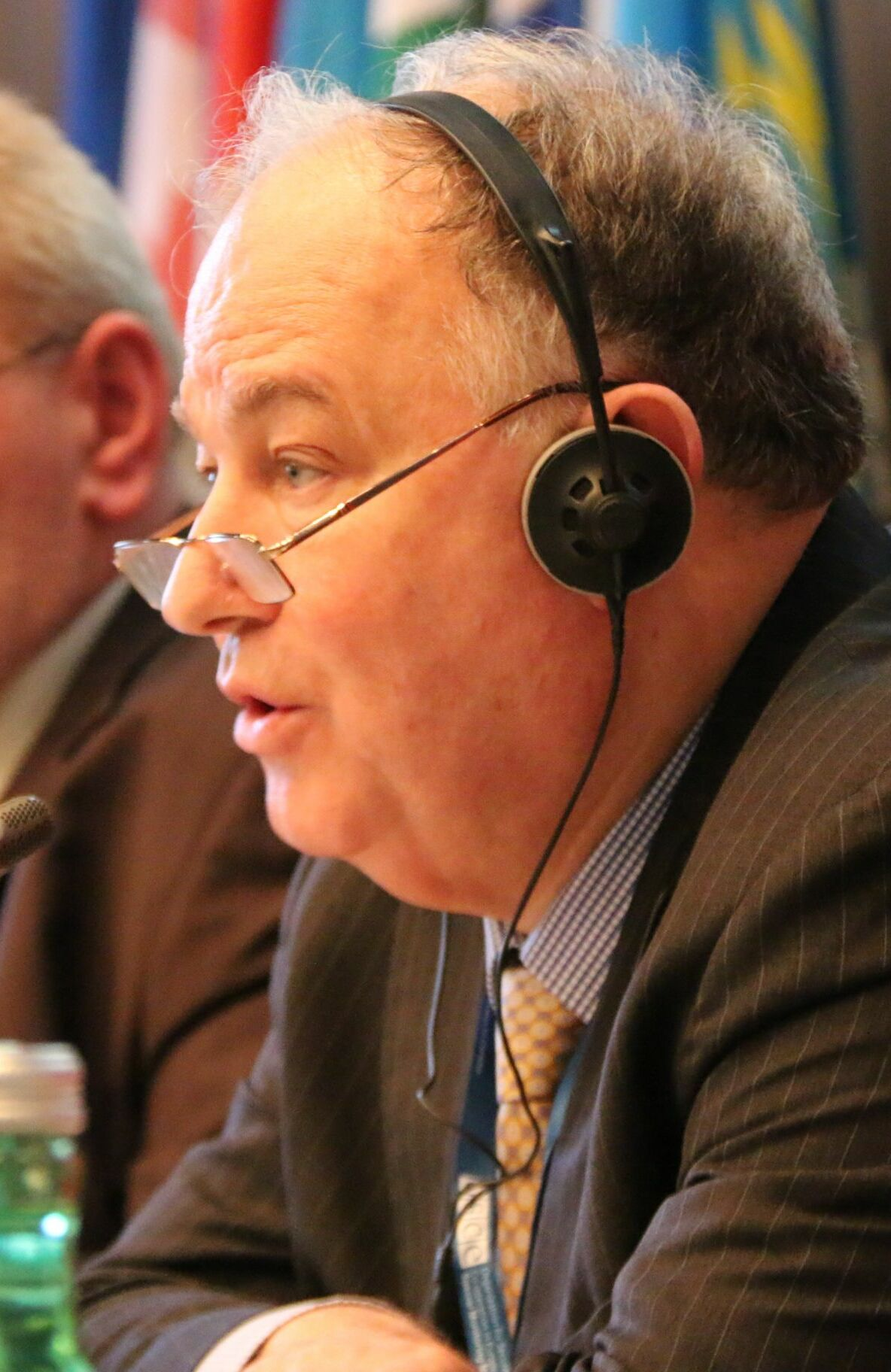
- Apakan in February 2015

Permanent Representative of Turkey to the United Nations
- In office September, 2009 – September 2012
- Preceded by: Baki İlkin
- Succeeded by: Yaşar Halit Çevik

Undersecretary of the Ministry of Foreign Affairs
- In office December 2006 – August 2009
- Preceded by: Uğur Ziyal
- Succeeded by: Feridun Sinirlioğlu

Personal details
- Born: 1947 (age 78–79) Bornova, İzmir Province, Turkey
- Spouse: Lale Apakan
- Children: Two
- Education: Ankara University
- Profession: Foreign Affairs

Ertuğrul Apakan (born 1947) is a Turkish diplomat. Apakan was the Chief Monitor of the OSCE Special Monitoring Mission to Ukraine between 2 April 2014 and 30 May 2019.

Apakan has had a longstanding diplomatic career, most recently as the Permanent Representative of Turkey to the United Nations (2009 – 2012) and as Undersecretary at the Turkish Ministry of Foreign Affairs (2006 – 2009).

== Early history and professional life ==
Apakan was born in Bornova, İzmir Province, Turkey. He graduated from Bornova Anatolian High School and Ankara University, Faculty of Political Science (1969), and completed his master's degree in economics at the Ege University in İzmir.

Apakan joined the Turkish Foreign Ministry in 1971. After many diplomatic duties, he was the ambassador to Northern Cyprus from 1996 to 2000. Apakan served as Deputy Under-Secretary for Bilateral Political Affairs from 2004 to 2006 and as the Under-Secretary of the Ministry of Foreign Affairs of Turkey from December 2006 until August 2009. He became the Permanent Representative of Turkey to the United Nations in New York in August 2009. In September 2010, Apakan was the President of the United Nations Security Council. He also chaired the United Nations Security Council Counter-Terrorism Committee in 2010.

On 2 April 2014, he was appointed Chief Monitor of the OSCE Special Monitoring Mission to Ukraine by OSCE Chairperson-in-Office. He was replaced in this position by Yaşar Halit Çevik in 2019.
