= Turkey and the United Nations =

Republic of Türkiye

United Nations membership
- Membership: Full member
- Since: 24 October 1945
- Former name(s): Republic of Turkey (1945–2022)
- UNSC seat: Non-permanent
- Permanent Representative: Sedat Önal

The Republic of Türkiye is one of the 51 founding members of the United Nations when it signed the United Nations Conference on International Organization in 1945.

Turkey has been a non permanent member of the UN Security Council for 4 terms (a total of 7 years), with the most recent being the 2009–10 term.

Turkey is a charter member of the United Nations and participates in all of its specialised agencies and organizations. Turkey has contributed troops to United Nations peacekeeping efforts around the world, recently in the South Sudan conflict.

== Funding ==
The regular budget of the United Nations is financed through compulsory contributions from its member states. Turkey's contribution as percentage of the UN regular budget has increased the past decade. In 2012, the contribution was 0.617% of the UN regular budget. This number increased to 1.328% for the 2019–2021 term.

By increasing its contribution, Turkey gained membership of the Geneva Group in 2014. The Geneva Group consists of the largest budgetary contributors to the United Nations and focusses on the efficiency of the UN as well as its administrative and financial policies.

== Reform of the United Nations Security Council ==
Turkey is a strong advocate of a UNSC reform, in a joint campaign with Argentina, Canada, Italy, Mexico, Pakistan, South Korea and Spain.

UN Assembly President Volkan Bozkır urged member states to seek consensus and to “correct the problems of structure and functioning of the Council.” Turkey's main criticism is the UNSC's "lack of effectiveness". Turkish leader Recep Tayyip Erdoğan calls for the elimination of veto power for permanent members and suggests the requirement to reach unanimity in order to pass resolutions.

== Membership in the Security Council ==
Turkey has held a non-permanent seat in the United Nations Security Council four times since its entry in 1945. The last time was in 2009, in which Turkey gained provisional membership of the United Nations Security Council by receiving support from 151 states in the UN General Assembly.

- 1951–1952 (Middle Eastern Seat)
- 1954–1955 (Eastern European Seat)
- 1961 (Eastern European & Asian Seat)
- 2009–2010 (Western European and Others Group)

== Presidency of the General Assembly ==
The only time a Turkish citizen served as the President of the United Nations General Assembly was in 2020, during the seventy-fifth session.

- Volkan Bozkır, 2020

== Permanent Representatives ==
Turkey has a permanent mission to the UN, which is led by the Permanent Representative (UN Ambassador), currently Sedat Önal, who was appointed in February 2023.

== Regional group of Turkey ==
African Group Asia and the Pacific Group Eastern European Group Latin American and Caribbean Group Western European and Others Group

The United Nations has five geographical groups. Turkey participates in the works of both Western European and Others Group (WEOG) and the Asia-Pacific Group. However, as far as the elections are concerned, Turkey is considered to be a member of the WEOG Group.

== Peacekeeping missions ==
Turkey's official UN peacekeeping stance is mainly determined by two documents. The first is Article 92 of the Constitution, which states that, in response to a UN request for peacekeepers, the National Security Council will advise the government and that the President will send the proposal to Parliament, which will make the final decision on whether or not to send troops. As a result, the parliament debates the plan and determines the amount of troops to be deployed, as well as other rules governing Turkey's participation in the operation. Turkish police officers, on the other hand, are hired in UN and non-UN missions under Article 77 of Law No. 657.

The second document is the Concept on Turkey's Contribution to Peacekeeping and Peacebuilding Operations, which was released by Prime Minister Recep Tayyip Erdoğan on 15 March 2005. This document lays forth the principles that will influence Turkish peacekeeping choices. It necessitates that the peacekeeping mission in issue be given international legitimacy, which implies that UN Security Council must approve it. It also underlines that the government's missions in the Balkans, Central Asia, and the Middle East should be prioritized. Finally, mission goals must be clearly specified in order for the government to assess the costs and advantages of sending Turkish troops to the region.

Turkey has participated in the following peacekeeping missions led by the UN:

Country	Conflict	Mission	Date	No. of personnel
Afghanistan	War in Afghanistan	UNAMA	2002–2022	
Sudan	War in Darfur	UNAMID	2007–2020	40 police
Lebanon	Israeli invasion of Lebanon	UNIFIL	1978	286 troops
Kosovo	Kosovo War	UNMIK	1999	
Liberia	Second Liberian Civil War	UNMIL	2003–2018	
South Sudan	South Sudanese Civil War	UNMISS	2011	
Ivory Coast	First Ivorian Civil War	UNOCI	2004–2017	
Central African Republic	Central African Republic Civil War	MINUSCA	2014	
Mali	Northern Mali conflict	MINUSMA	2013	
Haiti	2004 Haitian coup d'état	MINUSTAH	2004–2017	
DR Congo	Kivu conflict	MONUSCO	2010	
