= Alvin Eicoff =

American advertising executive

Alvin Maurey Eicoff
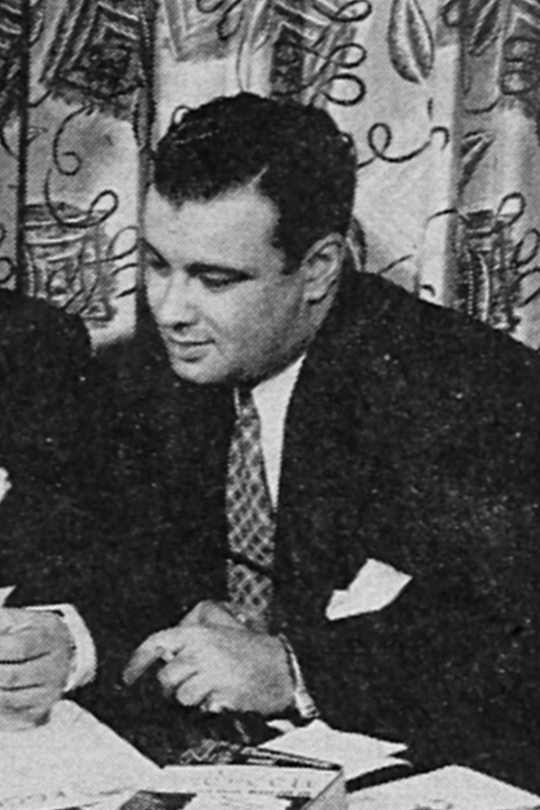
- Alvin Eicoff, Marfree vice president, cropped from a group photo
- Born: June 8, 1921
- Died: March 2, 2002 (age 80)
- Known for: Founder of direct response television (DRTV) advertising
- Spouse: Helene Topaz
- Children: 2

Alvin Maurey Eicoff (June 8, 1921 – March 2, 2002) was widely recognized as a founder of direct response television (DRTV) advertising. He helped pioneer the use of “1-800” numbers on television, along with the phrase “or your money back”. Alvin was a proponent of short-form DRTV, which consisted of 120-second and 60-seconds commercials featuring a 1-800 number and a call to action.

== Biography ==
Eicoff found his own advertising agency in 1959, A. Eicoff & Company, specializing in short-form DRTV. Due to his significant contributions and accomplishments in the direct response industry, he was elected to the Direct Marketing Association Hall of Fame and was elected as one of the 50 most influential people in television history by Advertising Age.

== Personal life ==
In 1947, Eicoff married Helene Topaz (1928–2020); they had two children Larry Eicoff and Jeffrey Eicoff. He died on March 2, 2002, and was buried at Shalom Memorial Park in Arlington Heights, Illinois.
