= Direct response television =

TV advertising that asks consumers to respond directly to the company

Direct response television (DRTV) is any television advertising that asks consumers to respond directly to the company — usually either by calling a toll-free telephone number, sending an SMS message, or by visiting a web site. This is a form of direct response marketing.

There are two types of direct response television, short-form, and long-form. Short-form is any DRTV commercial that is two minutes or less in length. Long-form direct response is any television commercial longer than two minutes. This was the accepted term for an infomercial from 1984 until "infomercial" came into vogue in 1988. The most common time period available for purchase as "long-form" infomercial media is 28 minutes, 30 seconds in length. Long-form is used for products that need to educate the consumer to create awareness and typically have a higher price. A relatively small amount or media time may be purchased in lengths less than 30 minutes but more than 2 minutes. Five minutes is the most commonly available time of these lengths.

Direct response television campaigns are commonly managed by specialist Direct Response or DRTV agencies with a full range of strategic, creative, production, media, and campaign services. They may also be managed by media buying agencies who specialize in direct response. In either case, these agencies purchase two types of air‑time in two ways. The first is to purchase off of a station or broadcast network's rate‑card for time. The second is to purchase remnant airtime, which is time that stations were not able to sell, and need to fill quickly or cheaply to avoid broadcasting dead-air. This is cheaper for agencies, but they have less control over when their commercials will run. As DRTV has gained presence outside of its start in the United States, local agencies have developed in many countries.

To qualify as DRTV, the advertising must ask the consumer to contact the advertiser directly by phone, by text message, or via the web. In the early days of DRTV, this was nearly always to purchase the product. Over time, a wide range of consumer actions have become used. And, many consumers watch the advertising but choose to purchase at retail without ever contacting the company. Typically for every unit sold on TV, anywhere from 3 to as high as 15 units might be sold at retail depending on retail distribution.

== DRTV as sales channel ==
When it first appeared, DRTV was used to market goods and services directly from the manufacturer or wholesaler to the consumer, bypassing retail. Over time, it has also become used as a more general advertising medium and is now used by a wide range of companies — often to support retail distribution. Non-profit organizations also benefit from DRTV by making a direct appeal to viewers to make a donation.

Many types of companies use DRTV. Marketing companies who specialize in DRTV continue to use the format to offer product exclusively sold through TV. Many of these items find their way to retail shelves once their television campaign has ended or has matured. For example, the Dirt Devil Broom Vac was only available on TV for three months before retail launch. Mass merchant retailers often have "as seen on TV" sections in their stores.

== DRTV as advertising for brand marketers and retailers ==
Starting in the 1990s, many brand manufacturers began to use DRTV as a part of their advertising mix. In these cases, most products featured on DRTV are also available at retail. The DRTV campaigns ask for direct consumer action either to purchase the product or to obtain a coupon which they can use at the retail store. Companies who have used DRTV for these purposes include DuPont (Teflon), Hamilton-Beach, Space Bag, Rubbermaid, P&G, Toyota, Philips Consumer Electronics, Bissell, Evinrude, and Sears (Craftsman brand).

DRTV has also become a commonly used advertising medium for insurance companies, mortgage companies, cell phone providers, credit card companies, and a host of other services. Companies using this approach include Blue Shield, AAA Insurance (CSAA), Bank of America, Citibank Credit Cards, DirecTV, Dish Network, and many more.

Lead generation has become a large segment of many DRTV campaigns. Typically these campaigns collect leads and close the sale at a later date via direct mail, email, or phone specialists. Other uses of DRTV include branding via hybrid campaigns, whereas you create awareness of the product and drive retail sales with no firm response goal. This is sometimes called Brand Response TV, (BRTV).

== Awards ==
Several award programs recognize excellence in DRTV advertising. Awards are sponsored by the Electronic Retailing Association (ERA) who honor both short-form and long-form DRTV advertising at their annual Moxie Awards Gala in conjunction with the ERA D2C Convention. Annually, the Jordan‑Whitney Greensheet offers a range of DRTV recognition awards. And even general advertising and production award shows, like the Telly's, WorldFest and Davey's, include categories for long-form TV Infomercial and DRTV work. For short-form television direct marketing, the DMA (Direct Marketing Association) recognizes program excellence via the A. Eicoff Broadcast Innovation Award, named for DRTV pioneer and DMA Hall of fame member, Alvin Eicoff.

== Super Bowl and direct response television ==
Many advertisements during the Super Bowl have been DRTV ads and encouraged direct response via websites and 800 numbers. These include ads for web services ranging from Cars.Com to Pets.com and Monster.com. The e-Trade advertisement shown during the 2008 Super Bowl featured both an 800 number and a website for response In 2000, Netpliance aired a 30-second advertisement driving phone calls to 1-800-iopener or Netpliance.com in Super Bowl XXXIV. Anticipating high response they obtained additional web hosting services in order to support direct response web traffic from the advertisement. During the 2009 Super Bowl XLIII, Cash 4 Gold ran a national advertisement during the Super Bowl. This was erroneously reported to be the first DRTV ad in Super Bowl history.
