= Ayşe Sinirlioğlu =

Turkish diplomat (born 1956)

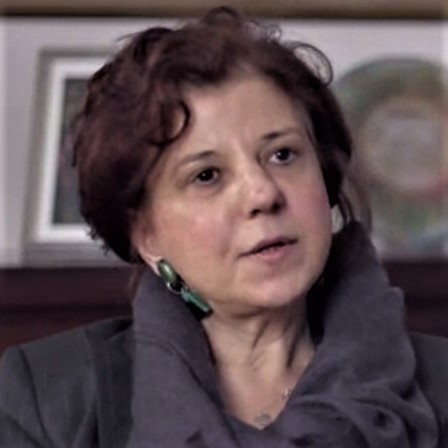
- in 2015

Turkish Ambassador to Spain
- In office 12 May 2011 – 1 August 2014
- President: Abdullah Gül
- Preceded by: Ender Arat
- Succeeded by: Ömer Önhon

Turkish Ambassador to Romania
- In office 20 April 2008 – 15 April 2011
- President: Abdullah Gül
- Preceded by: Ahmet Rıfat Ökçün
- Succeeded by: Ömür Şölendil

Personal details
- Born: April 4, 1956 (age 70) Nevşehir, Turkey
- Spouse: Feridun Sinirlioğlu
- Education: Economics
- Alma mater: Marmara University; University of Amsterdam; Boğaziçi University
- Profession: Diplomat

Ayşe Sinirlioğlu (born 4 April 1956) is a Turkish diplomat, who has been her country's ambassador to Romania and then to Spain and Andorra. She became Turkey's first woman deputy undersecretary in the Ministry of Foreign Affairs. In 2015 she was the Sherpa during Turkey's presidency and the Antalya summit of the G20 group of countries.

== Personal life ==
Ayşe Sinirlioğlu was born in Nevşehir, Turkey, on 4 April 1956. After earning a bachelor's degree from the Faculty of Economics and Administrative Science at Marmara University in 1977, she received a master's degree in European integration law from University of Amsterdam in 1988. In 1996, Sinirlioğlu was awarded a doctorate in political science from Boğaziçi University.

She is married to Feridun Sinirlioğlu, diplomat and former minister of Foreign Affairs of Turkey.

== Career ==
Sinirlioğlu entered the service of the Ministry of Foreign Affairs in 1984. After a brief service in the Department for Bilateral Economic Affairs, she was appointed vice consul to the General Consulate in Rotterdam, Netherlands, in 1985, where she served until 1988. Between 1988 and 1990, she was in Aleppo, Syria, as vice consul and then as consul. Before she was assigned to New York City, United States, as consul in 1992, she served in the Ministry's West European and OECD Countries Department and as first secretary to the prime minister. In 1996, she returned home to become head of the section head of the Department for Balkan Countries. Later, she was promoted to the head of Department for Central Asia and Caucasus. Between 1999 and 2002, Sinirlioğlu served as counselor and then as first counselor at Permanent Representation of Turkey to the UN Office in Geneva, Switzerland. From 2002 to 2004, she was first counselor in the Turkish Embassy in Amman, Jordan. After coming back to the ministry, she served as department head and then as deputy director general, minister-plenipotentiary in the Department for Bilateral Economic Affairs. On 20 April 2008, she was appointed ambassador to Romania serving in Bucharest until 15 April 2011. Her next service was as ambassador to Spain and Andorra from 12 May 2011 to 1 August 2014.

From September 2014 on, Sinirlioğlu acted as deputy undersecretary for economic affairs at the ministry and G20 Sherpa of Turkey. It was the first time in the bureaucracy history of Turkish diplomacy that a woman was appointed to the post of a deputy undersecretary. Her spouse Feridun Sinirlioğlu was undersecretary of the ministry at that time.
