= Kayıp Armağan =

- Directed by: Kerem S. Hünal
- Written by: Cemal Hünal
- Produced by: Cemal Hünal; Kerem S. Hünal; Mev Dinc
- Starring: Tuncel Kurtiz; Pelin Batu; Ali Poyrazoğlu
- Music by: Arif Selçuk Bor
- Production company: Sobee Studios
- Distributed by: FOX
- Release date: August 22, 2010
- Running time: 56 minutes
- Country: Turkey
- Languages: Turkish; Japanese

Kayıp Armağan (English: The Lost Gift) is a 2010 Turkish adult animated fantasy film directed by Kerem S. Hünal and written by Cemal Hünal. This film's storyline and the characters have been influenced by actual historical events, yet it consists of fictional characters, events and environments.

== Story ==
The Japanese Emperor Meiji wants Torajiro Yamada to bring a gift to the Ottoman Emperor Abdülhamid II. It is the symbol of the first diplomatic encounter between the two cultures. Torajiro Yamada's ship finally reaches the Aegean Sea after a long journey, but pirates attack the ship and steal the gift. Janissary Orhan and samurai Yamada start their bloody quest upon finding that on Ottoman soil.
