= Sedat Önal =

Turkish diplomat (born 1963)

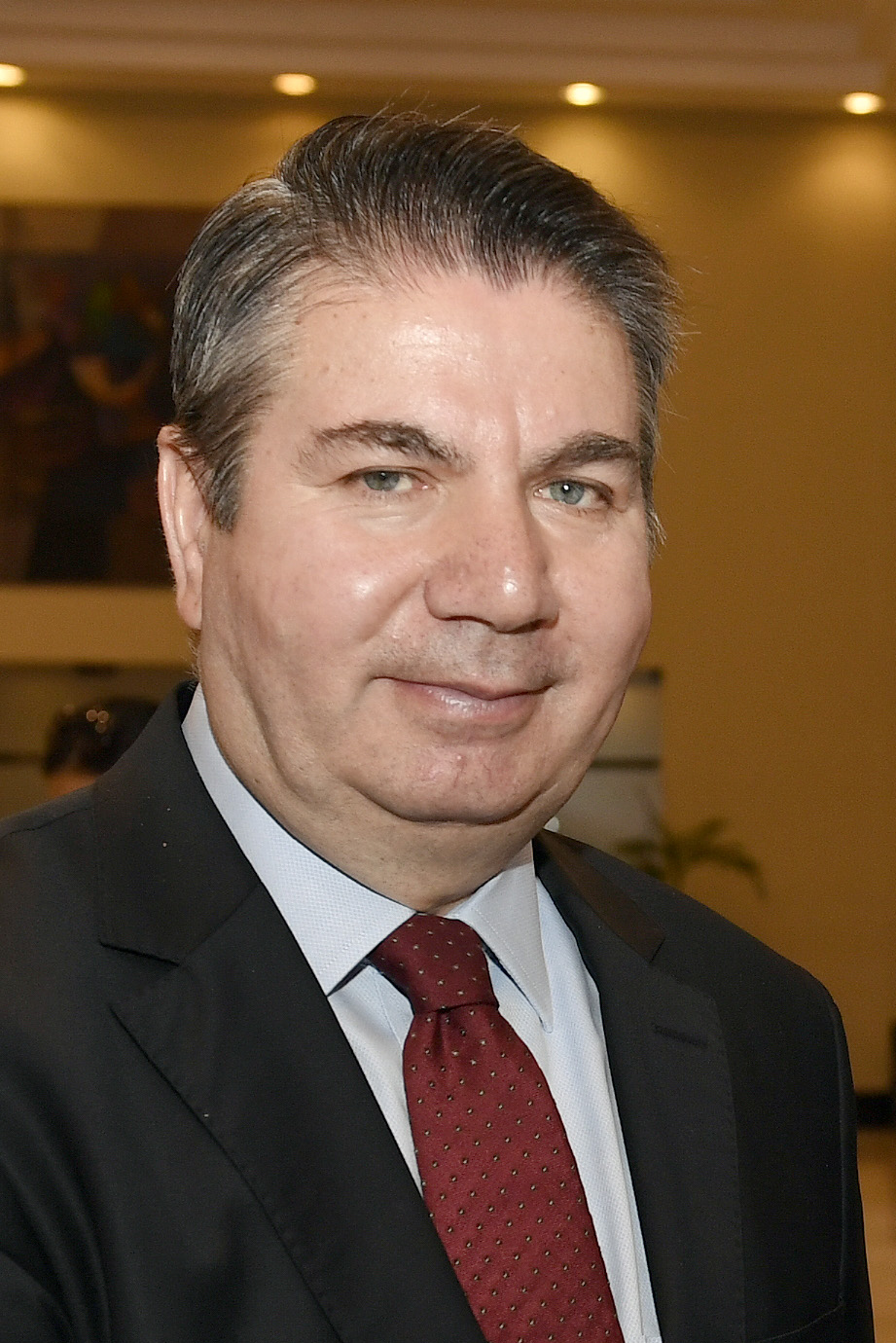

Ambassador of Turkey to the United States
- Incumbent
- Assumed office April 24, 2024
- President: Recep Tayyip Erdoğan
- Preceded by: Hasan Murat Mercan

Permanent Representative of Turkey to the United Nations
- In office February 21, 2023 – April 24, 2024
- President: Recep Tayyip Erdoğan
- Preceded by: Feridun Sinirlioğlu
- Succeeded by: Ahmet Yıldız

Ambassador of Turkey in Jordan
- In office July 18, 2012 – November 15, 2016
- President: Abdullah Gül
- Preceded by: Ali Köprülü
- Succeeded by: Murat Karagöz

Consul General of Turkey in Vienna
- In office July 1, 2007 – November 1, 2009
- President: Ahmet Necdet Sezer
- Preceded by: Position established
- Succeeded by: İbrahim Mete Yağlı

Personal details
- Born: August 11, 1963 (age 62) Kayseri, Turkey
- Education: Ankara University

Sedat Önal (born 11 August 1963, Kayseri) is the ambassador of Turkey to the United States since 24 April 2024. Önal was the Permanent Representative of Turkey to the United Nations between 21 February 2023 and 24 April 2024. Previously serving as the Deputy Minister of Foreign Affairs, he held various positions within the Turkish Ministry of Foreign Affairs.

== Education and career ==
Önal received his bachelor's degree in International Relations at the Faculty of Political Sciences, Ankara University. He began his career at the Ministry of Foreign Affairs in 1989 and has since served as Third Secretary at the Turkish Embassy in Kuwait, Vice Consul at the Turkish Consulate General in Münster and at the Turkish Consulate General in New York, and Counsellor at the Turkish Embassy in Tehran.

Between 2007 and 2009, Önal served as Consul General in Vienna and as Ambassador of Turkey in Jordan between 2012 and 2016. From 2009 to 2012, he served as Deputy Director General at the Middle East Department of the Ministry of Foreign Affairs of the Republic of Turkey.

Since 25 November 2016, Önal has been serving as the Deputy Undersecretary for the Middle East and Africa.
