= DRUM Agency =

Former marketing agency based in the USA

- Type: Private
- Industry: Advertising, Marketing
- Founded: 1981
- Headquarters: 3390 Peachtree Road 10th Floor, Atlanta, Georgia 30326, U.S.
- Number of locations: 3 centers of operations and 2 major satellite offices
- Area served: World Wide
- Key people: George Wiedemann (CEO); Kenneth Lomasney (COO)
- Services: Marketing; Advertising; Consulting; Media; SEO; SEM; ECRM; Analytics; Contact center telephony optimization
- Number of employees: 150+
- Website: drumagency.com

DRUM Agency was an independently owned marketing agency with operations in Atlanta, New York City and Chicago. It shut down without notice on April 15, 2020. It was the result of the merger of BKV (Bennett Kuhn Varner), unified.agency, Hiccup and Umarketing firms. The oldest agency, BKV, originally specialized in direct response marketing, then later expanded into traditional media, followed by digital media. Clients included both for-profit businesses and nonprofit organizations.

== History ==
=== BKV ===

BKV was founded in 1981 as Bennett Kuhn Varner, with Six Flags among its earliest clients. Initially specializing in direct-response marketing, the agency later expanded into traditional advertising and digital media.

In 1996, BKV developed a direct-response television campaign for Dirt Devil to introduce the Broom Vac three months before a retail launch. The campaign generated sales of approximately 100,000 units.

Early and mid-March 2001, BKV launched a series of direct response television commercials for Marietta's Matria Healthcare Inc. for their diabetes self-care division. The DRTV commercials target audience was seniors age 65 and over. They were to call a toll-free number to order diabetes-care supplies through the mail instead of through pharmacies.

June 2001, Direct Results Network was created as a sister company of BKV. In 2002, the name was changed to Response Mine Interactive (RMI).

In 2002, Ad Age named BKV one of the top agencies by U.S. direct marketing revenue at #49.

On Sept 2, 2005, BKV employees collected money on the streets of Buckhead for victims of Hurricane Katrina. Agency owners Brent Kuhn and Maribett Varner matched the donation raised and BKV sent $3,218 to the American Red Cross.

In 2006, BKV began using marketing techniques to better reach clients and consumers by using video and audio Podcasts and mobile platforms.

In 2007, Equifax chose BKV to handle its $11 million account for direct response, search engine optimization and marketing services. To expand communication programs beyond the internet, Equifax chose to utilize print, direct mail and direct response television.

BKV merged with Weyforth-Haas Marketing of Overland Park, Kansas in 2007, with the combined company adopting the name BKV Inc. in 2008.

BKV and sister company RMI moved to 8th, 9th and 10th floors of Lenox Towers at 3390 Peachtree Road, Atlanta, Georgia, 30326 in June 2009 with the help of CresaPartners. BKV was previously located at 2964 Peachtree Road for ten years.

Between 2013 and 2015, BVK executives and marketing specialists participated in industry conferences and events, including Digital Summit Atlanta, SES Atlanta, and SEMPO discussions, covering topics such as digital marketing, search engine optimization, analytics, display advertising, web design, and web development.

In October 2015, BKV provided nonprofit marketing services to support 48in48 as both a sponsor and source of volunteers including web designers, developers and copywriters. This event, which took place at General Assembly in Ponce City Market, provided 48 custom WordPress websites for 48 Atlanta-based nonprofits in no more than 48 hours.

=== DRUM Agency ===
In 2016 BKV began collaborating with three other agencies, Hiccup, Umarketing and unified.agency as a planned two-year consolidation. Then in 2018, these agencies merged into one marketing firm under the name DRUM Agency, led by CEO George Wiedemann and COO Ken Lomasney with operations in Atlanta, Chicago and New York. In April 2020, DRUM Agency shut its Atlanta office down suddenly and without explanation.

== Services ==
Offerings under BKV included digital advertising, search engine marketing, advanced data and analytics, direct mail, customer relationship management, email marketing, broadcast creative and media services, search engine optimization, social media marketing and digital PR. The company also provided web and mobile development services, such as design, static site generation, API integration, and database administration. With the merger to DRUM Agency, additional creative, technology and analytics services were added to the offering.

== Awards ==
In 2003, BKV received a Bronze Echo Award from the Direct Marketing Association for its 3-D mailer campaign for World Releif.
