= Pelin Batu =

Turkish actress (born 1978)

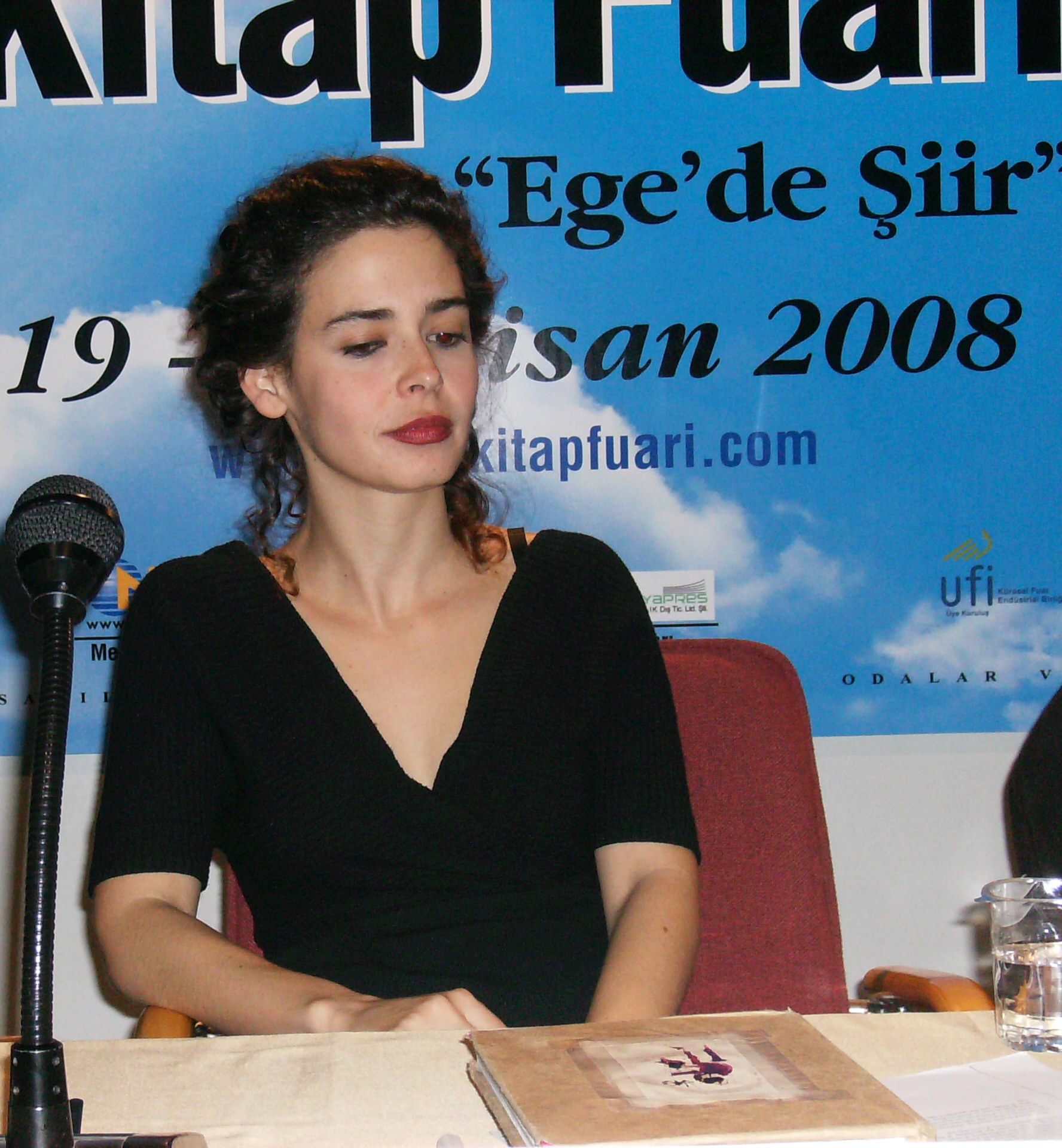
- Batu in 2008
- Born: 27 December 1978 (age 47); Ankara, Turkey
- Education: Boğaziçi University
- Occupations: Author, actress, historian, television personality
- Years active: 1999–present

Pelin Batu (born 27 December 1978) is a Turkish author, actress, historian, and television personality.

== Biography ==
Pelin Batu is born on the 27th of December 1978 to İnal Batu and an Albanian mother. Due to her father İnal Batu's career as a diplomat, she spent her childhood in many foreign countries including Pakistan, Cyprus, Czech Republic, France and the USA. She completed high school at Marymount School in New York City and pursued musical and theatre training at Mannes College of Music. After starting literature and philosophy at New York University, she switched her subject to history and completed it at Boğaziçi University in Istanbul. She made her film debut in 1999, portraying the role of Circassian Nevres in Harem Suare and has gone on to act with several more films and TV series.

Batu also co-hosted a show titled Tarihin Arka Odası (The Back Room of History) which aired on HaberTürk with Murat Bardakçı and Erhan Afyoncu. Interested in poetry from a young age, she has written, translated, and published many poems. Her first book of poetry "Glass" was published in 2003, followed by "The Book of Winds" in 2009. She left the program in 2011.

She has also appeared on the Turkish TV program Yeni Şeyler Söylemek Lazım, a part of the TRT Haber news channel on 25 December 2010, in which she read her poem of "Wind of Black Stones" herself from her book. Having written poems from the age of eight, on this program she said that even though she is an atheist, if reincarnation existed she would be the reincarnation of the grandfather, Selahattin Batu, as he was also known for his interest in poetry and whom she is commonly compared to.

Batu was also a columnist for the daily Milliyet newspaper (2012–2014).

== Filmography ==
Cinema and TV films
| Year | Title | Role | Notes |
|---|---|---|---|
| 1999 | Harem Suare | Çerkes Cariye Nevres | |
| 1999 | Hayal Kurma Oyunları | Zeynep | |
| 2001 | Komser Şekspir | Su | |
| 2001 | Şellale | Nihal | |
| 2002 | O Şimdi Asker | Müzeyyen | |
| 2002 | İçerideki | Kizar | Short film |
| 2003 | Bakış | | Short film |
| 2006 | Karanlıkta Makyaj | | Voice |
| 2006 | Pars: Kiraz Operasyonu | Teacher | |
| 2007 | Bayrampaşa: Ben Fazla Kalmayacağım | | Guest appearance |
| 2007 | Hicran Sokağı | Müyesser | |
| 2008 | Yağmurdan Sonra | Sumru | |
| 2009 | Kanımdaki Barut | Foreign woman | |
| 2009 | Kayıp Armağan | Yasemin | Voice |
| 2010 | Mandalina Kabukları | | Short film |
| 2012 | Zor Yılların Kayıp Çocukları | Züleyha | |
| 2014 | Şipşak Anadolu | | Guest appearance |
| 2014 | Bir Don Juan Öldürmek | | |
TV series
| Year | Title | Role | Notes |
| 1999 | Akşam Güneşi | Jülide | |
| 2003 | Baba | Deniz | |
| 2004 | Ayışığı Neredesin | | |
| 2005 | Sessiz Gece | Çiçek | |
| 2006 | Dün Gece Bir Rüya Gördüm | Lale | |
TV Programs
| Year | Title | Role | Notes |
| 2009–2011 | Tarihin Arka Odası | Herself | |
| 2011 | Burada Laf Çok | Herself | |

== Bibliography ==
- Glass / Cam, 113pp, 2003, Yapı Kredi, ISBN 9750806549
- Yahudilik Tarihi, 304pp, 2007, Yapı Kredi, ISBN 9789944174176
- The Book of Winds Rüzgarlar Kitabı, 224pp, 2009, Artshop, ISBN 9789894893653
- Resim Defteri, 48pp, 2013, Artshop, ISBN 9786055102036
- Her Şey Bir Hikaye İle Başladı, 2018, İnkılâp Kitabevi, ISBN 9789751039002
- Labirentin, 2018, İnkılâp Kitabevi, ISBN 9789751038975
