= İnal Batu =

Turkish diplomat and politician

Personal details
- Born: 24 September 1936 Ankara, Turkey
- Died: 5 August 2013 (aged 76) Istanbul, Turkey
- Resting place: Zincirlikuyu Cemetery
- Party: Republican People's Party (CHP)
- Spouse: Nevra Batu
- Children: Pelin Batu (daughter), Arda Batu (son)
- Education: Faculty of Political Science, Ankara University
- Profession: Diplomat, politician

İnal Batu (24 September 1936 – 5 August 2013) was a Turkish diplomat, politician and member of the Grand National Assembly of Turkey.

== Biography ==
He was born on 24 September 1936 in Ankara as the son of Selahattin Batu (1905–1973), a zoologist and politician. He studied Diplomacy and Foreign Relations at the Faculty of Political Science, Ankara University, graduating in 1960.

İnal Batu served at various Turkish diplomatic missions including Lefkoşa, Prague, Mexico City, Islamabad and as Turkish Ambassador to Italy in Rome. He was also the Permanent Representative of Turkey to the United Nations from 1993 to 1995. Batu played an important role in the resolution of the Imia/Kardak crisis, which broke out in late 1995 between Greece and Turkey. He proposed that Turkey landed on the west islet, which later took place. His proposal aimed at a peaceful return to status quo ante, by achieving the military situation in which islets would have military presence of both armies, one on each.

Following the 2002 general election, he entered the parliament as a deputy of Hatay Province from the Republican People's Party, serving until 2007.

He was member of the board of Fenerbahçe SK and served also as its vice president.

Batu died from heart failure, aged 76, on 5 August 2013 at a hospital in Istanbul, where he had been treated for two months. Following the religious funeral service at the Teşvikiye Mosque, he was buried at the Zincirlikuyu Cemetery. He was survived by his wife Nevra, daughter Pelin Batu, a film and television actress and son Arda Batu, an academic.
