= Turkish House =

Skyscraper in Manhattan, New York

- Türkevi
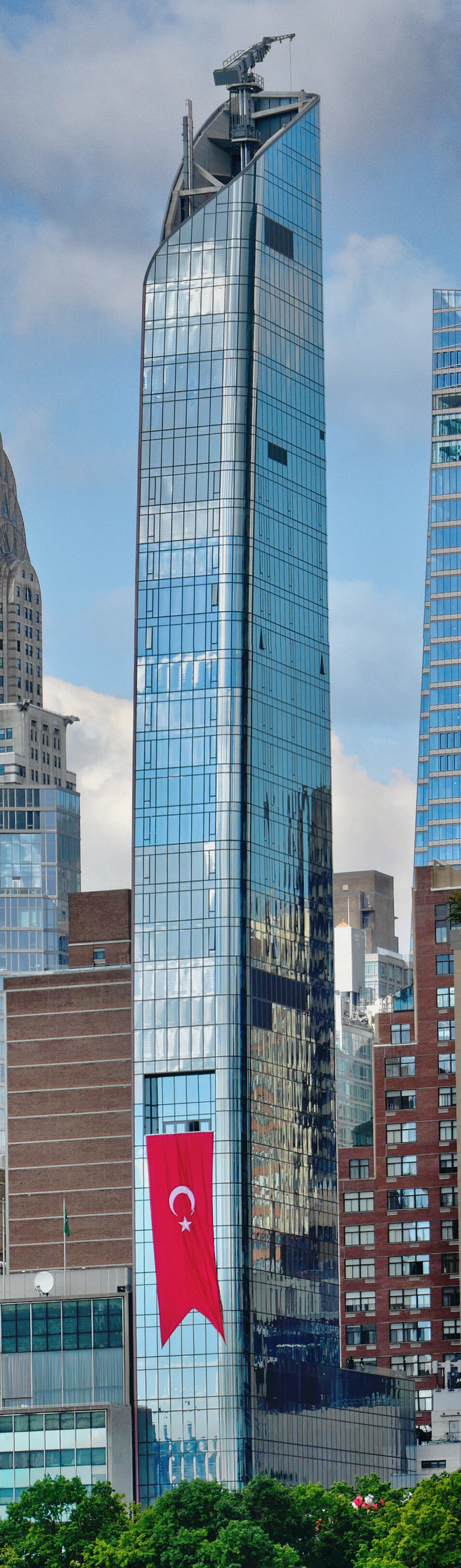
- Interactive map of the Turkish House area

General information
- Status: Completed
- Type: Retail, office, and residential
- Location: 821 United Nations Plaza; New York City, NY; United States
- Coordinates: 40.751370°N 73.968380°W
- Current tenants: UN Permanent Mission of Turkey; Consulate General of Turkey in New York
- Construction started: September 18, 2017
- Inaugurated: September 20, 2021
- Cost: 291 million USD
- Owner: Republic of Turkey

Technical details
- Floor count: 36

Design and construction
- Architecture firm: Perkins Eastman

The Turkish House (also called Turkevi Center) is a 561-foot-high (171 m), 36-floor skyscraper located at 821 United Nations Plaza (First Avenue) in Turtle Bay, Manhattan, New York City, United States, across from the headquarters of the United Nations. Turkish House serves as the headquarters of multiple Turkish diplomatic missions in New York City, as well as a center of Turkish cultural activity.

== Description ==
Turkish House, designed by Perkins Eastman, is 35 stories tall and measures 561 feet (171 m) from the ground to the roof. The building contains about 220,000 square feet (20,000 m^{2}) of usable space, of which 180,000 square feet (17,000 m^{2}) is used by the Permanent Mission of Turkey to the United Nations and the Consulate General of Turkey in New York City; the rest is residential space. The curved facade is an allusion to the crescent on the flag of Turkey, while the top of the skyscraper is shaped like a tulip, the national flower of Turkey.

The first 36 floors contain 102,000 square feet (9,500 m^{2}) of commercial space. The tower has an auditorium and office floors for the UN mission as well as the consulate. Outdoor terraces are located on the 5th, 11th, and 16th floors. The building also has a prayer room, meeting rooms, and exhibition space. Beginning on the 20th floor are apartments, some of which are used by Turkish diplomatic missions. The total residential space is 40,000 square feet (3,700 m^{2}), with each unit averaging about 2,045 square feet (190.0 m^{2}). Two duplex apartments were planned. A fitness center, shared terrace space, and a parking garage are available for residents.

== History ==
The government of Turkey hired Cresa Partners in 2012 to demolish two existing buildings in the Turtle Bay neighborhood of Manhattan in New York City, facing the headquarters of the United Nations, and to construct a new building housing a Turkish consulate on the site. The Turkish government filed plans for the tower with the New York City Department of Buildings in March 2016. After Cresa announced in September 2016 that it would no longer work on the Turkish consulate, the Turkish government sued Cresa that November.

Construction commenced in September 2017. The building was largely completed by May 2021. New York City building inspectors issued a violation to the building in mid-2021 after a glass panel fell ten stories from the facade, and just before the building's official opening, building inspectors reported that there were numerous major problems with key mechanical systems such as sprinklers and fans. Turkish President Recep Tayyip Erdoğan formally opened the center on September 20, 2021. The structure had cost US$291 million. At the time of the building's completion, it was the most expensive Turkish diplomatic building ever built, and Turkish citizens criticized the cost as extravagant. In addition, the building's fire-safety system was not complete for 18 months after the building opened.

Multiple windows of the building were broken by Recep Akbıyık on May 22, 2023. The attack on the building was condemned by U.S. State Department spokesperson Matthew Miller. Akbıyık was arrested by the New York Police Department in May.

=== FBI investigation into Eric Adams's 2021 mayoral campaign ===
In 2023, the FBI and United States Attorney for the Southern District of New York began an investigation into whether New York City mayor Eric Adams had improperly persuaded New York City Fire Department (FDNY) officials to allow occupancy of the building despite alleged problems with safety there. News media reported that Adams had threatened to fire FDNY officials in August 2021 if they did not approve the building's fire-safety system. In 2024, Adams was indicted on federal criminal charges, including allegations that Turkish nationals indirectly bribed Adams to assist with issues related to the Turkish House. In February 2025, the United States Department of Justice department instructed federal prosecutors to drop all charges against Adams.

== See also ==
- Diyanet Center of America
