= Faculty of Political Science, Ankara University =

- Ankara Üniversitesi Siyasal Bilgiler Fakültesi
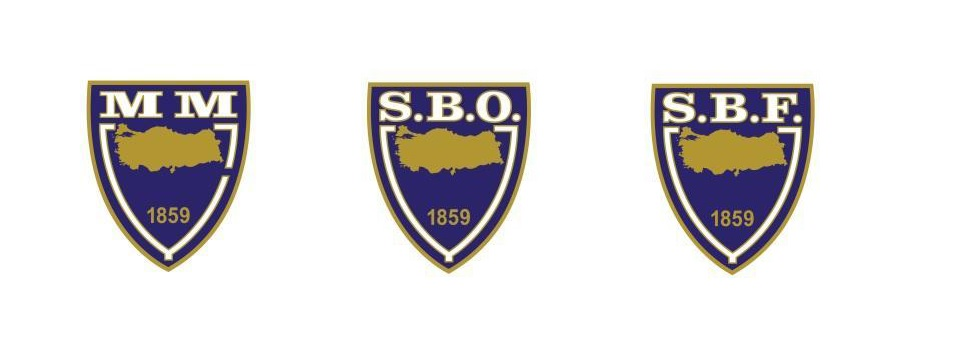
- Other name: Mülkiye Mektebi
- Former names: Mekteb-i Mülkiye-i Şahane (English: The Imperial School of Civil Service)
- Motto: Turkish: Türkiye için Mülkiye
- Motto in English: Mülkiye for Türkiye
- Type: Public
- Established: December 12, 1859; 166 years ago
- Founder: Abdülmecid I
- Parent institution: Ankara University
- Dean: Prof. Dr. Orhan Çelik
- Location: Ankara, Turkey
- Campus: Urban
- Language: Turkish, English
- Publication: Journal of Political Science
- Alumni name: Mülkiyeli
- Colours: Navy blue White
- Nickname: Mülkiyespor
- Mascot: Cow
- Website: politics.ankara.edu.tr

The Faculty of Political Science of the University of Ankara (Turkish: Ankara Üniversitesi Siyasal Bilgiler Fakültesi, more simply known as "SBF") is the oldest institution of administrative sciences in Turkey. It is the successor of the "Mekteb-i Mülkiye" (Ottoman Turkish: مَكْتَبِ مُلْكِيَه), also known simply as "Mülkiye," which was originally established in Istanbul on February 12, 1859, during the reign of Sultan Abdülmecid I. In 1936, the institution was relocated to Ankara and later incorporated into Ankara University on April 3, 1950, under its current name.

The faculty offers higher education in Social Science, Public Finance, Economics, Public Administration, Labor Economics, Business Administration, and International Relations. It is regarded as one of the most influential academic institutions in shaping Turkey's political and administrative landscape.

== History ==
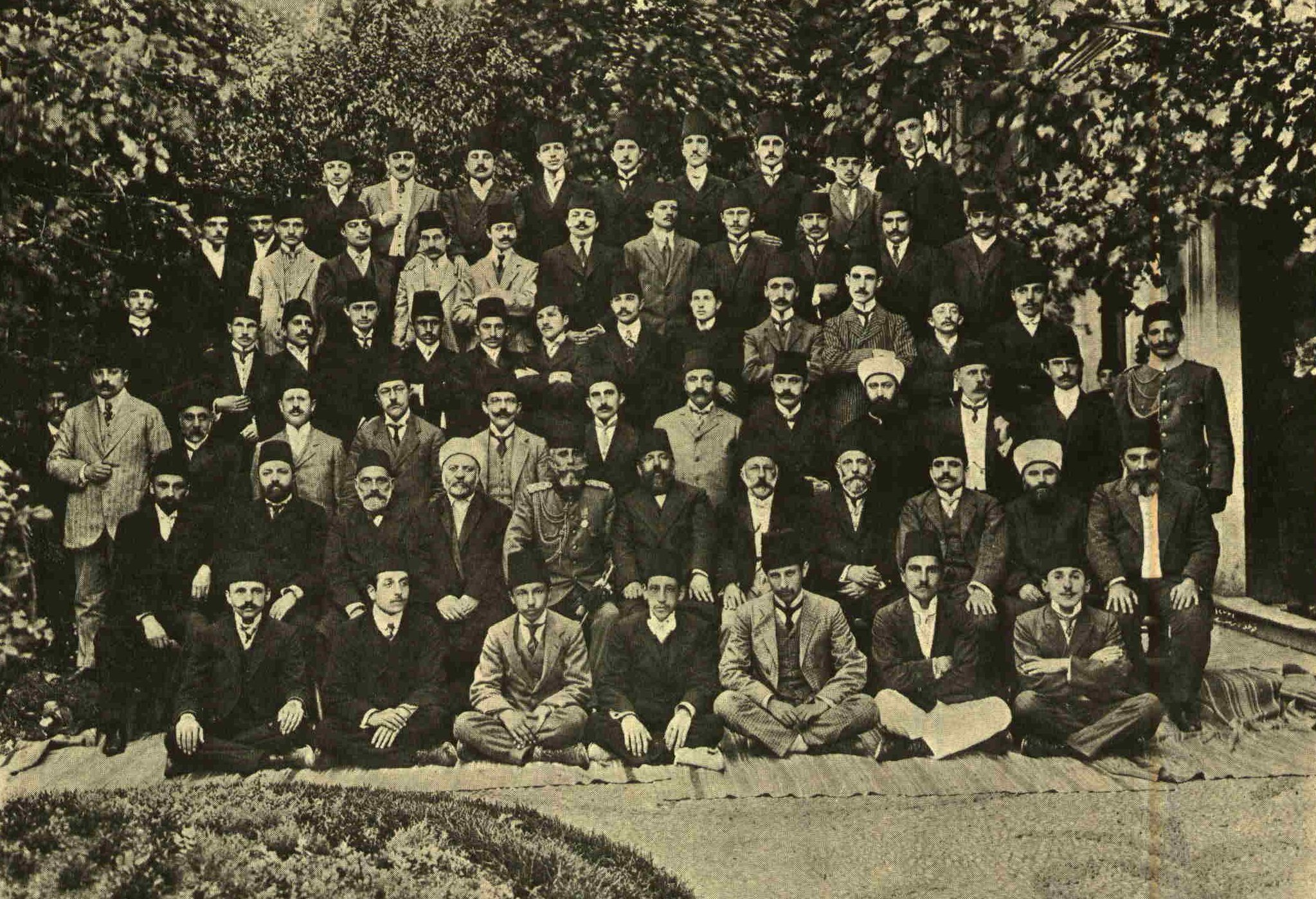
Mülkiye Alumni, Class of 1910, featured in the July 8, 1910 issue of Servet-i Fünun

The Faculty of Political Science at Ankara University was originally established in Istanbul in 1859 as an autonomous college by Sultan Abdülaziz. Initially named Mekteb-i Mülkiye-i Şahane (Ottoman Turkish: مَكْتَبِ مُلْكِيَه شاهانە, lit. The Imperial School of Civil Service), it operated under the Ministry of Internal Affairs. In 1918, the school was renamed Mekteb-i Mülkiye and placed under the Ministry of Education. Following the establishment of the Republic of Turkey, at the request of Mustafa Kemal Atatürk, the school was relocated to Ankara and renamed the School of Political Science, with the duration of study extended to four years. On March 23, 1950, the school was incorporated into Ankara University as the Faculty of Political Science.

The faculty has historically been recognized as a bastion of freedom of expression and organization, providing a platform for individuals with diverse political views to express themselves in a democratic environment. This distinctive quality has set it apart from other universities in Turkey.

Master's and doctorate programs were introduced in the 1955–56 academic year. In 1982, the faculty underwent structural changes, expanding to include six specialized departments: International Relations, Political Science and Public Administration, Economics, Public Finance, Business Administration, and Labor Economics and Industrial Relations.

== Academics ==
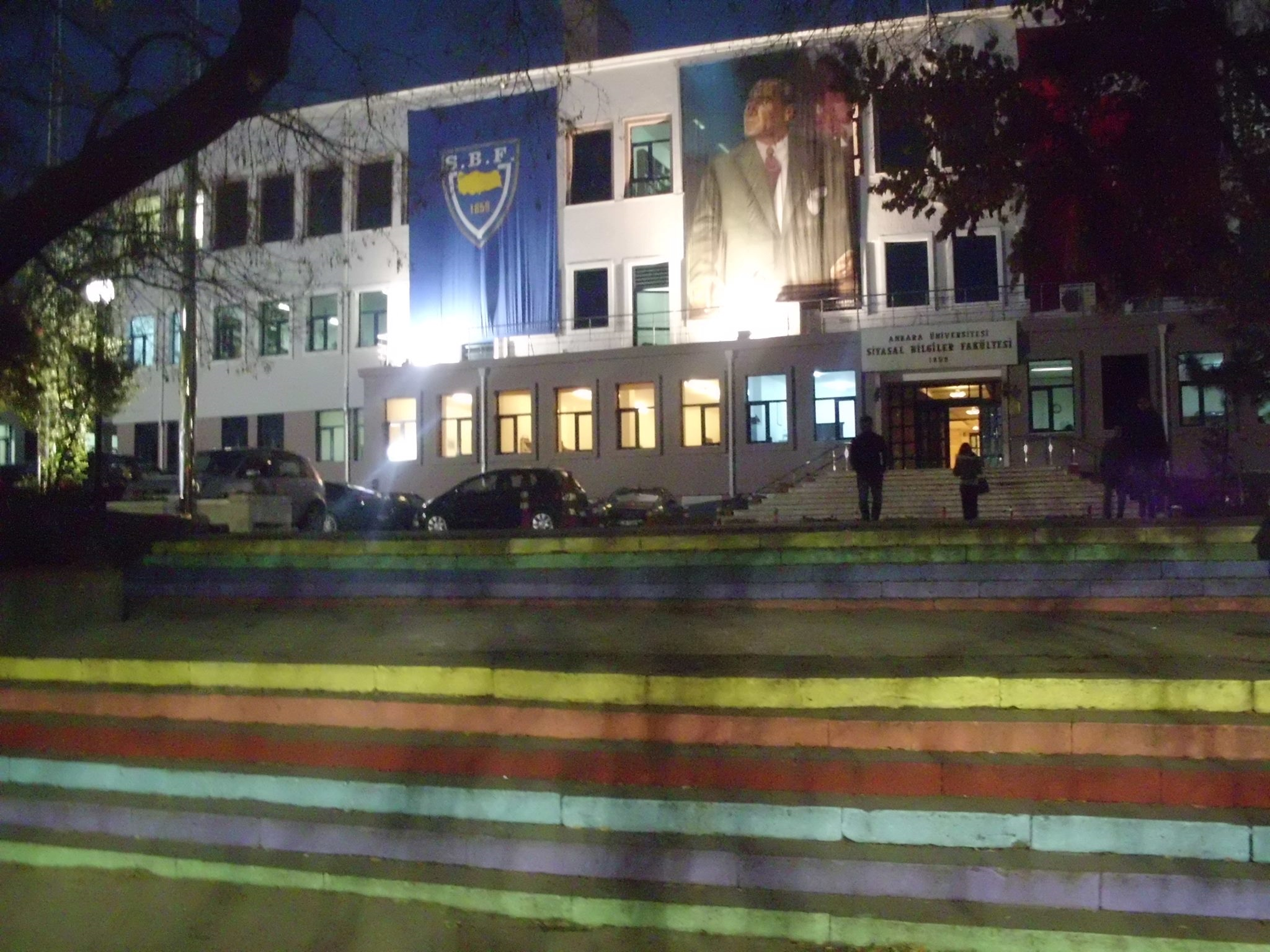
A view of Mekteb-i Mülkiye at night

The Faculty of Political Science at Ankara University currently employs 172 academic staff, comprising 42 professors, 33 associate professors, 34 assistant professors, 18 research assistants with doctorates, 35 research assistants pursuing doctorate degrees, four lecturers, and six experts. Additionally, the faculty is supported by 78 administrative staff.

Alumni of the faculty, known as Mülkiyeliler, have a strong presence in various sectors. Many alumni hold prominent positions in the Ministry of Foreign Affairs, Internal Affairs, and Public Finance, as well as in public institutions, banks, and private companies. A number of them have also served as prime ministers, ministers, deputies, ambassadors, and governors.

The faculty's alumni association, Mülkiyeliler Birliği (English: Association of Mülkiye Alumni), is a non-governmental organization with branches across Turkey. It organizes courses, seminars, symposiums, and exhibitions and is actively involved in publishing magazines and books.

The Faculty of Political Science at Ankara University provides a range of teaching facilities to accommodate the needs of its courses and departments. These include two amphitheaters, a 450-seat conference hall, large classrooms, seminar rooms, multipurpose rooms, and computer centers.

English language preparation classes have been mandatory for all departments since the 2008–2009 academic year, and additional foreign language courses are offered. Since the 1992–1993 academic year, elective language courses focusing on departmental terminology have been available.

The faculty's library specializes in social sciences and holds a collection of 108,000 Turkish and foreign language books. It also includes 46,000 domestic and international periodicals, as well as newspaper collections of historical significance. The library features a 300-seat reading room, the Hande Mumcu Reading Room for periodicals, and the Ali Cankaya Room, which houses archival materials.

The Faculty of Political Science has been publishing the Journal of Political Science (Turkish: SBF Dergisi) quarterly since 1943.

== Student life ==
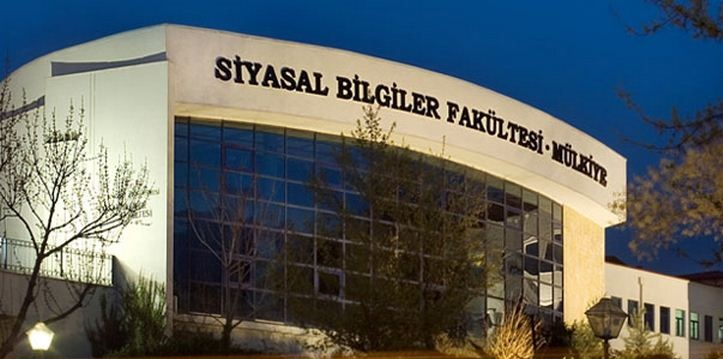
A view of the entrance of the Faculty of Political Science, Ankara University

The Faculty of Political Science features a canteen, Coffee Mülkiye, two tea centers, and a dining hall that provides services to faculty, academic, and administrative staff.

While Ankara University hosts several student dormitories, their capacity is insufficient to accommodate all students. To address this, various private and state-run dormitories in Ankara offer additional housing options.

The faculty provides a range of social and sporting activities, including theater, cinema, art, music, and dance ensembles, as well as more than 30 communities of thought. The faculty's basketball team, Mülkiyespor, supported by its alumni, competes in the secondary league.

One of the most notable traditions at the Faculty of Political Science is the Cow Festival (Turkish: İnek Bayramı), a vibrant event held annually since the 1930s, just before final exams. The festival's name is derived from the Turkish slang word "inek" meaning "nerd," and features a playful tradition where the top student of a class parades through the streets on a cow.

The event is organized by the Festival Organization Committee (Feskom), comprising third- and fourth-year students. Faculty members, students, and alumni participate in the festival's opening ceremony, during which a humorous prayer for the year is read collectively. As part of this tradition, a "reading cow sculpture" was erected in front of the faculty in 2000 by that year's Festival Organization Committee.

== Mülkiye March ==
The Mülkiye March was composed by Musa Süreyya, with lyrics written by Cemal Edhem (Yeşil), both alumni of the Class of 1921. The opening lines of the march are translated as: "We do not want another love, because it is your love in our hearts; stop weeping, beloved country, because we have arrived."

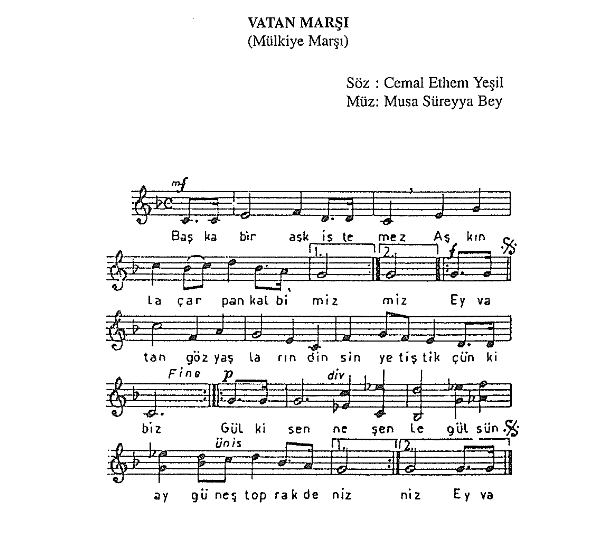
Sheet music of the Mülkiye March

Mülkiye March by Musa Süreyya (Class of 1921)

Başka bir aşk istemez, aşkınla çarpar kalbimiz,
Ey Vatan gözyaşların dinsin, yetiştik çünkü biz.
Gül ki sen, neş'enle gülsün ay, güneş, toprak, deniz.
Ey Vatan gözyaşların dinsin, yetiştik çünkü biz.

Bir güneştin bir zamanlar, aya kadar kaldındı dün,
Dün bir ay'dın, sislenen boşlukta yıldızsın bu gün;
Benzin uçmuş bak, ne rüya'dır, bu akşam gördügün?
Ey Vatan gözyaşlarin dinsin, yetiştik çünkü biz.

Beklesin Türkoğlu'nun azminde kuvvet bulmayan,
Sel durur, yangın söner elbette bir gün Ey Vatan
Süslenir, oynar yarin, dün ağlayıp matem tutan
Ey Vatan gözyaşlarin dinsin, yetiştik çünkü biz.

— Lyrics of the Mülkiye March

== Notable alumni ==
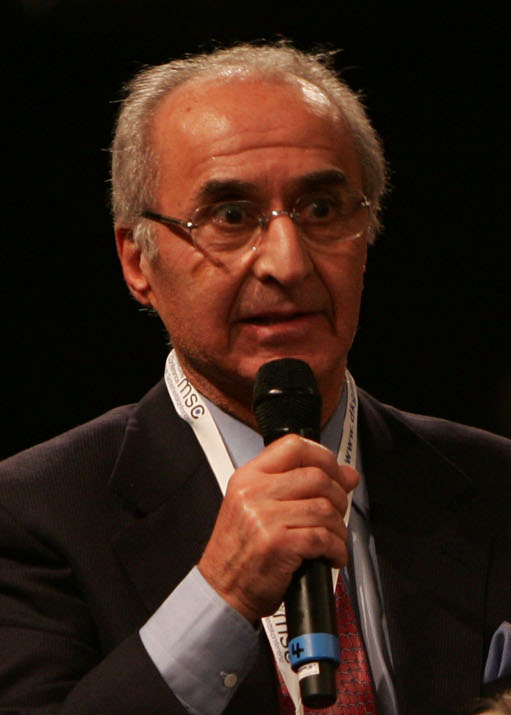
Hikmet Çetin, Former Turkish Foreign Affairs Minister and first NATO Senior Civilian Representative in Afghanistan

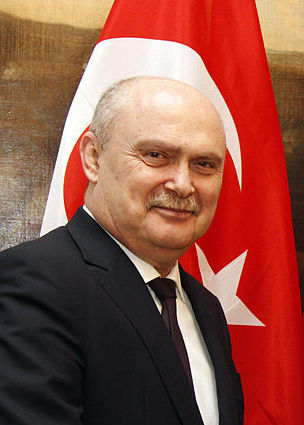
Feridun Sinirlioğlu, Secretary-general of the Organization for Security and Co-operation in Europe

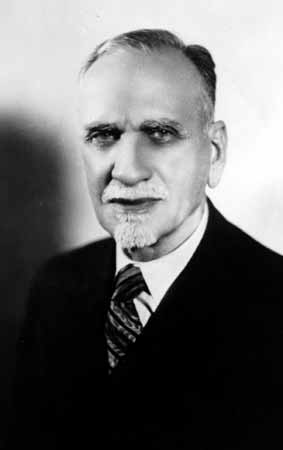
Hashim al-Atassi, 4th President of Syria

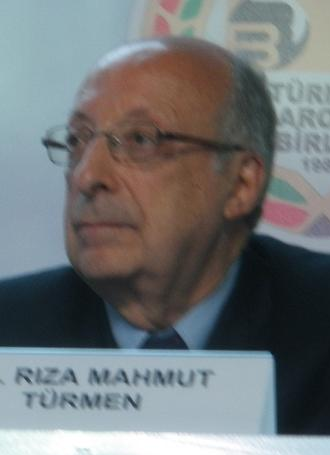
Rıza Türmen, Former judge of the European Court of Human Rights

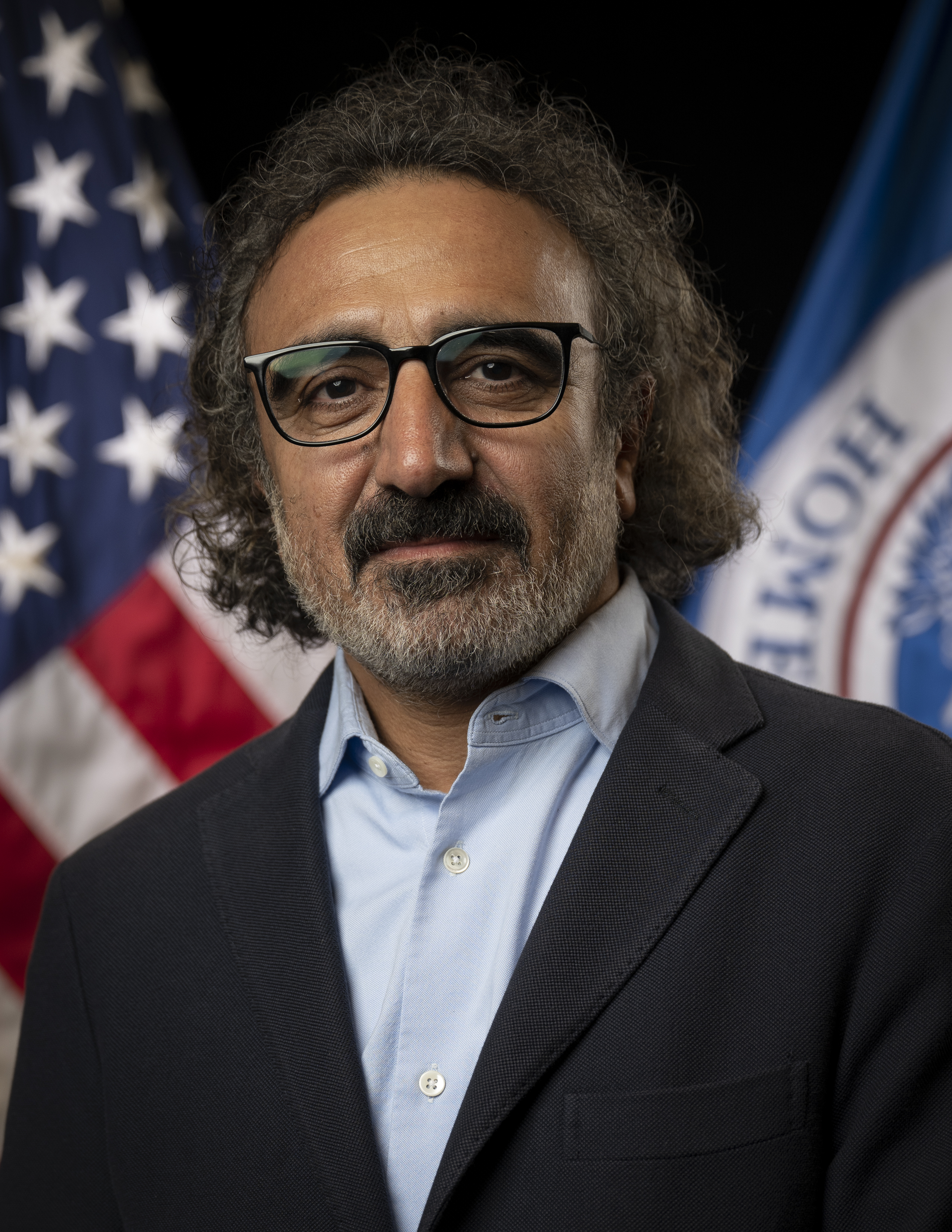
Hamdi Ulukaya, Founder of Chobani

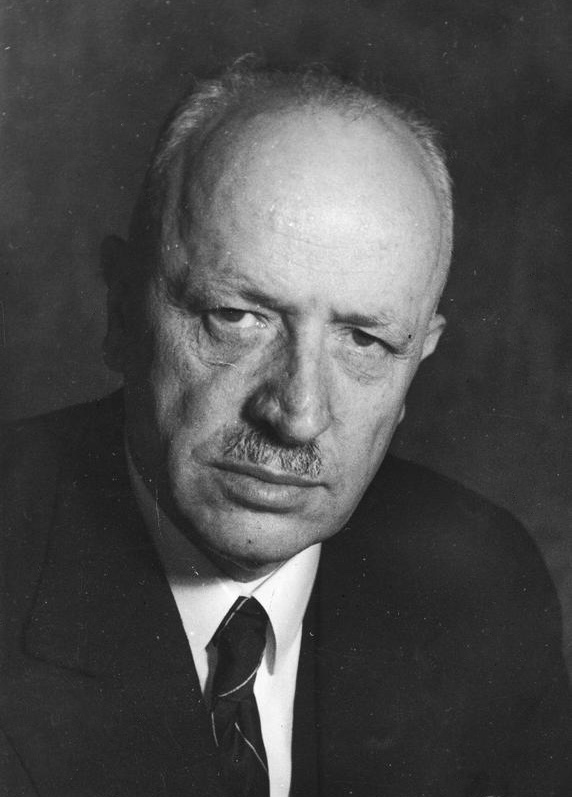
Rauf Fico, Former Albanian Minister of Foreign Affairs

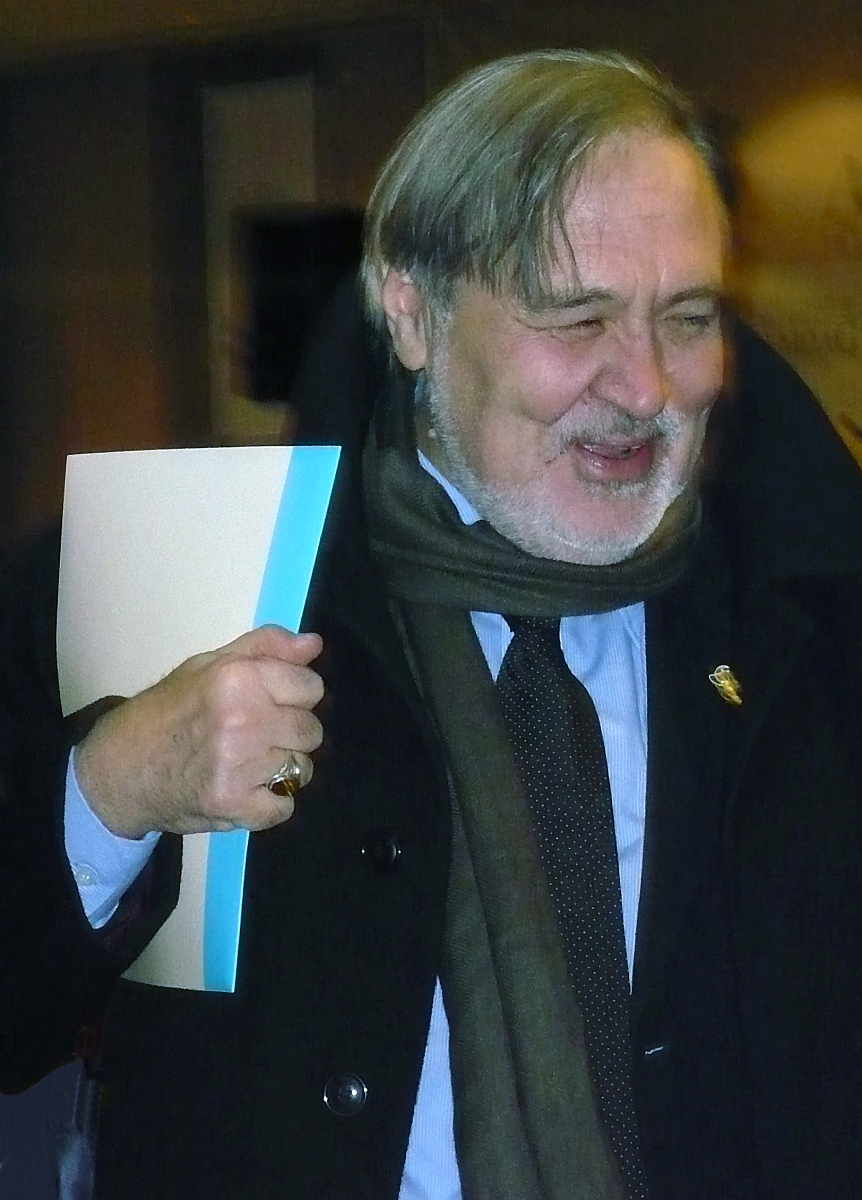
İlber Ortaylı, Turkish historian
- Hashim al-Atassi (1875-1960) — Statesman and President of Syria from 1936 to 1939, 1949 to 1951, and 1954 to 1955.
- Abdülkadir Aksu (born 1944) — Politician
- Mehmet Ağar (born 1951) — Police chief, politician, government minister and leader of the Democratic Party (DP)
- Rıdvan Akar (born 1961) — Journalist and author
- Ekrem Alican (1916-2000) — Politician, government minister and leader of the New Turkey Party (YTP)
- Ertuğrul Apakan (born 1947) — Diplomat
- Sadun Aren (1922–2008) — Academic and politician
- İnal Batu (1936-2013) — Diplomat and politician
- Hikmet Bilâ (1954-2011) — Journalist and columnist
- Necdet Calp (1922-1998) — Civil servant and politician
- Nurettin Canikli (born 1960) — Deputy Prime Minister of Turkey
- Hasan Cemal (born 1944) — Journalist, former editor-in-chief of Cumhuriyet
- Mustafa Cengiz (1949–2021) — Turkish businessman, former president of Galatasaray S.K.
- Cengiz Çandar (born 1948) — Journalist and former war correspondent
- Mevlüt Çavuşoğlu (born 1968) — Politician and Minister of Foreign Affairs of Turkey since 24 November 2015
- Hikmet Çetin (born 1937) — Politician, former Minister of Foreign Affairs, first NATO Senior Civilian Representative in Afghanistan and former leader of the Republican People's Party (CHP)
- Sulejman Delvina (1884-1932) — Albanian politician
- Nexhip Draga (1867-1920) — Albanian politician
- Shukri al-Quwatli (1891-1967) — First President of Syria from 1943 to 1949, from 1955 to 22 February 1958
- Abdullah Öcalan (born 1946) — Kurdistan Workers' Party leader and political thinker
- Halil Ergün (born 1946) — Actor
- Rauf Fico (born 1881) — Albanian politician and diplomat
- Mesut Yılmaz (born 1947) — Politician and former Prime Minister
- Vecdi Gönül (born 1939) — Politician and former Minister of National Defence of Turkey
- Şükrü Sina Gürel (born 1950) — Diplomat, politician and former Minister of Foreign Affairs
- Aydın Güven Gürkan (1941-2006) — Academic, politician, former Minister of Labor and Social Security, and leader of the People's Party (HP) and Social Democratic Populist Party (SHP)
- Hasan Celal Güzel (born 1946) — Politician and journalist
- Necip Hablemitoğlu (1954-2002) — Historian and intellectual
- Vahit Melih Halefoğlu (born 1919) — Diplomat, politician and former Minister of Foreign Affairs
- Mustafa Kamalak (born 1948) — Politician and leader of the Felicity Party (SP)
- Cezmi Kartay (1920-2000) — Civil servant, politician and leader of the Social Democracy Party (SODEP)
- Ahmet Taner Kışlalı (1939-1999) — Academic, political scientist, columnist, intellectual
- Atilla Koç (born 1946) — Politician and former Minister of Culture and Tourism
- İsmet Kotak (1939–2011) — Turkish Cypriot politician, public administrator, journalist and columnist
- Hayri Kozakçıoğlu (1938-2013) — High-ranking civil servant and politician
- Yalçın Küçük (born 1938) — Writer, philosopher, economist and historian
- Ferit Melen (1906-1988) — Civil servant, politician and former Prime Minister
- Altan Öymen (born 1932) — Journalist, author, politician and former leader of the Republican People's Party (CHP)
- Abdüllatif Şener (born 1954) — Academic, politician, former Finance Minister and Deputy Prime Minister
- Aras Onur (born 1982) — Author, poet
- İlber Ortaylı (born 1947) — Academic and historian
- Adnan Sezgin (born 1954) — Former footballer
- Feridun Sinirlioğlu (born 1956) — Secretary-general of the Organization for Security and Co-operation in Europe, former Minister of Foreign Affairs of Turkey
- Nabi Şensoy (born 1945) — Former ambassador of Turkey to the United States
- Cahit Talas (1917–2006) — Academic and dean of the Faculty for two terms
- Emre Taner (born 1942) — Civil servant and former chief of the National Intelligence Organization (MİT)
- Osman Nuri Tekeli (1893-1976) — Civil servant and province governor
- Mümtaz'er Türköne (born 1956) — Academic and author
- Rıza Türmen (born 1941) — Former judge of the European Court of Human Rights
- Ahmet Üzümcü (born 1951) — Diplomat and director-general of the Organisation for the Prohibition of Chemical Weapons
- Hamdi Ulukaya (born 1972) — Entrepreneur, businessman and founder of Chobani

== See also ==
- Ankara University
