= Feridun Sinirlioğlu =

Turkish diplomat and politician

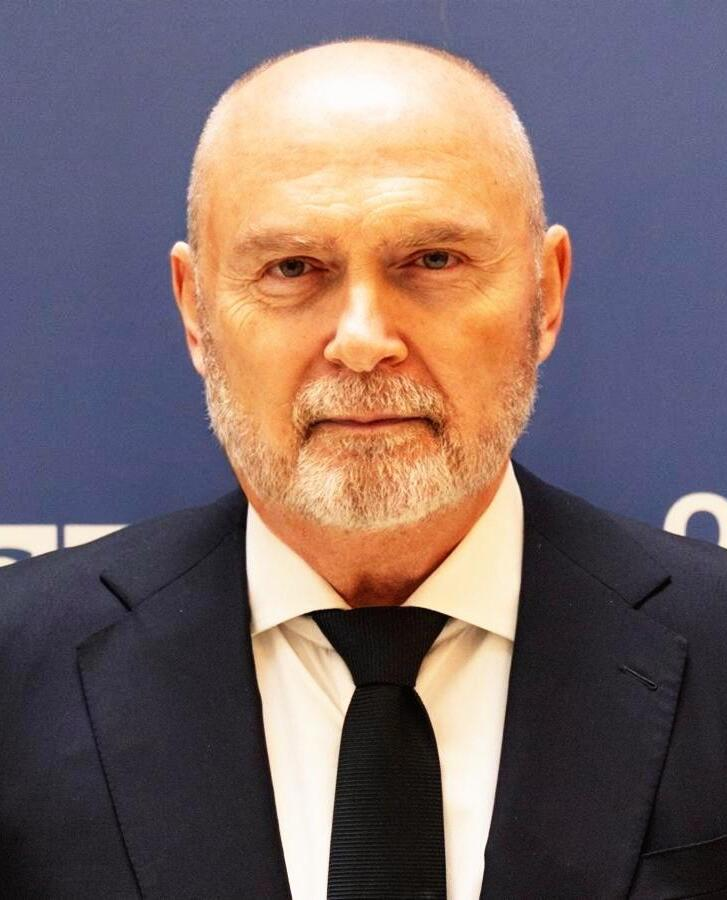

Secretary General of the Organization for Security and Co-operation in Europe
- Incumbent
- Assumed office 6 December 2024
- Preceded by: Helga Schmid

Permanent Representative of Turkey to the United Nations
- In office 15 October 2016 – 21 February 2023
- Preceded by: Yaşar Halit Çevik
- Succeeded by: Sedat Önal

44th Minister of Foreign Affairs
- In office 28 August 2015 – 24 November 2015
- Prime Minister: Ahmet Davutoğlu
- Preceded by: Mevlüt Çavuşoğlu
- Succeeded by: Mevlüt Çavuşoğlu

Undersecretary of Foreign Affairs
- In office 21 August 2009 – 6 October 2016
- Prime Minister: Recep Tayyip Erdoğan; Ahmet Davutoğlu
- Preceded by: Ertuğrul Apakan
- Succeeded by: Ümit Yalçın

Personal details
- Born: 30 January 1956 (age 70) Görele, Giresun, Turkey
- Party: Independent
- Spouse: Ayşe Sinirlioğlu
- Education: Ankara University (BA); Boğaziçi University (MA, PhD)

Feridun Hadi Sinirlioğlu (born 30 January 1956) is a Turkish diplomat and politician serving as the Secretary General of the Organization for Security and Co-operation in Europe (OSCE) since 6 December 2024. Previously, he served as permanent representative of Turkey to the United Nations from 2016 to 2023 and as the Minister of Foreign Affairs of Turkey from August 2015 to November 2015.

== Early life and career ==
Sinirlioğlu was born in 1956 in Görele, Giresun Province. He graduated from Ankara University’s Faculty of Political Science with a B.A. in 1978. He holds an M.A. and a Ph.D. in political science and international relations from Boğaziçi University. His doctoral dissertation was on Kant’s political philosophy.

== Diplomatic and bureaucratic career ==
=== Foreign roles ===
Sinirlioğlu joined the Ministry of Foreign Affairs in 1982. After working at the Human Resources Department and the Multilateral Cultural Relations Department in Ankara, he was appointed in 1983 to the Turkish Embassy in The Hague where he served as Second Secretary and then First Secretary between 1985-1988. He was then transferred to the Turkish Embassy in Beirut where he served as Deputy Chief of Mission until 1990. Returning to Ankara, between 1991 and 1992 he worked as First Secretary at the Bilateral Political Department in charge of Greece, as Special Advisor to the Deputy Undersecretary for Bilateral Political Affairs, as Special Advisor to the Undersecretary and then as Speechwriter to the Prime Minister. Following that, he served as Political Counselor at Turkey’s Mission to the United Nations in New York from 1992 until 1996.

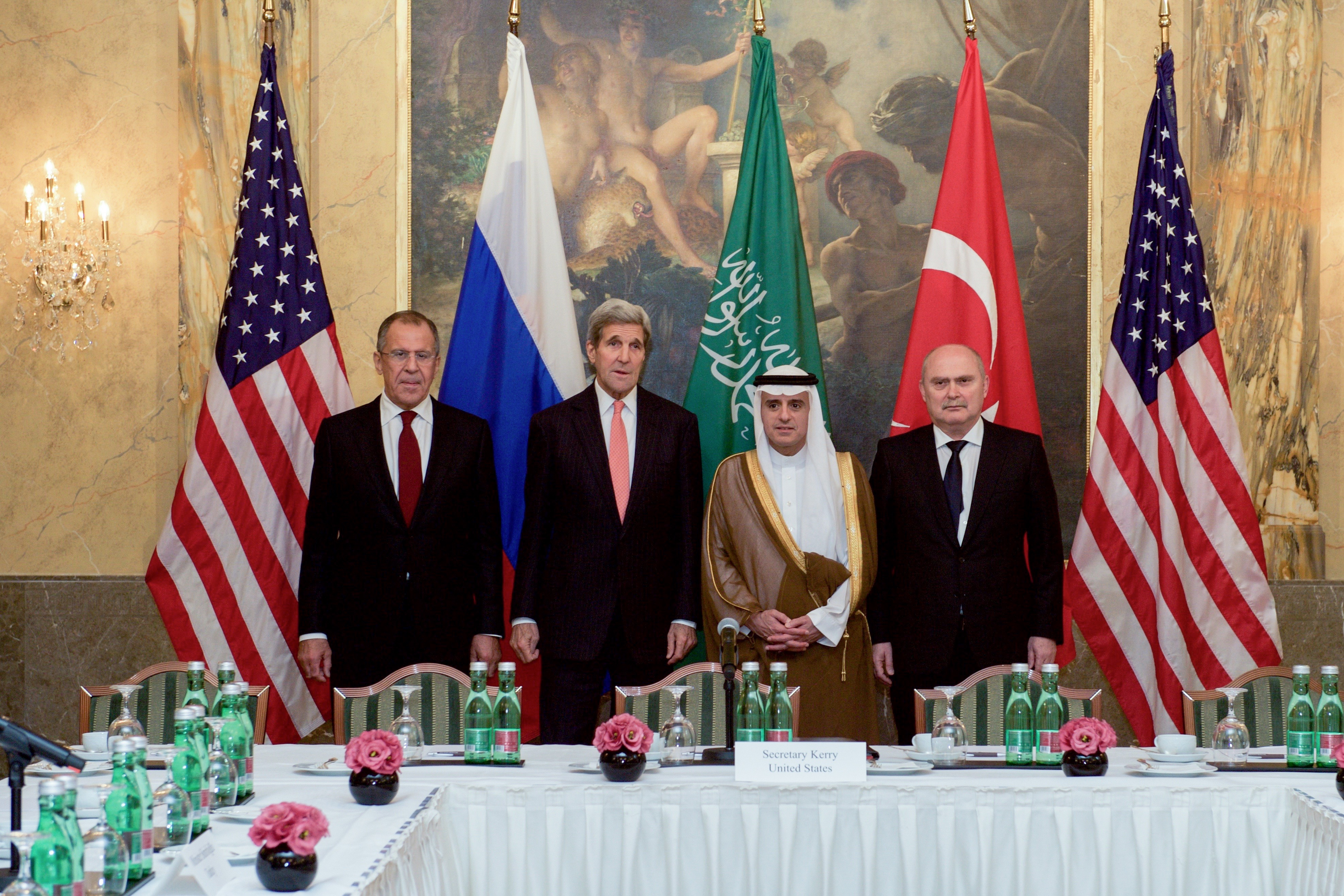
Russian Foreign Minister Sergey Lavrov, Secretary of State John Kerry, Saudi Foreign Minister Adel al-Jubeir and Turkish Foreign Minister Sinirlioğlu meeting for Syrian Peace Talks, Vienna, 2015

In 1996, he became Chief Foreign Policy Advisor to President Süleyman Demirel. After serving the President for four years, in 2000 he became Deputy Director General for the Middle East and North Africa. He was appointed as Ambassador to Israel in 2002. Upon his return to Ankara in 2007, he became Deputy Under Secretary for Bilateral Political Affairs. He was promoted as Undersecretary of the Ministry of Foreign Affairs in August 2009. He served in that capacity until August 2015.

Sinirlioğlu served as the Minister of Foreign Affairs for the interim government between 28 August 2015 and 24 November 2015. He was then reappointed as Undersecretary and served in that capacity until October 2016, when he assumed his position as the Permanent Representative of the Republic of Turkey to the United Nations. He was elected as the OSCE Secretary General by vote of all 57 countries following the 31st OSCE Ministerial Council meeting held in Malta on 6 December 2024.

On 31 October 2026, Sinirlioğlu was officially nominated by Turkey as a candidate in the 2026 United Nations Secretary-General selection.

== See also ==
- List of Turkish civil servants

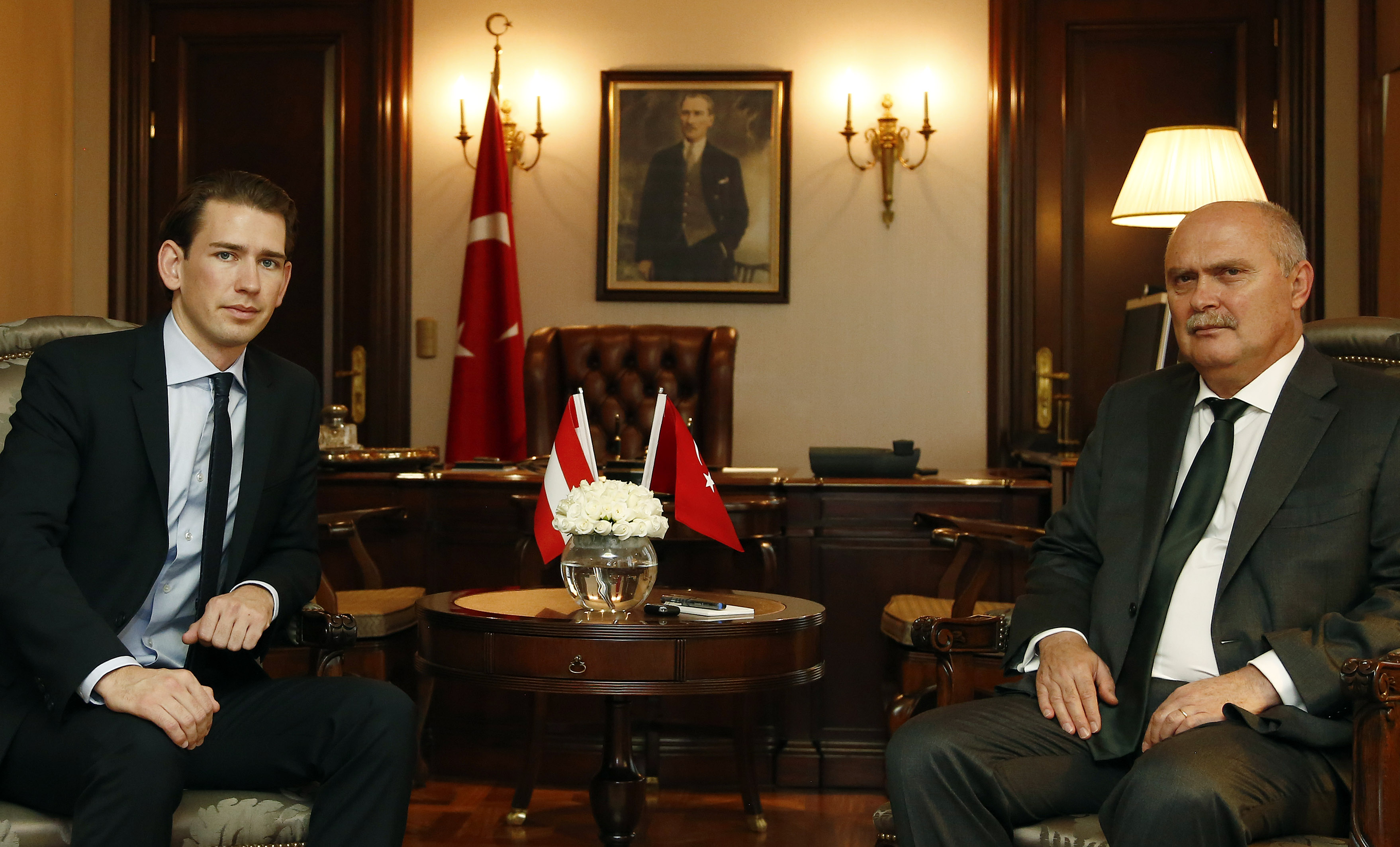
Feridun Sinirlioğlu and Chancellor of Austria Sebastian Kurz in Ankara, September 2015

Political offices
Preceded by Mevlüt Çavuşoğlu	Minister of Foreign Affairs; 2015	Succeeded by Mevlüt Çavuşoğlu
