= Greensheet =

Greensheet is a local community newspaper based in Houston, Texas, with local offices in Houston and Dallas, Texas. The newspaper was founded in March 1970. Greensheet currently has 19 print editions in Texas. 12 in Houston, Texas; 7 in Dallas, Texas and Fort Worth, Texas. Greensheet also provides an online marketplace offering free classified ads for buyers and sellers.

== History ==
Greensheet was a family-owned business, and print publication started in March 1970 in a small office at Kirby and Southwest Freeway, by Helen Gordon shortly after Gordon moved to Texas from Pittsburgh.

After successfully growing the business in the Houston area, the publication expanded. It opened its Dallas office in May 1977 and its Austin office in March 1978.

The company moved into its previous headquarters on 2601 Main Street in 1984.

In the fall of 1998, Greensheet built its initial press facility to save costs on printing its own publication, and moved its Harris presses there from its facility in Harrisburg, Pennsylvania.

In June 2005, the company brought a Goss Press to its operation. On December 28 of that year, it began printing the Houston versions of The New York Times, its largest off-set print customer to date.

In August 2018, Greensheet was sold to McElvy Media.

=== Helen's retirement ===
Helen semi-retired in 1994 and fully retired in 1995, leaving her daughter Kathy Douglass in charge of the company. In her retirement, she enjoyed creating oil portraits (she had been painting since she was young and was quite accomplished). She also continued playing the piano, which she took great pleasure in.

=== Kathy Douglass ===
The newspaper was run by Kathy Douglass, who was ranked number nine in the Top Ten Woman-Owned Businesses by the Houston Business Journal. Douglass was an active CEO and has been featured in major media, such as the Houston Business Journal and the BusinessMakers News Radio Show.

== Classifieds ==
Greensheet's print and online publication runs classified and business advertisements for local buyers, sellers and businesses. Some of the most popular Greensheet ads focus on employment, real estate, pets and automotive. Some of the other Greensheet categories are education, food and fun and services such as contractors and other home improvement. Distribution for the paper is over 800,000 according to its media kits.

== Commercial printing ==
Greensheet's printing operation handles both commercial printing and off-set printing for larger publications. The organization uses both a Goss Press and a Harris Press for the papers it serves , and also prints personal business items such as business cards.

== Community involvement ==
Greensheet is also known for its non-profit involvement. The Greensheet Education Foundation promotes literacy and writing skills among children K-12 throughout Texas. Other philanthropic Greensheet activities include Houston's Earth Day Celebration and supplemental papers dedicated to helping kids understand the environment, volunteering, healthy habits and personal finance.
