= Ömer Önhon =

Turkish diplomat (born 1960)

Ömer Önhon (born 29 December 1960) is a Turkish diplomat who served as Turkey's ambassador to Syria and Spain. He was Turkey's last ambassador to Ba'athist Syria. His father is retired ambassador Candemir Önhon, and his grandfather, Saim Önhon, was a soldier, parliamentarian, and founding member of the Turkish Jockey Club.

== Career ==
Önhon was born on 29 December 1960 in Paris, France. He is a graduate of Kingston University's Department of Economics. Since 1985, he has held various positions in the Ministry of Foreign Affairs. Between 2002 and 2006, he served as Consul General in New York City, followed by Head of the Middle East Department in 2006–2007, Deputy Director General for the Middle East in 2007–2009, and Ambassador to Syria from 2009 to 2012. During the onset of the Syrian Civil War, he was Turkey's Ambassador to Syria, conducting meetings with key Syrian politicians, including Prime Minister Adel Safar. As the conflict intensified, he reported field developments, such as the Syrian army's withdrawal from Hama. In 2012, after Syria declared several ambassadors persona non grata and Turkey-Syria relations collapsed, he returned to Ankara. Despite his tenure in Syria ending, he continued to represent Turkey in official discussions on Syria. By the end of 2012, he was appointed Deputy Undersecretary for the Middle East at the Ministry of Foreign Affairs.

Focused on Syria and the Middle East throughout his career, Önhon published his memoir, Syria Through the Ambassador’s Eyes, in 2021, recounting significant events, including the 1998 Öcalan crisis and the death of Hafez Assad.

He served as Ambassador to Spain from 6 September 2014 until 8 January 2019 and as Director General for International Security Affairs from 2019 until 2021, retiring on April 19, 2021.

== Personal life ==
Önhon is married and fluent in English.

== Works ==
- Syria Through the Ambassador’s Eyes, Remzi Kitabevi, 1st Edition (July 7, 2021), ISBN 978-9751420633.
