= Baki İlkin =

Turkish diplomat (1943–2018)

- Born: 3 October 1943; Ankara, Turkey
- Died: 29 April 2018 (aged 74); Ankara, Turkey
- Title: Representative of Turkey to the United Nations

Baki İlkin (3 October 1943 – 29 April 2018) was a Turkish diplomat and ambassador who served as the Permanent Representative of Turkey to the United Nations.

Previously, Baki İlkin served as ambassador, Deputy Under-Secretary for Bilateral Political Affairs, Ministry of Foreign Affairs of Turkey (2001–2004); ambassador of Turkey to the United States (1998–2001); ambassador of Turkey to the Netherlands (1996–1998); ambassador, director general, special advisor to the Minister of Foreign Affairs of Turkey (1993–1996); ambassador of Turkey to Denmark (1990–1993); and ambassador of Turkey to Pakistan (1987–1990).

He also held the posts of chief of cabinet for the President of Turkey (1983–1987); special advisor to the Minister of Foreign Affairs (1981-1983); counsellor at the Embassy of Turkey to the United Kingdom (1977–1981); and Chief of Cabinet for the Minister of Foreign Affairs of Turkey, as well as Chief of Section for Greece, Turkish Department of Political Affairs (1975–1977).

In addition, Baki İlkin worked as first secretary at the Embassy of Turkey to the Union of Soviet Socialist Republics (1974–1975); third and first secretary at the Embassy of Turkey to Greece (1970–1974); and Third Secretary at the Department of Cypriot-Greek Affairs, Ministry of Foreign Affairs of Turkey (1969–1970).

İlkin was married to author Nur Ilkin. He died on 29 April 2018 in Ankara.

== See also ==
- List of Turkish diplomats
