= Ahmet Üzümcü =

Turkish diplomat

Ahmet Üzümcü CMG
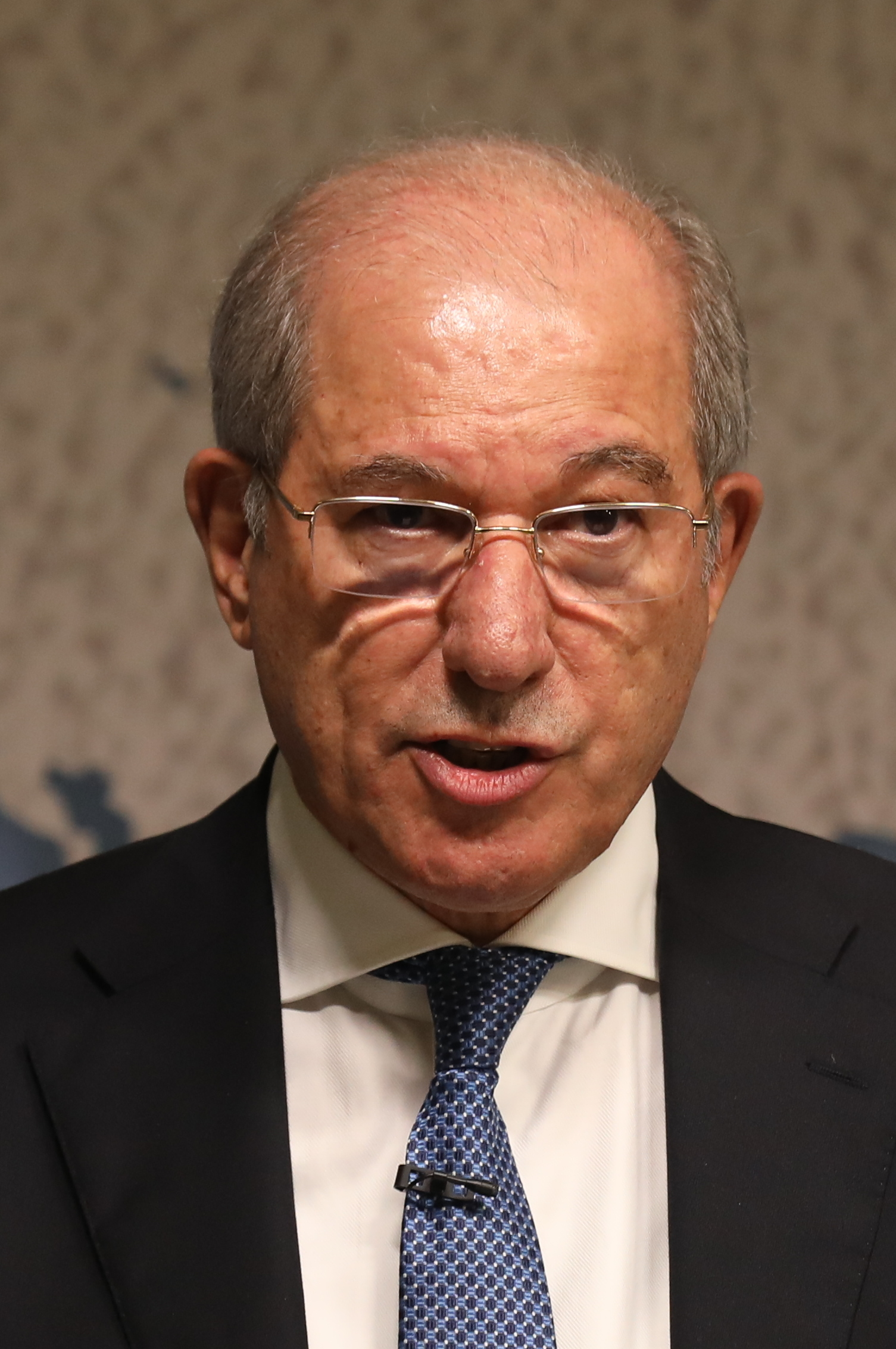
- Üzümcü in 2018
- Born: August 30, 1951 (age 75); Armutlu, Yalova, Istanbul, Turkey
- Education: Faculty of Political Science, Ankara University (BA)
- Occupation: Diplomat
- Spouse: Işıl Üzümcü

Ahmet Üzümcü (born August 30, 1951) is a Turkish career diplomat, who previously served as the Director-General of the Organisation for the Prohibition of Chemical Weapons (OPCW).

He graduated from Foreign Relations Department of the Faculty of Political Science, Ankara University.

Üzümcü was ambassador to Austria, in Vienna, from 1979 to 1982, then consul at the Consulate General in Aleppo, Syria from 1982 to 1984.

From 1986 to 1989, he represented the Turkish delegation to NATO. He continued to work for the organization until 1994.

From 1996 to 1999, he headed the staff of the Turkish Ministry of Foreign Affairs.

He was later accredited ambassador to Israel from July 28, 1999, to June 30, 2002.

Between 2002 and 2004, he served as the Permanent Representative of Turkey to NATO. Üzümcü was appointed Permanent Representative of Turkey to the United Nations Office at Geneva in 2006, serving at this post until 2010. In 2008, he became chair of the Conference on Disarmament.

Üzümcü received an Honorary Doctorate for Lifetime Achievements in Arms Control and Disarmament in 2010 from the Geneva School of Diplomacy and International Relations, prior to taking up his position at the OPCW.

In 2013, during Ahmet Üzümcü's mandate as Director-General, the Nobel Peace Prize was awarded to the OPCW.

Ahmet Üzümcü is married to Işıl Üzümcü. In 2016 he inaugurated the academic year of the master's course in International Affairs and Development – Peace Studies at Paris Dauphine University.

In 2019, he was appointed Honorary Companion of the Order of St Michael and St George (CMG), for services to international diplomacy and the rule of law.

He is a Senior Network Member at the European Leadership Network (ELN).
