= Cresa =

Chicago based real estate firm

- Industry: Real estate
- Genre: Real estate advisory
- Founded: 1993
- Headquarters: Chicago, IL, U.S.
- Number of locations: 50+
- Area served: Worldwide
- Key people: Ray Anderson (CEO); Gary Gregg (Executive Chairman); Greg Schementi (President); Tom Birnbach (Vice Chairman)
- Number of employees: 1,250 (2025)

Cresa is an international commercial real estate firm headquartered in Chicago, IL. Cresa is notable for its occupier-only real estate representation services.

== Awards ==
Cresa has received multiple awards and has been included on top achievement lists, including Site Selection's Service Provider of the Year, American Business Journals’ Best Places to Work, INC. 5000, and Realcomm's “Top Ten Most Innovative Brokerage Firms.” Several Cresa offices have been consistently honored with Best Places to Work recognition.

In 2010, Cresa was certified as a "Sustainable Business Leader", having completed the Sustainable Business Leader Program (SBLP) -- a program of the Sustainable Business Network (SBN) that provides guidance, support and technical assistance to facilitate the "greening" of small and medium-sized businesses.

United Space Alliance awarded Cresa its 2010 Small Business of the Year award for the firm's work in developing USA's “workplace of the future” office standards.

== Notable personnel ==
Tod Lickerman was appointed CEO in 2021; Mr. Lickerman joined Cresa's Board in 2019 and has extensive commercial real estate experience spanning over 35 years. Mr. Lickerman previously served as Global President and Americas CEO at Cushman & Wakefield. Prior, he served as Global CEO of DTZ, where he led the firm in taking the company private and acquiring Cassidy Turley and Cushman & Wakefield. In total, he helped acquire and integrate 20 companies into the global platform company that Cushman & Wakefield is today with revenues in excess of $7 billion. Earlier in his career, Mr. Lickerman served as CEO of Corporate Solutions Americas at JLL and ran several divisions including healthcare, energy, and European facility management. In February 2026, Ray Anderson was appointed chief executive officer of Cresa, succeeding Tod Lickerman.
