= Yaşar Halit Çevik =

Turkish diplomat (born 1955)

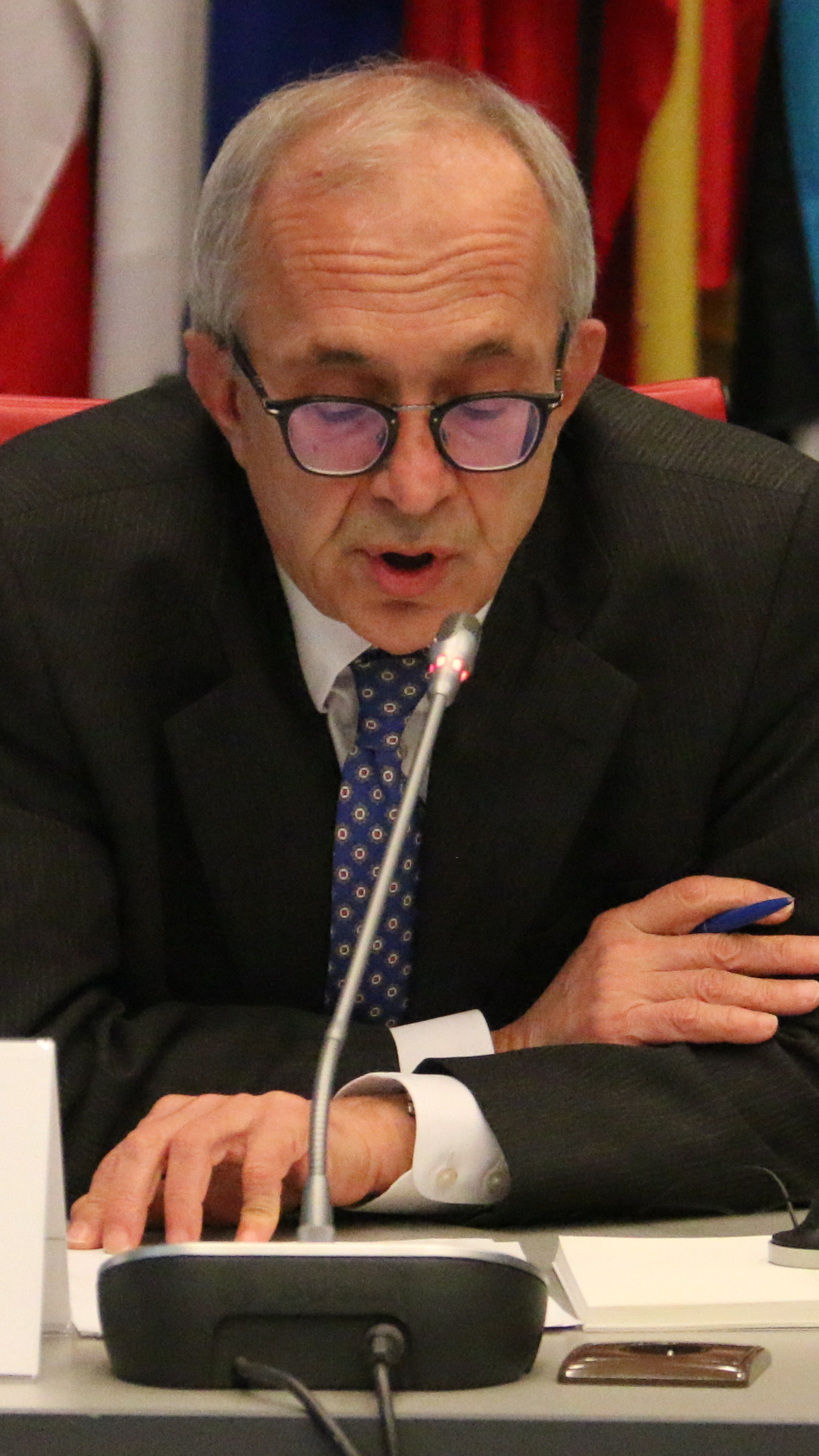
- Çevik in February 2021

Yaşar Halit Çevik (born 1955 in Gölcük, Kocaeli, Turkey) is a Turkish ambassador.

== Private life and education ==
He finished in 1978 his studies at the department of international relationships at the Ankara Üniversitesi Siyasal Bilgiler Fakültesi (Ankara University School of Political Science). He speaks English. He is married and has two children.

== Working life ==
In 1979, he started to work for Kültür İşleri-İkili Ekonomik İşler Dairesi (Government Office for Cultural Affairs-Bilateral Economical Affairs). He worked at the embassy of Khartum in 1981 and became the consul of Turkey in Stuttgart in 1983. In 1989, he became consul at the consulate general of Turkey in Athens. After several diplomatic assignments, he was the consul general in Zurich between 1995-1997 and the ambassador to Syria between 2004 and 2009. In 2009, he became the undersecretary for bilateral political affairs. From 2012 to October 2016, he is the Permanent Representative of Turkey to the United Nations. Since 2019 he heads the OSCE Special Monitoring Mission to the eastern Ukraine as a chief monitor.
