= Ahmet Yıldız (politician, born 1964) =

Turkish diplomat

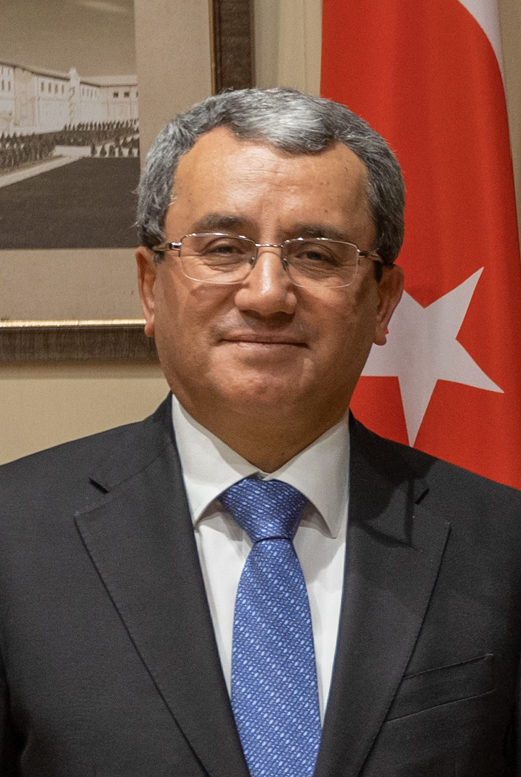
- Yıldız in 2023

22nd Permanent Representative of Turkey to the United Nations
- Incumbent
- Assumed office 24 April 2024
- President: Recep Tayyip Erdoğan
- Minister: Hakan Fidan
- Preceded by: Sedat Önal

Deputy Minister of Foreign Affairs
- In office 1 July 2016 – 26 April 2018; 21 June 2023– 25 April 2024
- President: Recep Tayyip Erdoğan
- Minister: Mevlüt Çavuşoğlu; Hakan Fidan

Member of the Grand National Assembly
- In office 24 June 2018 – 21 June 2023
- Constituency: Denizli (2018)

Senior Diplomatic Adviser to the President
- In office 4 September 2014 – 1 July 2016
- President: Recep Tayyip Erdoğan

Senior Diplomatic Adviser to the Prime Minister
- In office 1 July 2014 – 4 September 2014
- Prime Minister: Recep Tayyip Erdoğan

Ambassador of Turkey to Bosnia and Herzegovina
- In office 13 November 2011 – 1 July 2014
- President: Abdullah Gül
- Minister: Ahmet Davutoğlu
- Preceded by: Vefahan Ocak
- Succeeded by: Cihad Erginay

Consul General of Turkey in Mosul
- In office 1 December 2009 – 13 November 2011
- President: Abdullah Gül
- Minister: Ahmet Davutoğlu
- Preceded by: Hüseyin Avni Botsalı
- Succeeded by: Muhittin Ahmet Yazal

Personal details
- Born: 23 January 1964 (age 62) Denizli, Turkey
- Party: Justice and Development Party
- Children: 3

Ahmet Yıldız (born 23 January 1964) is a Turkish politician and diplomat who currently serves as the 22nd Permanent Representative of Turkey to the United Nations. He previously served as Deputy Minister of Foreign Affairs from 22 June 2023 to 25 April 2024 and as a member of the Grand National Assembly from 7 July 2018 to 14 May 2023.

== Life and career ==
Ahmet Yıldız graduated from Ankara University’s Faculty of Political Sciences, Department of International Relations. He joined the Ministry of Foreign Affairs in 1989 and served in various diplomatic posts, including at the Turkish Embassy in Damascus (2000–2002, 2005–2006) and as Consul General in Jeddah (2006–2008) and Mosul (2009–2011).

He was Ambassador of Turkey to Bosnia and Herzegovina from 2011 to 2014. Afterward, he served as Senior Diplomatic Adviser to Recep Tayyip Erdoğan and was a member of the Foreign Policy Advisory Board until 2016.

Appointed Deputy Minister of Foreign Affairs in 2016, Yıldız resigned in 2018 to enter parliament. He represented Denizli in the 27th Grand National Assembly as a member of the Justice and Development Party (AKP) and chaired the Turkish Group in the Parliamentary Assembly of the Council of Europe.

He returned as Deputy Minister of Foreign Affairs in 2023, serving until April 2024. He is currently Turkey’s 22nd Permanent Representative to the United Nations.

== Personal life ==
He is married with three children and speaks English and Arabic.
