= The Geneva Group (United Nations) =

- Abbreviation: GG
- Formation: 1964; 61 years ago
- Legal status: Active
- Headquarters: Geneva, Switzerland
- Head: Co-Chairs; United States of America; United Kingdom of Great Britain and Northern Ireland
- Website: www.thegenevagroup.net

The Geneva Group is an informal group of 17 United Nations Member States that aim to improve governance and management across United Nations system.

The Group consists of the largest budgetary contributors to the United Nations. To become a full member, countries are required to contribute more than one percent of the regular budget of the United Nations.

== History ==
The Geneva Group was founded in 1964 at the initiative of the United States and the United Kingdom to facilitate exchanges on United Nations budget and management issues. The Group was created around the time when membership in the United Nations was increasing quickly, from the original 76 members to 113 members in 1963.

This change made closer cooperation in budgetary and management matters seem more important to the larger contributors to the budget. These countries wanted to ensure that the funds available were used in the most efficient way possible, as well as to limit the increase in assessed contributions of the Geneva Group members.

== Structure ==
The Group functions at three levels: United Nations directors, mission personnel who focus on governance and management issues, and Ambassadors

=== Focal groups ===
The Group comprises Focal Groups that focus on specific thematic issues that can cut across multiple agencies, funds and programs. Groups are located in both New York and Geneva and exchange ideas and collaborate on shared areas of interest. Currently active focal groups include:

- Geneva and New York: Oversight, Human resources
- Geneva: Buildings. Budgets
- New York: Information communications technology. Regular and peacekeeping budgets

=== Local groups ===
Local Groups consist of experts who meet several times throughout the year. They monitor and make recommendations to United Nations agencies about governance and management/ There are eleven local groups in Geneva, two in Vienna, and one each in Paris, Rome and The Hague. These groups routinely receive briefings on documents and strategies prior to their formal release, and provide input to agencies to try to influence their direction and policies. Finally, each Local Group submits an annual report to the Expert Level Meeting (ELM) which provide input for the Directors to consider at their Consultative Level Meetings (CLM).

Local Groups also allow for information sharing that helps to ensure that the Geneva Group's Member States' national statements in governing body meetings cover issues of importance to the Geneva Group.

== Meetings ==
=== Consultative Level Meeting (CLM) ===
United Nations directors meet at CLMs twice a year, in the spring and in the autumn. The spring meeting takes place in Geneva and usually focuses on issues related to United Nations specialized and technical agencies based in Geneva, Paris, Vienna and Rome. While the autumn meeting takes place in New York and focuses on issues related to United Nations headquarters.

=== Expert Level Meeting (ELM) ===
The ELM occurs in the spring just before the Geneva CLM and involves mission personnel from Geneva, Vienna, Rome and Paris, as well as experts from Member States and from New York. At this meeting, trends and issues of crosscutting importance to the United Nations system are identified. These issues are studied and discussed before being sent to the CLM with recommendations for action.

== Members ==
The current members of the Group are:

- Australia
- Belgium
- Canada
- France
- Germany
- Japan
- Italy
- Mexico
- Netherlands
- Norway
- Russian Federation *Suspended March 2022 following the invasion of Ukraine
- Republic of Korea
- Spain
- Sweden
- Switzerland
- Turkey
- United Kingdom of Great Britain and Northern Ireland
- United States of America
