= 1960 in Turkey =

- Centuries: 20th; 21st
- Decades: 1940s; 1950s; 1960s; 1970s; 1980s
- See also: List of years in Turkey

Events in the year 1960 in Turkey.

== Parliament ==
- 11th Parliament of Turkey (up to 27 May)

== Incumbents ==
- President

Celal Bayar (up to 27 May)
Cemal Gürsel (from 27 May)

- Prime Minister

Adnan Menderes (up to 27 May)
Cemal Gürsel (from 27 May)

- Leader of the opposition

İsmet İnönü (up to 27 May)

== Ruling party and the main opposition ==
- Ruling party

Democrat Party (DP) (up to 27 May)

- Main opposition

Republican People's Party (CHP) (up to 27 May)

== Cabinet ==
- 23rd government of Turkey (up to 27 May)
- 24th government of Turkey (from 27 May)

== Events ==
- 2 April – In Yeşilhisar, because of the interference of ruling party partisans İsmet İnönü the leader of the opposition was not able to continue his election campaign
- 27 April – The ruling party formed a committee (popularly called Sancar komisyonu) to convict the opposition
- 5 May – Demonstrations in Ankara (known as 555K)
- 27 May – Coup d'état
- 12 June – Beşiktaş won the championship of Turkish football league.
- 22 October – Census (population 27754820)
- 15 November – 14 members of the junta were appointed to diplomatic missionaries (exiled)

== Births ==
- 23 January – Güldal Akşit, politician
- 3 February – İlyas Tüfekçi, footballer
- 8 May – Recep Akdağ, MD and politician
- 14 May – Sinan Alaağaç, footballer (goalkeeper)
- 11 June Mehmet Öz, MD
- 18 November – Yeşim Ustaoğlu, filmmaker and screenwriter
- 26 December – Cem Uzan, industrialist and politician

== Deaths ==
- 22 May – İbrahim Çallı (aged 78), painter
- 30 May – Namık Gedik (aged 49), former minister of Interior (suicide)
- 23 June – İsmail Hakkı Tonguç (aged 67), one of the founders of the Village Institutes.
- 29 July – Hasan Saka (aged 74), a former prime minister (1940s)

== Gallery ==
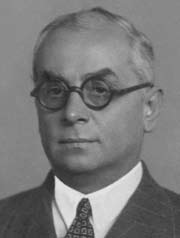
Celal Bayar

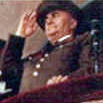
Cemal Gürsel

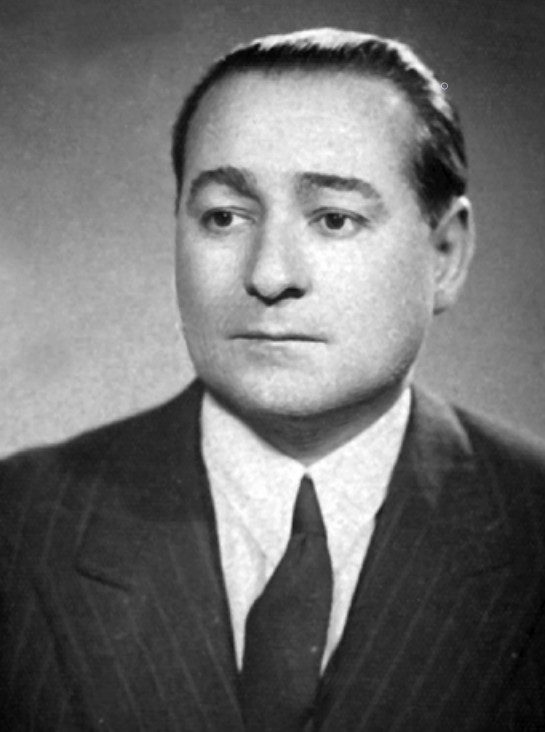
Adnan Menderes

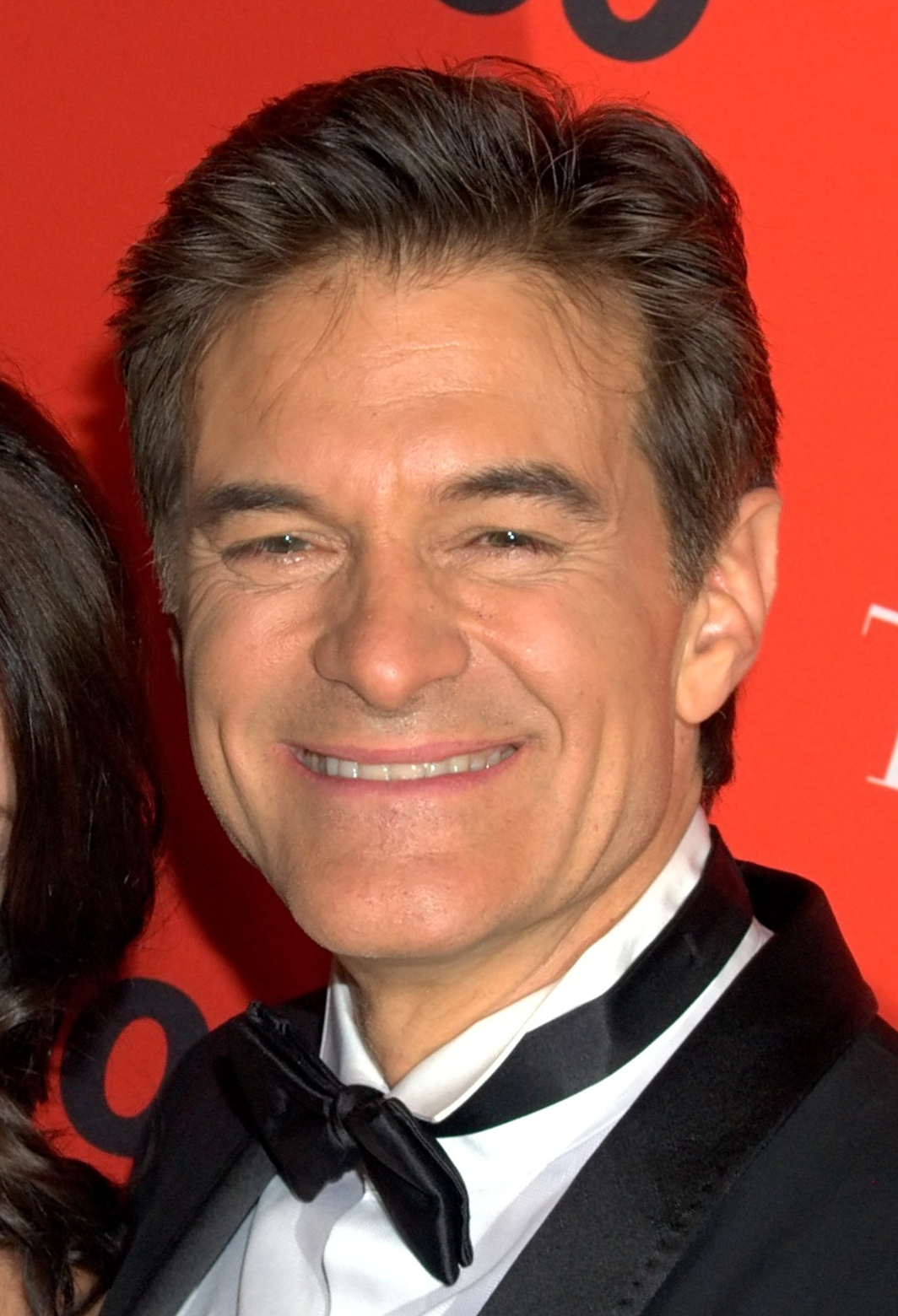
Mehmet Öz

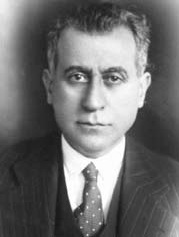
Hasan Saka

== See also ==
- 1959–60 Milli Lig
- Turkey at the 1960 Summer Olympics
- Turkey at the 1960 Winter Olympics
