= 1955 in Turkey =

- Centuries: 20th; 21st
- Decades: 1930s; 1940s; 1950s; 1960s; 1970s
- See also: List of years in Turkey

Events in the year 1955 in Turkey.

== Parliament ==
- 10th Parliament of Turkey

== Incumbents ==
- President – Celal Bayar
- Prime Minister – Adnan Menderes
- Leader of the opposition – İsmet İnönü

== Ruling party and the main opposition ==
- Ruling party – Democrat Party (DP)
- Main opposition – Republican People's Party (CHP)

== Cabinet ==
- 21st government of Turkey (up to 9 December)
- 22nd government of Turkey (from 9 December)

== Events ==
- 24 January – Mine accident in Zonguldak

19 February – Agreement between Turkey and Greece on the rehabilitation of the River Meriç.

- 24 February – CENTO agreement
- 15 April – Fuat Köprülü one of the founders of the Democrat Party (DP) resigned from the government
- 22 May – Polemics in the parliament
- 16 July – The magnitude 6.8 Soke–Aydin earthquake shook the Aydın Province with a maximum Mercalli intensity of IX (Violent), causing severe damage and four deaths.
- 6/7 September – Unchecked demonstrations in Istanbul and the other big cities against Greeks. Martial law in three cities.
- 15 October – A crisis in the ruling party about the right to prove in press. Nine MPs were expelled from the party and Ten MPs resigned.
- 23 October – Census (the population: 24,064,763)
- 13 November – Local elections
- 20 December – Liberty Party was founded by the MPs expelled from the DP.

== Notable births ==
- 22 January – Filiz Koçali, feminist activist
- 2 March – Samet Aybaba, former football player and currently coach
- 20 March – Zerrin Güngör, president of the Council of State
- 1 April – İlhan İrem, singer
- 5 May – Mehmet Terzi, medal winning long distance runner
- 18 May – Altan Erkekli, actor
- 23 May – Mansur Yavaş, politician
- 31 May – Nilüfer Yumlu, singer
- 18 July – Banu Avar, journalist, political commentator
- 14 August – Güler Sabancı, industrialist
- 3 September – Cem Boyner, industrialist
- 3 October – Buket Uzuner, writer
- 2 December, Murat Bardakçı, journalist and historian

== Notable deaths ==
- 22 May – Nene Hatun, heroine who fought against the Russians during the Battle of Erzurum (born 1857)
- 1 July – Adnan Adıvar, politician and historian (born 1882)
- 2 July – Fatma Seher Erden, heroine who fought during the Turkish War of Independence (Kara Fatma; born 1888)
- 25 July – Ali Naci Karacan, journalist and publisher (born 1896)
- 21 August – Münir Hüsrev Göle, politician (born 1890)

== Gallery ==
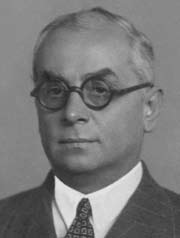
Celal Bayar

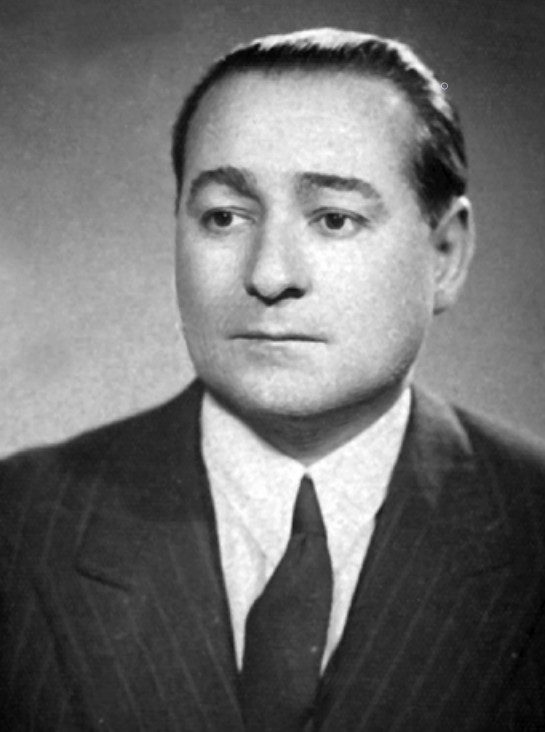
Adnan Menderes

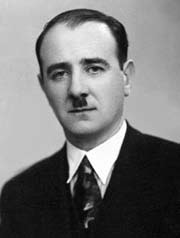
Fuat Köprülü

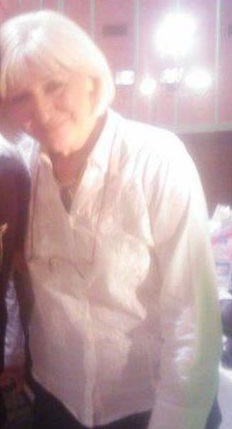
Banu Avar

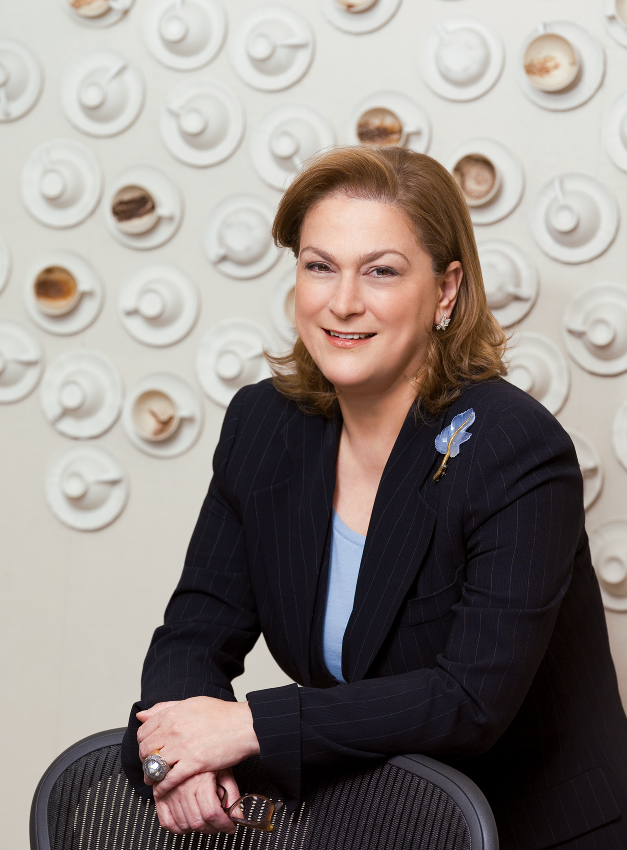
Güler Sabancı

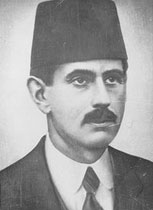
Adnan Adıvar

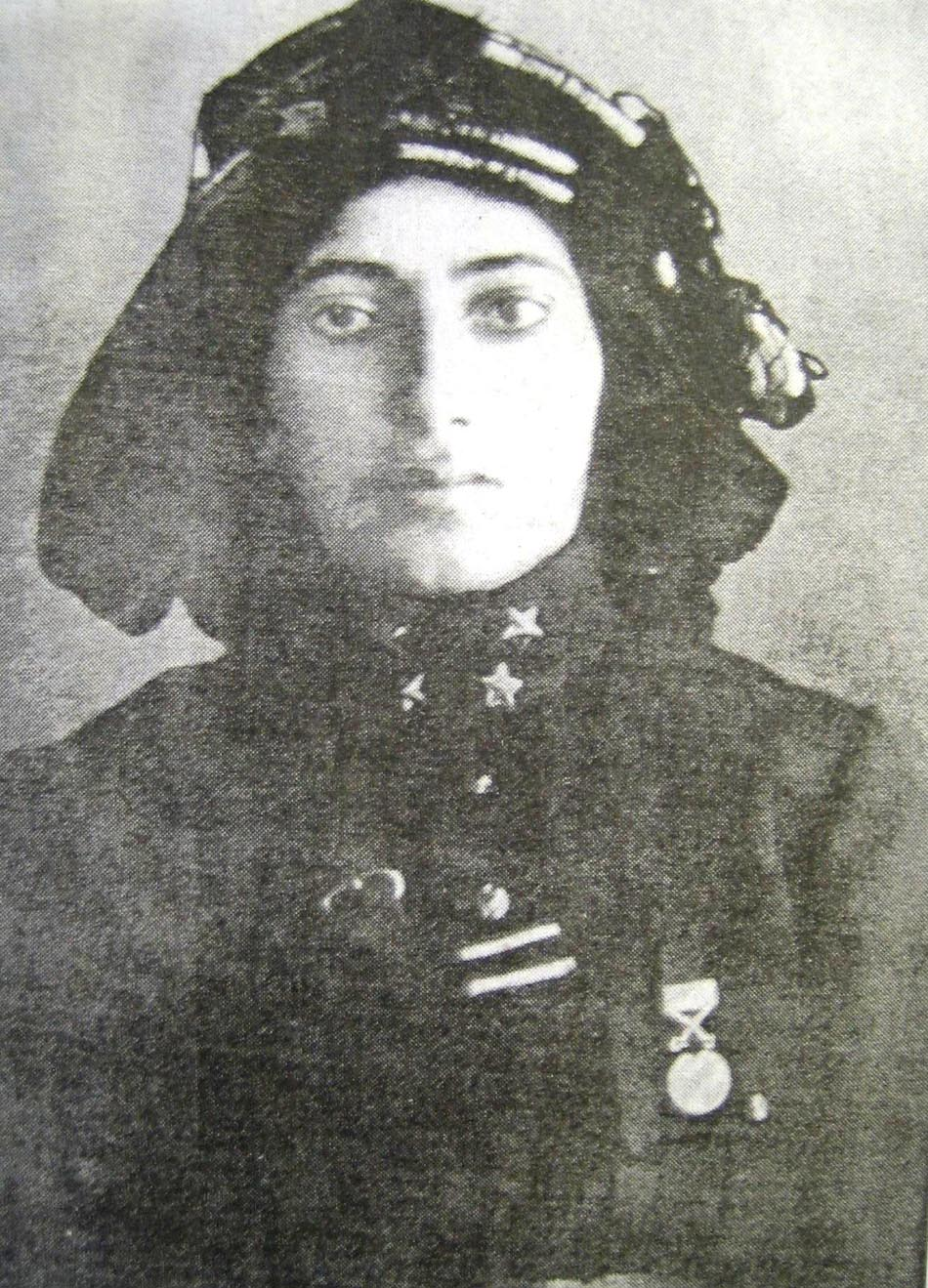
Fama Seher Erden
