= 1957 in Turkey =

- Centuries: 20th; 21st
- Decades: 1930s; 1940s; 1950s; 1960s; 1970s
- See also: List of years in Turkey

Events in the year 1957 in Turkey.

== Parliament ==
- 10th Parliament of Turkey (up to 1 Nov)
- 11th Parliament of Turkey

== Incumbents ==
- President – Celal Bayar
- Prime Minister – Adnan Menderes
- Leader of the opposition – İsmet İnönü

== Ruling party and the main opposition ==
- Ruling party – Democrat Party (DP)
- Main opposition – Republican People's Party (CHP)

== Cabinet ==
- 22nd government of Turkey (up to 25 December)
- 23rd government of Turkey (from 25 December)

== Events ==
- 24–25 April – 1957 Fethiye earthquakes
- 26 May - 1957 Abant earthquake
- 30 June – Ministry of Industry was established
- 2 July – Osman Bölükbaşı, the chairman of Republican Nation Party was arrested
- 25 September – Operation Deep Water, a big NATO exercise around Çanakkale.
- 27 October – General elections (DP 419 seats, CHP 173 seats CMP 4 seats, HP 4 seats)
- 20 October – Yarımburgaz train disaster, the worst train accident with 95 dead and 150 wounded people
- 25 November – Ministry of Tourism was established
- 28 November – Liberty Party (HP) was merged to Republican People's Party (CHP)

== Births ==
- 8 February, Mehmet Ali Erbil, showman and actor
- 26 April – Bedri Baykam, painter
- 1 August – Sırrı Sakık, politician
- 17 September – Nurten Yılmaz, Austrian politician
- 23 September – Tunch Ilkin, footballer and broadcaster (died 2021)
- 28 October – Ahmet Kaya, singer (died 2000)
- 4 November – Zerrin Özer, singer
- 18 November – Ali Nesin, mathematician

== Deaths ==
- 17 May – Nurullah Ataç (born in 1898), essayist and literary critic
- 1 October – Abdülhalik Renda (born in 1881), former government minister and the speaker of Parliament
- 13 November – Nuri Demirağ (born in 1886), industrialist and the founder of National Development Party
- 9 December – Ali İhsan Sabis (born in 1882), retired general
- 17 December – Hüseyin Cahit Yalçın (born in 1875), journalist, writer

== Gallery ==
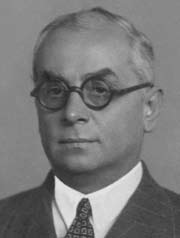
Celal Bayar

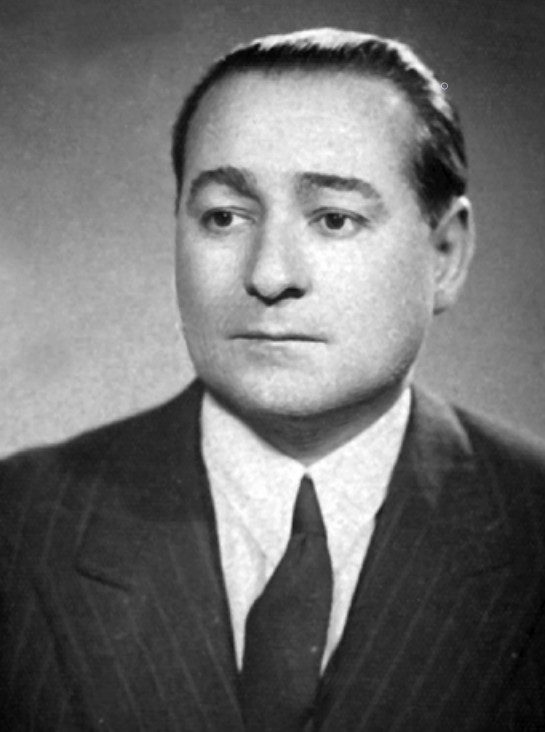
Adnan Menderes

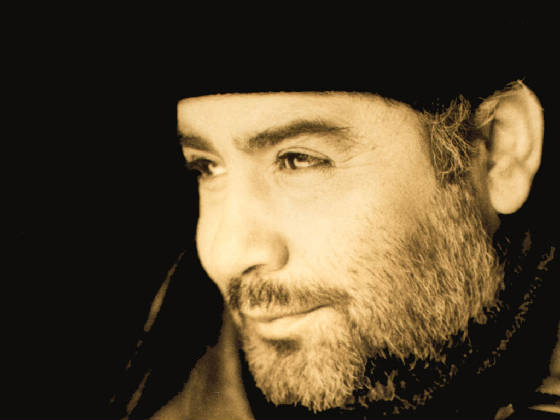
Ahmet Kaya

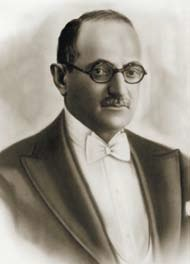
Abdülhalik Renda

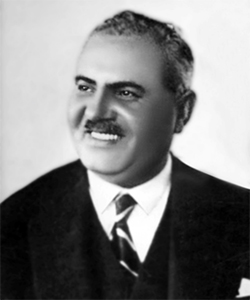
Nuri Demirağ

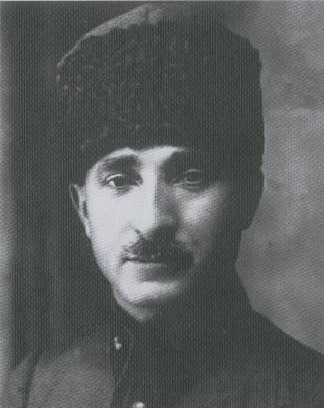
Ali İhsan Sabis
