= 1959 in Turkey =

- Centuries: 20th; 21st
- Decades: 1930s; 1940s; 1950s; 1960s; 1970s
- See also: List of years in Turkey

Events in the year 1959 in Turkey.

== Parliament ==
- 11th Parliament of Turkey

== Incumbents ==
- President – Celal Bayar
- Prime Minister – Adnan Menderes
- Leader of the opposition – İsmet İnönü

== Ruling party and the main opposition ==
- Ruling party – Democrat Party (DP)
- Main opposition – Republican People's Party (CHP)

== Cabinet ==
- 23rd government of Turkey

== Events ==
- 11 February – Zürich Agreement concerning the Cyprus issue
- 17 February – Turkish Airlines aircraft SEC crashed in London. Prime minister Adnan Menderes survived
- 18 February – London Agreement concerning the Cyprus issue
- 1 May – Opposition leader İsmet İnönü got attacked in Uşak
- 4 May – Opposition leader İsmet İnönü got attacked in Istanbul (Topkapı event).
- 14 June – Fenerbahçe won the championship of the Turkish football league
- 27 September – Kasım Gülek, the secretary general of CHP resigned

== Births ==
- 12 February – Ercan Akbay, writer, painter and musician
- 26 February – Ahmet Davutoğlu, prime minister
- 1 April – Banu Alkan, actress
- 7 April – Ali Sürmeli, actor
- 10 April – Ikram Dinçer, politician
- 22 April – Musa Uzunlar, actor
- 24 April – Eren Keskin, activist
- 3 May – Tuğba Çetin (Ahu Tuğba), actress
- 15 July – Bergen Sarılmışer, singer
- 27 November – Gani Müjde scriptwriter
- 23 December – Demet Akbağ, theatre actress

== Deaths ==
- 10 January – Şükrü Kaya (aged 76), former government minister (5th – 9th government of Turkey)
- 14 march – Faik Ahmet Barutçu (aged 63), former deputy prime minister (17th government of Turkey)
- 16 September – Süleyman Hilmi Tunahan, Islamic scholar
- 24 October – Osman Nihat Akın, composer

== Gallery ==
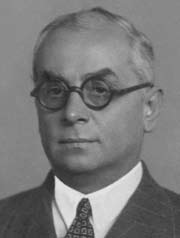
Celal Bayar

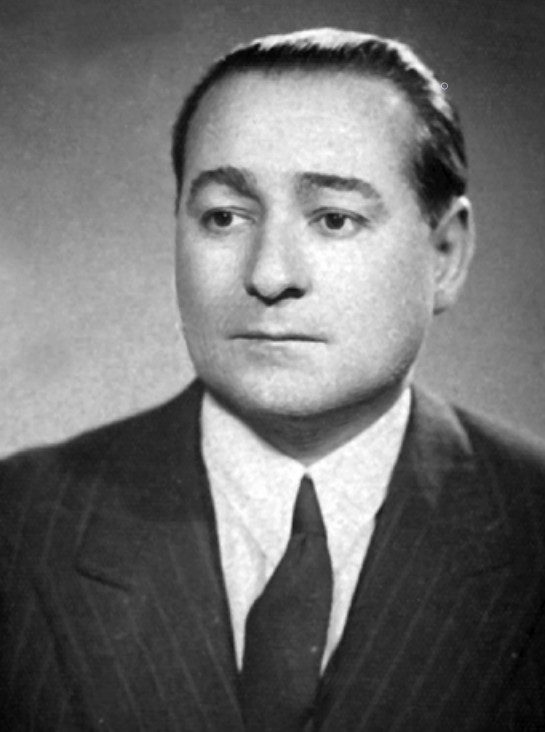
Adnan Menderes

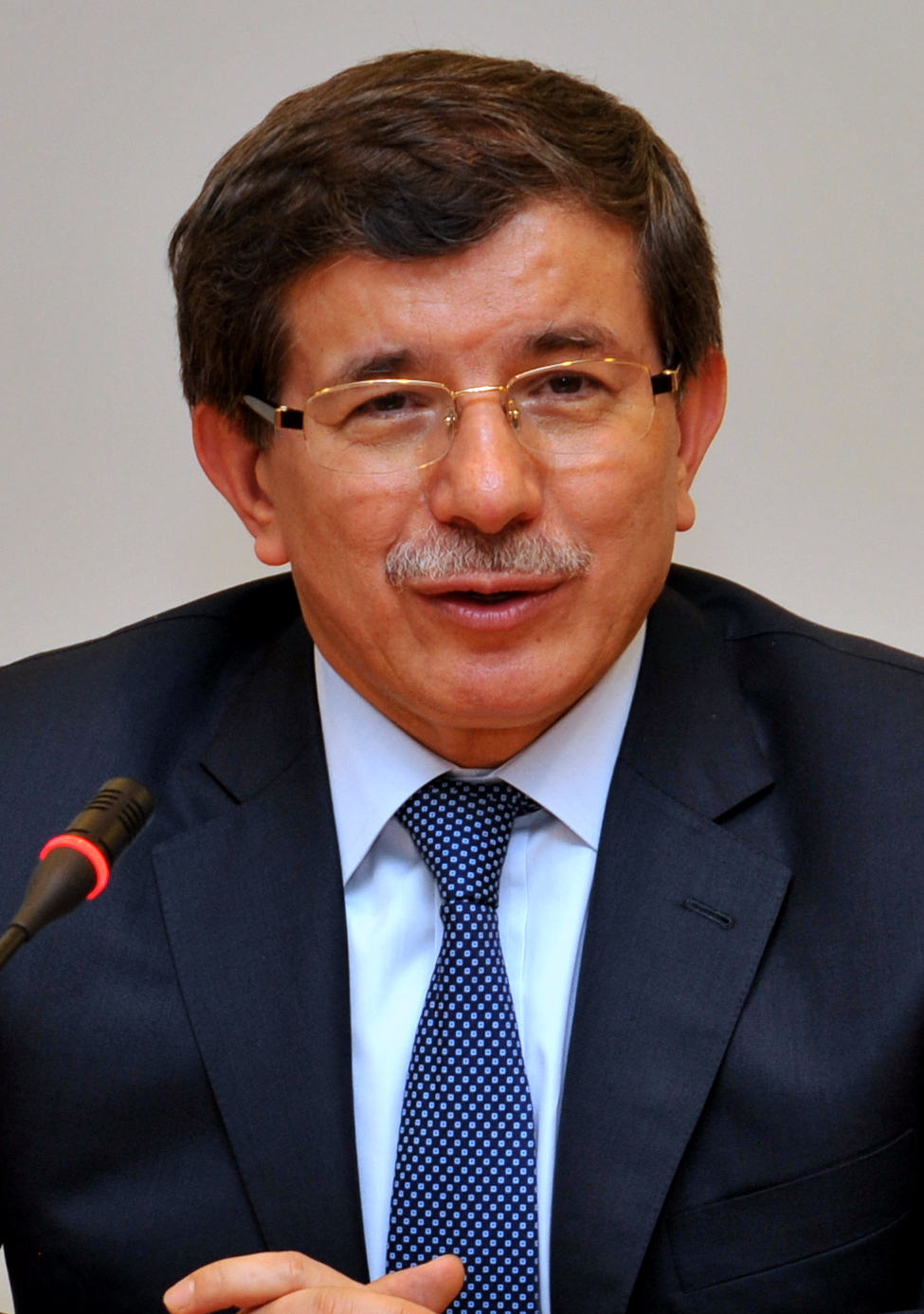
Ahmet Davutoğlu

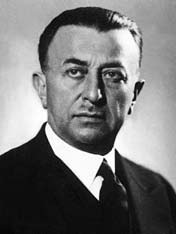
Şükrü Kaya

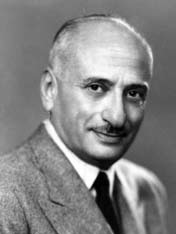
Faik Ahmet Barutçu

== See also ==
- 1959 Milli Lig
