= Battle of Qbaada =

Final engagement of the Russo-Circassian War in 1864

- Part of the Russo-Circassian War
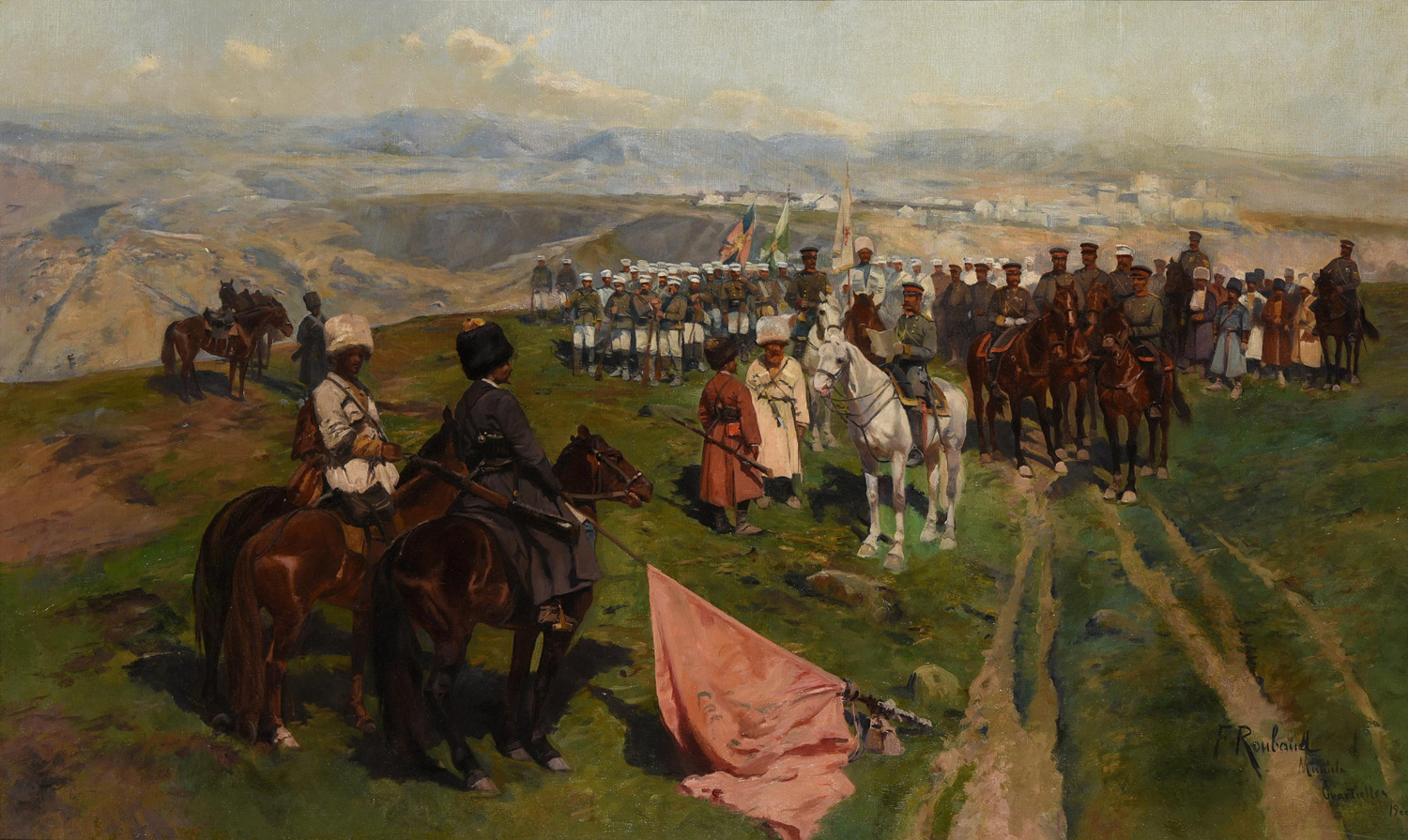
- End of the Caucasian War (1900) by François "Franz" Jean Roubaud
Date	2 June [O.S. 21 May] 1864
Location	Qbaada (now Krasnaya Polyana) 43°40′43″N 40°12′19″E
Result	Russian victory
Territorial changes	Completion of the Russian conquest of the Caucasus

Belligerents
Russia	Circassia

Commanders and leaders
Michael Nikolaevich; Dmitry Svyatopolk-Mirsky; Vasily Geyman; Vasily Potto; Pavel Grabbe; Pavel Shatilov; Grigory Zass	Unknown

Units involved
Imperial Russian Army	Militias (Abreks, etc.)
- During the Circassian genocide, approximately 1,500,000 Circassians and other Caucasians were expelled from their ancestral homeland. The majority of this figure was displaced to the Ottoman Empire and a much smaller amount to Qajar Iran. An unknown amount of these deportees died before reaching their destination.
- Location within Krasnodar Krai Location within the Southern Federal District Location within European Russia

The Battle of Qbaada (Note: Adyghe: Ӏаткъуадж зао, romanized: 'atqwadj zawə; Abkhaz: Гәбаадәы аибашьра, romanized: Gubaadu aibashra; Russian: Кра́снополя́нская битва) took place in today's Krasnaya Polyana on 2 June [O.S. 21 May] 1864. It is widely accepted as the final military engagement of the Russo-Circassian War, as the Circassian people could no longer continue to resist the invading Imperial Russian Army.

A significant development in the wider Caucasian War, it was after the Battle of Qbaada that the Russian Empire annexed Circassia and initiated the Circassian genocide, in which 95% to 97% of the country's population was ethnically cleansed, leading to the creation of the Circassian diaspora.

== Events ==
=== Battle ===
The Circassians gathered 20,000 men and women, mostly local villagers, Abreks, and tribal horsemen. The Imperial Russian Army advanced from four sides with 250,000 soldiers, mostly Cossacks and Russians. Circassian fighters attempted to break through the Russian lines, but were hit with artillery before they managed to reach the front, and were soon defeated by Russian infantry.

=== Aftermath ===
A military parade was held after the battle and 100 surviving Circassian warriors were publicly executed. Russian troops then continued raiding and torching Circassian villages, driving many of their inhabitants into the Black Sea and destroying much of the landscape to prevent them from returning. The ensuing Circassian genocide saw millions of Circassians and other Caucasians killed or expelled from Circassia and the rest of the Caucasus. Most of the deportees were sent to the Ottoman Empire, but many succumbed to injuries, disease, or starvation and exhaustion. The annexation of Circassia by the Russian Empire marked the end of the Caucasian War and thereby the Russian conquest of the Caucasus.
