= Sefine Shipyard =

Turkish shipyard

- Native name: Sefine Tersanesi
- Company type: Shipyard
- Industry: Shipbuilding
- Founded: 2005; 21 years ago
- Headquarters: Altınova, Yalova, Turkey
- Area served: Worldwide
- Website: sefine.com.tr

Sefine Shipyard (Turkish: Sefine Tersanesi) is located in Yalova Province, Turkey. It builds a wide variety of ships, including tugboats, fireboats, passenger/car ferries and well boats.

== Overview ==
Sefine Shipyard, which is owned by the Sefine Denizcilik Tersanecilik Turizm A.Ş, a Koloğlu Holding company, was established in 2005. It is located close to the Osman Gazi Bridge in the Shipyards Area of Altınova district in Yalova Province, Turkey. Shipbuilding at the yard started in 2008 and the following year, the construction of a drydock began. Sefine Shipyard covers 140,000 m^{2} (1,500,000 sq ft) and includes a nearly 11,000 m^{2} (120,000 sq ft) covered workshop for steel sheet processing, a 160 m × 60 m (520 ft × 200 ft) shipway, a 240 m × 42 m (787 ft × 138 ft) dry dock, a 200 m (660 ft) long quay and a 282 m × 49 m (925 ft × 161 ft) floating dock. The shipyard employs 370 personnel, including around 80 engineers. The workforce varies between 1,500 and over 2,000.

== Production ==
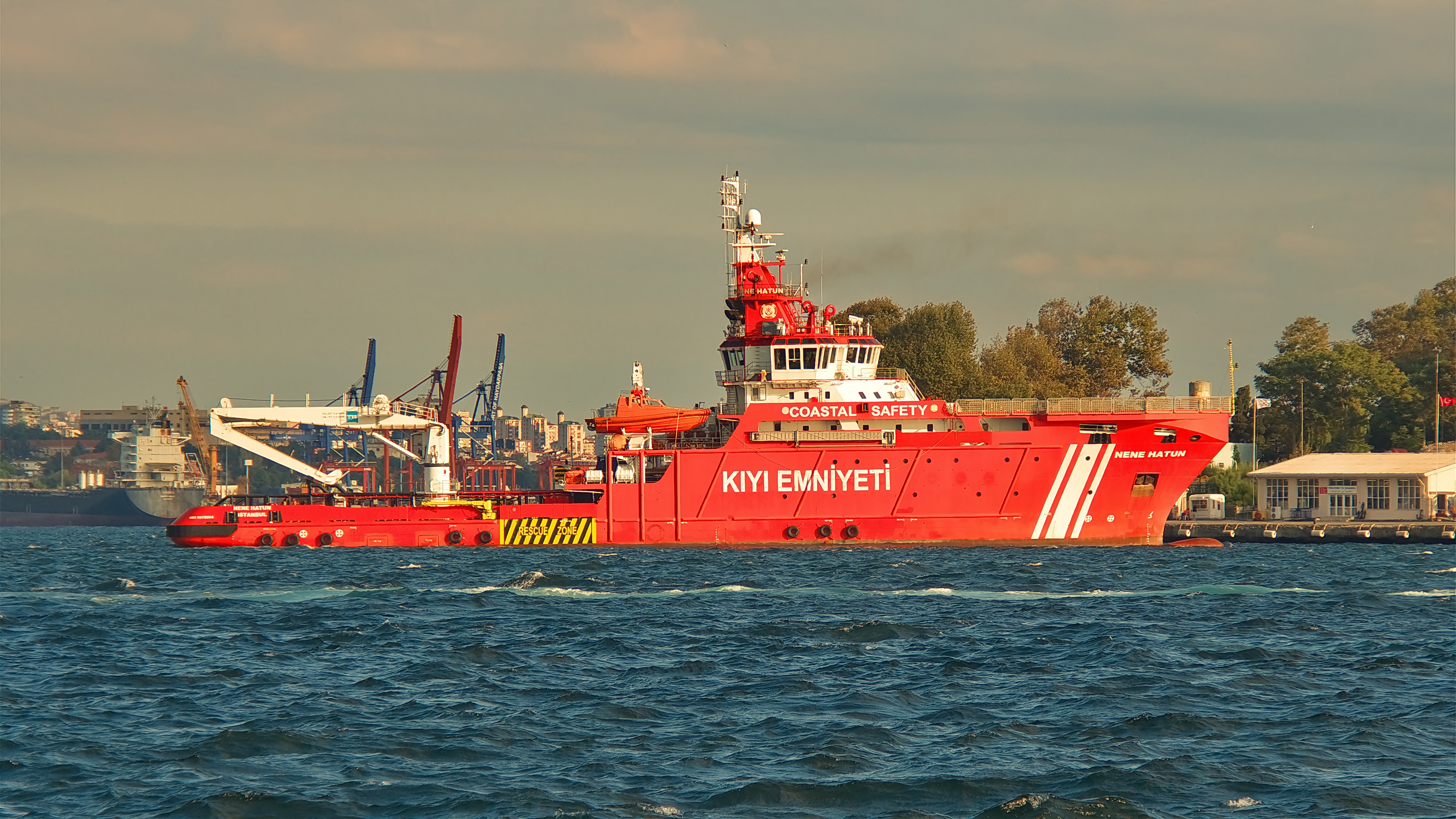
ERV Nene Hatun, Turkey's first emergency response vessel built at Sefine Shipyard in the last months of 2014.

Sefine Shipyard is capable of processing 40,000 tons of steel sheet annually. In the last ten years, 29 ships have been built at the shipyard, including tugboats, fireboats, salvage tugs for the Turkish Directorate General of Coastal Safety, an LPG carrier for Italy, car ferries for Estonia and Norway, a 18 MW icebreaker for Russia, and well-boats. Maintenance and repair services are done in dry and floating docks, mostly for domestic ships. Conversions of dry cargo ships to cement carriers is also carried out at the shipyard. In 2015, Sefine Shipyard delivered Turkey's first emergency response vessel, the ERV Nene Hatun to the Directorate General of Coastal Safety.

The shipyard also produces steel construction parts for bridges and viaducts, being part of the construction of the Osman Gazi Bridge and the new Istanbul Airport.

== Export business ==
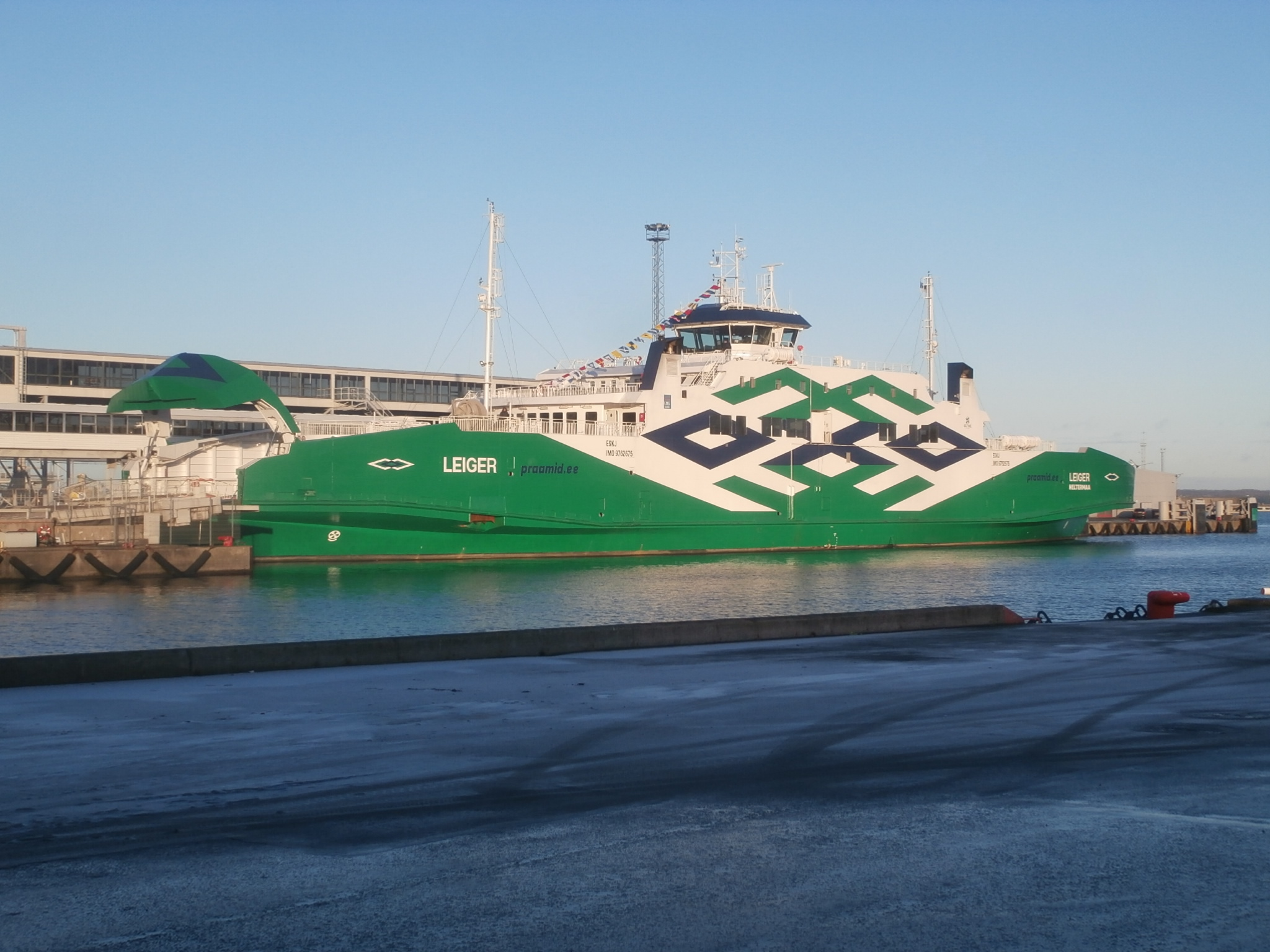
MF Leiger at the Port of Tallinn, Estonia (December 2016)

The 2014-ordered passenger/vehicle ferries MF Leiger and MF Tiiu of the Estonian TS Laevad were built in 2016. The MF Estonia 2016, a 114 m (374 ft)-long ferry with a capacity of 600 passengers and 150 vehicles, was built for the Port of Tallinn.

The 84.5 m (277 ft)-long ferry MF Sildafjord of the Norwegian Fjord1 ASA, which can carry 299 passengers and 83 vehicles, was launched in July 2019, and delivered in May 2020. Two more ferries, the MF Florøy and MF Hillefjord, were delivered to Fjord1 ASA early 2020.

In January 2021, the shipyard delivered the 84.40 m (276.9 ft)-long well-boat Aqua Skye, a fishing boat with the capability to store live fish and transport them, to the Norwegian DESS Aquaculture Shipping.

The 83 m (272 ft)-long well-boat Gåsø Høvding of the Norvegian Frøy was launched in January 2021.

The approximately 145 m (476 ft)-long 4.3 MW hybrid electric ferry MF Bastø Electric of the Norwegian Bastø Fosen, which can carry 600 passengers and 200 vehicles, was delivered in February 2021; it is an environmentally friendly ship with zero emissions.

In March 2021, another hybrid electric ferry of Bastø Fosen, the 54 m (177 ft)-long MF Svelvik for 100 passengers and 30 vehicles, was launched.

In 2021, the shipyard was awarded an order by the Italian Caronte and Tourist to build a 109.95 m (360.7 ft)-long SOLAS-compatible 8,300 GT LNG hybrid ro-pax ferry for 800 passengers and crew and 114 vehicles.

== Gallery ==
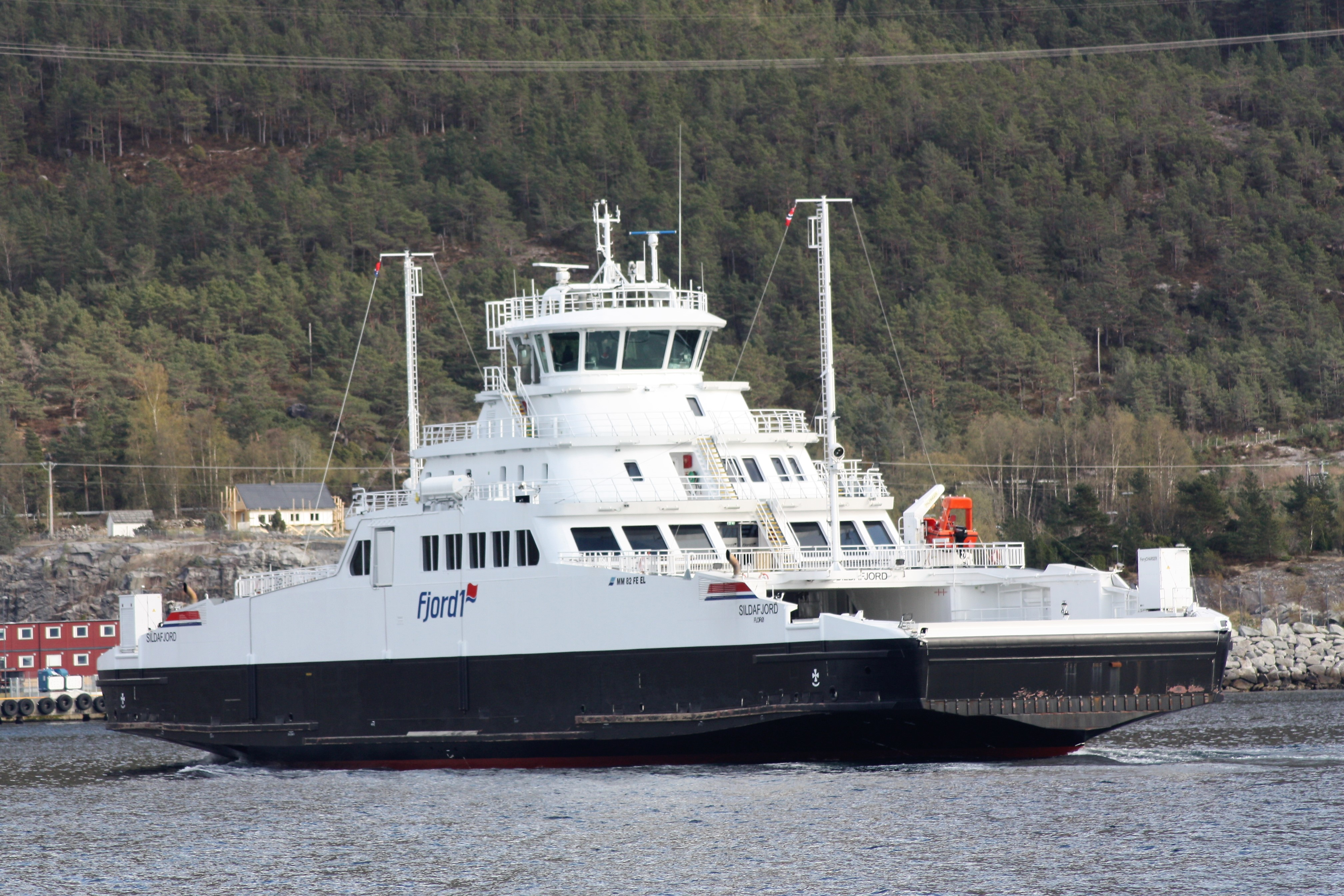
MF Sildafjord serving in Hardangerfjord, Norway (April 2021)

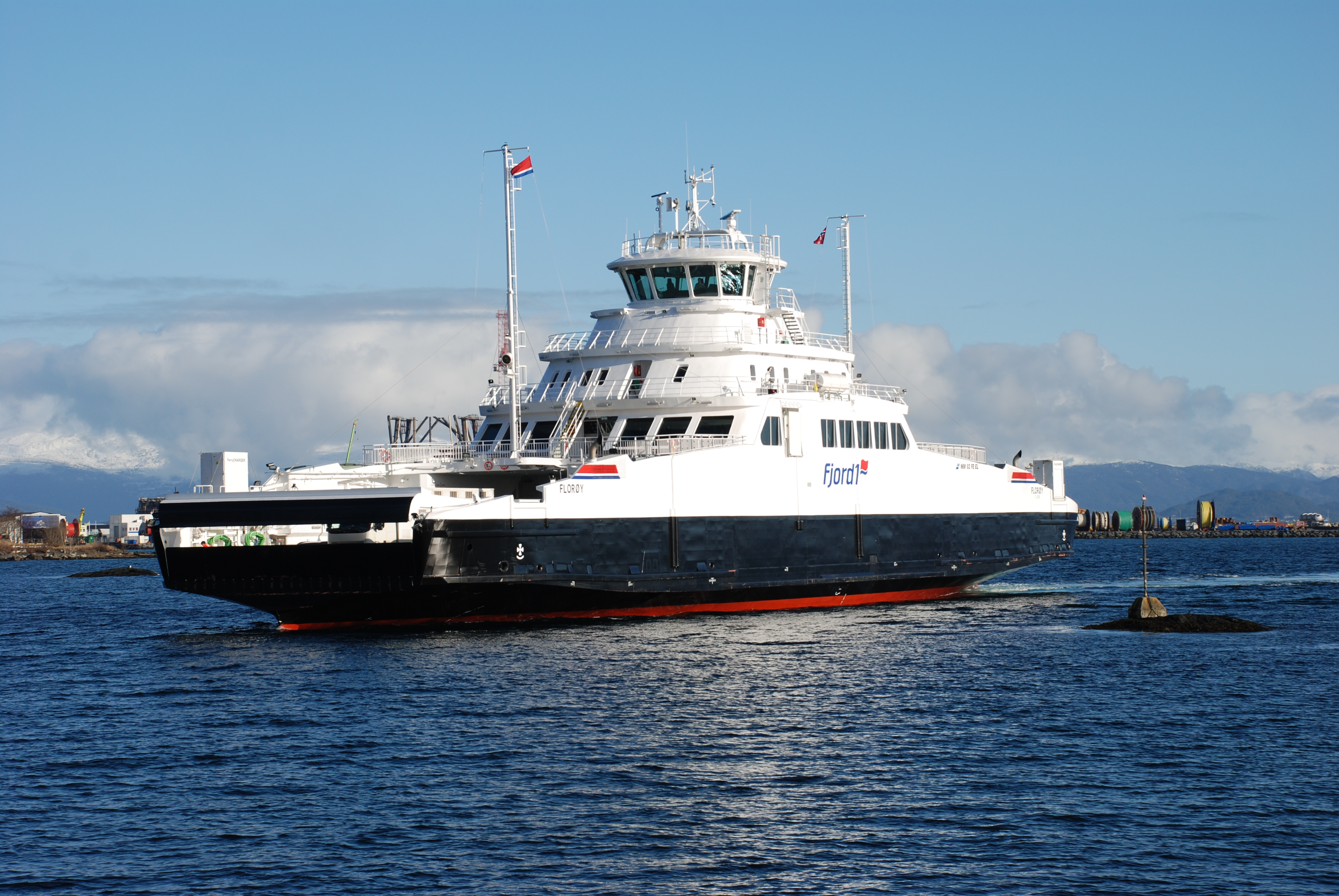
MF Florøy serving between Skjersholmane and Ranavik, Norway (February 2020)

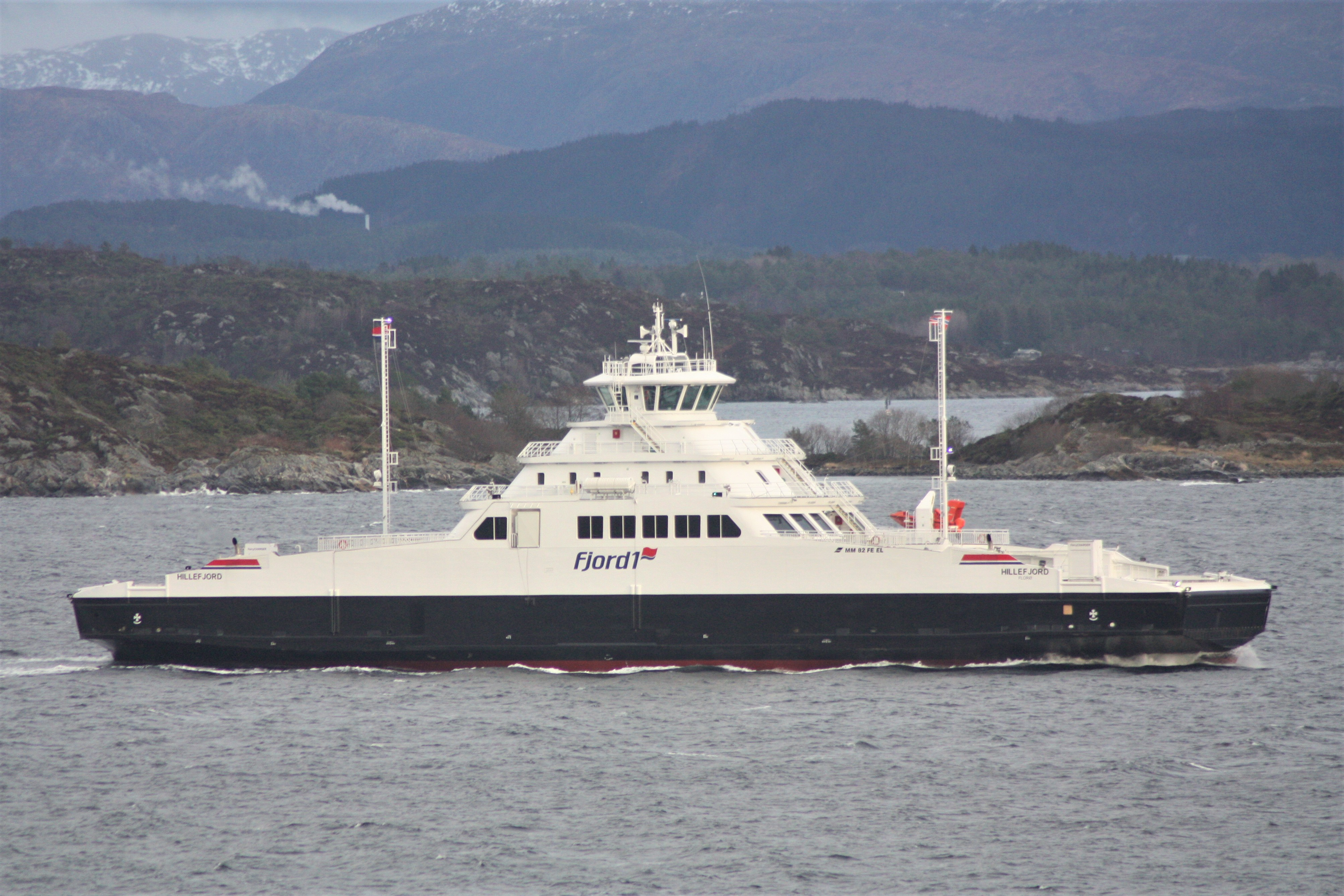
MF Hillefjord serving Korsfjorden, Norway (December 2019)

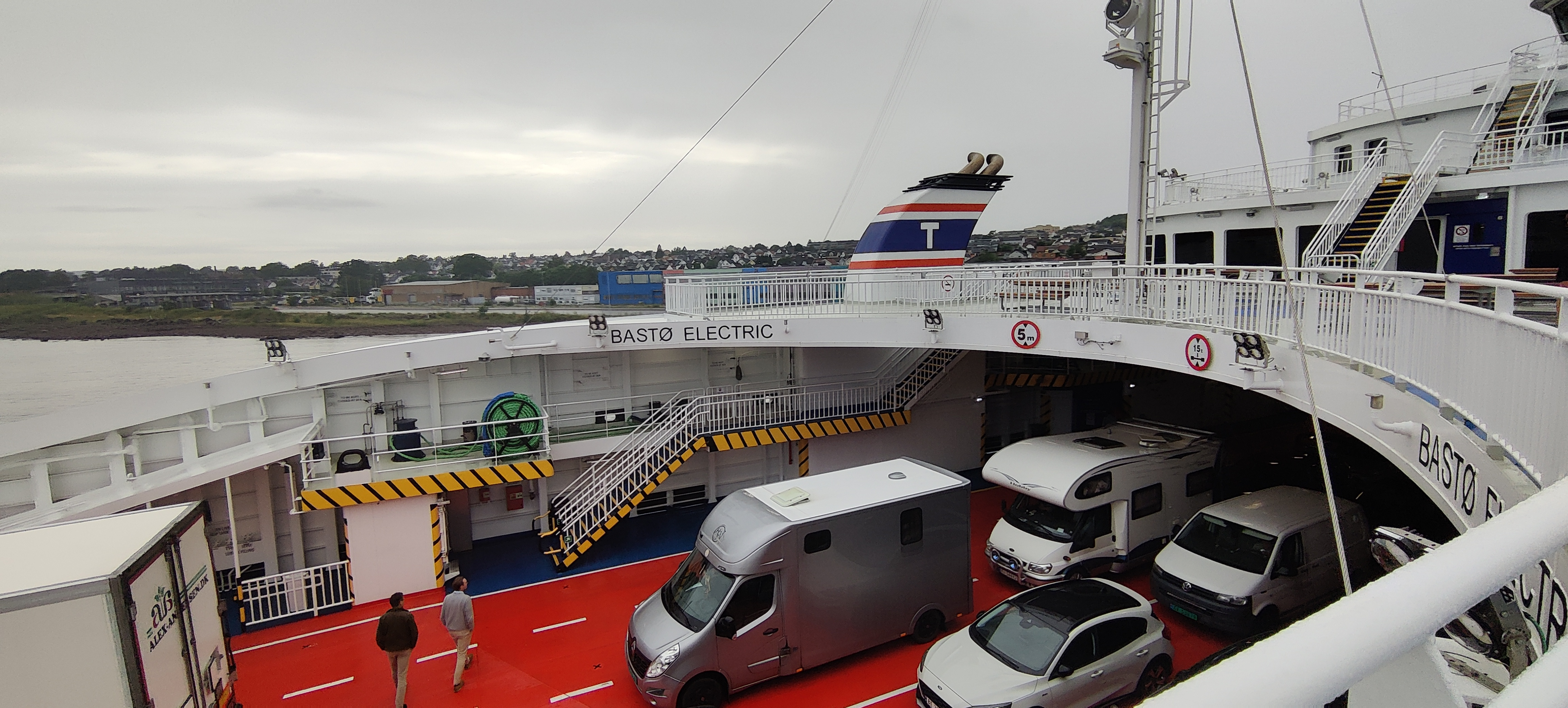
MF Bastø Electric serving in Horten, Norway (July 2021)
