= 1956 in Turkey =

- Centuries: 20th; 21st
- Decades: 1930s; 1940s; 1950s; 1960s; 1970s
- See also: List of years in Turkey

Events in the year 1956 in Turkey.

== Parliament ==
- 10th Parliament of Turkey

== Incumbents ==
- President – Celal Bayar
- Prime Minister – Adnan Menderes
- Leader of the opposition – İsmet İnönü

== Ruling party and the main opposition ==
- Ruling party – Democrat Party (DP)
- Main opposition – Republican People's Party (CHP)

== Cabinet ==
- 22nd government of Turkey

== Events ==
- 20 February – The magnitude 5.8 Eskişehir earthquake affected the area with a maximum Mercalli intensity of VIII (Severe), causing moderate damage and four deaths.
- 23 February – Polemics in the parliament concerning the 6/7 September 1955 event (Istanbul pogrom)
- 1 March – In Istanbul the previously common seat of the governor and the mayor was split
- 8 April – Opening date of Seyhan Dam and hydroelectric plant, the biggest plant (in 1950s)
- 10 April – 625 metres (2,051 ft) Birecik Bridge over the Fırat River in service
- 8 July – Three opposition parties issued a common statement
- 26 October – Turkey joined the International Atomic Energy Agency IAEA
- 15 November – Middle East Technical University is founded in Ankara.

== Births ==
- 1 January – Mehdi Eker, government minister
- 6 February – Nazan Öncel, singer
- 9 February – Oktay Vural, politician
- 1 May – Coşkun Aral, journalist
- 1 June – İdris Naim Şahin, former government minister
- 8 July – Meral Akşener, vice speaker of the parliament
- 24 July – Mehmet Ali Aydınlar, former president of the Turkish Football Federation

== Deaths ==
- 12 January – Cahit Sıtkı Tarancı (born in 1910), poet
- 18 January – Makbule Atadan (born in 1885), Atatürk’s sister
- 21 March – Hatı Çırpan (born in 1890), first female villager MP
- 15 July – Cemil Cahit Toydemir (born in 1883), a retired general who participated in the Turkish War of Independence
- 7 December – Reşat Nuri Güntekin (born in 1889), novelist
- 26 December – Ercüment Ekrem Talu (born in 1886), journalist

== Gallery ==
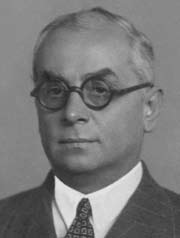
Celal Bayar

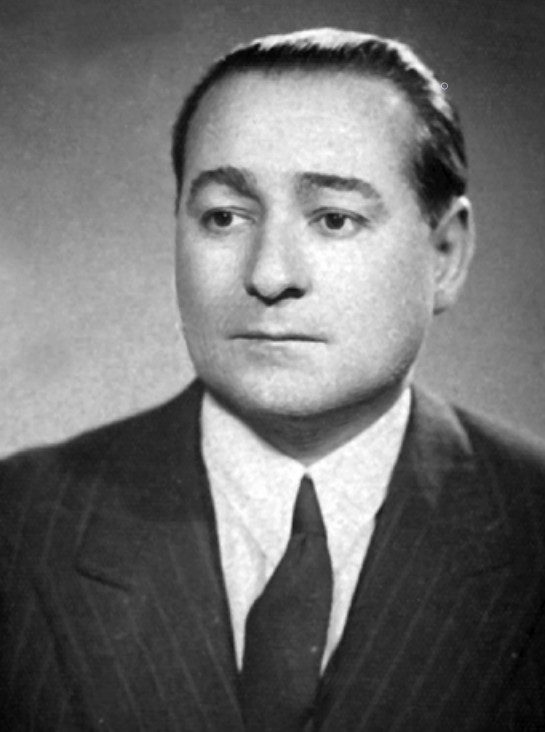
Adnan Menderes

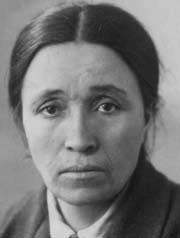
Hatı Çırpan

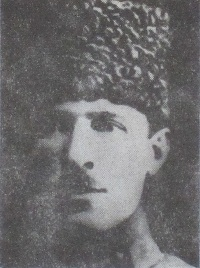
Cemil Cahit Toydemir

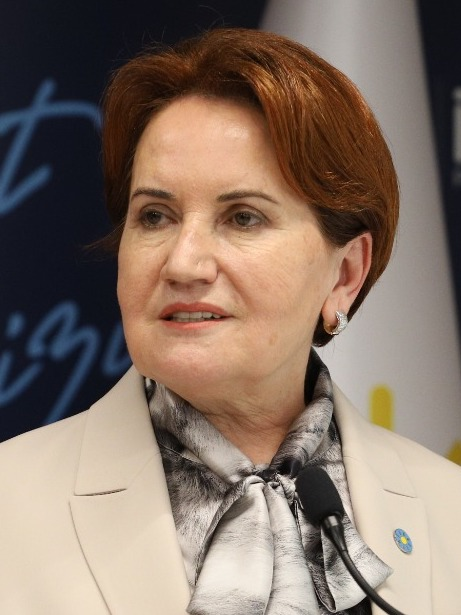
Meral Akşener

== See also ==
- Turkey at the 1956 Summer Olympics
- Turkey at the 1956 Winter Olympics
