= 1958 in Turkey =

- Centuries: 20th; 21st
- Decades: 1930s; 1940s; 1950s; 1960s; 1970s
- See also: List of years in Turkey

Events in the year 1958 in Turkey.

== Parliament ==
- 11th Parliament of Turkey

== Incumbents ==
- President – Celal Bayar
- Prime Minister – Adnan Menderes
- Leader of the opposition – İsmet İnönü

== Ruling party and the main opposition ==
- Ruling party – Democrat Party (DP)
- Main opposition – Republican People's Party (CHP)

== Cabinet ==
- 23rd government of Turkey

== Events ==
- 16 January – Nine army officers arrested for plotting against the government.
- 1 March – Commuter boat Üsküdar sinks. Most of the passengers were students.
- 2 June – Publication ban on the statements made by İsmet İnönü, the opposition leader
- 7 June – Series of public demonstrations concerning Cyprus dispute begin.
- 20 July – Partial mobilization after the revolution in Iraq

== Deaths ==
- 3 January – Cafer Tayyar Eğilmez (born in 1877), former general
- 25 January – Cemil Topuzlu (born in 1868), one of the pioneers of modern medicine
- 10 February – Nezihe Muhiddin, female activist, journalist
- 28 February – Zeki Üngör (born in 1880), musician
- 15 July – Cemil Cahit Toydemir (born in 1883), former government minister (15th government of Turkey)
- 1 November – Yahya Kemal Beyatlı (born in 1884), poet

== Births ==
- 9 January – Mehmet Ali Ağca, assassin
- 16 January – Ayşenur İslam, government minister
- 1 April – Banu Alkan, actress
- 6 May – Haluk Ulusoy, the former president of Turkish Football Federation
- 9 August – Muazzez Ersoy (Hatice Yıldız Levent), singer
- 11 September- Altan Tan, writer

== Gallery ==
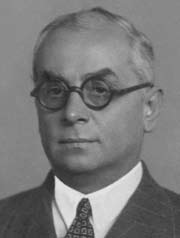
Celal Bayar

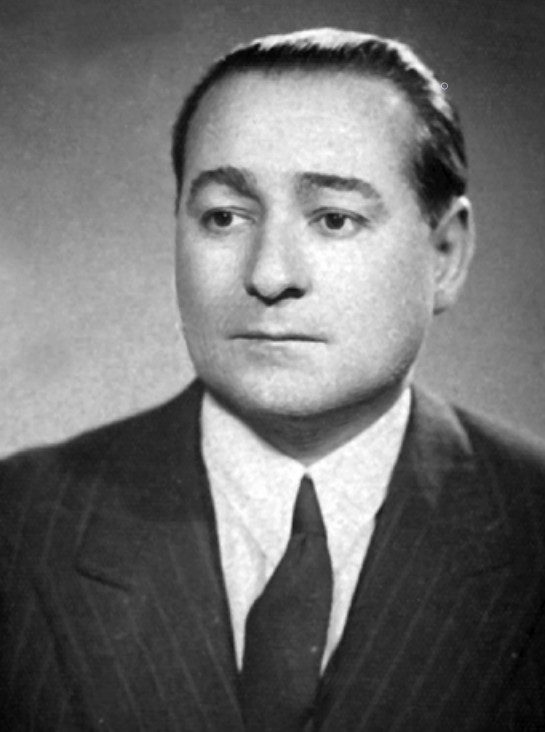
Adnan Menderes

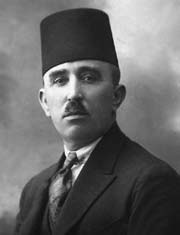
Cafer Tayyar Eğilmez

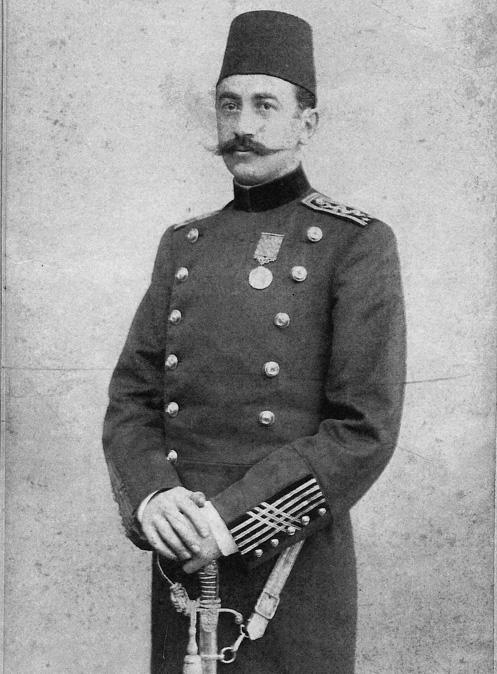
Cemil Topuzlu

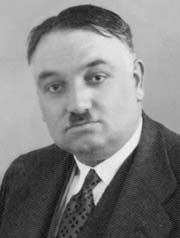
Yahya Kemal Beyatlı
