= ERV Nene Hatun =

Turkish emergency response vessel

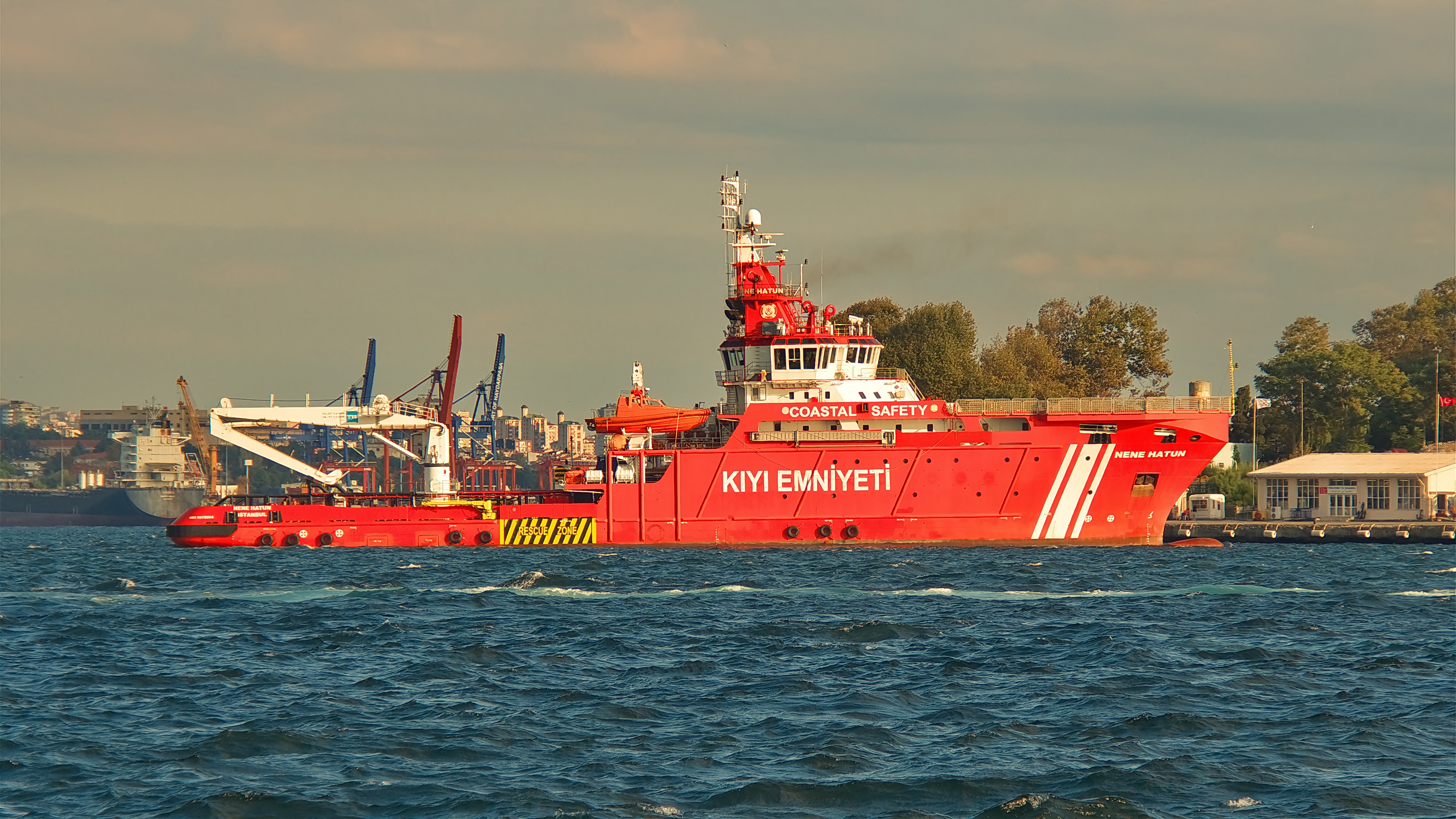
- ERV Nene Hatun at Istanbul in 2018.

History

Turkey
- Name: Nene Hatun
- Namesake: Nene Hatun (1857–1955)
- Owner: Directorate General of Coastal Safety
- Operator: Directorate General of Coastal Safety
- Builder: Sefine Shipyard
- Cost: €31.140 million
- Launched: 24 October 2014
- In service: 27 May 2015; 10 years ago
- Identification: IMO number: 9675004; MMSI number: 271044031; Callsign: TCA3371

General characteristics
- Type: Rescue and salvage ship
- Tonnage: 4,291 GT; 1,287 DWT
- Length: 87.80 m (288 ft 1 in)
- Beam: 19.50 m (64 ft 0 in)
- Height: 8.70 m (28 ft 7 in)
- Draft: 7.40 m (24 ft 3 in)
- Installed power: 4 x 4,500 kW (6,000 hp) (Hyundai 9H 32/40), total 18,000 kW (24,000 hp)
- Speed: 18 knots (33 km/h; 21 mph) max
- Range: 5,375 nmi (9,954 km; 6,185 mi)
- Capacity: 20 passengers
- Crew: 45

ERV Nene Hatun is a rescue and salvage ship, Turkey's first emergency response vessel (ERV). Owned and operated by the Directorate General of Coastal Safety, she was built in Yalova, launched in 2014, and commissioned in 2015.

== History ==
The vessel was built for the Directorate General of Coastal Safety at Sefine Shipyard in Altınova, Yalova Province, Turkey. She was named Nene Hatun (1857–1955), a Turkish folk heroine, who became known for fighting in the Russo-Turkish War of 1877–1878, Costing €31.14 million, she was launched with a ceremony held on 24 October 2014. She was commissioned on 27 May 2015. She is the first emergency response vessel of Turkey.

== Characteristics ==
Nene Hatun has an overall length of 87.80 metres (288 ft 1 in) , a beam of 19.50 m (64 ft 0 in), is 8.70 m (28 ft 7 in) high and has a draft of 7.40 m (24 ft 3 in). She is powered by four Hyundai 9H 32/40 engines with 4,500 kW (6,000 hp). The total installed power is 18,000 kW (24,000 hp). She features an emergency generator MAN D2842LE201 of 528 kW (708 hp). The vessel has maximum speed of 18 knots (33 km/h; 21 mph) and a cruise speed of 16 knots (30 km/h; 18 mph), and a range of 5,375 nautical miles (9,954 km; 6,185 mi). She is operated by a crew of 45, and is capable of accommodating up to 20 other persons.

The vessel's services are marine salvage, towing up to 205.4 t (202.2 long tons; 226.4 short tons), fire fighting (FiFi III), diving Services, dynamic positioning (Kongsberg DP2) services, victim accommodation, marine pollution detection and fighting, marine pollution analysis, helicopter service, offshore control and command as well as stand-by service at all weather and sea conditions. The ship's emergency care hospital has 20 beds.

Equipped with an external fire fighting system of class FiFi III, she can throw water up to 150 m (490 ft) distance from the vessel, to a height of 70 m (230 ft) on three monitors at 10,000 m^{3}/h (350,000 cu ft/h) water flow rate. The deck crane's safe working load (SWL) is 12.5 t. She is able to carry up to 1,000 m^{3} (35,000 cu ft) boom containment oil spill. Her landing deck allows the landing and take-off of helicopters with weights up to 11 tons.

== Service history ==
As of mid 2021, Nene Hatun had accomplished 25 total operations of diverse nature from her commissioning in 2015.

On 28 January 2021, she participated in a salvage operation for MV Petra Star, a Russian bulk carrier in ballast en route from Istanbul to Port Kavkaz, which ran aground due to engine failure in stormy weather conditions at the northern end of Istanbul Strait in the Black Sea. By March, it was announced that the emergency response ship was ready to take part in the salvage operation for the container ship Ever Given, which blocked the Suez Canal after grounding. By early August, she was deployed from Istanbul to the Ören neighborhood of the Milas district in Muğla Province, southwestern Turkey, where ongoing wildfires jeopardized the Yeniköy power station. She was moored 300 m (980 ft) offshore to intervene when necessary.

== See also ==
- Safeguard-class rescue and salvage ship
- Geo Barents
- Da Wu-class rescue and salvage ship
