= Nene Hatun =

Turkish folk heroine

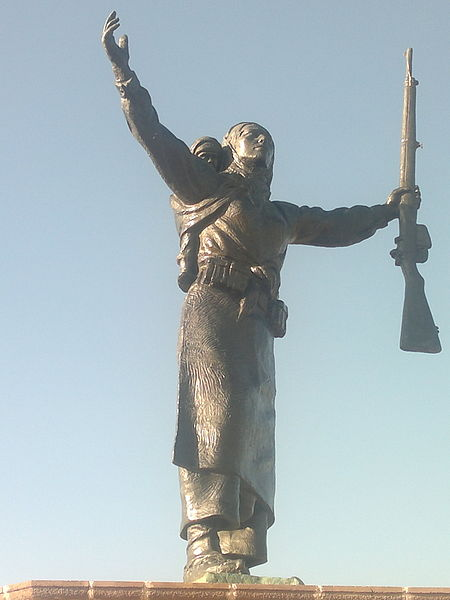
- Statue of Nene Hatun by Metin Yurdanur at Aziziye Fort in Erzurum.
- Born: 1857; Erzurum, Ottoman Empire
- Died: 22 May, 1955 (aged 97–98); Erzurum, Turkey
- Burial place: Aziziye Fort, Erzurum
- Military career
- Allegiance: Ottoman Empire
- Service years: 1877–78
- Nickname: Nene Hatun
- Conflicts: Russo-Turkish War (1877–78)

Nene Hatun (1857 – 22 May 1955), surnamed Kırkgöz after 1934, was a Turkish folk heroine, who became known for fighting against Russian forces during the recapture of Fort Aziziye in Erzurum from Russian forces at the start of the Russo-Turkish War of 1877–1878.

== Turkish historiography ==
According to Turkish folklore, she had been living in a neighborhood of Erzurum called Aziziye that was close to an important fortification defending the city. On the night of 7 November 1877, Nene Hatun's older brother Hasan, who returned home badly wounded, died. Fort Aziziye was captured by the Russian army on the evening of 9 November. In the morning when the news of the Russian capture of Fort of Aziziye was heard, she kissed her dead brother's head and took an oath to avenge his death. She left her newborn baby girl and 3 year old son, Yusuf, at home, joining the counterattack against Aziziye with her dead brother's rifle and her hatchet. The counter-attack was launched by Turkish civilians who were mostly women and elderly men armed with axes and farming equipment. Hundreds of Turkish civilians were killed by Russian gunfire but their numbers were so overwhelming they managed to enter the fortifications by breaking down its iron doors. A hand-to-hand fight ended with around 2,000 Russian soldiers being killed and the rest routed. Nene Hatun was found unconscious, wounded and her bloodied hands still firmly grasping her hatchet. She was singled out for her heroism and would become a symbol of bravery.

== Later life ==
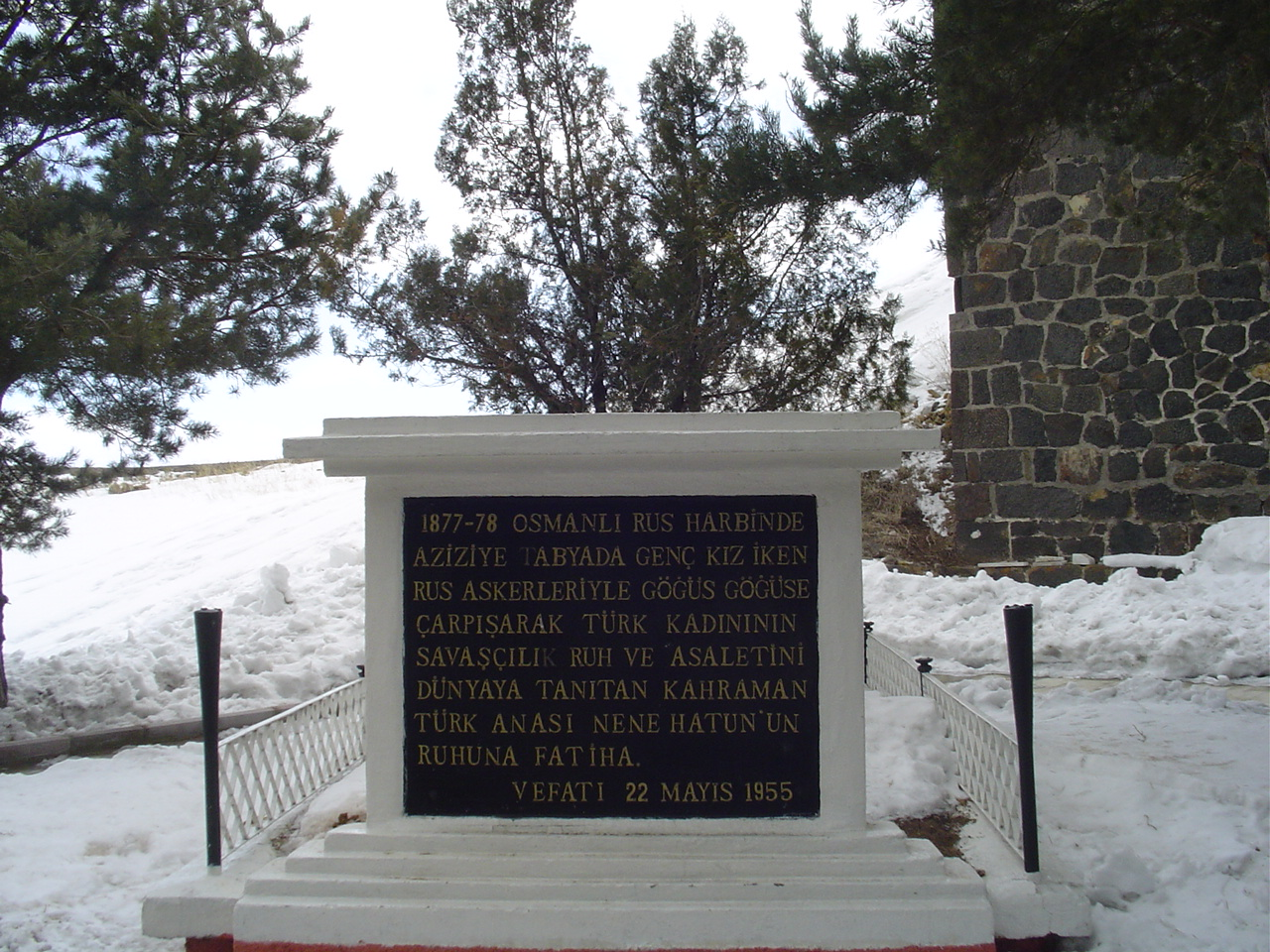
Grave of Nene Hatun at Aziziye Fort in Erzurum

Nene Hatun lived the rest of her life in Aziziye. She lost her husband in the following years and her son Yusuf was killed in World War I during the battle of Gallipoli. In 1954 she was remembered as the last survivor of the Russo-Turkish War of 1877–1878 and was visited by General Baransel, commander of the 3rd Turkish army, and from then until her death she was known as the "Mother of the Third Army". She was named as "Mother of the Mothers" on the Mother's Day in 1955. She died of pneumonia on 22 May 1955 at the age of 98 and was laid to rest in the martyrs' cemetery at Fort Aziziye.

== Nene Hatun in film ==
Nene Hatun was depicted in the 1973 Turkish movie Gazi kadin (Nene hatun) starring Türkan Şoray and Kadir İnanır. Another movie titled Nene Hatun was released in 2010.

== See also ==
- ERV Nene Hatun, Turkey's first emergency response vessel built in Turkey in 2014
