= Vasily Geyman =

Russian lieutenant general

Vasily Alexandrovich Geyman
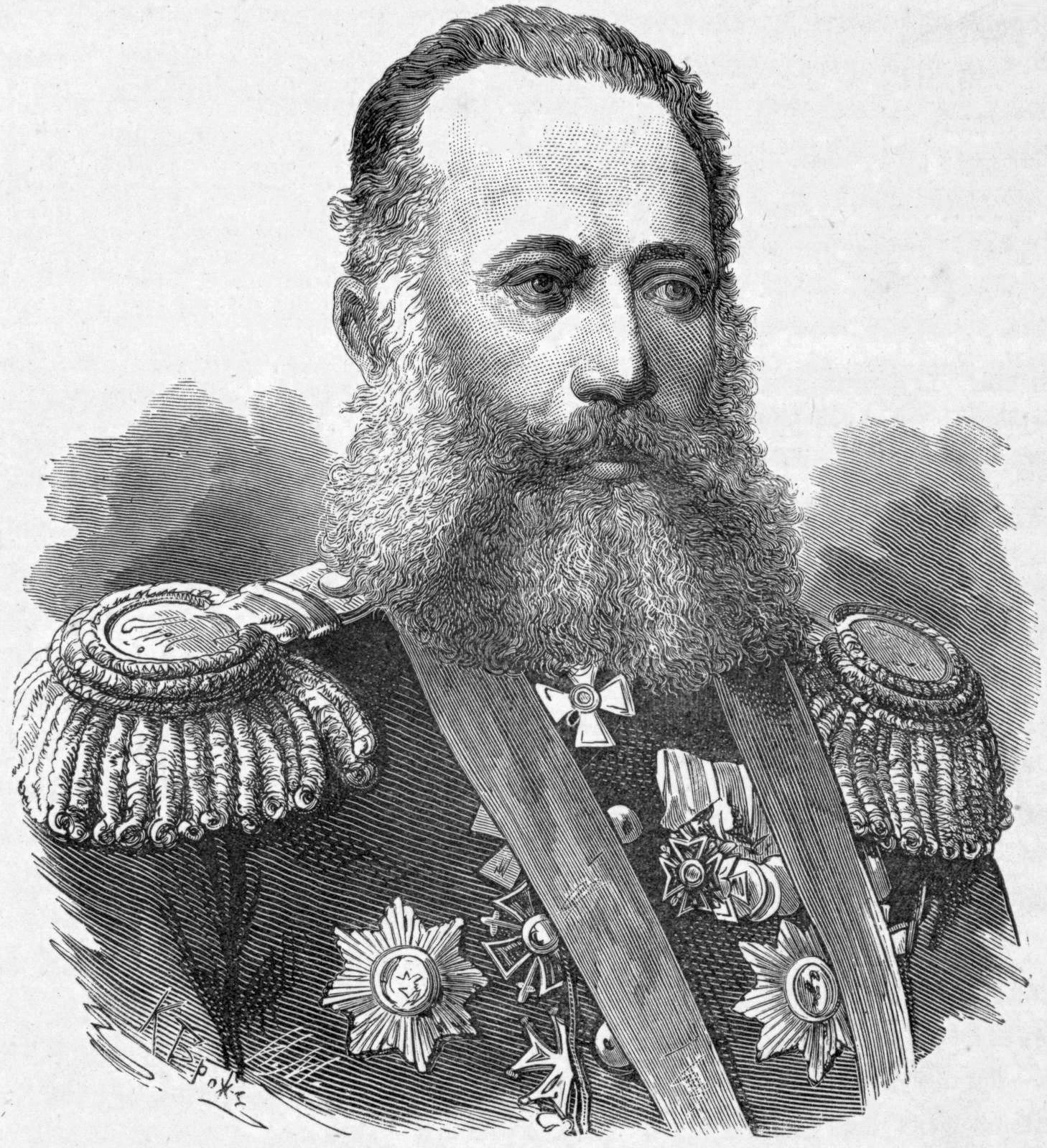
- Born: 1823; Kovno Governorate, Russian Empire
- Died: April 13, 1878 (aged 55); Kars, Erzurum Vilayet, Ottoman Empire
- Military career
- Allegiance: Russian Empire
- Branch: Imperial Russian Army
- Rank: Lieutenant General
- Commands: Sevastopol 75th Infantry Regiment; 20th Infantry Division
- Conflicts: Caucasian War; Battle of Dargo (WIA); Russo-Turkish War; Battle of Kars; Battle of Erzurum
- Awards: Order of St. George 2nd Class (12/11/1877); Order of St. George 3rd Class (04/19/1864); Order of St. Vladimir, 2nd class (1875); Order of St. Vladimir 3rd Class with swords (1862); Order of St. Vladimir 4th class with a bow (1851); Order of St. Anna 2nd Class (1851); Order of St. Anne 3rd class with swords and bow (1847); Order of St. Anna 4th Class (1845); Order of St. Stanislaus 2nd class with the imperial crown and swords (1859); Golden Weapon for Bravery, encoated with diamonds Order of the Red Eagle, 3rd class with swords (1863); Order of the Crown, 2nd Class (1863)

Vasily Aleksandrovich Geyman (1823–1878) was a Russian lieutenant general who was notable for his participation in the Caucasian War and the Russo-Turkish War.

== Biography ==
Vasily Geyman was born in 1823 in the Kovno Province. The son of a drummer. After graduating from the Grodno gymnasium, in 1839 he entered military service as a non-commissioned officer in the Nizhny Novgorod infantry regiment. Geyman was also Jewish by origin.

In 1842 he was transferred to the Caucasian line battalion No. 1, and in 1844 - the Caucasian line reserve battalion and soon after the length of service he was promoted to warrant officer .

In 1845 he was transferred to the 16th Georgian Line Battalion and attached to the Kabardian Infantry Regiment, and since then, for 20 years, his outstanding combat activities in the Caucasus have continued. Together with his regiment, he participated in almost all expeditions in Chechnya. During the expedition of Count Vorontsov to Dargo, he, being in the vanguard of General Belyavsky, distinguished himself in many cases and showed such fearlessness that Vorontsov called him the bravest of the officers of the Caucasian army. Geyman was wounded in one of these cases in the left shoulder with damage to the humerus; a successful operation saved his life, but since then he could not freely control his left hand and wore his hand in a wide black sling all his life. For the Dargin expedition, Geyman was awarded the rank of second lieutenant and the Order of Saint Anna, 4th Class. In 1846 and 1847, he continued to participate in cases against the highlanders, for the distinction in which he received the Order of St. Anna 3rd degree with swords and bow.

At the end of 1847 he was appointed a brigade adjutant. In 1848 he was promoted to lieutenant.

In 1849 he returned to the front and was appointed company commander. In 1851, already with the rank of staff captain, he received the Order of St. Anna 2nd degree and St. Vladimir 4th degree with a bow. In 1852 he was promoted to captain .

In 1854, he was appointed head of training for the lower ranks in target shooting and participated in several large cases with the highlanders, and on July 13 he was twice wounded by rifle bullets. In 1856 he was promoted to major and received riflemen under his command.

In 1857 he was a member of the Kumyk detachment and took an especially active part in the fight against the mountaineers: on January 19, he was during the capture of the village of Ali-Sultan-Kale from the battle, on March 19 - during the assault and occupation of the fortified position of the Goytemir Gate. On March 21, during the destruction of the village of Samgo-Yurt, on March 24 - during the capture of the villages of Masheil and Belnosha; for distinction in these matters he was awarded the Golden Weapon for Bravery.

In 1859 he received the rank of lieutenant colonel and the order of St. Stanislav 2nd degree with the imperial crown and swords.

When in 1860, after the capture of Shamil, the main actions were transferred to the right wing of the Caucasian line, Geyman was sent there at the head of the combined rifle battalion and the team of hunters of the Kabardin regiment.

During the occupation of the village of Shabanits, his battalion was among the troops of the first line, and during further movement to the upper reaches of the Ili River it was constantly in the vanguard. In early June, the Shapsug detachment, which included this battalion, moved to the Shabsh River; On June 7, when crossing it, two battalions of the Kabardin and Apsheron regiments marched in front, under the command of Geyman, withstood a very hot case and inflicted significant losses on the mountaineers. Then, as part of the Nizhne-Abadzekh detachment, the battalion of the Kabardin regiment under the command of Geyman participated in the establishment of Russian rule in the region and the ousting of the highlanders.

At the end of 1861, Geyman was promoted to colonel and appointed commander of the 75th Sevastopol Infantry Regiment, which was also among the troops of the right wing.

At the end of April 1862, he, commanding the Nizhne-Abadzekh detachment, skillfully performed difficult and dangerous operations to capture the Dakhovsky gorge, after which he was left there to set up a new Cossack village. The work on the construction of the Dakhovskaya stanitsa, which lasted until July 12, was worth tremendous labor and subjected the troops to hourly meetings with the enemy. On July 18, Geyman raided the valley of the Rufabgo River and destroyed a large aul with all the grain reserves collected there. On September 25, General Evdokimov, who commanded the troops of the right wing, arrived at the Dakhovsky detachment and made a move with it to the Kurdzhips River. Military actions in the basins of the Belaya, Pshekha and Kurdzhypsa rivers ended at the end of 1862 by the capture of the village of Khamyshi. In the same year, Geyman was awarded the Order of St. Vladimir 3rd degree with swords.

In the second half of January 1863, the Dakhovsky detachment was instructed to occupy the upper reaches of the Kurdzhips and cut down a clearing and, despite the stubborn resistance of the mountaineers, successfully completed it: by February 8, the clearing was completed. On February 27, Geyman moved to the ridge along the Tlotz River to meet the new commander-in-chief, Grand Duke Mikhail Nikolaevich . This movement was accompanied by heated affairs with the enemy who was pressing on the detachment. Having successfully repelled the attacks of the Highlanders, Geyman on March 5 reached the village of Kurdzhipskaya and introduced himself to the Grand Duke, and on the 7th, returned to the Dakhovskaya village. Then, during 1863, Geyman's detachment, moving in different directions, climbed into the most impassable places.

For the expeditions of 1862–1863, Geyman, at the suggestion of their participant, Prince Albrecht of Prussia, was awarded the Prussian Order of the Red Eagle of the 3rd degree with swords and the Order of the Crown of the 2nd degree.

At the beginning of 1864, before the opening of the main actions against the tribes of the southern slope of the Caucasian ridge, it was ordered to all the detachments to once again pass through different nooks of the northern highland region and drive out the hostile natives from there in order to finally secure their rear.

Geyman, promoted to major general for distinction in 1863, acted at the head of the Dakhovsky detachment with the same art and on April 19, 1864, was awarded the Order of St. George 3rd Art. No. 508

As a reward for the excellent courage and exemplary management shown in the case with the Ubykhs on March 18 between Psezuape and Shakhe and during the occupation of the entire sea coast to the Sochi River.

In December 1865, he was appointed assistant chief of the 21st Infantry Division, in 1866 he was assistant commander of the troops of the Kuban region, in 1867, he was head of the Sukhum department, in 1872 he was promoted to lieutenant general with the appointment first to be at the disposal of the August commander-in-chief, and then commander of the 20th Infantry Division.

In 1875 he was awarded the Order of St. Vladimir of the 2nd degree. In 1875– 1876 years, Geyman filed Grand Duke Mikhail Nikolayevich a note that were titled "Military considerations in case of war with Turkey from the Caucasus", "The military review of the Sukhumi region" and in 1874 "Military measures to ensure peace in the Terek and Dagestan regions".

=== Russo-Turkish War ===
When the Russian-Turkish War began, Geyman was with the army operating in Western Armenia and commanded the crossing of the river. Arpa right column. On April 28, 1877, he was entrusted with a special detachment for operations near Ardahan. On May 5, during the decisive assault on the fortress, he commanded a column that stormed the fortifications of Kaz-Tapesi and Singer, and by his own example he inspired the troops. The assault columns marched with banners and music unfurled, hiding behind rifle chains, first used in the Caucasian army. The reward for the storming of Ardahan, which made Geyman's name famous, was a golden sword adorned with diamonds.

When concentrating the main forces to Kars, Geyman was ordered to move with a part of them to the southwestern outskirts of the fortress, get acquainted with the area for imposing Kars from the west and choose a position from which, if necessary, it would be possible to advance towards the Turkish troops coming from Saganlug; The position was successfully chosen near the village of Kogaly, but due to changed considerations, the main forces of Geyman's detachment were transferred to Aravartan to get closer to the rest of the troops, which were to begin the Battle of Kars. On May 27, Geyman undertook a reconnaissance of the Shorakh heights and alarmed the Turks, who believed that our troops were marching on an attack, on June 3, Geyman's forces repulsed the Ottoman attack on the Aravartan camp with significant damage, and on June 6 was sent with a detachment to Saganlug to distract Ahmed Muhtar Pasha, who was moving with large forces to the Erivan detachment of Tergukasov . An attempt, by order of Mikhail Loris-Melikov, to seize on June 13 the Zevin position, at which Mukhtar Pasha stopped, ended in complete failure. On June 23, Geyman's detachment joined the main forces and with them retreated from Kars. On July 16, a significant column under the command of Geyman staged a demonstration against the army of Mukhtar Pasha, located in the Aladzhin Heights, which led to a battle with moderately high temperatures, after which Geyman's troops retreated to Kyuryuk-Dara. On August 6, with a new intensified demonstration against the position of the main Turkish army at Aladzha, Geyman commanded the middle column.

From September 20, he took a prominent part in the battles of Aladzha, and on October 3 he captured Avliar, one of the most important points of the enemy's position, and thereby contributed to the defeat of the Turkish army in the Avliar-Aladzhin battle. On October 5, Geyman resumed the blockade of Kars . Sent on October 10 with a special detachment to pursue Ahmed Mukhtar Pasha, Geyman could not catch up with him and prevent him from uniting with Ishmael Pasha. This campaign presented extreme difficulties on the off-road and extreme roughness of the terrain. Within 7 1/2 days, Geyman's troops traveled 174 miles. Joining up with Tergukasov's detachment on October 16, Geyman took Hasan-Kala from the battle.On October 23, he attacked Mukhtar Pasha and Ishmael Pasha at positions near Deve Boynu, on the Erzurum road, and defeated them, but slowed down in pursuit and gave the Turks time to recover, as a result of which he failed to storm the Erzurum fortifications on the night of October 29, Geyman decided to immediately repeat the assault, but abandoned this idea due to the lack of shells, the extreme fatigue of the soldiers and the decline of health conditions among the ranks.

On November 12, 1877, Geyman was awarded the Order of St. George 2nd degree No. 109

For the difference shown during the capture of the Kars fortress on the night of November 5–6, 1877.

Meanwhile, a prolonged blockade of Erzurum began at the most unfavorable time of the year. An epidemic of typhus appeared in the troops, which continued after the cleansing of Erzurum by the Turks and the occupation of it by the Russian troops on the basis of the peace concluded on February 19, 1878, Geyman, who died in Kars on April 13, 1878, also became a victim of it .

His older brother, Mikhail Alexandrovich, also served in the Caucasus for a long time, was the regimental head-doctor of the Kabardian infantry regiment; died in 1866.

Gaiman was distinguished by outstanding courage and a passionate love for military affairs, but the desire to attack with a bang, insufficient reconnaissance and a certain disdain for the enemy were sometimes the reason for failure. The Caucasian army inspired him some innovations in the drill regulations with attacking with chains. Contemporaries compared him to Blücher in his fiery combat nature and in the respect he had for military science.

In the "Caucasian Collection" (No. 3, 1879), Gaiman's memoirs about the Dargin expedition of 1845 were published (republished in the collection "Dargin tragedy. 1845". St. Petersburg, 2001). He placed several articles and notes in the " Military Collection " and "Russky Invalid".

In 2017, in the province of Ardahan, the remains of a Russian officer were found, which, according to preliminary assumptions, could belong to General Gaiman. However, the examination established that the remains belong to the lieutenant colonel of the Russian Imperial Army Karl Karlovich Rzhepetskiy.

=== Family ===
Gaiman was the great-uncle of Colonel General of the Luftwaffe Alexander Löhr.

== Bibliography ==
- Gaiman, Vasily Alexandrovich // Military encyclopedia : [in 18 volumes] / ed. VF Novitsky ... [ and others ]. - SPb.; [ M. ]: Type. t-va I. D. Sytin, 1911–1915.
- Gaiman, Vasily Alexandrovich // Russian biographical dictionary : in 25 volumes. - SPb. - M., 1896–1918.
- Dargin tragedy. 1845 Memoirs of the participants in the Caucasian War of the 19th century. - SPb., 2001.
- V._A._Geyman. Heroes and Figures of the Russian-Turkish War 1877-1878. pp. 67–72.
