= Sinan Alaağaç =

Turkish footballer (1960–1985)

Sinan Alaağaç (14 May 1960 – 24 November 1985) was a football goalkeeper of Eskişehirspor who died in pre-season training due to heart attack. He is commemorated yearly in Eskişehir on the anniversary of his death.
