= Ikram Dinçer =

Turkish politician (born 1959)

İkram Dinçer (born April 10, 1959) is a Turkish politician.

He is a member of the Justice and Development Party. He was elected to Parliament in the 2007 general election as a deputy for Van for the 23rd legislative term. He is married and has three children.
