= Directorate General of Coastal Safety =

Directorate General of Coastal Safety Kıyı Emniyeti Genel Müdürlüğü
- Common name: Kıyı Emniyet
- Abbreviation: KEGM

Agency overview
- Formed: 1997
- Preceding agencies: Turkey Maritime Authority; Radio Operation Directorate

Jurisdictional structure
- National agency: Turkey
- Operations jurisdiction: Turkey

Operational structure
- Elected officer responsible: Efkan Ala, Interior Minister
- Agency executive: Yaşar Duran Aytaç, General Director
- Parent agency: Ministry of Transport and Infrastructure

Website
- http://www.kiyiemniyeti.gov.tr/Index.aspx

The Directorate General of Coastal Safety (DGCS, Turkish: Kıyı Emniyeti Genel Müdürlüğü, KEGM) has been established by the Turkish Republic Council Of Ministers’ decision on 12 May 1997 as a General Directorate and state owned Organization.

== History ==
It was the first time to establish a lighthouse within the Turkish coasts in 1856’s. After the signing of franchise agreement at that time made between Ottoman State and French, lighthouse services were managed under the name of “General Management of Lighthouses Administration” and then Lighthouses Administration was purchased by the Government by resolution 3302 and assigned to Denizbank on 01.01.1938.

It has been abolished from Denizbank on 30 June 1939 by resolution 3633 and assigned to the General Directorate of State Ports and Maritime Lines Administration.

Upon abolishing of General Management of State Ports by resolution of 4517 and charging to the Directorate General of State Ports and Maritime Lines Administration, Coastal Safety Administration was assigned to this institution called Lighthouses and Lifesaving.

General Directorate of State Maritime Lines Administration was abolished on 1.3.1966 by resolution 5842 and assigned to the Maritime Bank T.A.O and identified as an Administration managed by the Bank mentioned.

Maritime Bank T.A.O was started to be called as TUDEK (Turkish Maritime Institution) on 10.10.1983 by the Council of Ministers with resolution 2680 dated 17.6.1983 and this banking became a separate General Directorate as a tied partnership .

Turkish Maritime Institution became TDI( Turkish Maritime Administrations) by decree law 233 dated 8.6.1984 and Shipyards were aggregated in a different General Management.

General Directorate of Coastal Safety and Salvage Administrations, that all AtoN, salvage and lifeboat services being aggregated under the same structure, was established by the cabinet decision of 97/9466 dated 12.5.1997 and has become a separate General Directorate.

There are currently 507 ATON's including 417 lighthouses with different type and specifications in our Turkish coasts.

== Mission ==
The mission of the foundation is to assist and improve the safety of navigation in Turkish waters.

The organization’s core competences are:

- Search and rescue
- Salvage and towage
- Turkish Straits Vessel Traffic Services (TSVTS)
- Aids to navigation (lighthouses, buoys, differential GPS, Radio direction finder, etc.)
- Marine communication
- Marine oil spill response during salvage operations or in case of emergency.

== Services ==
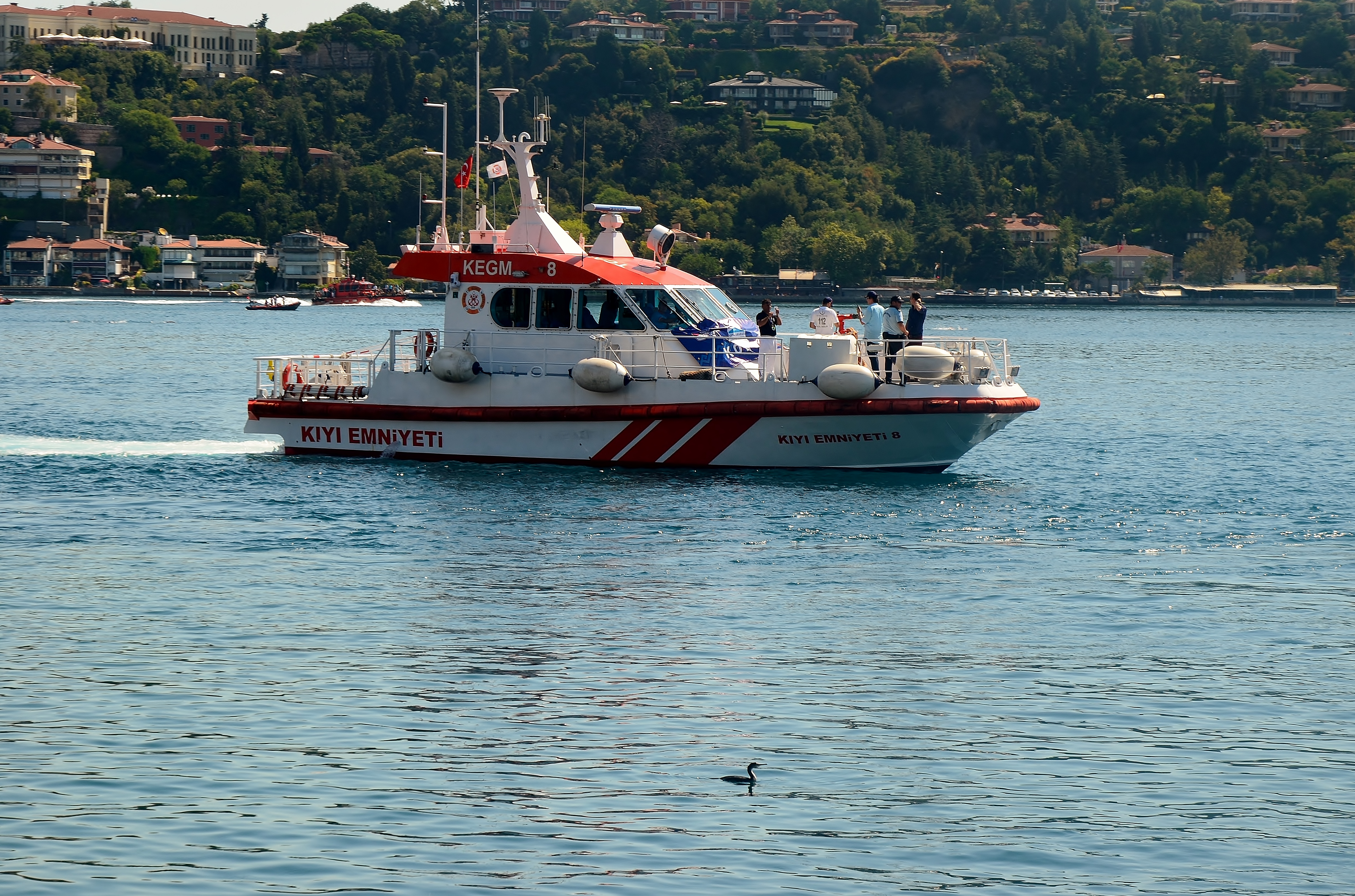
Patrol boat on the Bosphorus

=== Salvage and Rescue ===
Rescue services of DGCS are well organized within Turkish Straits by having 15 well equipped Rescue Stations. ( 8 of them are Boat Stations and 7 of them are Shore Based Rescue Stations)

Professional Rescue Teams wathckeep at the stations for 24 hours a day / 7 days a week. They listen to the sectors' VHF channel of the Turkish Straits Vessel Traffic Service together with the VHF channel 16 using VHF DSC in Turkish Straits.

13 SAR boats (10 of them are high speed), 5 (RHIB) rigged hull inflatable boats and 15 vehicles to be able to transport of the main equipment Whip and Breeches Buoy of shore based rescue stations are deployed in 15 rescue stations in both Black Sea approaches of Turkish Straits and in Turkish Straits.

Rescue services are performed in two different types as shore based and at sea by boat.

Shore based rescue services are performed for the vessels grounded as drifting to shore with mentioned vehicles by sending line with rockets for whip and breeches buoy equipments when the causality occurs.

Life saving operation in vicinity of offshore is performed by 10 high speed rescue boats (30 knots) having the capability of self-righting and self-floating, and by 3 SAR boats (12 konts) and 5 RHIBs (35-40 knots).

Salvage Department of DGCS has fulfilled the services of tugs, underwater works, salvage&towage with 2 conventional salvage vessels, 4 Fi-Fi class-1 tugs, 11 Firefighting tugs and various type service boats which make up to 25 vessels. Additionally, our project is to include 2 Fi-Fi Class-2 tugs in our fleet in the near future.

DGCS has the capability of responding marine oilspills during salvage operation or in case of any emergency situation to respond to the marine oilspills.

=== Turkish Straits Vessel Traffic ===
Turkish Straits Vessel Traffic Services (TSVTS) are to be rendered up to now from at the end of 2003 in the interest area –called Turkish Straits- and equipped with 13 observation Towers. Each Observation Towers has X band radar, Monocolor - Color-Infrared Camera and Network Equipment . A few Towers has extra, meteorological Stations and communications equipments.

Republic of Turkish Government has invested 45 million USD since 1999 and spent 7 million USD as a running cost for the TSVTS.

With all of those above mentioned investment, The services to be realized within the baseline of Vessel’s Master Responsibility are as follows:

Monitoring electronic display chart all of vessels movement on area of interest.

Navigational Assistance to Captains to routing the vessels.

Information Services to give the knowledge regarding meteorological and hydrographical situations etc. of Turkish Straits.

Promulgation of navigational information and general warnings

Last but not least, Traffic Organization Service is aimed to effective vessels passing planning within the certain criteria without wasting time vessels on the entrance of Turkish Straits.

=== Navigational ===
Aids to Navigational Services organized along the Turkish coast are to be rendered with 417 lighthouses, 34 light-buoys, 19 marking buoys, 15 fog whistles, 2 fog bell and 3 beacon 9 racon equipments.

=== Coastal radio station ===
It obviates the need of Marine Communication of Turkish and foreign flagged vessel in all over the world seas by using different frequency bands as telephone, telex and telegraph. It has short/middle/long frequency, DSC and Navtex stations. Conducting Distress, Search and Rescue, Navtex and Routine Radio Telephone and Radi Telex communications by; Remote controlled VHF/MF/HF/ Navtex coastal stations.

Turk Radio is Navtex Coordinator and Accounting Authority in Turkey. There are 26 VHF stations unmanned and controlled rometly by 3 control centers in all Turkish coasts.

== Fleet ==
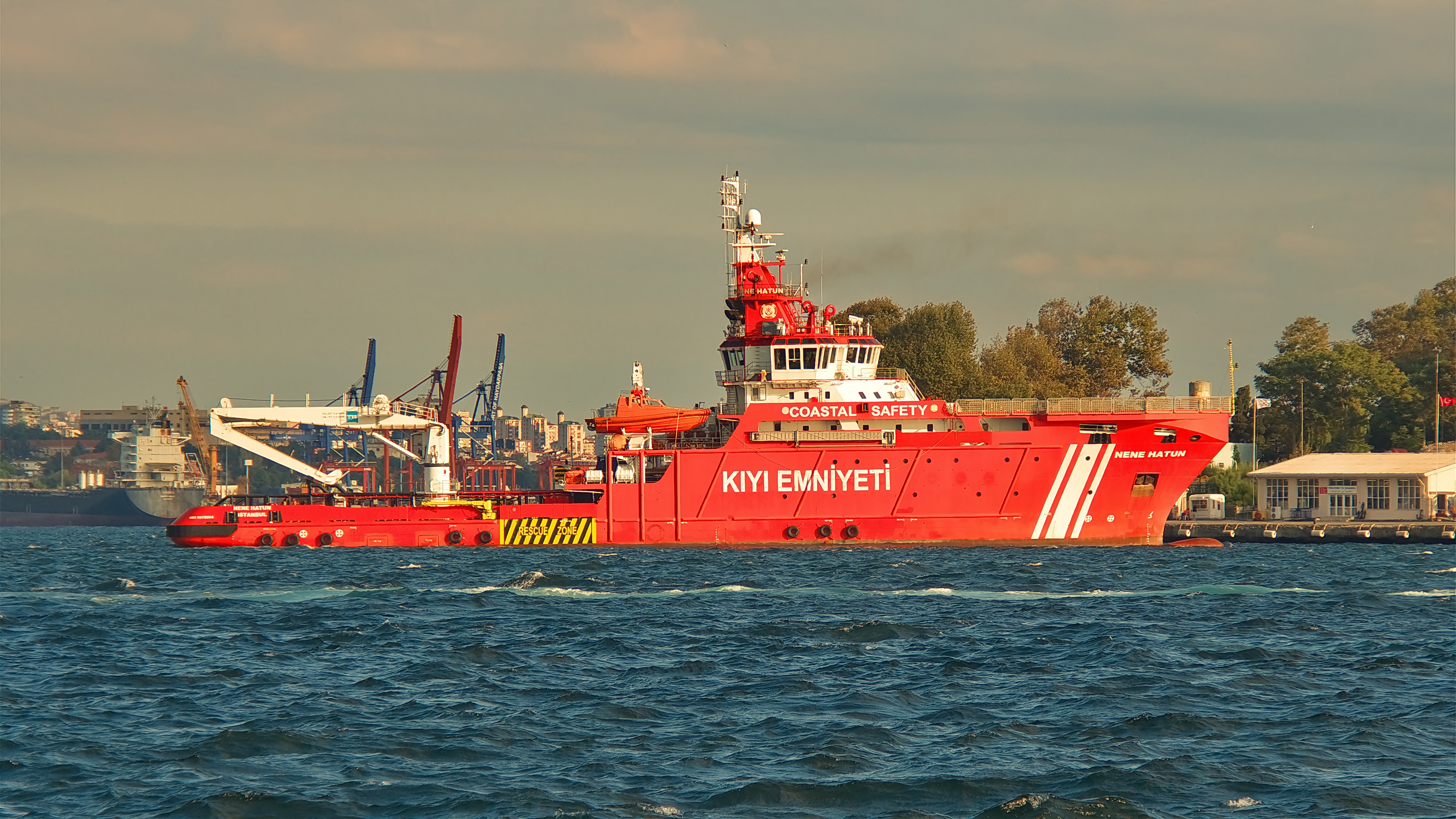
ERV Nene Hatun

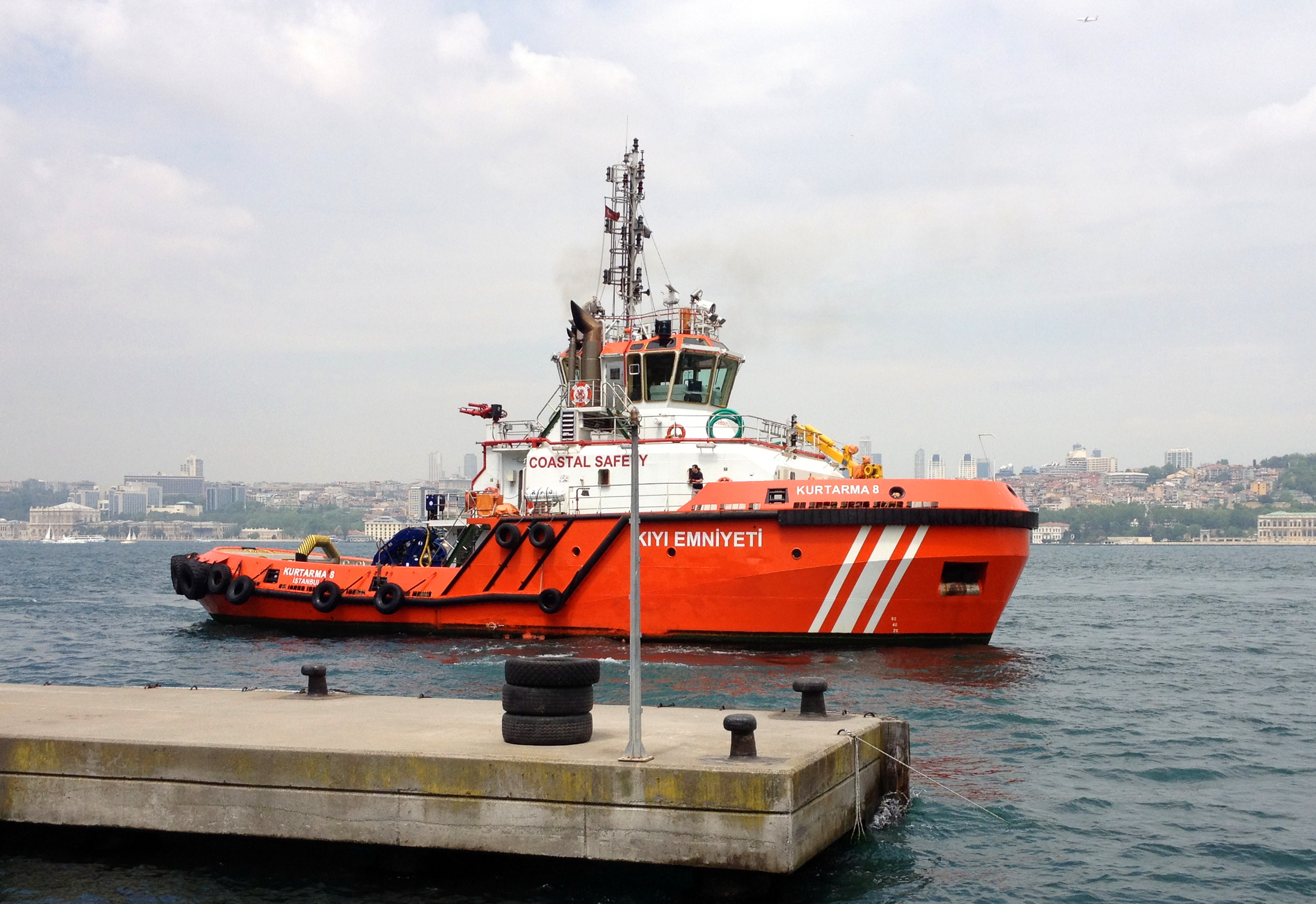
Kurtarma 8

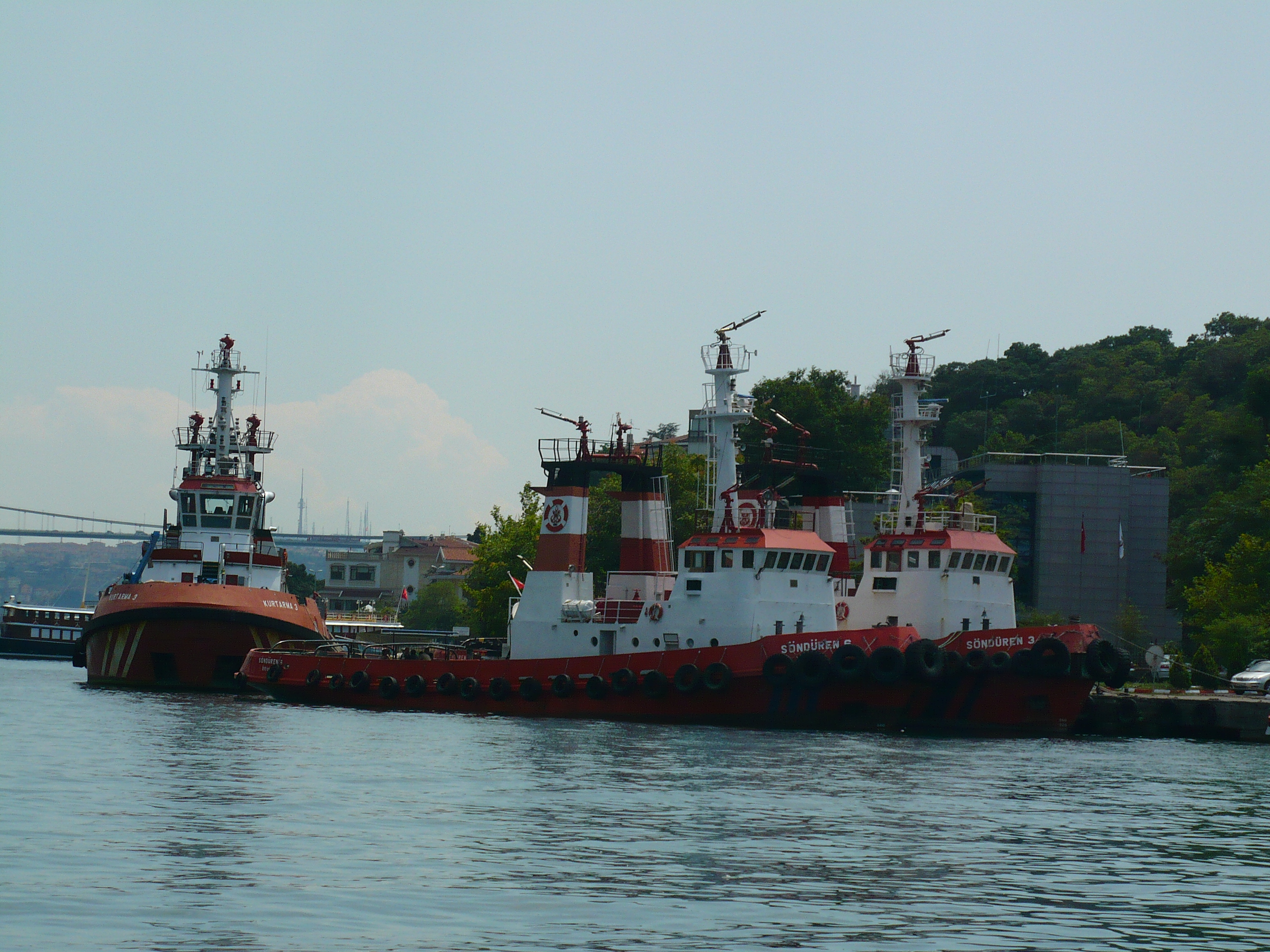
Kurtarma 3 (left), Söndüren 6 (right)

The DGCS operates following fleet of ships and boats:

- ERV Nene Hatun, emergency response vessel
- ORV Seyit Onbaşı, oil recovery vessel
- A9, A10, salvage and fire fighting
- M/TUG Gemi Kurtaran, ship salvage
- A5, Tug supply vessel
- Kurtarma 1-2-3-4-5-6-7-8, salvage and fire fighting boat
- M/TUG Nazım Tur
- M/TUG Poyraz
- M/TUG Zübeyde Ana
- M/TUG Kız Kulesi
- M/TUG Söndüren 2-3-4-5-6-7,9-10-12, fire fighting boat
- KIYEM 1-2-3-4
- FRC Kıyı Emniyeti 1-2-3-4-5-6-7-8-9-00, fast response cutter
- Kılavuz1-2-3, pilot boat
- Tahlisiye I, search and rescue
- Tahlisiye II-III, boom deploy boat
- KEM 1-2
- Liman Kontrol 1-2-3-4-5-6-7-8-9-11, supply boat
- Ata 1-2-3-4, pilot boat
- Pilot 61-62-63-64-65-67-68-70-71-73-74-76, pilot boat
- Palamar 19-24-25, mooring boat
- Fener 1, lighthouse supply boat
- Kıyı 1-2-3-4-5, rigid inflatable boat
- Çwvre 1-2-3, ecosystem barge
