= Village Institutes =

Former educational institutes for teachers in Turkey

Hasanoğlan Village Institute students from Tekmen

Village Institutes (Turkish: Köy Enstitüleri) were a group of rural schools in Turkey founded in accordance with a project led by Hasan Âli Yücel, who was the Minister of Education at the time. The project started on April 17, 1940 in order to train teachers. They were the cornerstones of the rural development projects in the post-war Turkish state. At the time there weren't many educational institutions in most villages, the institutes helped educate the rural populace. Village Institutes were established to meet the needs of the teachers of each village. Despite their short lifespan, they increased the number of primary schools in the country. They had the support of president İsmet İnönü and the director general of primary education İsmail Hakkı Tonguç.

== Foundation and general information ==
Students were selected among the most successful students in the villages and after taking education they went back to these villages to work as teachers because for the other people educated at the other teacher training schools, going to a village and being teachers those places are seen as obligatory works. However, the rate of literacy was as low as 5% in the early times of the Turkish Republic and the 80% of the total population were living in the villages. A pedagogist named Halil Fikret Kanad had been working on this project for a long time and he supported the idea of training ambitious teachers being volunteers at these villages.

Village Institutes had its roots in 1936 when the first Teacher Course (Eğitmen Kursu) was started in Çifteler, Eskişehir, Upon the success of this first course, 3 other village teacher schools were opened in İzmir, Kırklareli, Kastamonu. Officially established in 1940, the village institutes started to be founded in the areas which have cultivable lands and easier access through railway. The law numbered 3803 envisaged the conversion of existing trial schools into institutes and the opening of seventeen new Village Institutes. In these schools founded at 21 different regions of Turkey, the teachers would teach villagers both how to read and write and modern agriculture methods. Instead of education based on just books, they taught people by practicing things in the right place. With this purpose, all the schools had their own fields, farms, workshops and animals. Until its closure, a lot of fields became useful for agriculture and the production in these fields increased. A great number of warehouses, new roads and buildings were built by the people educating at these schools. Until 1954 when they were closed, 1,308 women and 15,943 men, namely totally 17,251 people were educated as teachers.

== Courses ==
The schools were built near the cultivable fields because one of the aims of these institutes is to teach people the new methods for agriculture. The education in village institutes included both practical (agriculture, construction, arts and crafts etc.) and classical (mathematics, science, literature, history etc.) courses. A teacher graduated from these institutes is not only a primary school teacher but also has some practical knowledge about many areas such as apiculture, fisheries, carpentry...etc. Even the buildings for these schools were built by the teachers sent there with the help of the villagers. Their daily routine included morning gymnastics, reading hours and farming. Each student has to read 25 books for each year and learn how to play a musical instrument. They also had weekly meetings in which students can freely criticize teachers and school administration. These institutes became good and rare examples of learning by doing and from this aspect they became the subjects for many studies.

== Closure ==
In the final years of their service, there were a total of twenty Village Institutes and one Superior Village Institute that trains teachers for the others. They gave about 25000 graduates.

Despite their great benefits, many parts of the society were against these schools. Conservatives opposed the co-ed education in a boarding school. It was very hard to persuade parents at villages to let their daughters to study there. Anti-communist and anti-socialist movements, strong at the time, attacked the schools and lower their reputation in the society. School libraries contained leftist books as well and students were expected to read different political thoughts. Also many landlords that control villages were disturbed by the highly educated teachers coming back. They not only formed primary schools but also educated the villagers both intellectually and about agriculture.

In 1945 the Village Institutes began to be subjected to violent attacks by the conservative wing of the CHP and the newly founded DP. The Village Institutes were accused of fostering a subversive, unruly, anti-traditional generation and being the hotbeds of Marxist indoctrination. These attacks were waged mainly by the great landowners in and outside of the Parliament and their mouthpieces in the press.

The Government was forced to close them due to strong pressure from the society, opposition party and upcoming elections. Although the government eventually lost the elections anyway. The Village Institutes were transformed into regular teacher-training schools by the DP government (elected in 1950) as a concession to the anti-secularist groups, however these were eventually shut down in 1954.

== See also ==
- Halkevleri
