= Banu Avar =

Turkish political commentator (born 1955)

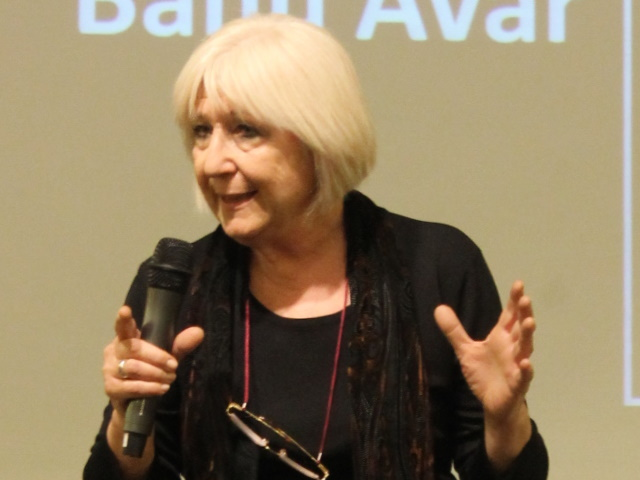
- Born: July 18, 1955 (age 71); Turkey
- Education: City University, London
- Occupations: Author, journalist, news anchor, and political commentator
- Writing career
- Years active: 1980-present
- Notable awards: Turkish Writers Union, Television Programmer of the Year Award (2005) TÜRKSAV Service Award (2005) Istanbul Kültür University Faculty of Art and Design "Courageous Woman Award" (2006) Yeditepe University honorary doctorate (20 April 2007)

Banu Avar (born 18 July 1955, Eskişehir) is a Turkish author, journalist, news anchor, and political commentator. She started her career at the Turkish magazine Süreç in 1980, and has worked in newspapers such as Günaydın, Dünya, and Vatan.

After getting her master's degree at City University, London, she worked at the BBC as a radio reporter for the Turkish news department and trained with the BBC documentary department. She was hired by Turkish Radio and Television Corporation (TRT) in London. A short time later, she became a reporter for the popular TV programme 32. Since 1985 she has worked as a producer. In 1999, she created two programmes for TRT. She has also made documentaries for the Discovery Channel and the BBC.

In 1999, she started documentaries with TV8 and worked there as a director until 2004. After leaving that job, she transferred to TRT 1 and started producing documentaries for them, beginning with Sınırlar Arasında. So far, more than 20 such documentaries have appeared on TV. She has also presented an anti-capitalist programme for TRT 1.

Countries which have shown her work include France, the Netherlands, Israel, Palestine, Uzbekistan, Iran, Algeria, Denmark, and the UK. She has become more critical of Turkey and other European countries.

== Awards ==
- Turkish Writers Union, Television Programmer of the Year Award (2005)
- TÜRKSAV Service Award (2005)
- Contemporary Journalists Association 2006 Award for Television News
- Akdeniz University, Atatürk's Principles and Revolution History Research and Application Center "Award for contributions to Kemalist thought" (2006–2007)
- Istanbul Kültür University Faculty of Art and Design "Courageous Woman Award" (2006)
- Yeditepe University honorary doctorate (20 April 2007)

== Filmography ==
- Deniz (1999)
- Hayatım Müzik (May 1999–January 2000)
- Önemli müzik adamlarının yaşam öyküleri (15 episodes)
- Depremle Yaşamak (2000) (10 episodes)
- Unutulan Yıllar (2000)
- Denizciler Belgeseli (2000–2001)
- Deniz Kuvvetleri Komutanlığı desteğiyle Türkiye’nin Denizcilik Tarihi
- Deniz Kuvvetleri, Deniz Ticareti ve Deniz Sporunun Tarihi ve Bugünü (9 episodes)
- Türkiye Sevdalıları (2000–2001)
- Afghanistan: Devlerin Savaş Alanı (2002)
- Ohri Ohri Güzel Ohri (2002)
- Artık Biz De Varız (2002)
- Atletin Adı: Süreyya (2002)
- Bir Zamanlar Kıbrıs'ta (2003)
- Unutulan Yıllar (2003)
- Kafkaslarda Politik Bir Satranç Ustası: Rıza Oğlu Haydar Aliyev (2004)
- Sınırlar Arasında (2004–2008)

== Books ==
- Sınırlar Arasında – Hüznün Toprağı Balkanlar'dan Geleceğin Gücü Avrasya'ya (ISBN 975-293-458-7)
- Avrasyalı Olmak (ISBN 9944975613)
- Hangi Avrupa? (ISBN 9789944212250)
- Böl ve Yut (ISBN 9789751413147)
- Hangi Dünya Düzeni (ISBN 978-975-14-1365-9)
