= İsmail Hakkı Tonguç =

Turkish educator (1893–1960)

İsmail Hakkı Tonguç (1893–1960) was a teacher and director for primary education in the Ministry of National Education of Turkey. He is considered to have deeply influenced the education program during the single party era and the Village Institutes, which trained teachers.

== Early life and education ==
Tonguç was born on the 1893 in the village Atmaca in the Ottoman Empire (present-day Sokol in Bulgaria) as the oldest of eight siblings. He attended primary school in his village and high school in Silistre at the Danube river from where he graduated in 1907. After graduating he returned to his family and worked in the fields. In 1914 he was in Istanbul and after several attempts he was able to enter the teachers training school, a boarding school in Kastamonu. After one and a half years in Kastamonu, he demanded his transfer to Istanbul. Arriving in Istanbul in 1916, he learned that the name Hakki was added to his identity card which was a common practice to differentiate the students. After graduation he was spared from military service as a teacher and sent to Germany for further education. He was sent to the teachers train school in Ettlingen near Karlsruhe. After the Occupation of Istanbul at the end of World War I, he was called back and assigned as a teacher in the teachers training school in Eskisehir in 1919. When the allied powers attempted the conquer Eskisehir, Tonguç moved to Ankara. In 1921, he returned to Ettlingen in Germany to complete his studies and returned in 1922. Following he was appointed as a teacher in the teacher training schools in Konya in 1922 and Ankara in 1924.

== Professional career ==
In 1926 he was assigned as an instructor for teachers in the Ministry of National Education, his first official assignment in the Ministry. He brought in instructors from Germany and focused on learning on the job training. In late 1929 he toured Europe and brought educational materials with him. By 1931 he became ill and underwent surgery. In the early 1930s, he developed new approaches to the educational system of Turkey and in 1934 he was shortly appointed as the director of the Gazi Education Institute.

He was appointed as the General Director of elementary education in 1935. In the early years of his tenure existed thirteen village schools in which over about 2800 teachers were taught. He had a strong impact on the establishment of Village Institutes in the rural areas aiming for those institutes to educate leaders for the villages. He wanted the graduates of the institutes to live in the villages and that through them the village would be transformed into a developed village. All the peasants where Village Institutes were located, had to devote twenty days a year to the service of the Village Institute. This by some Turkish intellectuals called "coerced" labor was influenced by the practices in Bulgaria and Nazi Germany where the population had to work between four and eight months for the national Government. By the 1940s, the learning by doing practice became an integral part of the Village Institutes. He stayed in his office until 1946.

In September 1946, he appointed to the Board of Education following which he wrote two books on education and revised one he had written before. In 1950 he was called to the Ministry of Education following which he demanded his retirement which was granted in 1954.

== Later life ==
After his retirement he travelled through Europe for a family visit to his son in Germany and to study the pedagogic ideas from Johann Heinrich Pestalozzi. In 1960 he published a book on the Pestalozzi Children's Village. He died on 24 June 1960.

== Personal life ==
He was married to Nafia Kemal, a student of his. They married in 1927 and had a son in 1928. A second son of his died shortly after birth in 1937. His family moved from Bulgaria to Turkey in 1927. He was named İsmail by his parents and was added the name Hakki by his teacher in 1916. In 1934, as a result of the surname law, he was given his surname Tonguç.
