= Battle of Erzurum (1877) =

1877 battle of the Russo-Turkish War (1877–1878)

- Part of the Russo-Turkish War (1877–1878)
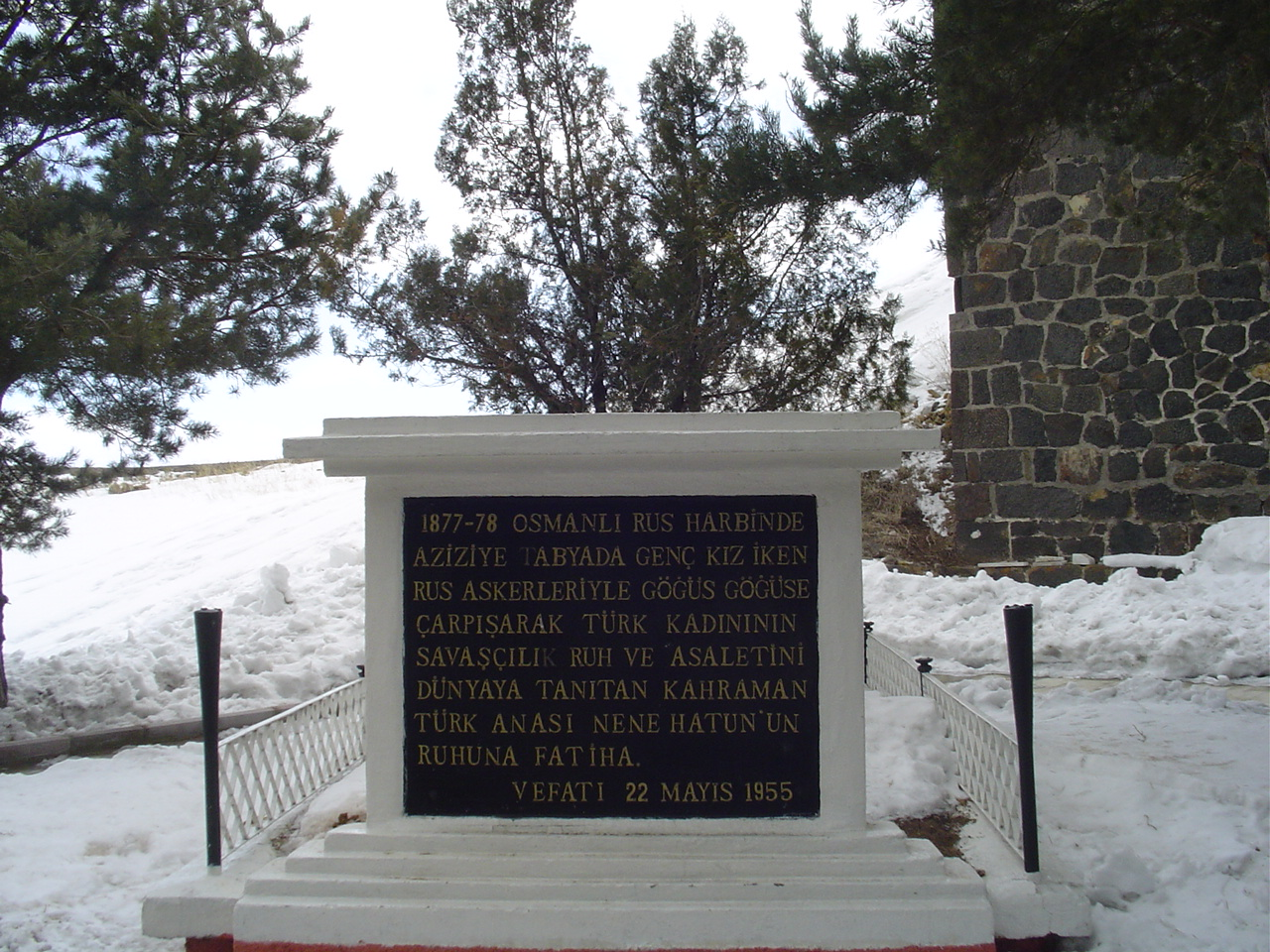
- Monument of Russo-Ottoman war
Date	8–9 November 1877
Location	Erzurum, Ottoman Empire
Result	Ottoman victory

Belligerents
Russian Empire	Ottoman Empire

Commanders and leaders
Vasily Geyman	Ahmed Muhtar Pasha

Strength
25,000, only a part engaged	Up to 12,000 (Mostly civilians and militias), 15-20 guns

Casualties and losses
400–600	1,600 killed/routed

The Battle of Erzurum was a military engagement fought between the Ottoman Empire and the Russian Empire, during the Russo-Turkish War of 1877–1878. The battle was fought on 8-9 November 1877 on the Ottoman territory and ended with the Russians withdrawing to instead besiege Kars, which fell afterwards.

On 4 November 1877 the Russian army achieved a victory at Uzunahmet, having inflicted heavy casualties on the Turks, which included 3,000 killed and wounded, 1,000 prisoners and 42 artillery pieces left by the panicked gunners, with a loss of only 1,200 men. Although the Turkish troops ceased resistance and were fleeing in disarray, with 4,000 of them deserting the army, a part of their infantry maintained order and retreated to the well-fortified position in Erzurum with 14 guns. The Russians, being miles away and exhausted by the battle, did not chase them and therefore missed a chance to capture Erzurum on the heels of the fleeing enemy. Having developed a plan of assault on the stronghold, the Russian army advanced under the cover of night, but had difficulties of movement control in the dark. A part of their troops from the 153rd Infantry Regiment mistook their direction and captured one of the redoubts, Aziziye, all by themselves, without help from the rest of the army, but had to leave it due to the lack of support. All the three Turkish battalions stationed in the Aziziye redoubt were routed, numbering 1,600, whereas the Russians lost 400 or 600 men in this battle. After the Russians left Aziziye, the Turks made an attempt to counterattack them, but were successfully driven back. As the works of Erzurum were too strong to be taken by assault, the siege park was needed at Kars and in the following days the weather set in with a snowstorm, the Russians decided to withdraw their army and instead attack Kars, which they succeeded in capturing. Ahmed Muhtar Pasha, the Ottoman commander during the siege, requested reinforcements from Istanbul and was receiving them all through November. After epidemics broke out, he withdrew his forces to Bayburt for the remainder of the war. Muhtar Pasha was awarded the title Ghazi for his role in the defence of Erzurum, Gedikler and Yahniler. Despite the lack of defences, there would be no Russian assaults into the city. A low-scale siege would be conducted by the Russian Army until the truce on 31st of January 1878.

Third-party reports on the battle for Fort Aziziye speak of mutilations being inflicted on the Russian soldiers. C. B. Norman recorded that

And now I have to place on record one of those acts of cold-blooded atrocity which, alas, have been furnished in such ghastly quantities by the present war. Directly it became known in the city of Erzeroum that the fortunes of the day rested with the Osmanli, bands of women trooped up to the field armed with knives, hatchets, choppers, whatever household weapons came first to their hands, and then commenced a system of mutilations which it does not do to dwell on. Suffice to say that from Englishmen, who visited the battlefield on the following day, I learn that nearly every Russian found lying on the ground was decapitated and subjected to nameless outrage, and that the appearance of the wounds proved that many of them were inflicted on still living men.
