= 10th Parliament of Turkey =

The 10th Grand National Assembly of Turkey existed from 2 May 1954 to 1 November 1957. There were 541 MPs in the parliament. While the Democrat Party (DP) won a vast majority. The opposition was represented by the Republican People's Party (CHP) with 30 seats, the Republican Nation Party with 5 seats and 7 Independents. In 1955 a new party (Liberty Party) was also founded.

== Main parliamentary milestones ==
Some of the important events in the history of the parliament are the following:

- 14 May 1954 – Celal Bayar was elected as the President of Turkey for the second time
- 17 May 1954 – Adnan Menderes formed the 21st government of Turkey
- 30 May 1954 – Law 6429 Kırşehir Province was abolished (In the 1954 elections Kırşehir citizens had voted for CMP)
- 22 May 1955 – Polemics in the parliament between DP and CHP
- 12 September 1955 – Martial law as a result of 6-7 September demonstrations
- 15 October 1955 – A group of MPs were expelled from DP because of their support to "right to prove" in media.
- 8 December – Adnan Menderes formed 22nd government of Turkey
- 29 December 1955 – Liberty Party was founded by ex DP MPs.
- 1 July 1957 – Law 7001: Kırşehir Province was reestablished
- 27 October 1957 – General Elections

Preceded by 9th Parliament of Turkey	10th Parliament of Turkey; Refik Koraltan; 2 May 1954-1 November 1957	Succeeded by 11th Parliament of Turkey
