= 11th Parliament of Turkey =

1957 general election result(1957-1960)

The 11th Grand National Assembly of Turkey existed from 27 October 1957 to 27 May 1960. There were 610 MPs in the parliament. While The Democrat Party (DP) won a vast majority, the opposition was represented by the Republican People's Party (CHP) with 173 seats, the Republican Nation Party (CMP) and Liberty Party (HP) each with 4 seats and 2 Independents.

== Main parliamentary milestones ==
Some of the important events in the history of the parliament are the following:

- 1 November 1957– Celal Bayar was elected as the President of Turkey for the third time
- 25 November 1957 - Adnan Menderes of DP formed the 23rd government of Turkey
- 17 October 1958 - CMP merged with another party to form Republican Villagers Nation Party
- 24 November 1958 – HP dissolved itself (Partially merged to CHP)
- 17 February 1959 –Adnan Menderes survived 1959 Turkish Airlines Gatwick crash. This event briefly introduced détente in domestic policy
- 4 March 1959 – Parliament majority ratified London and Zurich Agreements. But CHP opposed it
- 7 November 1959 – Osman Bölükbaşı the leader of CMP was jailed
- 15 April 1960 - Committee of Inquest a superpower committee composed of DP MPs was formed
- 27 May 1960 - 1960 Turkish coup d'état

Preceded by 10th Parliament of Turkey	11th Parliament of Turkey; Refik Koraltan; 1 November 1957-27 May 1960	Succeeded by Constituent Assembly of Turkey (Note: Including MBK period)
