= 1952 in Turkey =

- Centuries: 20th; 21st
- Decades: 1930s; 1940s; 1950s; 1960s; 1970s
- See also: List of years in Turkey

Events in the year 1952 in Turkey.

== Parliament ==
- 9th Parliament of Turkey

== Incumbents ==
- President – Celal Bayar
- Prime Minister – Adnan Menderes
- Leader of the opposition – İsmet İnönü

== Ruling party and the main opposition ==
- Ruling party – Democrat Party (DP)
- Main opposition – Republican People's Party (CHP)

== Cabinet ==
- 20th government of Turkey

== Events ==
- 3 January – 1952 Hasankale earthquake
- 18 February – Turkey became a member of NATO
- 16 June – The ban on the female Ottoman dynasty members to enter Turkey was lifted
- 20 August – Günseli Başar won the European Beauty pageant
- 22 November – Attempted assassination of journalist Ahmet Emin Yalman.
- 24 December – Upon Fuat Köprülü's proposal, the Turkish wording of the constitıion was partially changed to Ottoman Turkish

== Births ==
- 8 April – Ahmet Piriştina, politician
- 20 April – Erol Küçükbakırcı, cyclist
- 11 May – Nur Batur, journalist
- 23 May – Hayati Yazıcı, politician
- 1 June – Şenol Güneş, football coach
- 1 June – Ali Müfit Gürtuna, politician
- 9 June – Bülent Ersoy, singer
- 2 September – Salih Memecan, caricaturist
- 28 June – Enis Batur, writer and publisher

== Deaths ==
- 5 February – Ömer Fevzi Eyüboğlu (born in 1884), journalist
- 13 March – Ömer Rıza Doğrul (born 1893), publisher and politician
- 16 May – Memduh Şevket Esendal (born in 1884), writer
- 28 December – Kerim Erim (born 1894), mathematician and physicist.

== Gallery ==
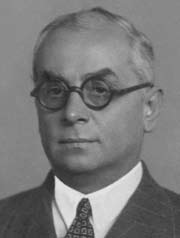
Celal Bayar

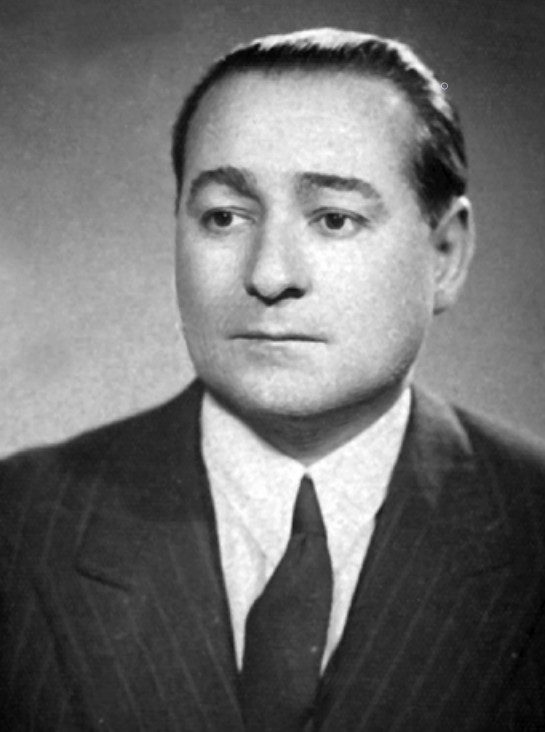
Adnan Menderes

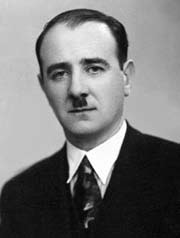
Fuat Köprülü

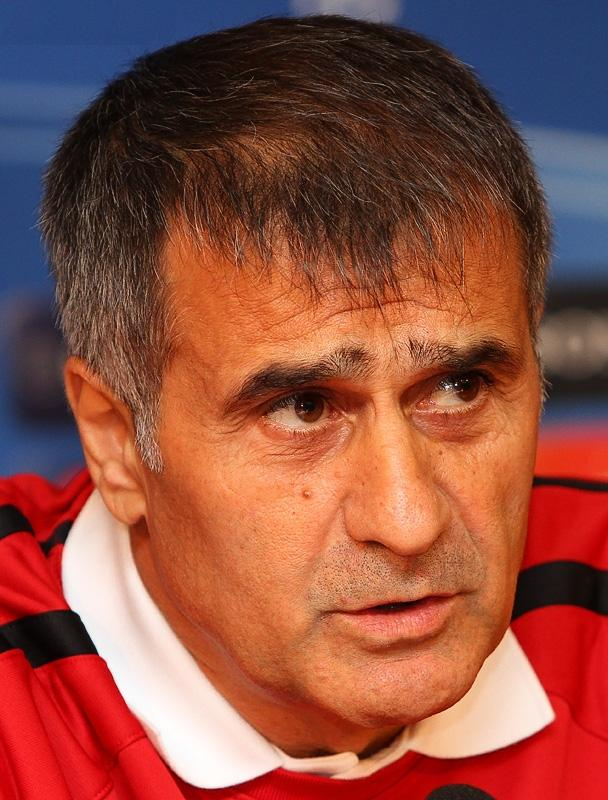
Şenol Güneş

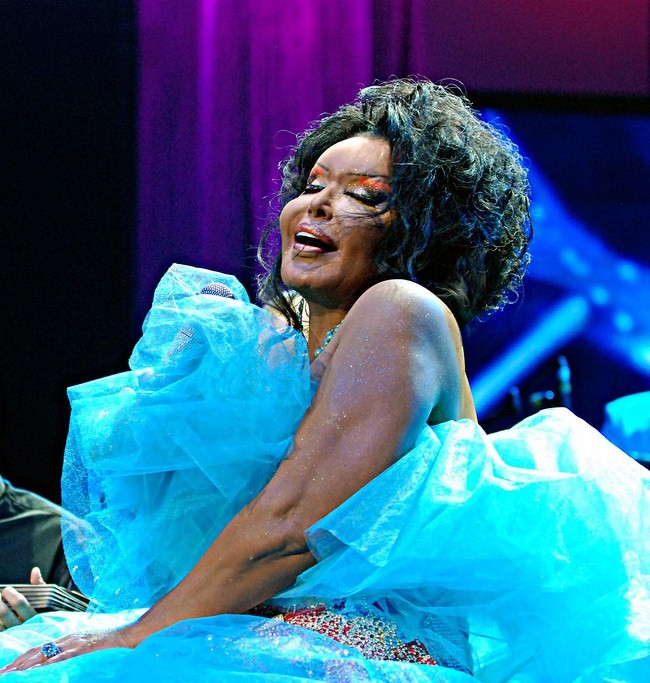
Bülent Ersoy

== See also ==
- Turkey at the 1952 Summer Olympics
