= 1950 in Turkey =

- Centuries: 20th; 21st
- Decades: 1930s; 1940s; 1950s; 1960s; 1970s
- See also: List of years in Turkey

Events in the year 1950 in Turkey.

== Parliament ==
- 8th Parliament of Turkey (up to 2 May)
- 9th Parliament of Turkey

== Incumbents ==
- President

İsmet İnönü (up to 20 May June)
Celal Bayar (from 20 May June)

- Prime Minister

Şemsettin Günaltay (up to 2 June)
Adnan Menderes (from 2 June)

- Leader of the opposition

Celal Bayar (up to 20 May)
İsmet İnönü (from 2 June)

== Ruling party and the main opposition ==
- Ruling party

Republican People's Party (CHP) (up to 2 June)
Democrat Party (DP) (from 2 June)

- Main opposition

Democrat Party (DP) (up to 2 June)
Republican People's Party (CHP) (from 2 June)

== Cabinet ==
- 18th government of Turkey (up to 2 June)
- 19th government of Turkey (from 2 June)

== Events ==
- 11 April – Demonstrations in the funeral ceremony of Fevzi Çakmak
- 14 May – General elections, winner takes all system ( DP 396 seats, CHP 68 seats, MP 1 seat, Indep.7 seats)
- 16 July – Ezan (call for prayer) which had been translated into Turkish during the CHP governments was restored to traditional Arabic.
- 3 September – Local elections
- 21 September – Turkish Brigade to Korean War was sent off to Korea.
- 22 October – Census (population 20,947,188)
- 27 November – Beginning of the Battle of Wawon (Kunuri) in Korea in which Turkish brigade distinguished itself.(237 deaths and 825 total casualties)

== Births ==
- 1 January – Şükrü Sina Gürel, former government minister
- 22 February – Seyit Kırmızı, cyclist
- 1 March – Bülent Ortaçgil, singer
- 17 March – Mehmet Ali İrtemçelik, former government minister
- 20 October – Abdullah Gül, former president

== Deaths ==
- 2 April – Recep Peker (born in 1889), former prime minister (15th government of Turkey)
- 10 April – Fevzi Çakmak (born in 1876), former chief of staff and the only marshal of the Turkish army (after the death of Kemal Atatürk)
- 1 October – Faik Ali Ozansoy (born in 1876), politician and poet
- 2 November - Huriye Öniz (born in 1887) - one of the first female MPs.
- 15 November – Orhan Veli Kanık (born in 1914), poet

== Gallery ==
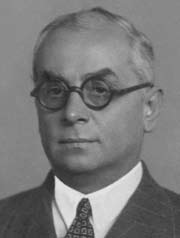
Celal Bayar

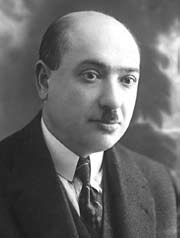
Şemsettin Günaltay

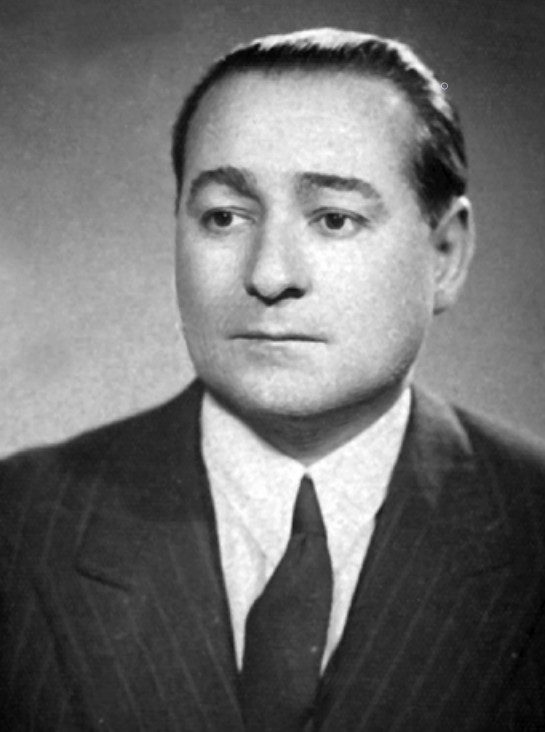
Adnan Menderes

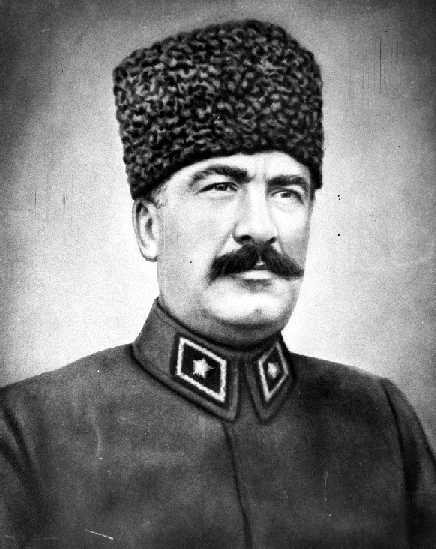
Fevzi Çakmak

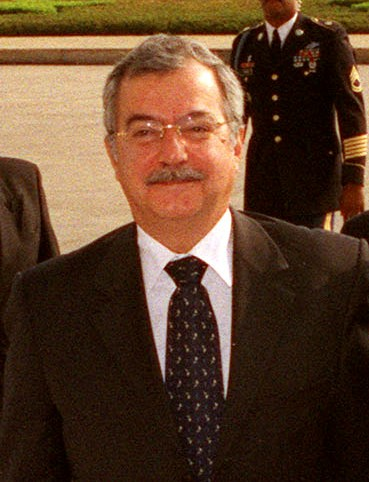
Şükrü Sina Gürel

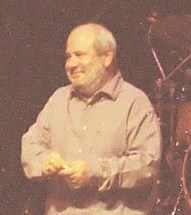
Bülent Ortaçgil

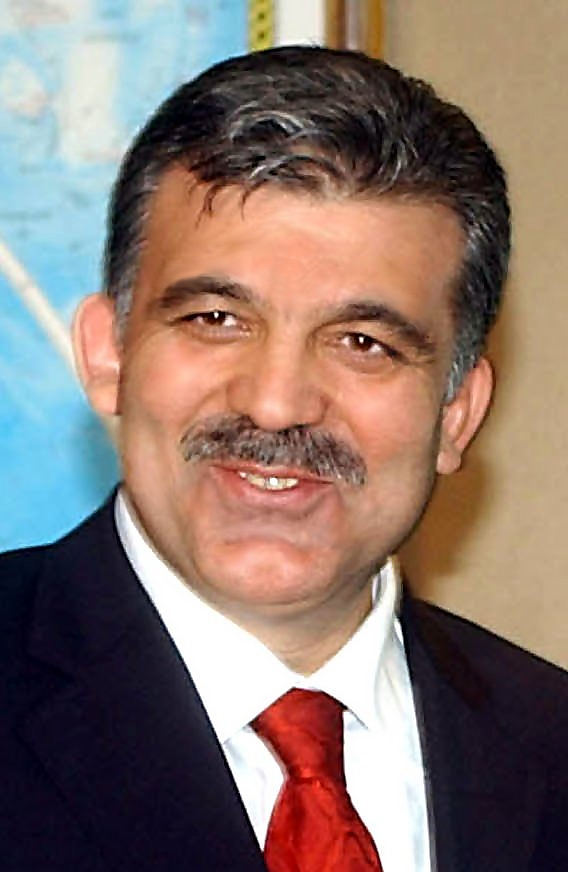
Abdullah Gül

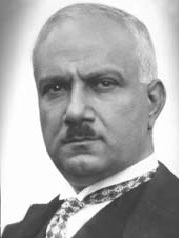
Recep Peker

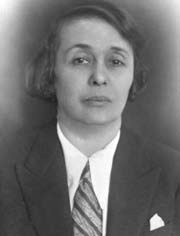
Huriye Öniz
