= 1951 in Turkey =

- Centuries: 20th; 21st
- Decades: 1930s; 1940s; 1950s; 1960s; 1970s
- See also: List of years in Turkey

Events in the year 1951 in Turkey.

== Parliament ==
- 9th Parliament of Turkey

== Incumbents ==
- President – Celal Bayar
- Prime Minister – Adnan Menderes
- Leader of the opposition – İsmet İnönü

== Ruling party and the main opposition ==
- Ruling party – Democrat Party (DP)
- Main opposition – Republican People's Party (CHP)

== Cabinet ==
- 19th government of Turkey (up to 9 March)
- 20th government of Turkey (from 9 March)

== Events ==
- 21 January – First convoy of wounded Turkish Brigade soldiers from Korean War arrived in Turkey
- 26 June – The corpse of the reformist grandvizier Mithat Pasha, who was assassinated in Saudi Arabia in 1883, was buried in Istanbul
- 2 July – Presidential yacht MV Savarona was transferred to the Turkish Naval Forces
- 8 August – Halkevleri, a state sponsored enlightenment project, was ended
- 13 August – 1951 Kurşunlu earthquake
- 17 September – Byelections
- 1 October – Turkish Air Force Academy was founded

== Births ==
- 16 February – Ferhan Şensoy theatre actor
- 5 April, Nedim Gürsel, writer
- 23 July, Leman Sam, singer
- 6 September – Melih Kibar, composer
- 14 December – Nükhet Ruacan, jazz singer
- 16 December – Aykut Barka, earth scientist specialized in earthquakes
- Metin Yurdanur, sculptor

== Deaths ==
- 3 January – Ali Münif Yeğenağa (born in 1874), politician (Ottoman Empire and Turkey)
- 26 July – Ali Sami Yen (born in 1886), founder of Galatasaray sports club
- 20 August – İzzettin Çalışlar (born in 1882), retired general, who participated in the Turkish War of Independence
- 31 August – Mazhar Osman Usman (born in 1884), doctor and the founder of Bakırköy Psychiatric Hospital
- 11 December – Mustafa Muğlalı (born in 1882), retired general, who participated in the Turkish War of Independence

== Gallery ==
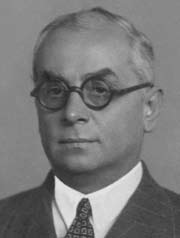
Celal Bayar

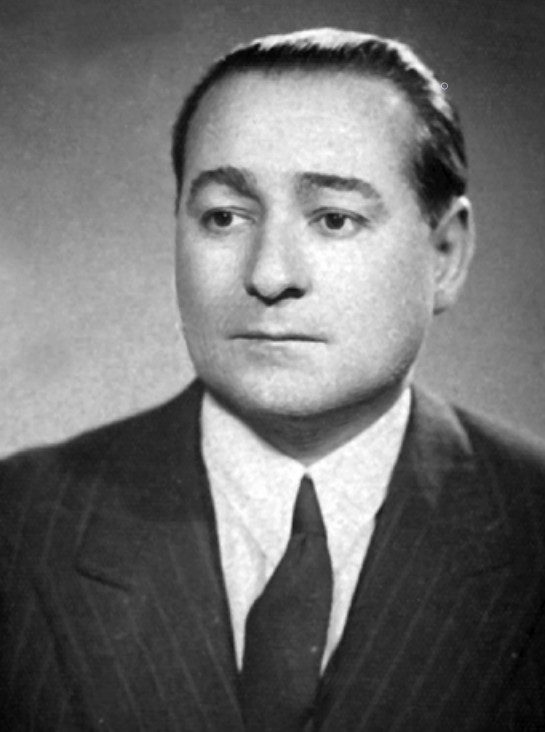
Adnan Menderes

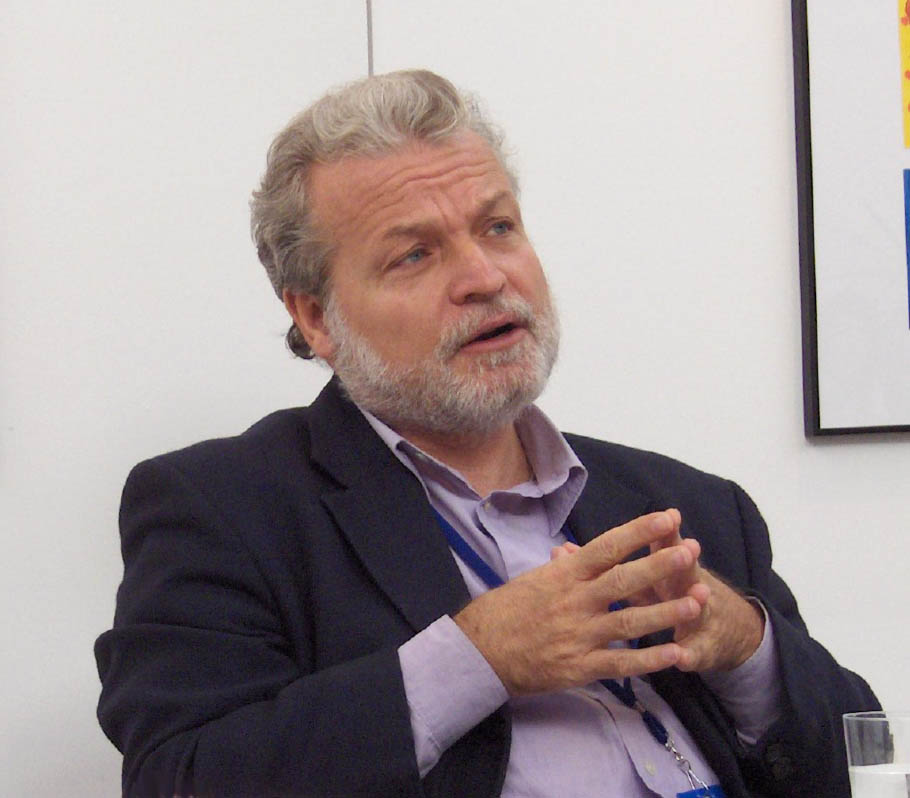
Nedim Gürsel

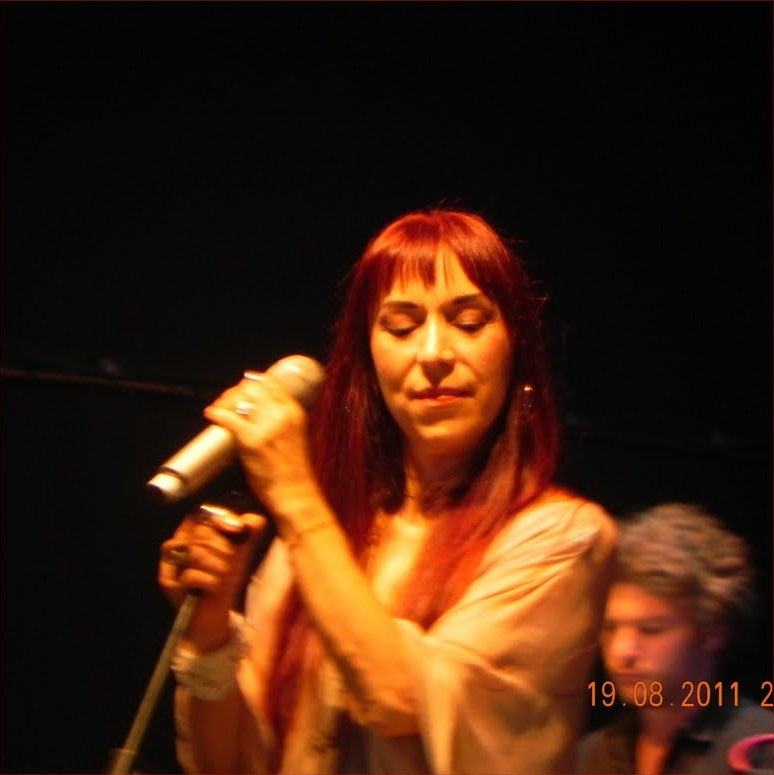
Leman Sam

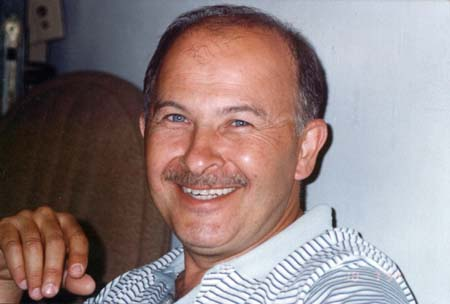
Aykut Barka

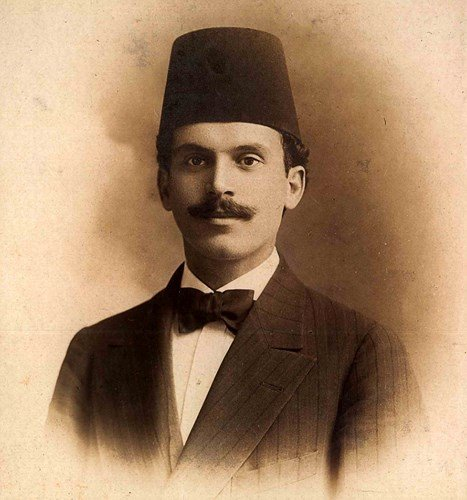
Ali Sami Yen

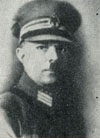
İzzettin Çalışlar

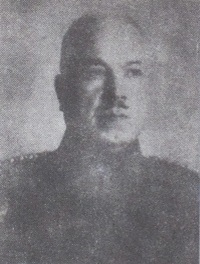
Mustafa Muğlalı
