= 1947 in Turkey =

- Centuries: 20th; 21st
- Decades: 1920s; 1930s; 1940s; 1950s; 1960s
- See also: List of years in Turkey

Events in the year 1947 in Turkey.

== Parliament ==
- 8th Parliament of Turkey

== Incumbents ==
- President – İsmet İnönü
- Prime Minister

Recep Peker (up to 10 September)
Hasan Saka (from 10 September)

- Leader of the opposition

Celal Bayar

== Ruling party and the main opposition ==
- Ruling party – Republican People's Party (CHP)
- Main opposition – Democrat Party (DP)

== Cabinet ==
15th government of Turkey(up to 10 September)
16th government of Turkey (from 10 September)

== Events ==
- 20 February – Trade Union was founded
- 7 April – By elections
- 12 March – US military aid to Turkey
- 12 July – Mutual Declaration of the ruling and the opposition parties about democracy
- 9 September – Recep Peker who was considered as a hard-line politician resigned from his post as prime minister
- 21 September – Mine incident in Kozlu, Zonguldak, 21 deaths
- 25 October – Soviet Union asked to annex Kars and Ardahan in the United Nations assembly
- 27 November – Statues of Halkevleri was changed

== Births ==
- 1 January – Cemil Turan, footballer
- 5 January – Osman Arpacıoğlu, footballer
- 1 April – Beşir Atalay, government minister
- 16 April – Erol Evgin, singer
- 22 December – Tarık Ümit, intelligence official
- 21 May – İlber Ortaylı, academic, historian
- 14 July – Salih Neftçi, economist
- 4 August – Ertuğrul Özkök, journalist
- 5 August – Osman Durmuş, politician, MD
- 15 October – Hümeyra Akbay, singer
- 12 December – Hülya Koçyiğit, actress

== Deaths ==
- 2 February – Mehmet Naki Yücekök (born in 1866), retired military officer
- 6 March – İhsan Eryavuz, former government minister and businessman
- 27 July – Cemal Nadir Güler (born in 1902), caricaturist
- 3 December -Mehmet Atıf Ateşdağlı (born in 1876), retired military officer

== Gallery ==
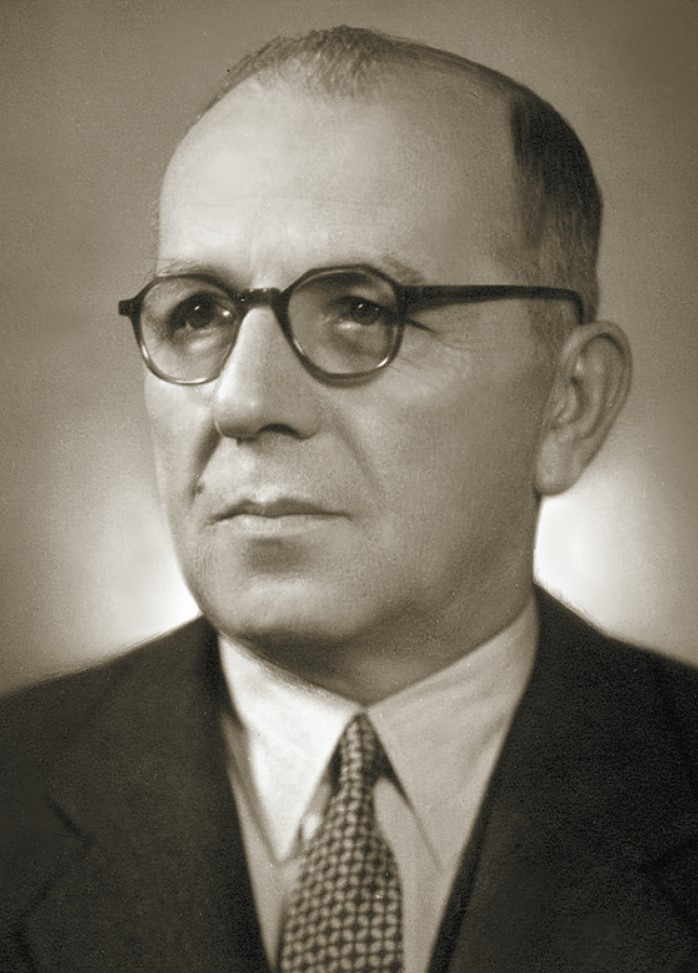
Şükrü Saracoğlu

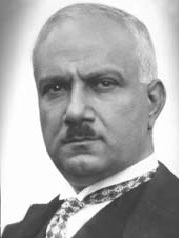
Recep Peker

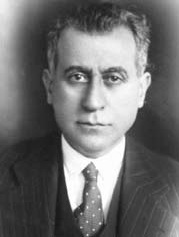
Hasan Saka

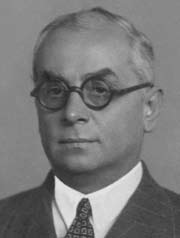
Celal Bayar

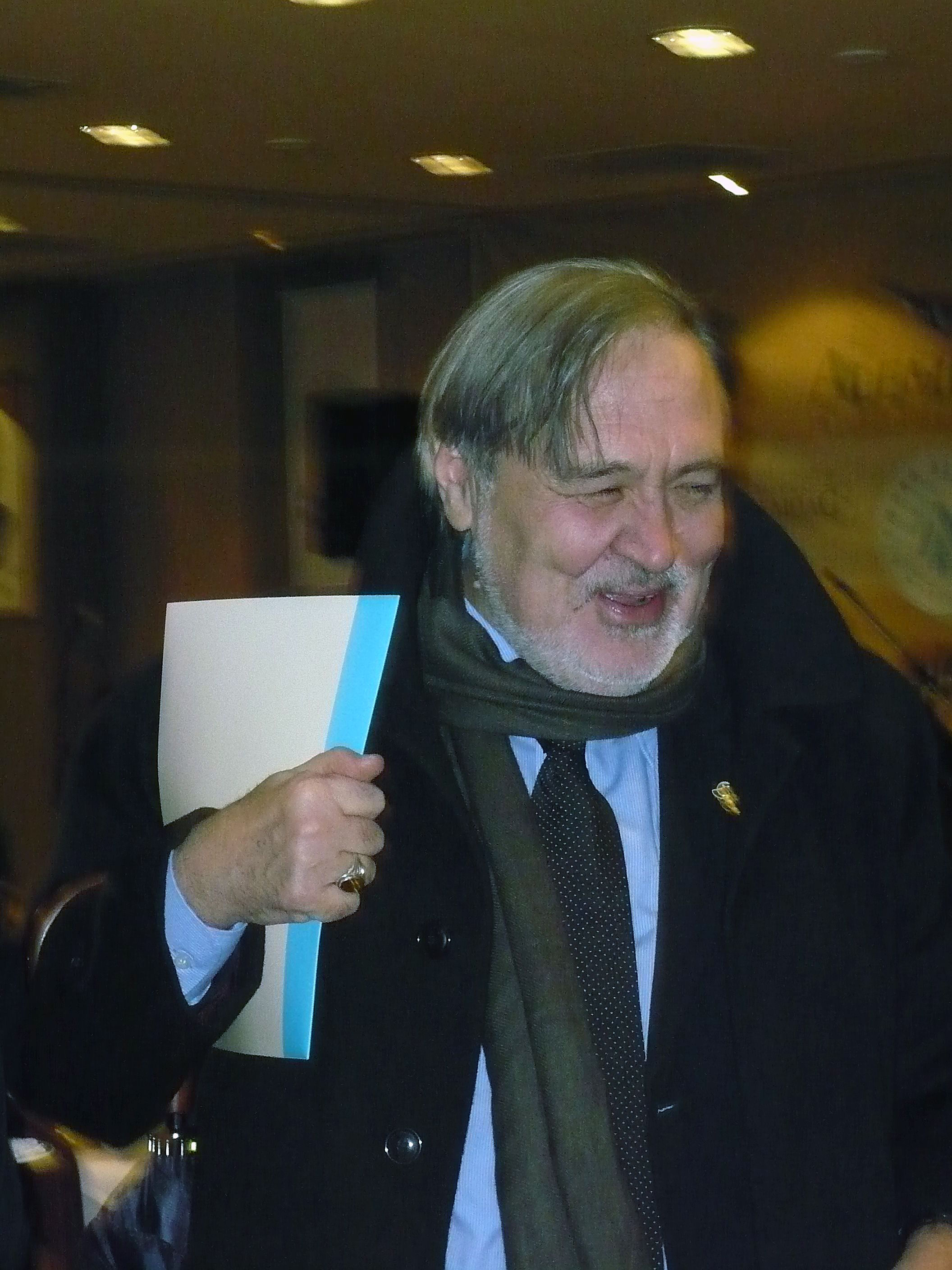
İlber Ortaylı

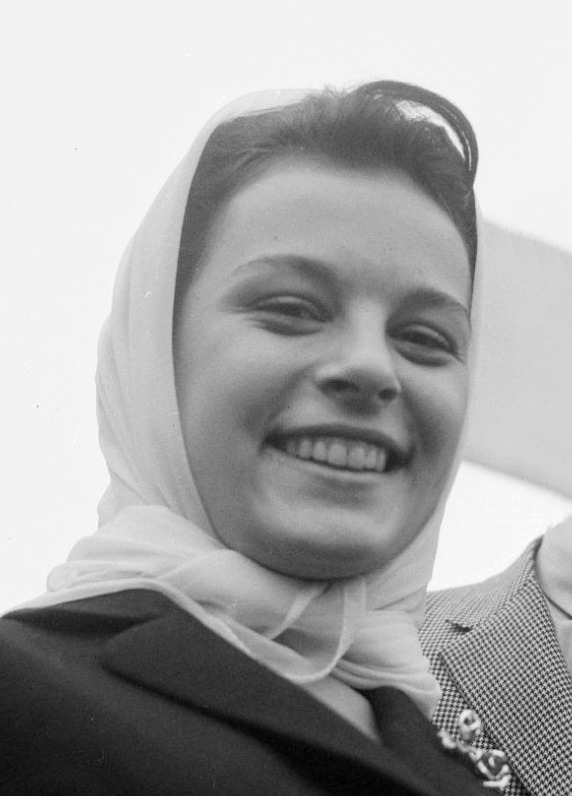
Hülya Koçyiğit

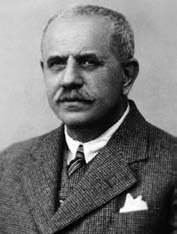
mehmet Naki Yücekök

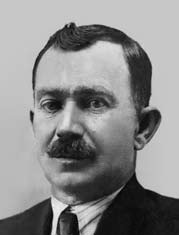
İhsan Eryavuz
