= 1954 in Turkey =

- Centuries: 20th; 21st
- Decades: 1930s; 1940s; 1950s; 1960s; 1970s
- See also: List of years in Turkey

Events in the year 1954 in Turkey.

== Parliament ==
- 9th Parliament of Turkey (up to 14 May)
- 10th Parliament of Turkey

== Incumbents ==
- President – Celal Bayar
- Prime Minister – Adnan Menderes
- Leader of the opposition – İsmet İnönü

== Ruling party and the main opposition ==
- Ruling party – Democrat Party (DP)
- Main opposition – Republican People's Party (CHP)

== Cabinet ==
- 20th government of Turkey (up to 17 May)
- 21st government of Turkey (from 17 May)

== Establishments ==
- Refik Restaurant is established by Refik Arslan.

== Events ==
- 27 January – Village Institutes were closed
- 27 January – Nation Party (MP) was closed
- 25 April – Mersin Harbor groundbreaking
- 2 may – General election, winner takes all system (DP 404, CHP 30, CMP 5 and Independents 7)
- 30 May – Kırşehir Province which voted for Republican Nation Party (CMP) was abolished by the government
- 14 June – Sakarya and Adıyaman Provinces were founded
- 20 July – Nevşehir Province was founded
- 26 November – Fire in the historical Grand Bazaar in Istanbul

== Births ==
- 26 February – Recep Tayyip Erdoğan, president
- 17 may – Belkis Akkale, singer
- 19 May – Nükhet Duru, singer
- 5 June – Haluk Bilginer, actor
- 21 June – Nur Sürer, actress
- 12 September – Zeynep Değirmencioğlu, actress
- 13 September – Serra Yılmaz, actress
- 17 September – Gülsin Onay, concert pianist
- 5 December – Gülşen Bubikoğlu, actress
- 31 December – Muhsin Yazıcıoğlu, leader of the Great Union Party

== Deaths ==
- 11 May – Sait Faik Abasıyanık, writer
- 23 March – Nakiye Elgün, one of the first female MPs in 1935
- 23 June – Salih Omurtak, former chief of staff
- 4 September – Ahmet Zeki Soydemir, retired general

== Gallery ==
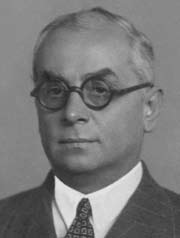
Celal Bayar

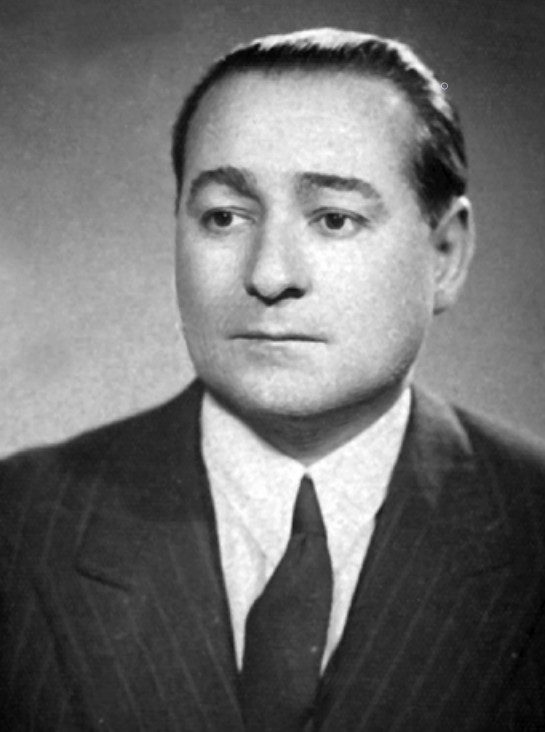
Adnan Menderes

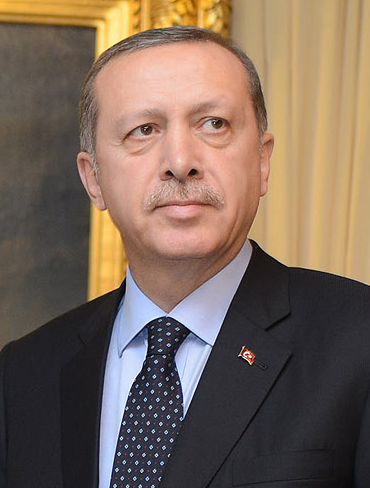
Recep Tayyip Erdoğan

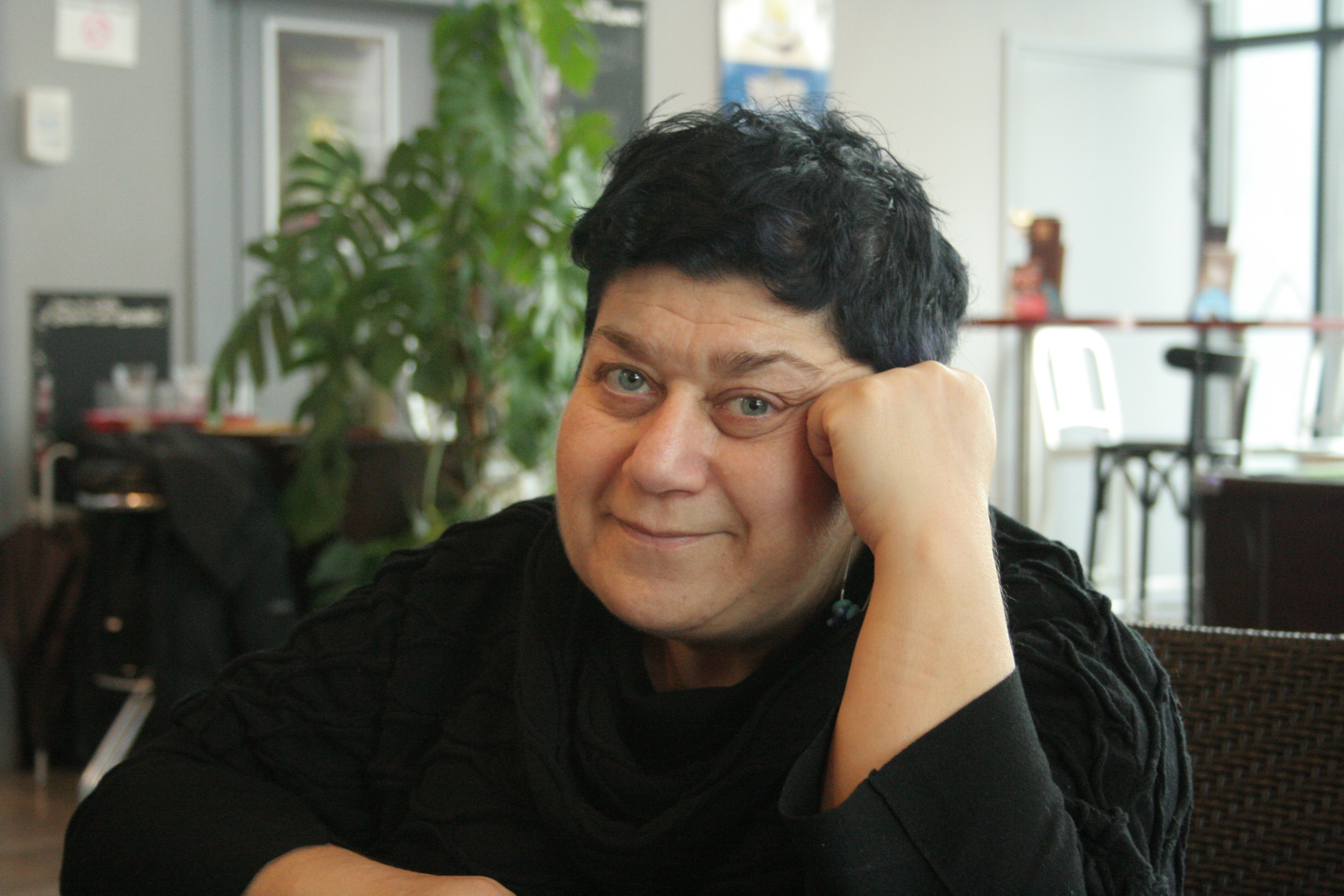
Serra Yılmaz

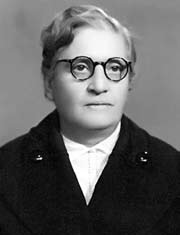
Nakiye Elgün

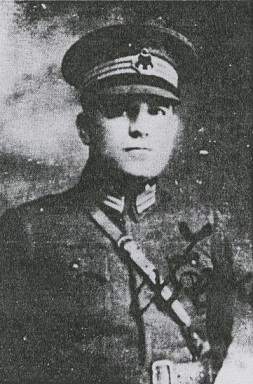
Ahmet Zeki Soydemir
