= 1945 in Turkey =

- Centuries: 20th; 21st
- Decades: 1920s; 1930s; 1940s; 1950s; 1960s
- See also: List of years in Turkey

Events in the year 1945 in Turkey.

== Parliament ==
- 7th Parliament of Turkey

== Incumbents ==
- President – İsmet İnönü
- Prime Minister – Şükrü Saracoğlu

== Ruling party ==
- Ruling party – Republican People's Party (CHP)

== Cabinet ==
- 14th government of Turkey

== Events ==
- 3 January – End of diplomatic relations with Japan.
- 10 January – Ottoman Turkish wording of the constitution was changed to modern Turkish (to be reverted in 1952)
- 23 February – Declaration of war against Germany and Japan
- 12 June – Motion with four signatures (Turkish: Dörtlü takrir) by Celal Bayar, Adnan Menderes, Refik Koraltan and Fuat Köprülü. Serious opposition in CHP
- 26 June – Turkey joined the United Nations
- 5 September – National Development Party was founded
- 21 October – Census (population 18,790,174)
- 20 November – Earthquake in Van

== Births ==
- 8 January – Kadir Topbaş, politician and architect (d. 2021)
- 5 April – Cem Karaca, singer (d. 2004)
- 20 June – Murat Sökmenoğlu, politician
- 22 June – Yaşar Nuri Öztürk, theologist and politician
- 15 November – Ferdi Tayfur, singer
- 20 November – Emel Sayın, singer
- 30 November – Ayşen Gruda, theatre actress

== Deaths ==
- 9 January – Osman Cemal Kaygılı (born in 1890), writer
- 27 March – Halit Ziya Uşaklıgil (born in 1866) writer
- 28 June – Yunus Nadi Abalıoğlu (born in 1879), journalist
- 22 September – Mürsel Bakü (born in 1881), retired general

== Gallery ==
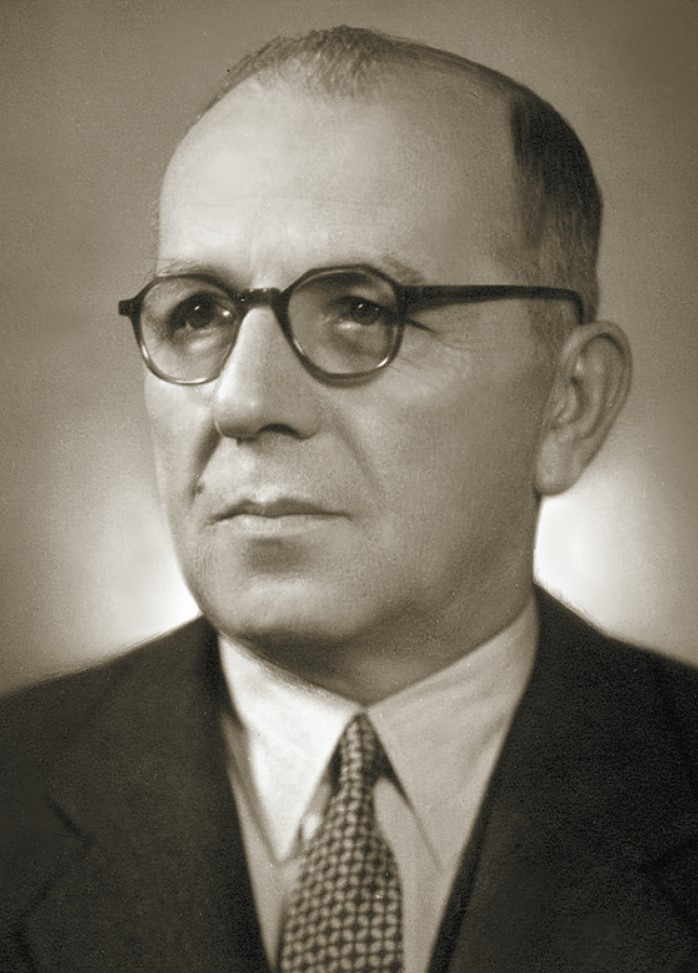
Şükrü Saracoğlu

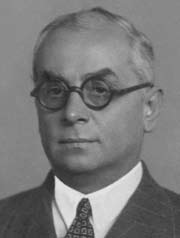
Celal Bayar

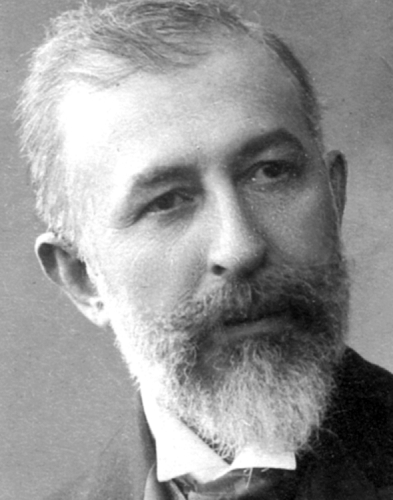
Halit Ziya Uşaklıgil

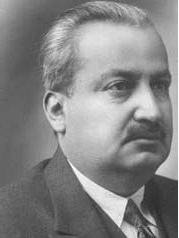
Yunus Nadi Abalıoğlu

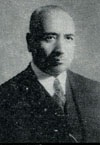
Mürsel Bakü

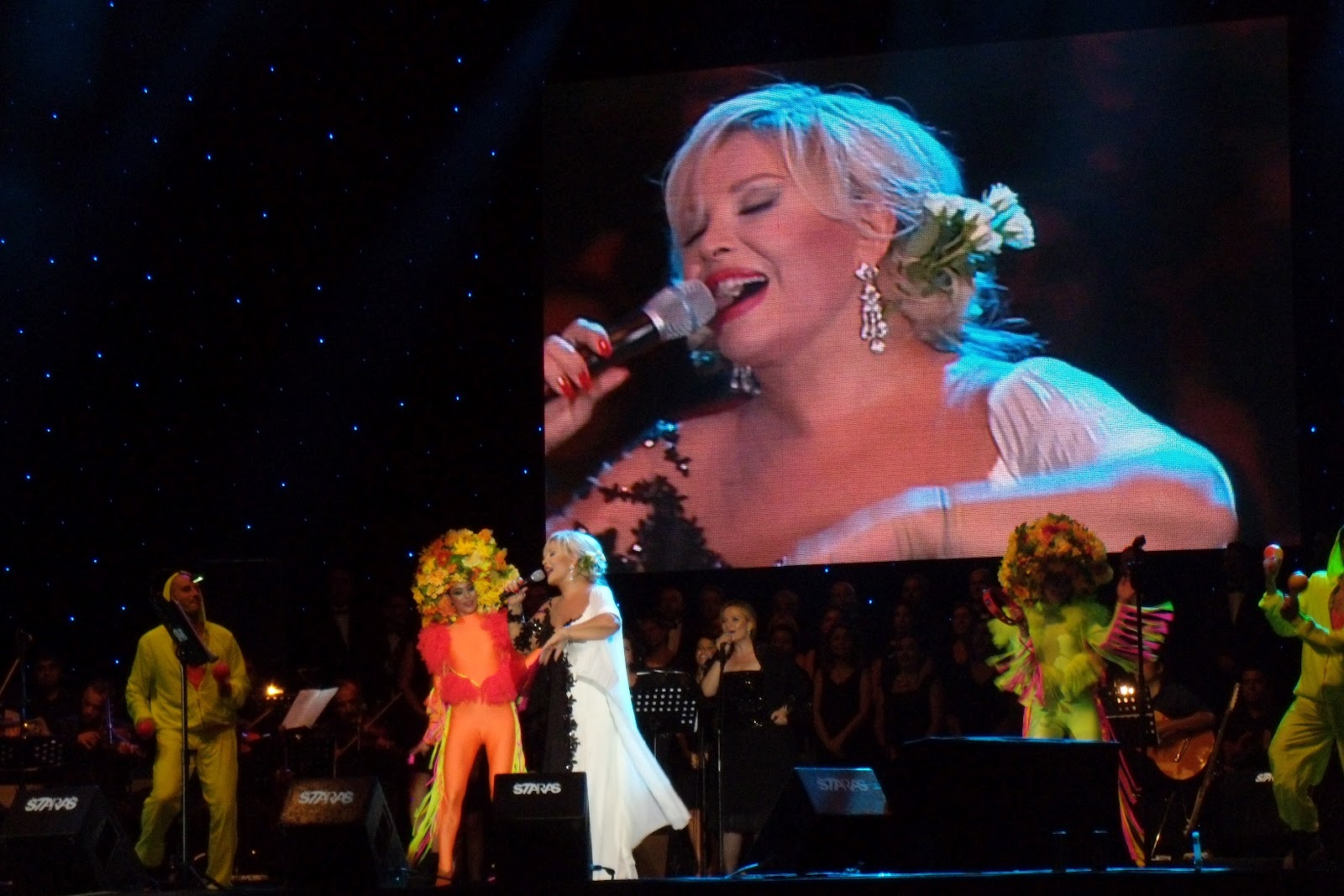
Emel Sayın
