= 1949 in Turkey =

- Centuries: 20th; 21st
- Decades: 1920s; 1930s; 1940s; 1950s; 1960s
- See also: List of years in Turkey

Events in the year 1949 in Turkey.

== Parliament ==
- 8th Parliament of Turkey

== Incumbents ==
- President – İsmet İnönü
- Prime Minister

Hasan Saka (up to 16 January)
Şemsettin Günaltay (from 16 January)

- Leader of the opposition – Celal Bayar

== Ruling party and the main opposition ==
- Ruling party – Republican People's Party (CHP)
- Main opposition – Democrat Party (DP)

== Cabinet ==
17th government of Turkey (up to 10 June)
18th government of Turkey (from 10 June)

== Events ==
- 14 January: Hasan Saka, the prime minister resigns.
- 24 January: Nationalistic poet Behçet Kemal Çağlar resigns from CHP, protesting Şemsettin Günaltay's cabinet and claiming that the secular principle of the party was sacrificed
- 1 February: Religion courses offered to primary school children.
- 24 March: Turkey grants de facto diplomatic recognition to Israel.
- 9 July: Fire in Çorum passenger ship leaves 61 dead.
- 8 August: Turkey admitted to Council of Europe.
- 17 August: 1949 Karlıova earthquake
- 15 October: By elections
- 16 November: Several members of the Nation Party were arrested on a fake assassination charge (It was claimed that they were planning to assassinate İsmet İnönü and Celal Bayar, but several days later they were released)

== Births ==
- 1 January – Vehbi Akdağ, wrestler (d. 2020)
- 10 January – Kemal Derviş, economist and politician
- 20 February – Adnan Kahveci, politician
- 25 February – Esmeray Diriker, singer
- 25 February – Sevil Atasoy, biochemist, forensic expert
- 21 March – Muammer Güler, politician
- 29 March – Kayahan Açar, singer
- 15 April – Kadir İnanır, actor
- 14 November – Güneş Taner, politician
- 13 December – Tarik Akan, actor
- 25 December – Mustafa Cengiz, businessman (died 2021)

== Deaths ==
- 21 February – Ali Çetinkaya (born 1878), politician
- 31 December – Rıza Tevfik Bölükbaşı (born 1869), philosopher and politician

== Gallery ==
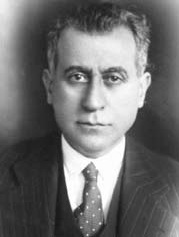
Hasan Saka

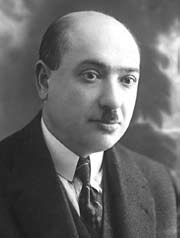
Şemsettin Günaltay

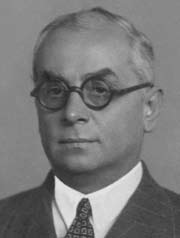
Celal Bayar

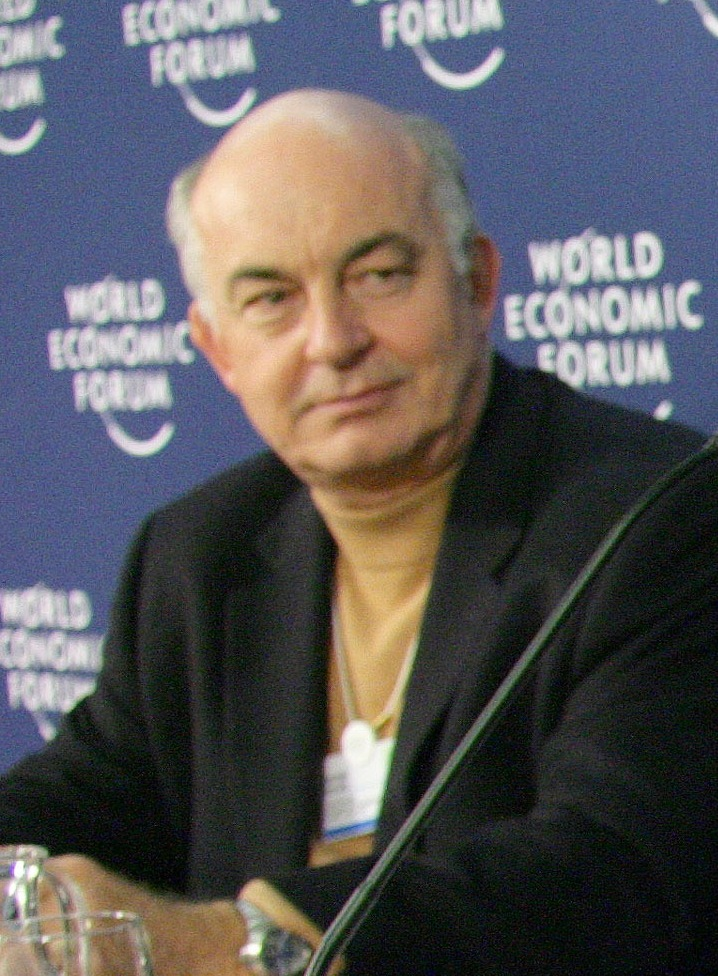
Kemal Derviş

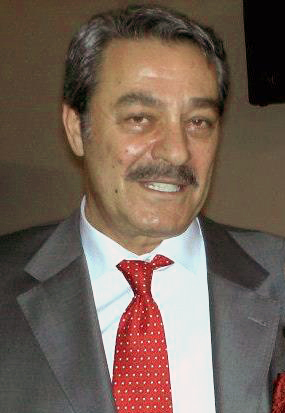
Kadir İnanır

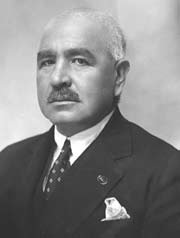
Ali Çetinkaya

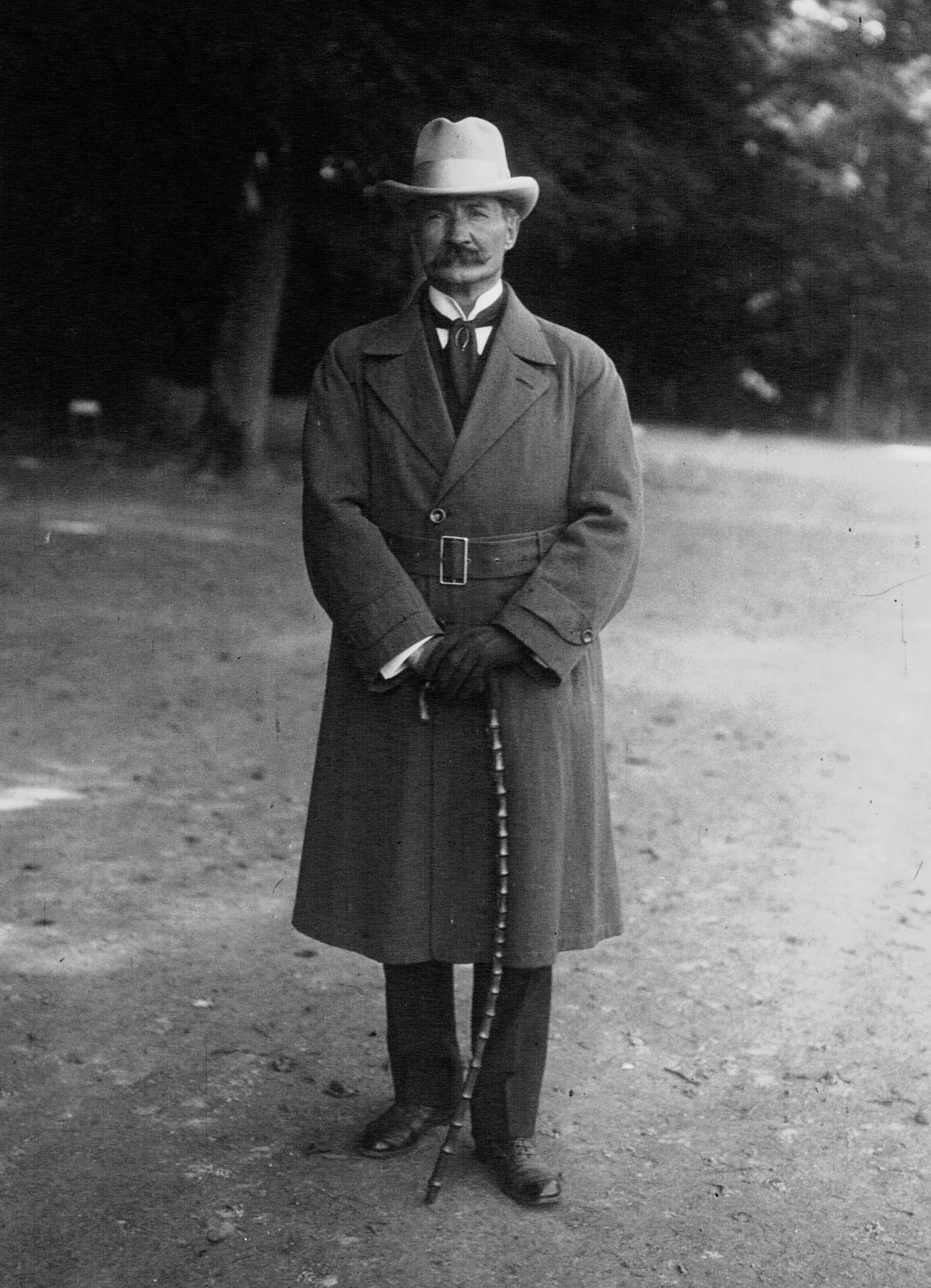
Rıza Tevfik Bölükbaşı
