= 1946 in Turkey =

- Centuries: 20th; 21st
- Decades: 1920s; 1930s; 1940s; 1950s; 1960s
- See also: List of years in Turkey

Events in the year 1946 in Turkey.

== Parliament ==
- 7th Parliament of Turkey (up to 5 August)
- 8th Parliament of Turkey

== Incumbents ==
- President – İsmet İnönü
- Prime Minister

Şükrü Saracoğlu ( up to 7 August)
Recep Peker (from 7 August)

- Leader of the opposition

Celal Bayar (from 7 January)

== Ruling party and the main opposition ==
- Ruling party – Republican People's Party (CHP)
- Main opposition – Democrat Party (DP)

== Cabinet ==
14th government of Turkey (up to 7 August)
15th government of Turkey (from 7 August)

== Events ==
- 7 January – Democrat Party (DP) was founded
- 29 March – Treaty with Iraq
- 5 April – USS Missouri (BB-63) carried the remains of the Turkish Ambassador to the United States, Münir Ertegün, from New York to İstanbul
- 31 May – 1946 Varto–Hınıs earthquake
- 21 July – General elections (CHP 396 seats, DP 61 seats, Independents7 seats)
- 8 August – Soviet Union proposed to change the status of the straits
- 21 October – Turkey rejected Soviet proposal
- 7 September – Devaluation
- 18 December – DP boycotted the parliament (ended on 26 December)

== Births ==
- 12 February – Ajda Pekkan, actress and singer
- 14 February – Kemal Unakıtan, politician
- 4 April – Ercan Yazgan, theatre actor
- 19 April – Duygu Asena, journalist
- 5 May – Aydın Menderes, Adnan Menderes’ son, politician
- 24 May – Tansu Çiller, prime minister (50th, 51st, and (52nd government of Turkey)
- 20 June – Zülfü Livaneli, musician, politician and journalist
- 3 August – Cahit Berkay, musician
- 10 November – Fikret Kızılok, singer
- 14 December – Oral Çalışlar, politician and journalist

== Deaths ==
- 9 July – Nevzat Tandoğan (born 1894, suicide) – governor of Ankara
- 26 November – Saffet Arıkan (born 1888), former government minister

== Gallery ==
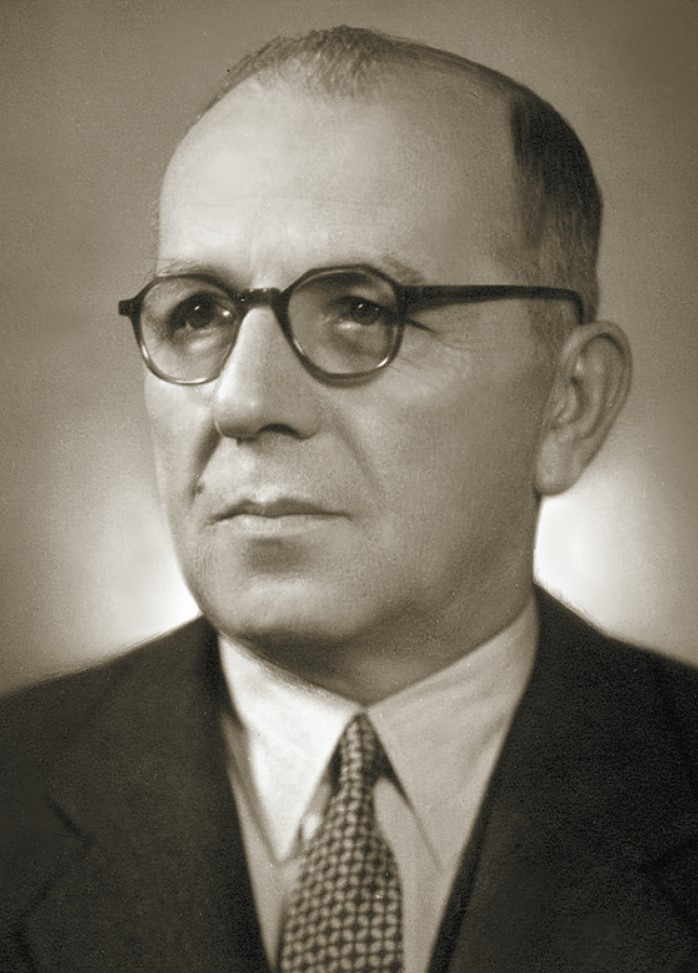
Şükrü Saracoğlu

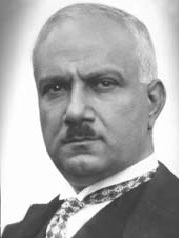
Recep Peker

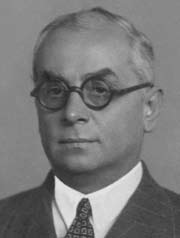
Celal Bayar

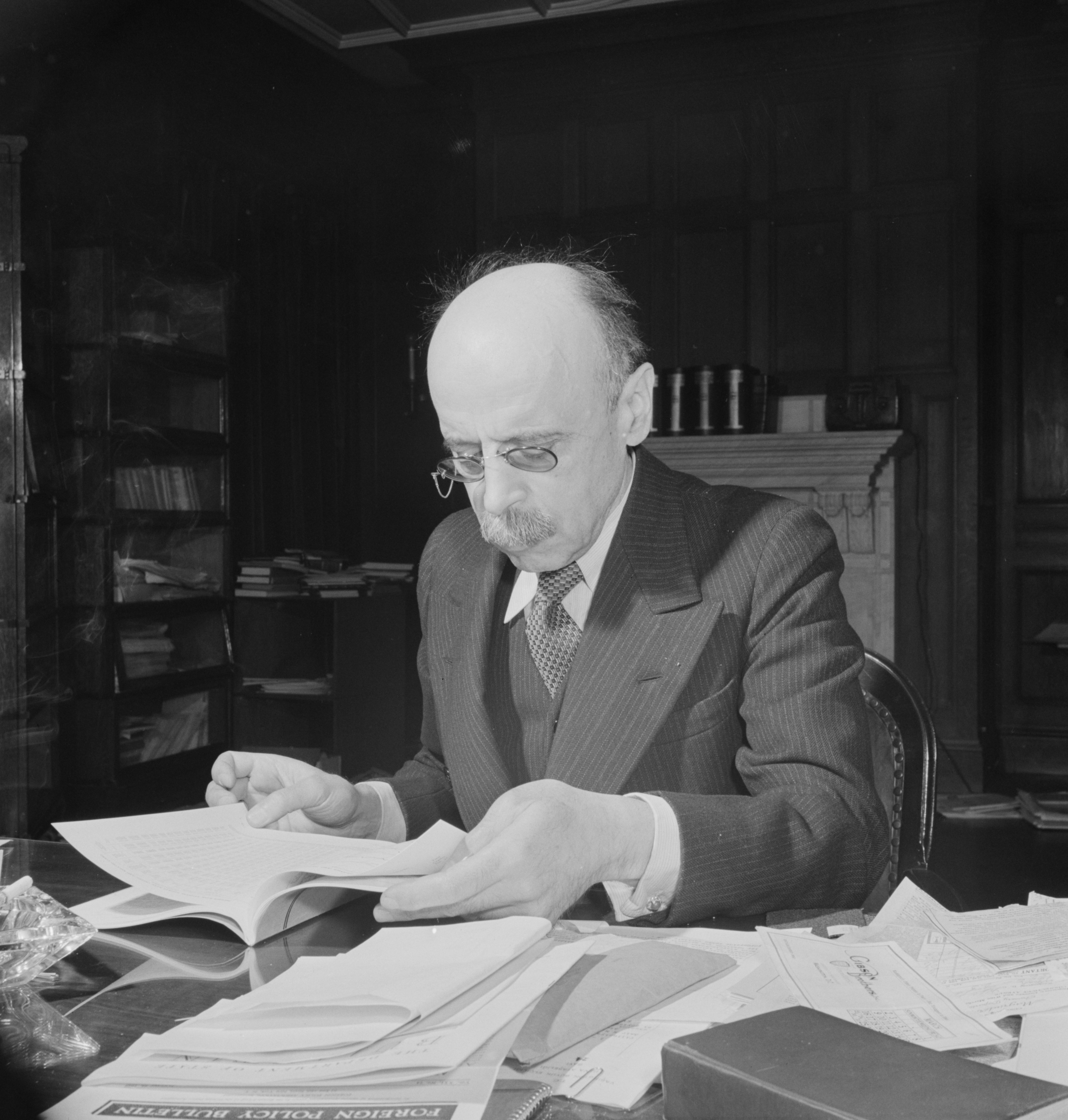
Münir Ertegün

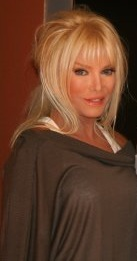
Ajda Pekkan

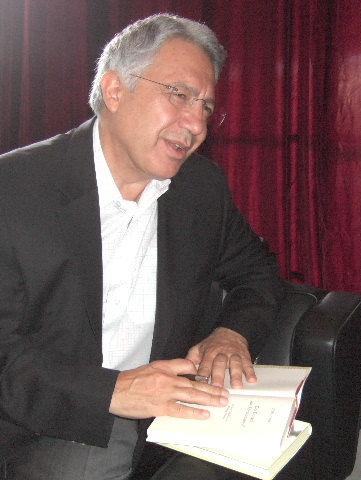
Zülfü Livaneli

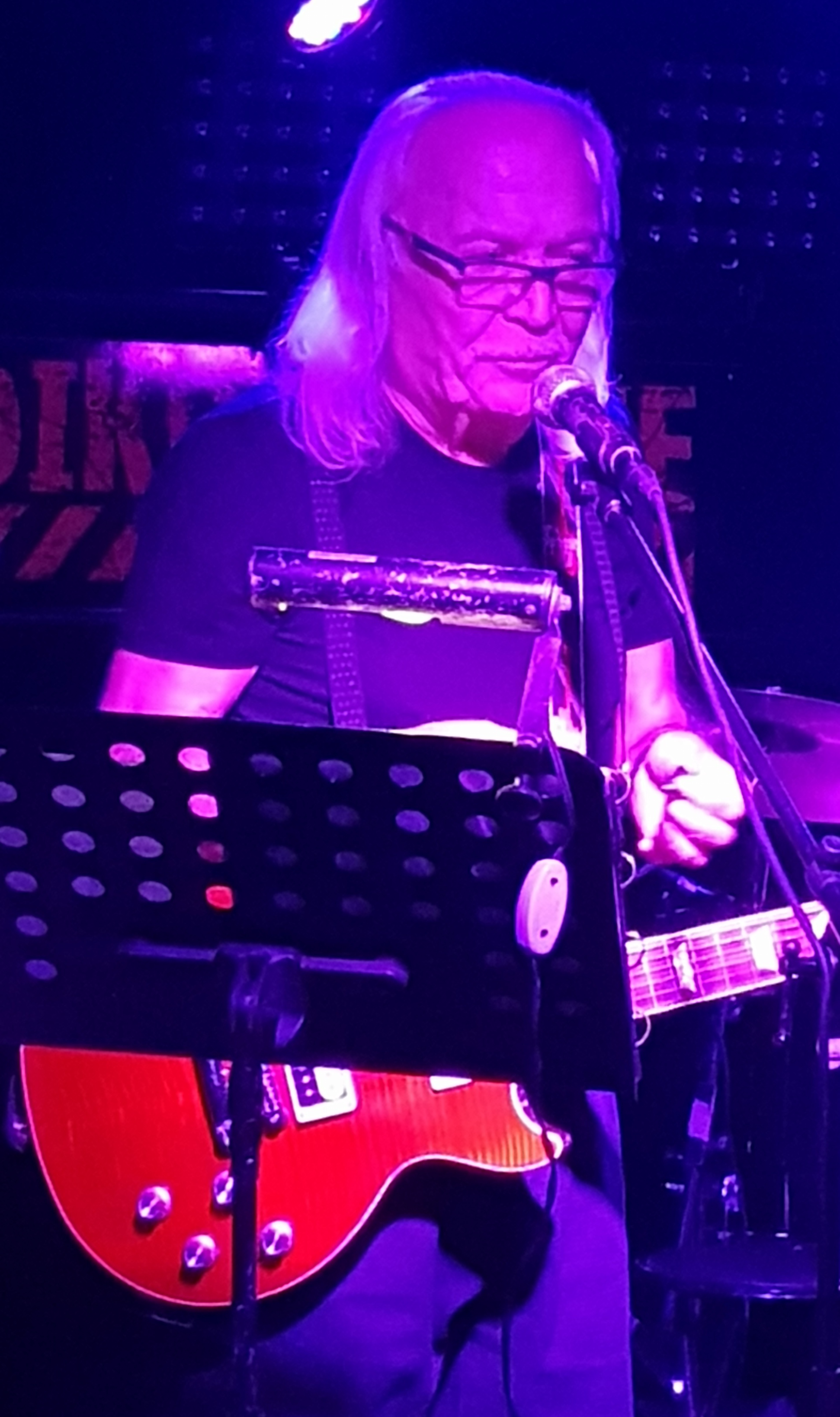
Cahit Berkay

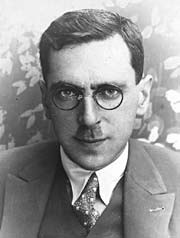
Nevzat Tandoğan

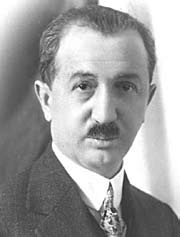
Saffet Arıkan
