= 1948 in Turkey =

- Centuries: 20th; 21st
- Decades: 1920s; 1930s; 1940s; 1950s; 1960s
- See also: List of years in Turkey

Events in the year 1948 in Turkey.

== Parliament ==
- 8th Parliament of Turkey

== Incumbents ==
- President – İsmet İnönü
- Prime Minister – Hasan Saka
- Leader of the opposition – Celal Bayar

== Ruling party and the main opposition ==
- Ruling party – Republican People's Party (CHP)
- Main opposition -Democrat Party (DP)

== Cabinet ==
16th government of Turkey (up to 10 June)
17th government of Turkey (from 10 June)

== Events ==
- 30 January – Akbank was founded
- 12 March – Earthquake around Kahramanmaraş.
- 1 May – Hürriyet newspaper began, its publication life
- 8 May – Prime minister Hasan Saka resigned because the policy of his cabinet towards the opposition was considered too mild. Nevertheless, he formed the next government.
- 4 July – Aid Turkey branch was founded
- 19 July – Nation Party was founded
- 17 October – By elections
- 10 December – Turkey became a member of UNESCO

== Births ==
- 1 March – Ertuğrul Günay, government minister
- 27 April – Nil Burak (Pembe Nihal Munsif), singer
- 31 May – Ahmet Vefik Alp, architect
- 24 June – Ayşe Soysal, female mathematician
- 12 September – Aziz Kocaoğlu, mayor of İzmir
- 20 October – Melih Gökçek, politician
- 17 December – Kemal Kılıçdaroğlu, chairman of the CHP

== Deaths ==
- 26 January – Kazım Karabekir (born 1882), retired general
- 8 March – Hulusi Behçet (born 1889), MD
- 2 April – Sabahattin Ali (born 1907) writer
- 30 June – Prens Sabahattin (born 1879), politician and sociologist
- 21 September – Çerkez Ethem (born 1886), former militia leader

== Gallery ==
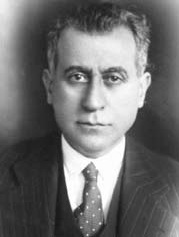
Hasan Saka

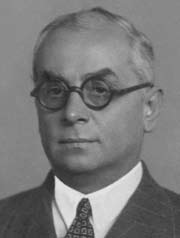
Celal Bayar

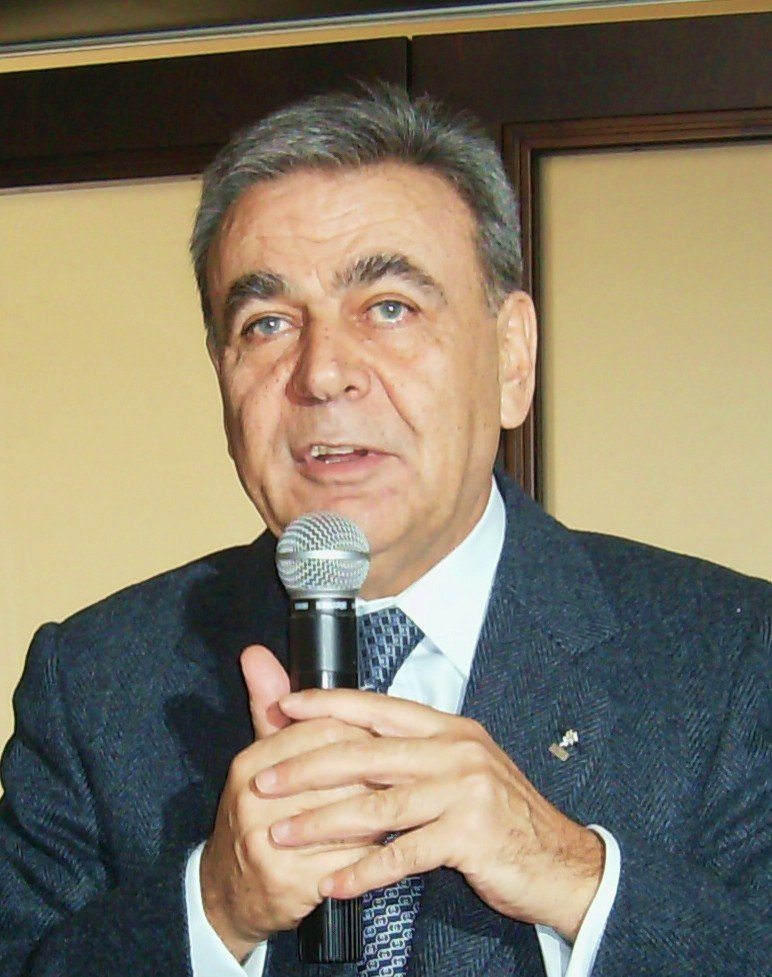
Aziz Kocaoğlu

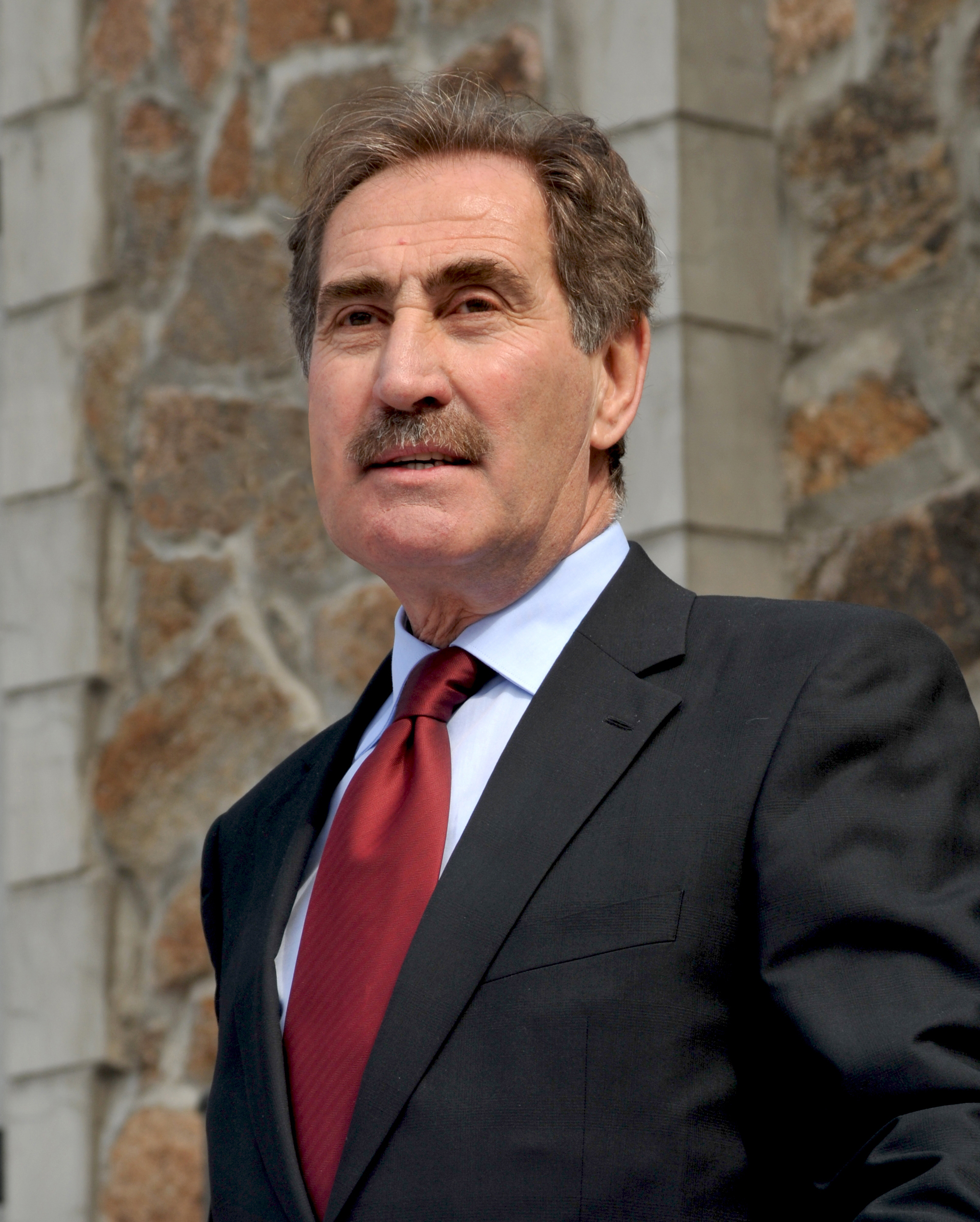
Ertuğrul Günay

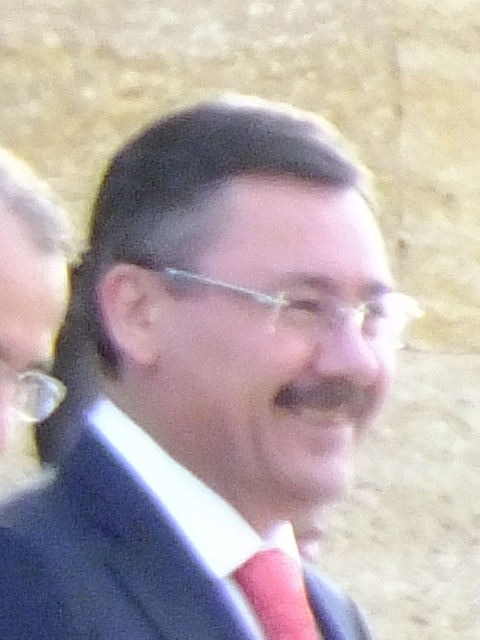
Melih Gökçek

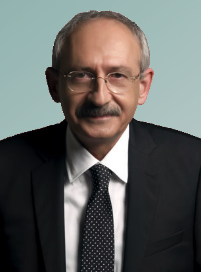
Kemal Kılıçdaroğlu

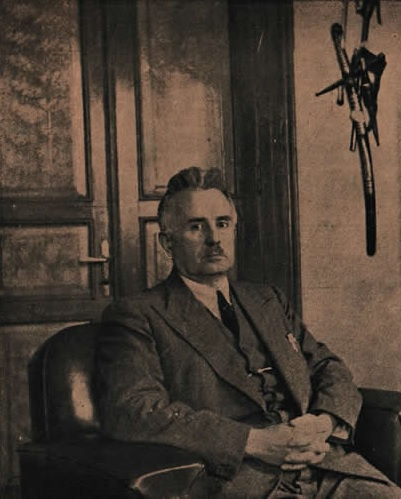
Kazım Karabekir

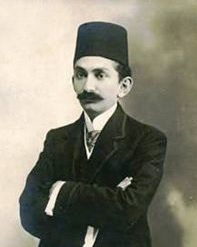
Prens Sabahattin

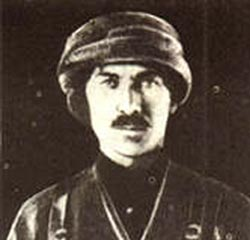
Çerkez Ethem

== See also ==
- Turkey at the 1948 Summer Olympics
- Turkey at the 1948 Winter Olympics
