= 1953 in Turkey =

- Centuries: 20th; 21st
- Decades: 1930s; 1940s; 1950s; 1960s; 1970s
- See also: List of years in Turkey

Events in the year 1953 in Turkey.

== Parliament ==
- 9th Parliament of Turkey

== Incumbents ==
- President – Celal Bayar
- Prime Minister – Adnan Menderes
- Leader of the opposition – İsmet İnönü

== Ruling party and the main opposition ==
- Ruling party – Democrat Party (DP)
- Main opposition – Republican People's Party (CHP)

== Cabinet ==
- 20th government of Turkey

== Events ==
- 21 January – The first agreement with a US firm about oil exploration in Turkey
- 25 February – Nonaggression and Friendship Pact signed with Greece and Yugoslavia.
- 18 March – 1953 Yenice–Gönen earthquake
- 4 April – TCG Dumlupınar submarine collided with a Swedish freighter and sank (81 deaths)
- 28/29 May – Heavy casualties of the Turkish brigade during the Battle of the Hook in Korea
- 18 June – Earthquake around Edirne
- 16 August – House of the Virgin Mary, close to Ephesus was opened to visits
- 10 November – Atatürk’s body was transferred to its final resting place (Anıtkabir) on his death day
- 14 December – All property and the furniture of CHP, the main opposition party was confiscated

== Births ==
- 3 January – Fikri Karadağ, retired colonel
- 11 January – Mehmet Altan, economist, writer
- 20 January – Alaattin Çakıcı, former member of Grey Wolves
- 23 February – Adnan Polat, business man
- 1 March – Sinan Çetin, film director and producer
- 29 March – Güher and Süher Pekinel sisters, pianists
- 7 April – Fatih Erkoç, singer
- 4 September – Fatih Terim, footballer, coach

== Deaths ==
- 28 January – Neyzen Tevfik, ney player and satirist
- 5 February – Halit Akmansü, retired officier who participated in the Turkish War of Independence
- 22 September – Necmettin Sadak, former foreign minister
- 11 December – Sedat Simavi, journalist and founder of Hürriyet newspaper
- 27 December – Şükrü Saracoğlu, former prime minister (13th and 14th government of Turkey)

== Gallery ==
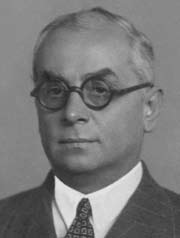
Celal Bayar

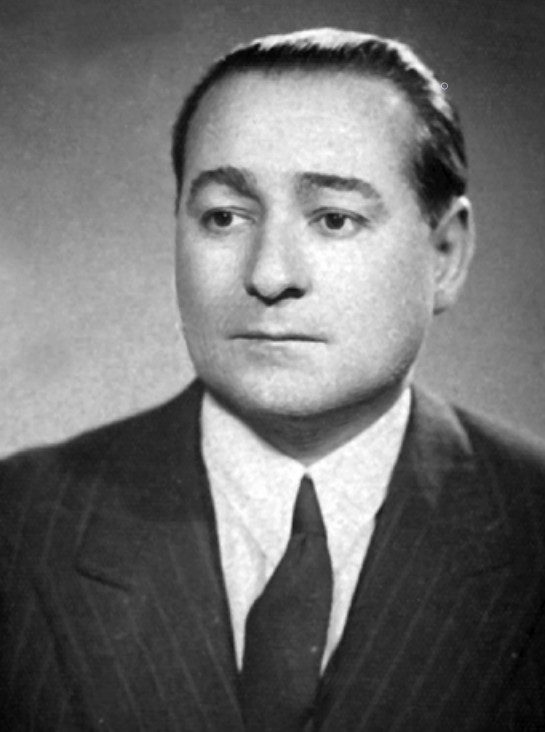
Adnan Menderes

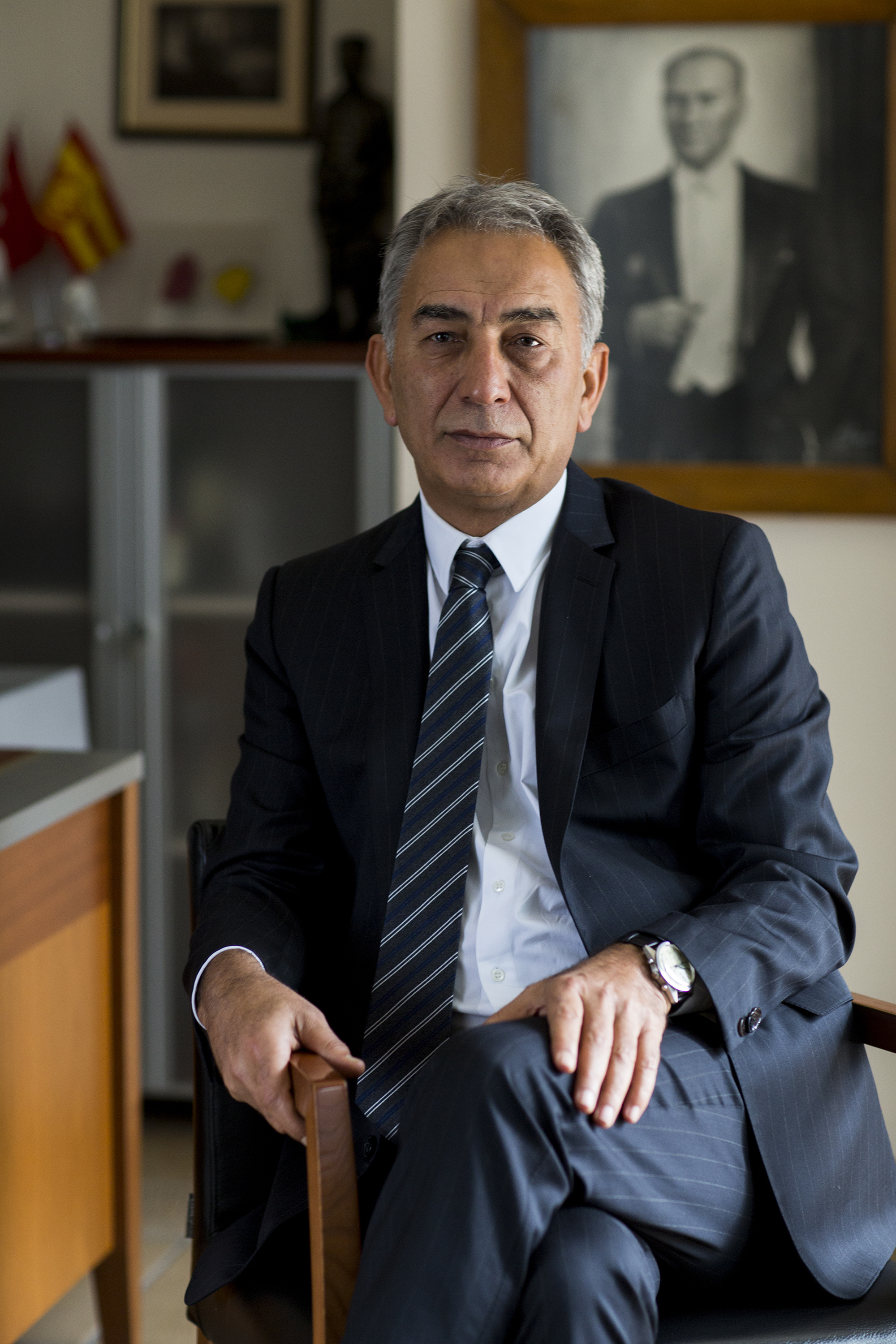
Adnan Polat

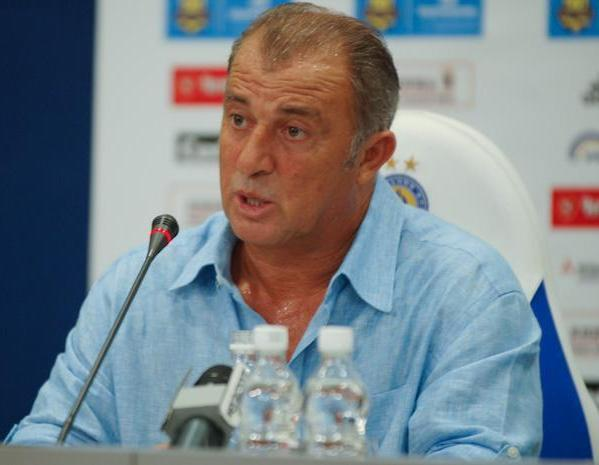
Fatih Terim

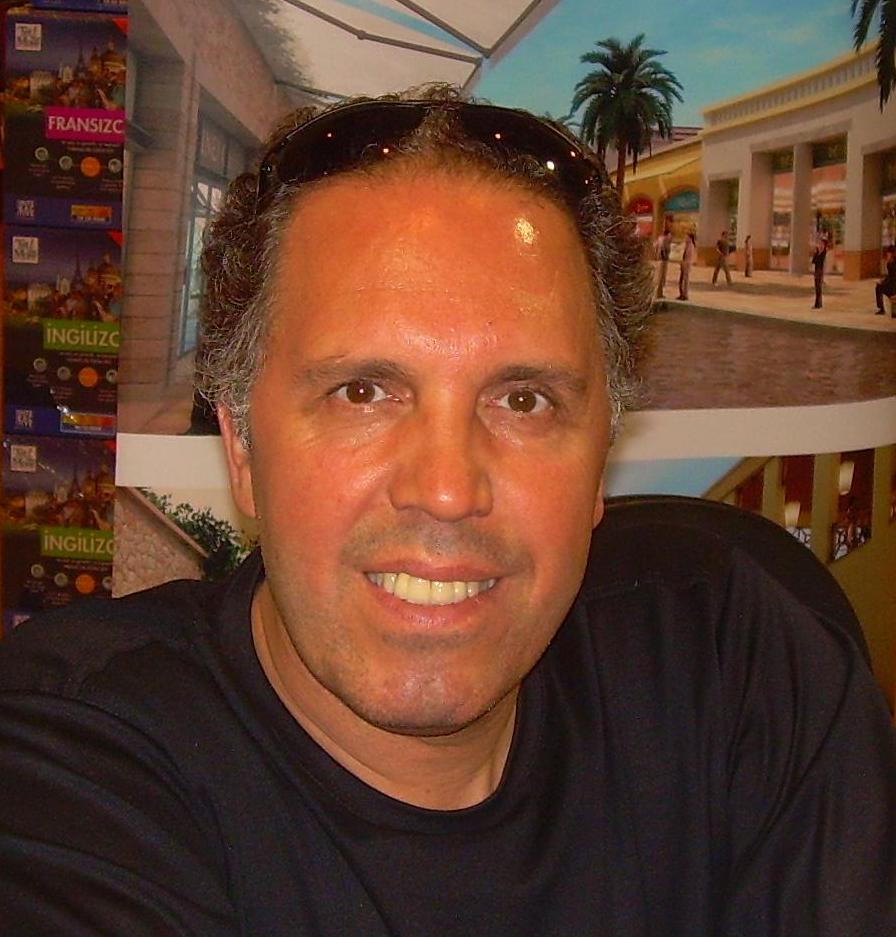
Fatih Erkoç

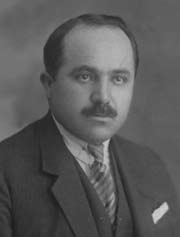
Halit Akmansü

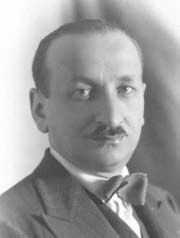
Necmettin Sadak

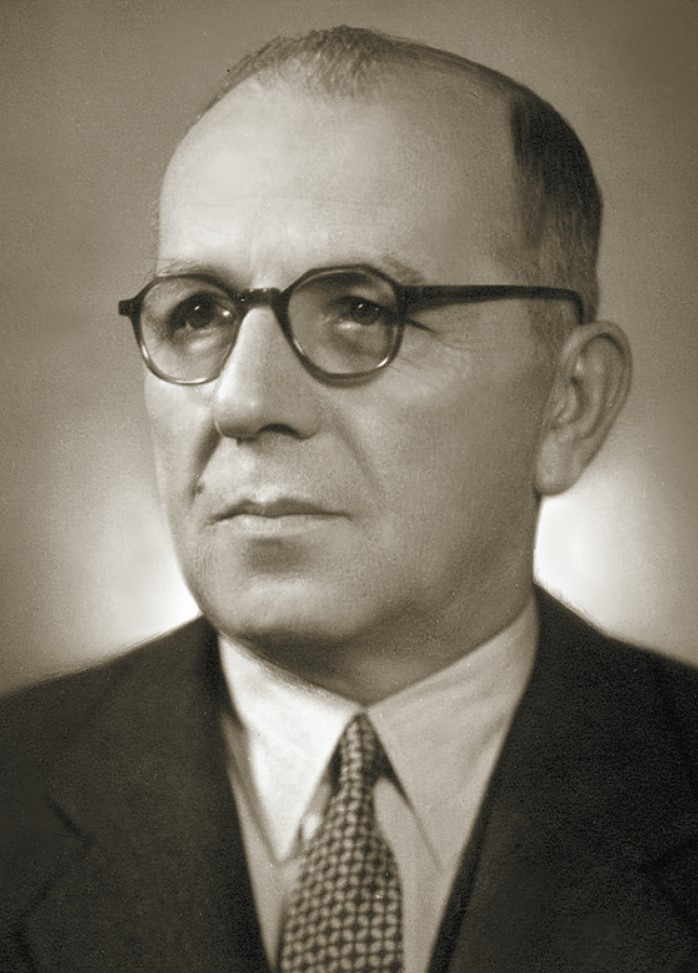
Şükrü Saracoğlu
