= Suzan Kahramaner =

Turkish mathematician

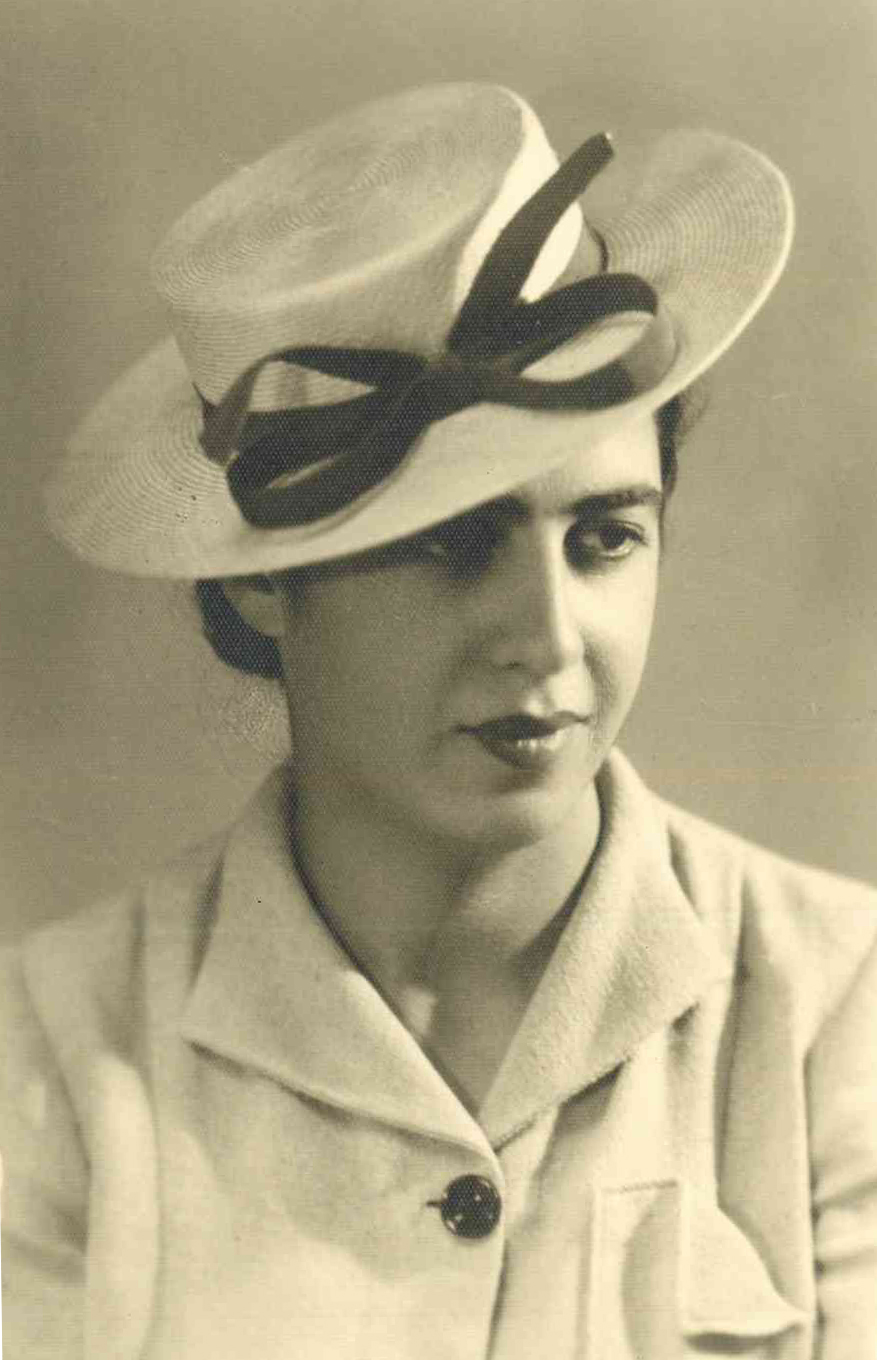
- Born: May 21, 1913; Istanbul, Ottoman Empire
- Died: February 22, 2006 (aged 92); Istanbul, Turkey
- Education: Istanbul University
- Awards: Jyvaskyla University medal War of Independence Sword
- Scientific career
- Fields: Mathematics
- Workplaces: Istanbul University
- Doctoral advisor: Kerim Erim

Suzan Kahramaner (May 21, 1913 – February 22, 2006) was one of the first female mathematicians in Turkish academia.

== Education ==
Kahramaner was born in Üsküdar, in Istanbul. Her mother was Müzeyyen Hanım, the daughter of Halep's district treasurer, and her father was surgeon Dr. Rifki Osman Bey. She studied at the Moda Nümune Inas primary school between 1919 and 1924. After enrolling in Notre Dame De Sion in 1924, she completed her secondary education and obtained her French bachelor's degree in 1934.

In the aftermath of the higher education reforms conducted in 1933 in Istanbul Darülfunun, which was the only institution of higher education in the country, was modernized and renamed Istanbul University. Kahramaner began her graduate studies in 1934 in the Mathematics-Astronomy Department of Istanbul University. In addition to its renewed curricula and evolving faculty, Istanbul University housed the scientific research of many famous German academics that had fled from the pre-World War II Germany.

During her undergraduate studies, she took classes taught by many famous mathematicians, including Ali Yar, Kerim Erim, Richard von Mises, Hilda Geiringer and William Prager.

In 1939, Kahramaner graduated from the Department of Mathematics and Astronomy in Istanbul University, which had previously housed great academic merit through its successful scholars. She undertook research projects in the field of physics between the years 1939 and 1940.

In 1943, she started her doctorate studies on Coefficient Problems in the Theory of Complex Functions with the advisor Kerim Erim, the first mathematician in Turkey with a doctoral degree, who had completed his doctorate studies in Friedrich-Alexander University in Germany with his advisor Adolf Hurwitz. Kerim Erim was also the first scientist to direct a doctoral study in mathematics in Turkey. Kahramaner's doctoral thesis was entitled, Sur les fonctions analytiques qui prénnent la même valeur ou des valeurs donnés (ou en m points donnés).

== Career ==
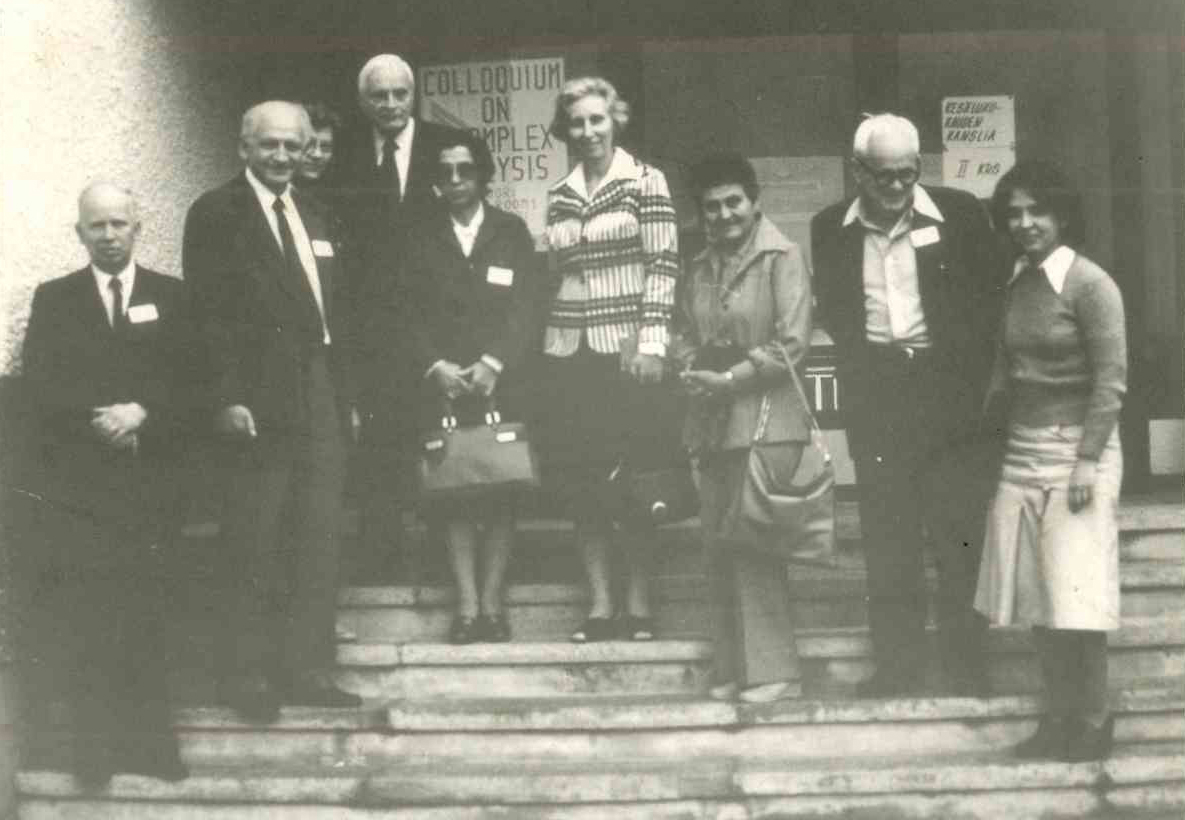
Suzan Kahramaner

At the beginning of the 1940–1941 academic year, since teachers at the time were not appointed to Istanbul but were instead appointed to other cities in Turkey, she started working as an assistant teacher in Çamlıca High School for Girls and worked as a mathematics teacher there until 1943. In 1943, she worked as a teaching assistant for the Analysis I and Analysis II courses in the Mathematics Department of the Faculty of Science in Istanbul University. After her doctoral thesis was approved, Kahramaner continued her scientific and academic studies in Istanbul University as one of the first woman mathematicians in Turkey with a PhD in Mathematics.

She wrote the thesis, Sur l'argument des fonctions univalentes for her Assistant Professorship and was consequently titled assistant professor the same year after she successfully passed the necessary exams. She was sent to Rolf Nevanlinna to Helsinki University for a year in January 1957 in order to do research on the Theory of Complex Functions. She participated in the Scandinavian Congress of Mathematicians, International Colloquium on the Theory of Functions, in Helsinki the very same year in August and had the opportunity to meet some of the famous mathematicians like Ernst Hölder, Wilhelm Blaschke, Lars Valerian Ahlfors, Paul Montel, Olli Lehto, Mieczysław Biernacki, Alexander Gelfond, Albert Pfluger, Wilfred Kaplan, Walter Hayman and Paul Erdős.

In November 1957, she went to Zurich to continue her scientific research for approximately a year at Zurich University, where Rolf Nevanlinna was lecturing. In August 1958, she attended the International Congress of Mathematicians in Edinburgh held by the International Mathematical Union, where the Fields Medals were awarded to their recipients.

She returned to Istanbul University at the end of 1958. In the autumn of 1959, she won the NATO Scholarship, to which she had applied with a reference from Rolf Nevanlinna and with this scholarship; she worked at Zurich University during 1959–1960.

Afterwards, she conducted scientific research at Stanford University for a month. She continued her research the same year in September at Helsinki University. She returned to her duty in Istanbul University at the end of October 1960.

She participated to the International Congress of Mathematicians held in Stockholm in August 1962. She did her research at the Helsinki University and Zurich University in September and October in the same year. In August 1966, she was invited to the II. Rolf Nevanlinna Colloquium. In August 1966, she joined the International Congress of Mathematicians (ICM) in Moscow. After the congress, she carried out her studies at Helsinki University in September and October in order to complete her professorship thesis.

Her professorship thesis, entitled Sur les singularites d'une application différentiable was accepted in 1968 and she received the title of professor the same year. She conducted scientific studies at various universities in London, Paris, Zurich and Nice in 1970. She attended the International Congress of Mathematicians in Nice in 1970.

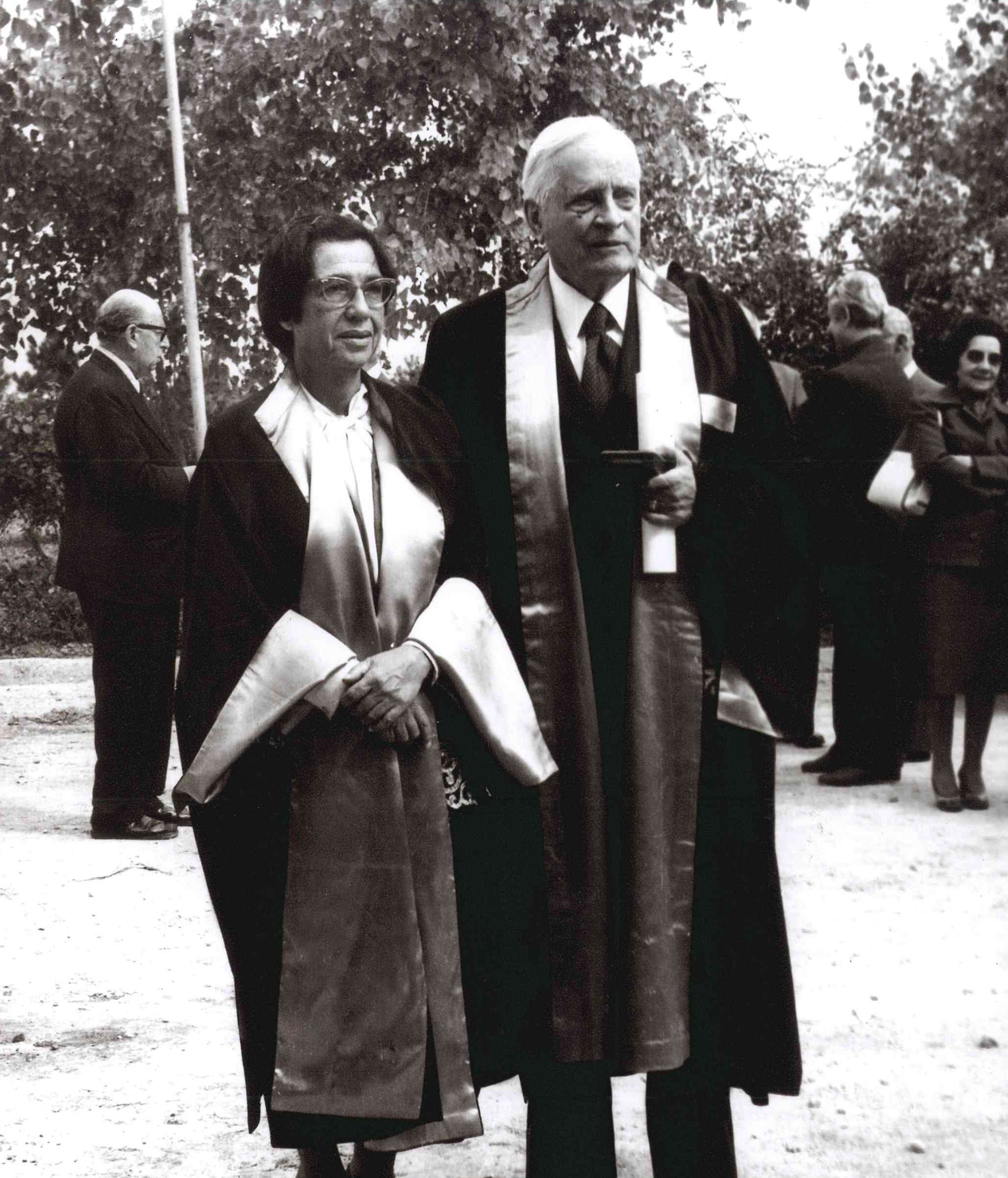
Suzan Kahramaner and Rolf Nevanlinna.

She also contributed to the founding of Balkan Union of Mathematicians, which was realized with the participation of Romania, Yugoslavia, Greece, Bulgaria and Turkey in the same year. She participated to the Balkan Union of Mathematicians in Athens in 1971. She also participated to the congress organized by the Balkan Union of Mathematicians in September 1971.

In May and July 1973, O. Lehto, Menahem Max Schiffer, O. Tammi, Cevdet Kocak and H. Minc visited her and conducted scientific research with her. She joined the Seminar and International Symposium on Functions Theory of Silivri Institute of Research on Mathematics in 1976. In this symposium, Rolf Nevanlinna was given the title of Honoris Causa. In the same year, she was awarded the Jyvaskyla University (Finland) medal. She joined the conference organized in Varna in 1977 by the Balkan Union of Mathematicians. In 1978, she also participated to the International Congress of Mathematicians in Helsinki and Rolf Nevanlinna Colloquium in Joensuu. She was the head of the Department of Mathematics between 1978 and 1979 in Istanbul University.

Kahramaner was the PhD supervisor of Ahmet Dernek, Rıfkı Kahramaner and Yasar Polatoglu and, co-supervisor of Semin Akdogan.

In the beginning of 1983, Kahramaner retired from Istanbul University after forty years in academia due to her age. During her retirement, she continued her scientific research. In August 1987, she attended the Rolf Nevanlinna Colloquium in Leningrad.

== Selected publications ==
Kahramaner, who was proficient in English, French, German, Turkish and Arabic, wrote countless scientific studies, some of which are:

- Sur les fonctions analytiques qui prénnent la meme valeur ou des valeurs données en deux points donnés (ou en m points donnés), Revue de la faculté des sciences de l'université d'Istanbul, Série A, Vol. 20, 1955.
- Ein verzerrungssatz des argumentes der schlichten funktionen, (with Nazim Terzioglu) Revue de la faculté des sciences de l'université d'Istanbul, Série A, Vol. 20, 1955.
- Über das argument der anlytischen funktionen, (with Nazim Terzioglu) Revue de la faculté des sciences de l'université d'Istanbul, Série A, Vol. 21, 1956.
- Sur le comportement d'une représentation presque-conforme dans le voisinage d'un point singulier, Revue de la faculté des sciences de l'université d'Istanbul, Série A, Vol. 22, 1957.
- Sur les applications différentiables du plan complexe, Revue de la faculté des sciences de l'université d'Istanbul, Série A, Vol. 26, 1961.
- Sur les coefficients des fonctions univalents, Revue de la faculté des sciences de l'université d'Istanbul, Série A, Vol. 28, 1962.
- Modern Mathematical Methods and Models Volume I: Multicomponent Methods (A Book of Experimental Text Materials), (Translation from The Dartmouth College Writing Group; E.J. Cogan, R.L. Davis, J. G. Kemeny, R.Z. Norman, J.L. Snell and G.L. Thompson) Malloy Inc., Ann Arbor, Michigan, ABD, 1958.
- Sur l'argument des fonctions univalentes, Revue de la faculté des sciences de l'université d'Istanbul, Série A, Vol. 32, 1967.

== Awards and honors ==
Kahramaner was awarded the War of Independence Sword by the Halic Rotary Club in the 75th celebration of the Turkish Republic.

== Personal ==
Kahramaner died in Istanbul, on Wednesday, February 22, 2006.

Kahramaner's son H. Rifki Kahramaner and her daughter-in-law Yasemin Kahramaner are also both mathematics professors.
