= Mazhar Osman Usman =

Turkish psychiatrist and neurologist

Mazhar Osman
- Born: 5 May 1884, Sofulu
- Died: 31 August 1951 (aged 67), Istanbul
- Occupations: Doctor, psychiatrist, neurologist

Mazhar Osman Usman (born 5 May 1884, Soufli - 31 August 1951, Istanbul) was a Turkish psychiatrist and neurologist which founded the first modern psychiatric hospital in Turkey. In 1904, Mazhar Osman graduated from the "Military Medical School" with the rank of captain and became a doctor, and started working as an assistant teacher at the "Gülhane Military Hospital Mental Health Service". In 1909 and 1911, he traveled to Germany twice for educational purposes. In Munich he studied with Alzheimer and Kraepelin, the most important names of modern psychiatry, and in Berlin with Ziehen. He returned to Gülhane, and in 1914 he became the chief physician and director of the "Mental Diseases Müşahedehane" in Haseki.

Later, he was appointed as the "Haydarpaşa Military Hospital" Mental and Asabiye Specialization. Mazhar Osman demanded from the state the land where the Reşadiye Barracks, an abandoned barracks in Bakırköy, was located. The process, which started in 1924 with the approval of then President Mustafa Kemal Atatürk, Prime Minister İsmet İnönü and Minister of Interior Refik Saydam, was completed with the establishment of Bakırköy Mental and Nervous Diseases Hospital on June 15, 1927. Mazhar Osman served as Chief Physician at the hospital for a long time. In 1933, he was appointed as Ordinary Professor at Istanbul University Psychiatry Clinic. In 1941, he left his position as Chief Physician and continued to work as a faculty member until 1951, when he retired.

In addition to the Turkish Society of Neuropsychiatry, Mazhar Osman was the founder of health associations such as the Society for the Struggle Against Drunkenness and wrote various professional works such as Nervous Diseases (1935–1936, 2 volumes) and Pleasurable Poisons (1934). He was elected as an honorary member of foreign health organizations such as the Hamburg Society of Mental Diseases, the French Neurological Society and the New York Academy of Neurology. He played an important role in establishing serology, neuro-pathology and experimental psychology laboratories for the first time in Turkey.

He died in 1951. His grave is in Zincirlikuyu Cemetery.

Bakırköy Psychiatric Hospital was also known as "Mazhar Osman Hospital" for a period.

== See also ==
- Bakırköy Psychiatric Hospital
- Psychiatry
- Psychiatric diseases
