= Mehmet Naki Yücekök =

Turkish politician

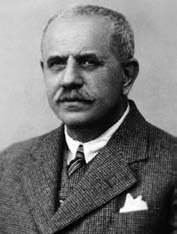
- Born: 1866; Nasliç (Neapoli), Ottoman Empire
- Died: 2 February 1947 (aged 80–81); Büyükada, Turkey
- Burial place: Edirnekapı Şehitliği
- Military career
- Allegiance: Ottoman Empire
- Service years: November 1886–September 8, 1914
- Rank: Colonel
- Commands: 3rd Battalion of the 35th Regular Regiment, 43rd Redif Regiment, 51st Regiment
- Conflicts: Balkan Wars
- Other work: Director of Reji in Giresun; Director of the 1st Department of the Monopoly General Directorate; Member of the GNAT (Elâziz); Member of the GNAT (Muş)

Mehmet Naki Yücekök also known as Nakiyüddin Yücekök, Nakiyüddin Bey (1866; Nasliç (Neapoli) - 2 February 1947; Istanbul) was a Turkish career officer, politician and secularist. He served as a military officer of the Ottoman Army and as a politician of the Republic of Turkey. He was a French teacher of Mustafa Kemal at the Salonica Military School.
