= Nur Batur =

Turkish journalist (born 1952)

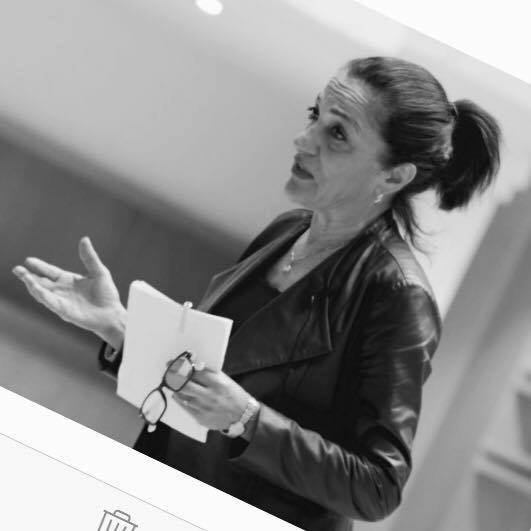
- Born: 11 September 1952 (age 73); İzmir, Turkey
- Education: Gazi University
- Occupation: Journalist
- Years active: 1970s-present
- Known for: Interviews with politicians
- Children: 2

Nur Batur (born 11 September 1952) is a Turkish journalist who has worked for various media outlets, including Anadolu Agency, Milliyet, Hürriyet and CNN Türk. She is known for her interviews with the political figures.

== Early life and education ==
Batur was born in İzmir on 11 September 1952. She graduated from TED College in Ankara in 1970 and obtained a degree in communication from Gazi University.

== Career and activities ==
Following her graduation Batur joined the Anadolu Agency in 1976 and worked as a parliamentary and foreign policy correspondent. In 1980, she was awarded the United Nations's Dag Hammorjold scholarship and went to New York City where she made news and interviews about the work of the United Nations General Assembly and the United Nations Security Council. On her return to Turkey, she began to work for Tercüman newspaper. She also worked for TRT, BBC, Voice of America and Voice of Germany radio stations.

Then Batur worked for the Milliyet and Hürriyet newspapers publishing articles on domestic politics and foreign policy. After serving as the representative of Hürriyet in Greece, she also served as its Ankara representative. During her tenure in Greece Batur argued that for Turkey the Kardak islets were not worth fighting for. In 1994, in addition to working as Kanal D's Ankara deputy representative and news director, she produced and presented a news program entitled Eksen (Turkish: Axis). In the following years, she produced and presented news programs and documentaries on the CNN Türk TV channel. She also wrote for Sabah newspaper and was removed from her post in 2014.

Batur conducted the last interview with Benazir Bhutto, Pakistani politician, in Dubai just before the assassination of Bhutto. Batur has made many interviews with leading political figures, including Yasser Arafat, Tony Blair, Costas Simitis, Heydar Aliyev, Lech Wałęsa, Saddam Hussein, Tariq Aziz, Rauf Denktaş, Václav Klaus, Mahmoud Abbas, Javier Solana, Jalal Talabani, and Masoud Barzani.

As of 2022 Batur was the author of six books on politics.

Batur participates in several programs on various television and radio channels. She teaches at Bahçeşehir University.

== Personal life ==
Batur is married and has two children.

== Awards ==
Batur was named by the Turkish Journalists' Association as the journalist of the year in 1986, 1987 and 1989. She is the recipient of the International Peace and Friendship Award in 2004. She was given the Golden Person of the Year award in the category of television and journalism on the occasion of the 84th anniversary of the Republic of Turkey in 2008.
