= Osman Cemal Kaygılı =

Turkish writer and journalist (1890-1945)

Osman Cemal Kaygılı (Turkish: Osman Cemal Kaygılı) (4 October 1890, in Istanbul – 9 January 1945) was a Turkish writer and journalist.

He started writing at Eşek (Note: Eşek) magazine in 1910. In 1925 he started teaching Turkish language at Istanbul Imam Hatip school (Note: İstanbul İmam Hatip Okulu) and later at Çemberlitaş Boys' School. (Note: Çemberlitaş Erkek Rüştiyesi)

In 1931 he started writing at Yeni Gün magazine. His notes were published in a column named Corners and parishes of Istanbul. (Note: İstanbul'un Köşe Bucağı) After that, he wrote later telegraph columns in the Akşam, İkdam, Cumhuriyet, Son Saat and Açıksöz magazines.

== Works ==
=== Novels ===
- Çingeneler – 1939
- Aygır Fatma – 1944
- Bekri Mustafa – 1944

=== Plays ===
- Üfürükçü – 1925
- İstanbul Revüsü – 1925
- Mezarlık Kızı – 1927

== Books about him ==
- Mustafa Apaydın, Osman Cemal Kaygılı'nın Hikâyeciliği, Boğaziçi Üniversitesi Yayınevi, 2006. ISBN 9756193093
