= Murat Sökmenoğlu =

Turkish politician

Mustafa Murat Sökmenoğlu (31 August 1945 – 20 June 2014) was a Turkish politician who was a parliamentary deputy from 1983 to 1989 and from 1999 to 2002.

== Background ==
Born in Istanbul, Sökmenoğlu was the son of Tayfur Sökmen.

== Career ==
Sökmenoğlu was elected to the Grand National Assembly of Turkey in 1983 for the Nationalist Democracy Party (MDP), representing Hatay Province. He joined the True Path Party after the MDP dissolved itself in 1986. He resigned on 27 December 1989 to protest the presidential election of Turgut Özal.

Sökmenoğlu later became Deputy Secretary-General of the Nationalist Movement Party (MHP). In 1999 Sökmenoğlu was elected to parliament again, representing Istanbul for the MHP, until the MHP failed to cross the electoral threshold in 2002. He was a Deputy Speaker of Parliament in this period.
