= Memduh Şevket Esendal =

Memduh Şevket Esendal (born March 29, 1883, in Çorlu; died May 16, 1952, in Ankara) was a Turkish writer, diplomat and politician. As the author of three novels and numerous short stories and narratives, he is one of the most important authors in Turkish literature in the first half of the 20th century. During his lifetime, he was best known for his political offices as Turkish ambassador to Baku, Tehran, and Kabul, and as secretary-general of the Cumhuriyet Halk Partisi (CHP).

== Life ==
Memduh Şevket Esendal was born on March 29, 1883, in Çorlu, the second of three sons of a Rumelian peasant family. His real name was Mustafa Memduh, but already during his school days he used only the name Memduh, adding Şevket, his father's first name. After the introduction of the Family Name Law in 1936, he took the surname Esendal at the suggestion of İsmet İnönü.

Memduh Şevket Esendal attended elementary and middle school in Çorlu and studied for two years at a high school in Edirne. Due to several difficulties, including financial ones, he was unable to complete his schooling. He taught himself French, Russian, and Persian.

In 1906, Memduh Şevket Esendal joined the Committee of Union and Progress. A year later, his father died and Memduh Şevket Esendal had to provide for his family. After the Young Turk Revolution in 1908, he was appointed by the Committee of Union and Progress to the inspection authority of Istanbul and traveled as an inspector throughout Rumelia and Anatolia.

In 1909, Esendal married his cousin. His two sons were born in 1912 and 1915, and his daughter was born in 1923.

During the Balkan War, the family moved from Çorlu to Istanbul and then back again. At the beginning of the First World War, the family had to emigrate to Istanbul and lost their entire fortune in the process.

In 1918, Memduh Şevket Esendal was persecuted by the Istanbul government as a member of the now dissolved Committee of Unity and Progress. However, he managed to flee to Italy during the Allied occupation of Istanbul. In 1919, he returned, went to Ankara, and sided with Mustafa Kemal Atatürk during the Turkish War of Independence. After the founding of the Grand National Assembly of Turkey, Memduh Şevket Esendal became the first envoy of the provisional government in Ankara in 1921 and served as ambassador to Baku until 1924. After his return to Turkey, he taught geography at the Istanbul high schools Kabataş (Kabataş Erkek Lisesi) and Galatasaray in Istanbul. In 1926, he was appointed to the embassy in Tehran, where he remained until 1930.

In 1930, Memduh Şevket Esendal was admitted to the Central Council of the CHP. Between 1931 and 1933, he served as a representative of Elazığ in the Grand National Assembly of Turkey.

In 1933, he was appointed ambassador to Kabul. He held this position until 1941. After his return from Kabul, Memduh Şevket Esendal was elected as a representative of Bilecik to the Turkish Grand National Assembly. Between 1942 and 1945, he was secretary-general of the CHP. In 1945, he ended his political career to devote himself entirely to his literary work.

Memduh Şevket Esendal died on May 16, 1952, and was buried in the Cebeci Municipal Cemetery in Ankara.

== Works ==
It is not known when Memduh Şevket Esendal began writing stories. As he did not want to use his name as a politician for his writing, he published his works under twelve pseudonyms. He most frequently used the initials M. Ş. and M. Ş. E., as well as the pen names Mustafa Yalınkat, Mustafa Memduh, M. Oğulcuk, and İstemenoğlu.

His first known literary texts, two prose poems, were published in 1902 under the pseudonym M. Memduh. For a long time, it was assumed that "Veysel Çavuş" (Sergeant Veysel) was his first published story. It appeared in 1908 under his name Memduh Şevket in the newspaper "Tanin," published by the Committee for Unity and Progress.

In 1925, Memduh Şevket Esendal was one of the co-editors of the political weekly newspaper "Meslek," in which many of his first stories were also published. Within 38 weeks, 35 stories were printed in this illustrated weekly under the initials M. Ş. His first novel, Miras (Inheritance), was published in 1926.

In 1934, his novel *Ayaşlı ile Kiracıları* (Mr. A.'s Tenants) was also published under the pseudonym M. Ş. This novel placed fifth in the 1942 novel competition organized by the CHP.

In 1948 and 1949, 29 of his short stories were published in the newspaper *Ulus*. His stories were also published in numerous other magazines, such as "Halk," "Ülkü," "Sanat ve Edebiyat," and "Seçilmiş Hikâyeler."

Due to his frequent use of pseudonyms, Memduh Şevket Esendal only became known as a writer later in life.

In his stories, Memduh Şevket Esendal incorporated his own experiences, impressions, and observations, recounting events from daily life and exploring the fate of ordinary people in villages and towns. His stories are written in the narrative style of Anton Chekhov, using simple, flowing language. Nevertheless, his texts are often profound and ambiguous, highlighting the beautiful aspects of life and spreading hope.

Although he is one of the most important storytellers in Turkish literature, there is still no complete overview of his literary output. Furthermore, Esendal published his stories not only in relevant literary journals but also in newspapers, sometimes unsigned. To date, approximately 200 stories have been attributed to Memduh Şevket Esendal.

Memduh Şevket Esendal is among the authors whose books have been recommended by the Turkish Ministry of National Education (Milli Eğitim Bakanlığı) to secondary school students as part of the "100 Essential Works" list for secondary school students.
