= Gülsin Onay =

Turkish pianist (born 1954)

Gulsin Onay
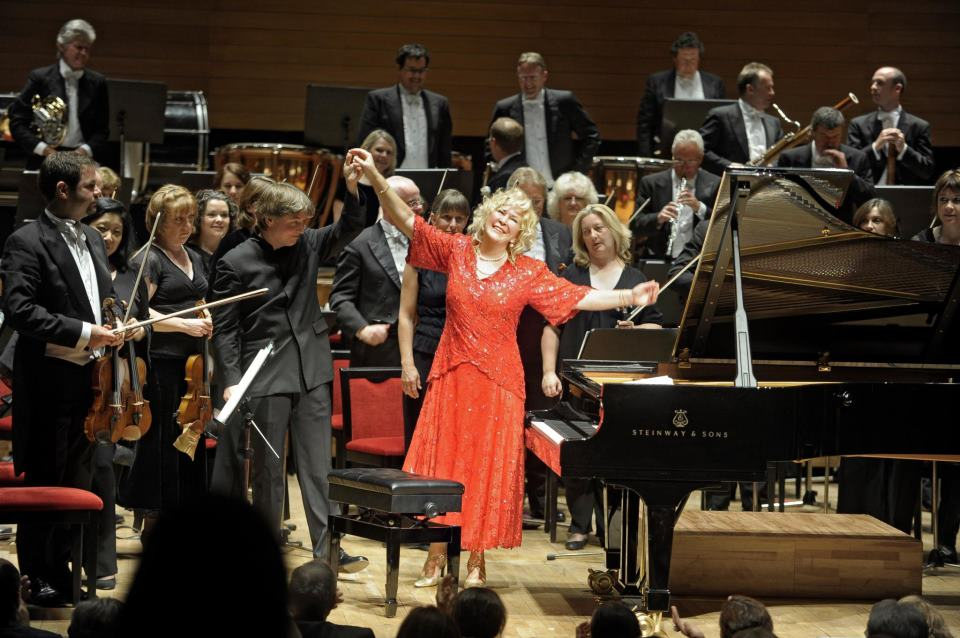
- Onay with conductor Esa Pekka Salonen

Background information
- Born: 12 September 1954 (age 71); Istanbul, Turkey
- Occupation: Pianist
- Website: www.gulsinonay.com
- Onay's voice recorded December 2018

Gülsin Onay (born 12 September 1954) is a Turkish classical pianist.

== Education ==
Born into a musical family, Gülsin Onay began to play the piano at the age of three. Her first teacher was her mother.

When she was 6 years old, Gülsin Onay gave her first concert on TRT Radio Istanbul. At the age of 10, she received a special government scholarship under the Üstün Yetenekli Çocuklar Kanunu (Law for Exceptionally Talented Children), which enabled her to study first in Ankara with Mithat Fenmen and Ahmed Adnan Saygun, and two years later at the Paris Conservatory, where her teachers were Pierre Sancan, Monique Haas, Pierre Fiquet and Nadia Boulanger. At the age of 16 she graduated with the Premier Prix de Piano. She continued her studies with Bernhard Ebert at the Musikhochschule Hannover.

== Career ==
At the outset of her career Onay took prizes in leading competitions, including the Marguerite Long–Jacques Thibaud Competition and the Ferruccio Busoni International Piano Competition. Onay's international career has spanned 80 countries across all continents, from Venezuela to Japan. She has played with orchestras including Dresden Staatskapelle, English Chamber Orchestra, Japan Philharmonic, Munich Radio Symphony, Philharmonia Orchestra, Royal Philharmonic, St Petersburg Philharmonic, Tokyo Symphony, Warsaw Philharmonic and Vienna Symphony Orchestras, under such conductors as Vladimir Ashkenazy, Erich Bergel, Michael Boder, Andrey Boreyko, Jörg Faerber, Edward Gardner, Neeme Järvi, Emmanuel Krivine, Ingo Metzmacher, Esa-Pekka Salonen, José Serebrier, Vassily Sinaisky, Stanislaw Wislocki and Lothar Zagrosek. Onay's festival appearances include Berlin, Warsaw, Granada, Mozartfest Würzburg, Newport, Schleswig-Holstein and Istanbul.

An exceptional Chopin interpreter, Onay was in 2007 honoured with the award of a State Medal by the Polish nation. She is also acknowledged worldwide as the finest interpreter of the music of Ahmed Adnan Saygun, whose works feature prominently in her concerts and recordings, and whose Second Piano Concerto (which she has premiered in Turkey and abroad) was dedicated to her. Other contemporary composers who have dedicated works to her are Hubert Stuppner, Denis Dufour, Bujor Hoinic, Jean-Louis Petit, Muhiddin Dürrüoğlu and Marc-André Hamelin. She has also given premieres of concertos by Stuppner and Tabakov.

Onay holds the titles of State Artist in her native Turkey, and of soloist for the Presidential Symphony Orchestra in Ankara. She is “Artist in Residence” at Bilkent University in Ankara and holds an honorary doctorate degrees from Boğaziçi University in Istanbul, and from Hacettepe University in Ankara. The Sevda-Cenap And Music Foundation awarded its prestigious 2007 Honorary Award Gold Medal to Onay, and she was named "Pianist of the Year" in the 2011 Donizetti Classical Music Awards. In 2014 she was awarded the Honorary Medal of the 42nd Istanbul Music Festival, and the Honorary Medal of the Bodrum Music Festival in 2018.

Onay is Artistic Advisor of the Gümüşlük International Classical Music Festival.

Onay is Online Master Teacher at iClassical Academy with whom she has recorded several online Masterclasses.

== Recordings ==
Onay has recorded 20 albums. In 2007, she released live concert recordings of Tchaikovsky's 1st and Rachmaninov's 3rd Piano Concerto. In 2008, CPO issued her recording of both Saygun concertos with the Bilkent Symphony Orchestra and Howard Griffiths. The American label VAI released a live DVD of her performances of the Grieg Concerto and the Saint-Saëns 2nd Concerto, followed in early 2011 by two DVDs of live performances from the Miami International Piano Festival. In 2021 her recordings of the piano concertos by Ulvi Cemal Erkin (first commercial recording) Khachaturian, conductor José Serebrier and the Bilkent Symphony Orchestra were released by the Gramola label.

Many of Onay's concerts have been broadcast on European radio and television, and in the USA on National Public Radio.

== Honours ==
- Honorary doctorate degrees from Boğaziçi University in Istanbul, and from Hacettepe University in Ankara.
- 1987 State Artist of the Republic of Turkey.
- 2003 Appointed Goodwill Ambassador by the Turkish national committee of UNICEF.
- 2007 Gold Cross of Merit of the Polish nation, awarded by the Polish President Lech Kaczyński for her contributions to Polish culture through her outstanding performances of the music of Chopin.
- 2007 Honorary Award Medal of the Sevda-Cenap And Music Foundation.
- 2011 “Pianist of the Year” Donizetti Classical Music Awards.
- 2012 Melvin Jones Fellowship.
- 2014 Honorary Medal of the 42nd Istanbul Music Festival.
- 2018 Honorary Medal of the Bodrum Music Festival.

== Personal life ==
Onay's mother is the daughter of the Turkish mathematician and scientist Kerim Erim. Gülsin Onay is married to the Cambridge mathematics professor Tony Scholl.
