= Kerim Erim =

Turkish mathematician and physicist

- Born: January 31st, 1894; Istanbul, Ottoman Empire
- Died: December 29, 1952 (aged 58); Istanbul, Turkey

Academic background
- Education: ITU; Friedrich-Alexander-Universität Erlangen-Nürnberg (FAU)

Academic work
- Discipline: Mathematics
- Institutions: ITU; Istanbul University

Kerim Erim (1894–1952) was a Turkish mathematician and physicist.

He graduated from the Advanced Vocational School for Engineering in Istanbul (now Istanbul Technical University) in 1914 and received a PhD in Germany. He subsequently became Professor of Analysis and Dean of the Faculty of Science in the newly established Istanbul University.

Kerim Erim's granddaughter is the Turkish classical pianist and State Artist Gülsin Onay.
