= 19th government of Turkey =

Government of the Republic of Turkey (1950-1951)

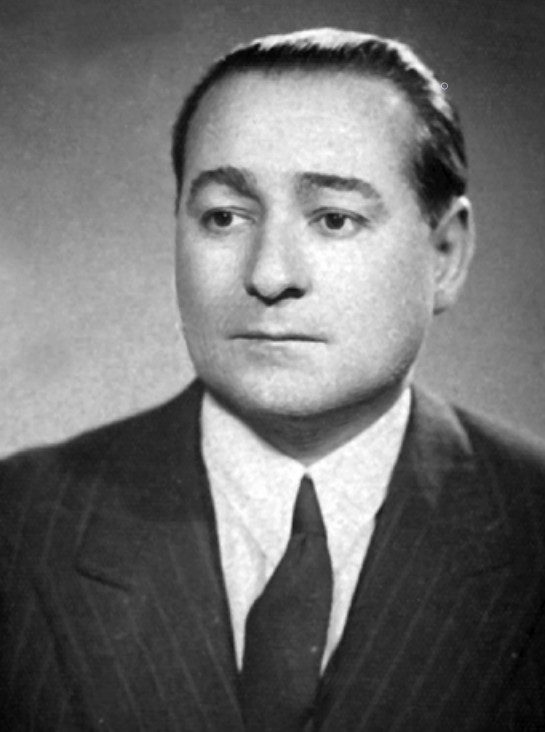
Adnan Menderes

The 19th government of Turkey (22 May 1950 – 9 March 1951) was a government in the history of Turkey. It is also called the first Menderes government.

== Background ==
Democrat Party (DP) won the general elections held on 14 May 1950. This was the first election that was won by a party other than the Republican People's Party (CHP). Adnan Menderes of the Democrat Party became the prime minister.

== The government ==
In the list below, the cabinet members who served only a part of the cabinet's lifespan are shown in the column "Notes".

Title	Name	Notes
Prime Minister	Adnan Menderes	
Deputy Prime Minister	Samet Ağaoğlu	
Minister of State	Fevzi Lütfi Karaosmanoğlu	
Ministry of Justice	Hilmi Özyörük	
Ministry of National Defense	Refik Şevket İnce	
Ministry of the Interior	Rüknettin Nasuhioğlu	
Ministry of Foreign Affairs	Fuat Köprülü	
Ministry of Finance	Halil Ayan; Hasan Polatkan	22 May 1950 – 14 December 1950; 14 December 1950 – 9 March 1951
Ministry of National Education	Avni Başman; Tevfik İleri	22 May 1950 – 3 August 1950; 11 August 1950 – 9 March 1951
Ministry of Public Works	Fahri Belen; Kemal Zeytinoğlu	22 May 1950 – 28 October 1950; 22 December 1950 – 9 March 1951
Ministry of Health and Social Security	Nihat Raşit Belger; Ekrem Hayri Üstündağ	22 May 1950 – 19 September 1950; 19 September 1950 – 9 March 1951
Ministry of Customs and Monopolies	Nuri Özsan	
Ministry of Transport	Tevfik İleri; Seyfi Kurtbek	22 May 1950 – 11 August 1950; 11 August 1950 – 9 March 1951
Ministry of Establishments	Muhlis Ete	
Ministry of Economy and Commerce	Hilmi Velibeşe	
Ministry of Agriculture	Nihat İyriboz	
Ministry of Labour	Hasan Polatkan; Hulusi Köymen	22 May 1950 – 22 December 1950; 22 December 1950 – 9 March 1951

== Aftermath ==
The government had the majority in the parliament, but Menderes resigned on 8 March 1951. According to journalist Metin Toker, Adnan Menderes asked one of his colleagues in the cabinet to resign, but the minister refused to resign. Legally, Menderes had no authority to force any minister to resign, and thus, Menderes preferred to end the entire government instead. But the president Celal Bayar appointed him to form the next government also.

Preceded by 18th government of Turkey (Şemsettin Günaltay)	19th Government of Turkey; 22 May 1950 - 9 March 1951	Succeeded by 20th government of Turkey (Adnan Menderes)
