= 9th Parliament of Turkey =

The 9th Grand National Assembly of Turkey existed from 14 May 1950 to 14 May 1954. There were 510 MPs in the parliament. The majority party was Democrat Party (DP) and the main opposition was Republican People's Party (CHP). Nation Party had only one seat.

== Main parliamentary milestones ==
Some of the important events in the history of the parliament are the following:

- 22 May 1950 - Celal Bayar was elected as the third president of Turkey.
- 2 June 1950 – Adnan Menderes of DP formed the 19th government of Turkey
- 16 June – Law 5665 :End of Turkish ezan (call for Islamic prayer). From this date Arabic ezan replaced Turkish ezan
- 9 March 1951 – Adnan Menderes formed the 20th government of Turkey
- 9 August 1951- Law 5830 :End of halkevleri Project
- 16 June 1952 – Law 5958: Restrictions of Ottoman dynasty members was partially lifted
- 24 December 1952 - The text of the constitution was revised to replace Turkish words with the Ottoman Turkish equivalents
- 27 January 1954 - Law 6234:End of Village Institutes
- 27 January 1954 - Nation Party was outlawed
- 2 May 1954 – General Elections

Preceded by 8th Parliament of Turkey	9th Parliament of Turkey; Refik Koraltan; 14 May 1950-14 May 1954	Succeeded by 10th Parliament of Turkey
