= 8th Parliament of Turkey =

The 8th Grand National Assembly of Turkey existed from 21 July 1946 to 22 May 1950. There were 499 MPs in the parliament. 66 of them were the members of newly founded Democrat Party (DP) and 8 of them were independents. The rest were the members of the Republican People's Party (CHP).

== Main parliamentary milestones ==
Some of the important events in the history of the parliament are the following:

- 5 August 1946 - İsmet İnönü was reelected as the President of Turkey for the fourth time
- 5 August 1946 – Kazım Karabekir was elected as the speaker of the parliament
- 5 August 1946– Recep Peker of CHP formed the 15th government of Turkey
- 26 December 1946– İsmet İnönü acted as a mediator between the two parties and DP which was boycotting the parliament agreed to participate in the parliament
- 9 September 1947 – Hasan Saka of CHP formed the 16th government of Turkey
- 18 June 1948 – Hasan Saka formed the 17th government of Turkey
- 19 July 1948 - Nation Party was founded
- 14 January- Şemsettin Günaltay of CHP formed the 18th government of Turkey
- 3 June 1949- Law 5421 New Income tax law
- 16 February 1950 - Law 5545 New election Law
- 14 May 1950 - General elections

Preceded by 7th Parliament of Turkey	8th Parliament of Turkey; Kazım Karabekir; Ali Fuat Cebesoy; Şükrü Saracoğlu; 21 July 1946-2 May 1950	Succeeded by 9th Parliament of Turkey
