= List of elections in 1950 =

The following elections occurred in the year 1950.

== Africa ==
- 1950 Egyptian parliamentary election
- 1950 South West African parliamentary election

== Asia ==
- 1950 Egyptian parliamentary election
- 1950 Indian presidential election
- 1950 Iranian legislative election
- 1950 Israeli municipal elections
- 1950 Japanese House of Councillors election
- 1950 Jordanian general election
- 1950 North Korean local elections in South Korea
- 1950 South Korean legislative election
- 1950 Soviet Union legislative election
- 1950 Syrian presidential election
- 1950–51 Taiwanese local elections
- 1950 Turkish general election
- 1950 Turkish presidential election

== Europe ==
- 1950 Albanian parliamentary election
- 1950 Belgian general election
- 1950 Danish Folketing election
- 1950 Danish local elections
- 1950 Faroese general election
- 1950 Finnish presidential election
- 1950 Greek parliamentary election
- 1950 Irish local elections
- 1950 Maltese general election
- 1950 Monegasque general election
- 1950 Soviet Union legislative election
- 1950 Swiss referendums
- 1950 Turkish general election
- 1950 Turkish presidential election
- 1950 Yugoslavian parliamentary election

=== Germany ===
==== West Germany ====
- 1950 Bavarian state election
- 1950 Hessian state election
- 1950 North Rhine-Westphalia state election
- 1950 Schleswig-Holstein state election
- 1950 West Berlin state election
- 1950 Württemberg-Baden state election
- 1950 Kulmbach by-election

==== East Germany ====
- 1950 East German general election
- 1950 East German state elections

=== United Kingdom ===
- 1950 United Kingdom general election
  - England: 1950 United Kingdom general election in England
  - Scotland: 1950 United Kingdom general election in Scotland
  - Wales: 1950 United Kingdom general election in Wales
  - Northern Ireland: 1950 United Kingdom general election in Northern Ireland
  - List of MPs elected in the 1950 United Kingdom general election
- 1950 Abertillery by-election
- 1950 Belfast West by-election
- 1950 Birmingham Handsworth by-election
- 1950 Brighouse and Spenborough by-election
- 1950 Bristol South East by-election
- 1950 Glasgow Scotstoun by-election
- 1950 Leicester North East by-election
- 1950 Oxford by-election
- 1950 Sheffield Neepsend by-election
- 1950 West Dunbartonshire by-election

== North America ==
=== Canada ===
- 1950 Brampton municipal election
- 1950 Edmonton municipal election
- 1950 Ottawa municipal election
- 1950 Sudbury municipal election
- December 1950 Toronto municipal election
- January 1950 Toronto municipal election

=== Caribbean ===
- 1950 Cuban parliamentary election
- 1950 Haitian general election

=== Middle America ===
- 1950 Guatemalan parliamentary election
- 1950 Guatemalan presidential election
- 1950 Nicaraguan general election
- 1950 Salvadoran general election

=== United States ===
- 1950 New York state election
- 1950 United States elections

==== United States lieutenant gubernatorial ====
- 1950 California lieutenant gubernatorial election
- 1950 Connecticut lieutenant gubernatorial election
- 1950 Georgia lieutenant gubernatorial election
- 1950 Minnesota lieutenant gubernatorial election
- 1950 Nebraska lieutenant gubernatorial election
- 1950 Texas lieutenant gubernatorial election
- 1950 Wisconsin lieutenant gubernatorial election

==== United States gubernatorial ====
- 1950 Alabama gubernatorial election
- 1950 Arizona gubernatorial election
- 1950 Arkansas gubernatorial election
- 1950 California gubernatorial election
- 1950 Colorado gubernatorial election
- 1950 Connecticut gubernatorial election
- 1950 Georgia gubernatorial election
- 1950 Idaho gubernatorial election
- 1950 Iowa gubernatorial election
- 1950 Kansas gubernatorial election
- 1950 Maine gubernatorial election
- 1950 Maryland gubernatorial election
- 1950 Massachusetts gubernatorial election
- 1950 Michigan gubernatorial election
- 1950 Minnesota gubernatorial election
- 1950 Nebraska gubernatorial election
- 1950 Nevada gubernatorial election
- 1950 New Hampshire gubernatorial election
- 1950 New Mexico gubernatorial election
- 1950 New York gubernatorial election
- 1950 North Dakota gubernatorial election
- 1950 Ohio gubernatorial election
- 1950 Oklahoma gubernatorial election
- 1950 Oregon gubernatorial election
- 1950 Pennsylvania gubernatorial election
- 1950 Rhode Island gubernatorial election
- 1950 South Carolina gubernatorial election
- 1950 South Dakota gubernatorial election
- 1950 Tennessee gubernatorial election
- 1950 Texas gubernatorial election
- 1950 United States gubernatorial elections
- 1950 Vermont gubernatorial election
- 1950 Wisconsin gubernatorial election
- 1950 Wyoming gubernatorial election

==== United States House of Representatives ====
- 1950 United States House of Representatives elections

==== United States Senate ====
- 1950 United States Senate elections
- 1950 United States Senate election in Alabama
- 1950 United States Senate election in Arizona
- 1950 United States Senate election in California
- 1950 United States Senate election in Colorado
- 1950 United States Senate election in Connecticut
- 1950 United States Senate special election in Connecticut
- 1950 United States Senate election in Florida
- 1950 United States Senate election in Georgia
- 1950 United States Senate election in Idaho
- 1950 United States Senate special election in Idaho
- 1950 United States Senate election in Illinois
- 1950 United States Senate election in Indiana
- 1950 United States Senate election in Iowa
- 1950 United States Senate election in Kansas
- 1950 United States Senate elections in Kentucky
- 1950 United States Senate election in Louisiana
- 1950 United States Senate election in Maryland
- 1950 United States Senate election in Missouri
- 1950 United States Senate election in Nevada
- 1950 United States Senate election in New Hampshire
- 1950 United States Senate election in New York
- 1950 United States Senate election in North Carolina
- 1950 United States Senate special election in North Carolina
- 1950 United States Senate election in North Dakota
- 1950 United States Senate election in Ohio
- 1950 United States Senate election in Oklahoma
- 1950 United States Senate election in Pennsylvania
- 1950 United States Senate election in South Carolina
- 1950 United States Senate election in South Dakota
- 1950 United States Senate election in Vermont
- 1950 United States Senate election in Washington
- 1950 United States Senate election in Wisconsin

==== United States mayoral elections ====
- 1950 New Orleans mayoral election
- 1950 New York City mayoral special election

== Oceania ==
=== Australia ===
- 1950 Armidale state by-election
- 1950 Concord state by-election
- 1950 New South Wales state election
- 1950 Queensland state election
- 1950 South Australian state election
- 1950 Tasmanian state election
- 1950 Western Australian prohibition referendum
- 1950 Western Australian state election
- 1950 Wollondilly state by-election
- 1950 Wollongong-Kembla state by-election

== South America ==
- 1950 Brazilian general election
- 1950 Ecuadorian parliamentary election
- 1950 Peruvian general election
- 1950 Uruguayan general election

== See also ==
- Category:1950 elections
