= Kemal Satır =

Turkish politician

Deputy Prime Minister
- In office April 15, 1973 – January 25, 1974 Serving with Nizamettin Erkmen
- Prime Minister: Mehmet Naim Talu
- Preceded by: Ali Mesut Erez
- Succeeded by: Necmettin Erbakan

Deputy Prime Minister
- In office December 25, 1963 – February 20, 1965
- Prime Minister: İsmet İnönü
- Preceded by: Turhan Feyzioğlu; Ekrem Alican; Hasan Dinçer
- Succeeded by: Süleyman Demirel

7th Minister of Transportation
- In office January 16, 1949 – May 22, 1950
- Prime Minister: Şemsettin Günaltay
- Preceded by: Kasım Gülek
- Succeeded by: Ahmet Tevfik İleri

Personal details
- Born: 21 April 1911 Adana, Adana Vilayet, Ottoman Empire
- Died: 23 May 1991 Istanbul, Turkey
- Party: Republican People's Party (CHP); Republican Party; Republican Reliance Party
- Education: Medicine
- Alma mater: Istanbul University
- Occupation: Politician

Kemal Satır (21 April 1911 – 23 May 1991) was a Turkish physician and politician.

== Early years ==
He was born in Adana. After finishing the School of Medicine in Istanbul University, he began working as a radiology expert in 1937. He also became a member of Republican People's Party (CHP). Between 1943 and 1950, he was the MP from Adana Province, and between 1949-1950, he served as the Minister of Transportation in the 18th government of Turkey (Şemsettin Günaltay's cabinet).

== After 1950 ==
After the defeat of CHP in 1950 elections, in which he lost his seat in the parliament, he returned to medical practice. In 1957, he was elected as the MP from Elazığ Province, and continued as Elazığ MP up to 1969, when he changed his electoral province to Adana again. Between 1963 and 1965, he became the deputy prime minister in the cabinet of İsmet İnönü.

== Strife in the party ==
Kemal Satır also served in the party administration. From 1962 to 1966, he became the secretary general of CHP. He was known as a moderate politician, and tried to keep the balance during the intra party struggle between Bülent Ecevit and Turhan Feyzioğlu. However, after Turhan Feyzioğlu and his group left the party, he became the main opponent of Bülent Ecevit. After Bülent Ecevit became the chairman of the party, Kemal Satır and a group of MPs left the party.

== Republican Party ==
He formed a party named Republican Party. The party was founded on 4 September 1972. He was elected as the chairman of the party. The new established party lived short. On 28 February 1973, it merged to Nationalist Reliance Party (aka Reliance Party) of Turhan Feyzioğlu. After merging, the party was renamed Republican Reliance Party. Kemal Satır became the vice president. During this period, he served as the deputy prime minister in Naim Talu's cabinet once more.

== Last years ==
After the election defeat in 1973, he resigned from the politics. He took part in the board of directors of two banks. He died in 1991.

== See also ==
- 18th government of Turkey
- 28th government of Turkey
- 36th government of Turkey

Preceded by Kasım Gülek	Minister of Transportation; 10 January 1949 – 22 May 1950	Succeeded by Tevfik İleri
Preceded by Turhan Feyzioğlu; Hasan Dincer; Ekrem Alican	Deputy Prime Minister; 25 December 1963-20 February 1965	Succeeded by Süleyman Demirel
Preceded by Ali Mesut Erez	Deputy Prime Minister with Nizamettin Erkmen; 15 April 1973-25 January 1974	Succeeded by Necmettin Erbakan
Preceded by İsmail Rüştü Aksal	Secretary general of the Republican People's Party; 1962-1966	Succeeded by Bülent Ecevit
