= 17th government of Turkey =

Government of the Republic of Turkey (1948-1949)

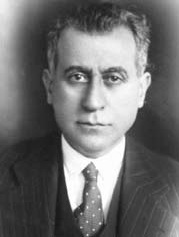
Hasan Saka

The 17th government of Turkey (10 June 1948 – 16 January 1949) was a short-term government in the history of Turkey. It is also known as the second Saka government.

== Background ==
Hasan Saka of the Republican People's Party (CHP), who was the previous prime minister, resigned on 8 June 1948. However, he was again assigned to form a government. His cabinet was not very different from the previous cabinet. The major addition was Nihat Erim, who was seen as the potential new leader of the party.

The government was given a vote of confidence from the Parliament on 18 June 1948.

== The government ==
The members of the 17th government were as follows:

In the list below, the cabinet members who served only a part of the cabinet's lifespan are shown in the column "Notes".

Title	Name	Notes
Prime Minister	Hasan Saka	
Deputy Prime Minister	Faik Ahmet Barutçu	
Minister of State	Abdülhalik Renda	
Ministry of Justice	Fuat Sirmen; Ali Rıza Erten	10 June 1948 – 13 January 1949; 13 January 1949 – 16 January 1949
Ministry of National Defense and Navy	Hüsnü Çakır	
Ministry of the Interior	Münir Hüsrev Göle	
Ministry of Foreign Affairs	Necmettin Sadak	
Ministry of Finance	Şevket Adalan	
Ministry of National Education	Tahsin Banguoğlu	
Ministry of Public Works	Nihat Erim	
Ministry of Health and Social Security	Kemali Bayazıt	
Ministry of Customs and Monopolies	Emin Erişirgil	
Ministry of Economy	Cavit Ekin	
Ministry of Agriculture	Cavit Oral	
Ministry of Transport	Kasım Gülek	
Ministry of Commerce	Cemil Sait Barlas	
Ministry of Labour	Bekir Balta	

== Aftermath ==
The Republican People's Party (CHP) was losing ground to the Democrat Party (DP), and CHP was looking for a more charismatic prime minister. After preparing a new election (which would prove to be disadvantageous to CHP in 1950), Saka resigned on 14 January 1949.

Preceded by 16th government of Turkey (Hasan Saka)	17th Government of Turkey (10 June 1948 – 16 January 1949	Succeeded by 18th government of Turkey (Şemsettin Günaltay)
