= Göle (Turkish surname) =

Göle is a Turkish surname. Notable people with the surname are as follows:

- Münir Göle (born 1961), Turkish photographer
- Münir Hüsrev Göle (1890–1955), Turkish politician
- Nilüfer Göle (born 1953), Turkish sociologist and academic
- Turgut Göle (1913–2002), Turkish lawyer and politician
