= 18th government of Turkey =

Government of the Republic of Turkey (1949-1950)

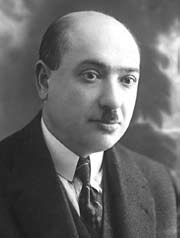
Şemsettin Günaltay

The 18th government of Turkey (16 January 1949 – 22 May 1950) is also referred to as the Günaltay government.

== Background ==
Hasan Saka of the Republican People's Party (CHP), who was the previous prime minister, resigned on 14 September 1949. President İsmet İnönü, upon the suggestion of Hilmi Uran, the secretary general of his party, assigned Şemsettin Günaltay as the new prime minister. Günaltay was a scholar of religion, philosophy and history. A scholar of religion as the prime minister of a party which was known to be the champion of secularism was quite unexpected.

== The government ==
In the list below, the cabinet members who served only a part of the cabinet's lifespan are shown in the column "Notes".

Title	Name	Notes
Prime Minister	Şemsettin Günaltay	
Deputy Prime Minister	Nihat Erim	
Minister of State	Nurullah Esat Sümer; Cemil Sait Barlas	16 January 1949 – 7 June 1949; 7 June 1949 – 22 May 1950
Ministry of Justice	Fuat Sirmen	
Ministry of National Defense and Navy	Hüsnü Çakır	
Ministry of the Interior	Mehmet Emin Erişirgil	
Ministry of Foreign Affairs	Necmettin Sadak	
Ministry of Finance	İsmail Rüştü Aksal	
Ministry of National Education	Tahsin Banguoğlu	
Ministry of Public Works	Şevket Adalan	
Ministry of Health and Social Security	Kemali Bayazıt	
Ministry of Customs and Monopolies	Şerafettin Bürge	
Ministry of Economy and Commerce	Cemil Sait Barlas; Vedat Dicleli	16 January 1949 – 7 June 1949; 7 June 1949 – 22 May 1950
Ministry of Agriculture	Cavit Oral	
Ministry of Transport	Kemal Satır	
Ministry of Establishments	Münir Birsel	7 June 1949 – 22 May 1950
Ministry of Labour	Şemsettin Sirer	

== Aftermath ==
Günaltay resigned after his party lost the general elections held on 14 May 1950. The next government was founded by Adnan Menderes of the Democrat Party.

Preceded by 17th government of Turkey (Hasan Saka)	18th Government of Turkey; 16 January 1949 – 22 May 1950	Succeeded by 19th government of Turkey (Adnan Menderes)
