= Cemil Sait Barlas =

Turkish politician

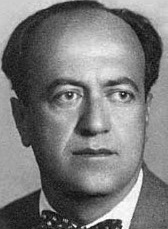

Minister of Commerce
- In office 10 June 1948 – 7 June 1949
- Prime Minister: Hasan Saka; Şemsettin Günaltay
- Preceded by: Nedim Gündüzalp
- Succeeded by: Vedat Dicleli

Minister of State
- In office 7 June 1949 – 22 May 1950
- Prime Minister: Şemsettin Günaltay
- Preceded by: Nurullah Esat Sümer
- Succeeded by: Fevzi Lütfi Karosmanoğlu

Personal details
- Born: 1905 Constantinople, Ottoman Empire
- Died: 10 October 1964 (aged 58–59) Hendek, Turkey
- Cause of death: Road accident
- Education: Istanbul High School; Istanbul University; Heidelberg University
- Occupation: Judge, politician, journalist
- Profession: Law

Cemil Sait Barlas (1905 – 10 October 1964) was a Turkish judge, politician and journalist. He served as government minister.

== Life ==
Cemil Sait was born in Constantinople, Ottoman Empire in 1905. His father Mehmet Sait was a judge. After graduating from Istanbul University, Faculty of Law in 1929, he went to Germany, where he obtained a doctoral degree from Heidelberg University.

After returning to Turkey, and served as a judge, a courthouse inspector and legal advisor at Etibank, a state-owned bank.

He married Emine Şahingiray, who gave birth to two sons and a daughter. One of his sons, Mehmet Barlas, is a journalist.

Barlas died in Hendek, Sakarya Province on 10 October 1964 due to a traffic accident.

== Career ==
Cemil Sait Barlas joined the Republican People's Party (CHP) in 1943. In the 17th government of Turkey between 10 June 1948 and 16 January 1949, served as the Minister of Commerce. He kept his seat in the 18th government of Turkey until 7 June 1949 when he was appointed as the Minister of State. The CHP lost the majority in the parliament in the 1950 general election, and he lost his post on 22 May 1950.

After 1950, Barlas began his career in journalism and published two newspapers. The first Pazar Postası (1951–1953) was a weekly and the second Son Havadis was a daily (1953–1958). Although both papers were political, there was also a page of literature, and the papers contributed to the contemporary literary discussions.

In the 1957 general election, he was a CHP candidate from Gaziantep Province. According to the official announcements, he won the election, But later the results were altered, and Barlas lost the election due to objections by other political parties.

In 1960, he sold his newspaper, and retired from journalism. He was appointed director general of the insurance company of national reassurance. He authored a book "Sosyalistlik Yolları ve Türkiye Gerçeği" ("The Ways of Socialism and the Reality in Turkey") in 1962.
