= Fevzi Lütfi Karaosmanoğlu =

Turkish politician (1900–1978)

Minister of Interior
- In office 2 December 1951 – 2 April 1952
- President: Celal Bayar
- Prime Minister: Adnan Menderes

Minister of State
- In office 1950 – 9 March 1951
- President: Celal Bayar
- Prime Minister: Adnan Menderes

Personal details
- Born: 1900 Manisa, Aidin vilayet, Ottoman Empire
- Died: 22 October 1978 (aged 77–78) Istanbul, Turkey
- Party: Progressive Republican Party; Democrat Party; Liberty Party; Republican People's Party; Justice Party
- Education: Halkalı Higher Agriculture School

Fevzi Lütfi Karaosmanoğlu (1900–1978) was a Turkish landowner, politician, writer and journalist. He was a member of the Parliament for three times in the 1950s and in the early 1960s. He briefly served as the minister of state and minister of interior in the cabinets formed by the Prime Minister Adnan Menderes. Throughout his political career Karaosmanoğlu was part of various political parties.

== Early life and education ==
He was born in Manisa in 1900. His family was an influential local dynasty in the region, and the members of the family were ayans, landowners and leaders based in Salihli.

He obtained a degree in agriculture from Halkalı Higher Agriculture School in Istanbul in 1922. During his studies he published articles in Dergâh and Yeni Mecmua magazines.

== Career and activities ==
Following his graduation he continued to write for various publications, including Resimli Gazete and Son Telgraf which was started by him and Sadri Ethem, Hüseyin Avni, Suphi Nuri İleri in 1924. In Son Telgraf he had a column entitled "Değil mi?" (Turkish: Isn't it?). He supported the Progressive Republican Party which was formed in 1924. Due to his opposition to the Republican People's Party (CHP) and the regime he was tried at the Independence Tribunal of Elazığ for three months and was found not guilty on 13 September 1925. Following this incident he briefly wrote for the Güneş newspaper and ended his journalistic activity.

He returned to his hometown in 1927 and was involved in agriculture in his farm in Salihli, Manisa, until the 1940s. Karaosmanoğlu continued to criticize the single-party government through his articles in Vatan during the World War II period. He became a member of the Democrat Party (DP) and ran for a seat from Manisa in the 1946 general election, but did not win the election. He was elected as a member of the DP's executive board in the first congress held in January 1947.

Karaosmanoğlu became a deputy from Manisa for the DP in the 1950 general election. He was made a minister of state to the cabinet led by Adnan Menderes in 1950. He was in charge of the implementation of the Marshall aid. His tenure ended on 9 March 1951. Karaosmanoğlu was appointed minister of interior on 2 December 1951, but he resigned from office on 2 April 1952. He won his seat in the general election held on 2 May 1954. He was dismissed from the DP in October 1955 as a result the conflicts between him and Prime Minister Adnan Menderes. Karaosmanoğlu had been criticizing both Menderes and President Celâl Bayar due their "dictatorial tendencies". Nearly twenty-eight DP members were also removed from the party on the same date.

Karaosmanoğlu and other former DP politicians established the Liberty Party, and he was elected as its chairman on 22 December 1955. He was one of the signatories of a declaration issued on 4 September 1957 which demanded the detailed inclusion of the fundamental rights and freedoms in the constitution, the establishment of a Constitutional Court and the adoption of the bicameral system. The other signatories of the statement included İsmet İnönü, Turgut Göle, Fuat Arna, Kasım Gülek, Enver Güreli, Ahmet Bilgin, İbrahim Öktem and Nurettin Ardıçoğlu.

Karaosmanoğlu was a deputy candidate for the party from Istanbul in the 1957 general election, but he did not win a seat. Next year the Liberty Party members, including Karaosmanoğlu, joined the CHP. He was elected to the CHP's council in the 14th congress on 12 January 1959 with the highest number of votes.

Following the military coup on 27 May 1960 a Constituent Assembly was formed. Karaosmanoğlu was a representative of the CHP at the Assembly in 1961. He was elected as a deputy from Manisa for the CHP in the 1961 general election. He resigned from both the CHP and the Parliament on 4 March 1962 as a result of his conflicts with the CHP leadership. He later supported the Justice Party.

=== Views ===
Karaosmanoğlu argued that a democratic regime should be established instead of the bureaucratic mentality and government. In response to the demands of religious groups about the establishment of canonical legislation "to mingle religious and worldly affairs" in Turkey he reported in May 1951 that not the faith of Turkish people, but their Turkish character should be supported. He was serving as minister of interior when he made this statement.

== Death ==
Karaosmanoğlu died in Istanbul on 22 October 1978.
