= Gülek (disambiguation) =

Gülek is a town in Mersin Province, Turkey.

Gülek may also refer to:

- Gülek Pass or Cilician Gates

== People with the surname ==
- Kasım Gülek (1905–1996), Turkish statesman
- Tayyibe Gülek (born 1968), Turkish economist and politician
