= December 13 =

Events on calendar date 13 December

December 13 this year in various calendars
- Sunday, 13 December 2026
Akan	Fokwasi
Armenian	26 Kʿaloch 1476
Aztec	Tozoztontli 12, 13 Cōātl
Babylonian	3 Kislimu, 2337 SE
Balinese pawukon	Luang, Pepet, Pasah, Jaya, Wage, Tungleh, Redite of Wariga, Guru, Nohan, Raksasa
Bengali	28 Ogrohayon, BS 1433
Chinese	Yin Metal Rooster・Room Mansion; Fire Horse Year, Month 11, Day 5 (Daxue, 9 days until Dongzhi)
Common Era	13 December 2026 CE
Coptic	4 Koiak, AM 1743
Egyptian	1 Pachon, 2775 NE
Ethiopian	4 Tākḫśāś, 2019 Amätä Məhrät
French Republican	Décade III, Duodi de Frimaire de l'Année 235 de la République
Gregorian	13 December, AD 2026
Hebrew	3 Tevet, AM 5787
Hindu	Śravaṇa・Dhruva; Solar: 27 Mārgaśīrṣa, 1948 SE; Lunisolar: Caturthī, Śukla pakṣa of Mārgaśīrṣa, 2083 VE; Rāudra・5127 KY・1,872,922
Icelandic	Sunnudagur, 21 Ýlir 2026
Islamic	3 Rajab, AH 1448 (using tabular method)
ISO week date	2026-W50-7
Japanese	5 Shimotsuki, Reiwa 8 (Taisetsu, 9 days until Tōji)
Julian	30 November, AD 2026 (AM 7535)
Julian day	2461388
Korean	5 Jwidal, 4359 DE
Maya	13.0.14.3.5; 18 Mac, 13 Chicchan
Roman	Pridie Kalendas Decembres, MMDCCLXXIX AUC
Solar Hijri	22 Azar, SH 1405
Tibetan	4 mgo, me pho rta 2153 or 1772 or 1000

<<	December					>>
Su	Mo	Tu	We	Th	Fr	Sa
		1	2	3	4	5
6	7	8	9	10	11	12
13	14	15	16	17	18	19
20	21	22	23	24	25	26
27	28	29	30	31
2026

December 13 in recent years
2025 (Saturday)
2024 (Friday)
2023 (Wednesday)
2022 (Tuesday)
2021 (Monday)
2020 (Sunday)
2019 (Friday)
2018 (Thursday)
2017 (Wednesday)
2016 (Tuesday)

December 13 is the 347th day of the year (348th in leap years) in the Gregorian calendar; 18 days remain until the end of the year.

== Events ==
=== Pre-1600 ===
- 1076 – The city of Salerno surrenders to Robert Guiscard. Duke Gisulf continues his resistance in the citadel until May of the following year.
- 1294 – Saint Celestine V resigns the papacy after only five months to return to his previous life as an ascetic hermit.
- 1545 – The Council of Trent begins as the embodiment of the Counter-Reformation.
- 1577 – Sir Francis Drake sets sail from Plymouth, England, on his round-the-world voyage.

=== 1601–1900 ===
- 1623 – The Plymouth Colony establishes the system of trial by 12-men jury in the American colonies.
- 1636 – The Massachusetts Bay Colony organizes three militia regiments to defend the colony against the Pequot Indians, a date now considered the founding of the National Guard of the United States.
- 1642 – Abel Tasman is the first recorded European to sight New Zealand.
- 1643 – English Civil War: The Battle of Alton takes place in Hampshire.
- 1758 – The English transport ship Duke William sinks in the North Atlantic, killing over 360 people.
- 1769 – Dartmouth College is founded by the Reverend Eleazar Wheelock, with a royal charter from King George III, on land donated by Royal governor John Wentworth.
- 1818 – Cyril VI of Constantinople resigns from his position as Ecumenical Patriarch under pressure from the Ottoman Empire.
- 1862 – American Civil War: At the Battle of Fredericksburg, Confederate General Robert E. Lee repulses attacks by Union Major General Ambrose Burnside on Marye's Heights, inflicting heavy casualties.
- 1864 – American Civil War: Sherman's March to the Sea: The Second Battle of Fort McAllister ends with the fort being seized by Union forces under General William B. Hazen, threatening the city of Savannah with investment.

=== 1901–present ===
- 1901 – 2^{-31} seconds before the epoch: The date at which all fixed-width 32-bit date processors will have overflown to and display; the year 2038 problem.
- 1937 – Second Sino-Japanese War: Battle of Nanking: The city of Nanjing, defended by the National Revolutionary Army under the command of General Tang Shengzhi, falls to the Japanese. This is followed by the Nanking Massacre, in which Japanese troops rape and slaughter hundreds of thousands of civilians.
- 1938 – The Holocaust: The Neuengamme concentration camp opens in the Bergedorf district of Hamburg, Germany.
- 1939 – The Battle of the River Plate is fought off the coast of Uruguay; the first naval battle of World War II. The Kriegsmarine's Deutschland-class cruiser (pocket battleship) Admiral Graf Spee engages with three Royal Navy cruisers: HMS Ajax, HMNZS Achilles and HMS Exeter.
- 1943 – World War II: The Massacre of Kalavryta by German occupying forces in Greece.
- 1949 – The Knesset votes to move the capital of Israel from Tel Aviv to Jerusalem.
- 1957 – The M_{w} 6.5 Farsinaj earthquake strikes Iran with a maximum Mercalli intensity of VII, causing at least 1,119 deaths and damaging over 5,000 homes.
- 1959 – Archbishop Makarios III becomes the first President of Cyprus.
- 1960 – While Emperor Haile Selassie of Ethiopia visits Brazil, his Imperial Bodyguard seizes the capital and proclaims him deposed and his son, Crown Prince Asfa Wossen, Emperor.
- 1962 – NASA launches Relay 1, the first active repeater communications satellite in orbit.
- 1967 – Constantine II of Greece attempts an unsuccessful counter-coup against the Regime of the Colonels.
- 1968 – Brazilian President Artur da Costa e Silva issues AI-5 (Institutional Act No. 5), enabling government by decree and suspending habeas corpus.
- 1972 – Apollo program: Eugene Cernan and Harrison Schmitt begin the third and final extra-vehicular activity (EVA) or "Moonwalk" of Apollo 17. To date they are the last humans to set foot on the Moon.
- 1974 – Malta becomes a republic within the Commonwealth of Nations.
- 1974 – In the Vietnam War, the North Vietnamese forces launch their 1975 Spring Offensive (to 30 April 1975), which results in the final capitulation of South Vietnam.
- 1977 – Air Indiana Flight 216 crashes near Evansville Regional Airport, killing 29, including the University of Evansville basketball team, support staff, and boosters of the team.
- 1981 – General Wojciech Jaruzelski declares martial law in Poland, largely due to the actions by Solidarity.
- 1982 – The 6.0 M_{s} North Yemen earthquake shakes southwestern Yemen with a maximum Mercalli intensity of VIII (Severe), killing 2,800, and injuring 1,500.
- 1988 – PLO Chairman Yasser Arafat gives a speech at a UN General Assembly meeting in Geneva, Switzerland, after United States authorities refused to grant him a visa to visit UN headquarters in New York.
- 1989 – The Troubles: Attack on Derryard checkpoint: The Provisional Irish Republican Army launches an attack on a British Army temporary vehicle checkpoint near Rosslea, Northern Ireland. Two British soldiers are killed and two others are wounded.
- 1994 – Flagship Airlines Flight 3379 crashes in Morrisville, North Carolina, near Raleigh–Durham International Airport, killing 15.
- 1995 – Banat Air Flight 166 crashes in Sommacampagna near Verona Villafranca Airport in Verona, Italy, killing 49.
- 2001 – Indian Parliament attack: Sansad Bhavan, the building housing the Indian Parliament, is attacked by five Jaish-e-Mohammed terrorists. Twelve people are killed, including the terrorists.
- 2002 – European Union enlargement: The EU announces that Cyprus, the Czech Republic, Estonia, Hungary, Latvia, Lithuania, Malta, Poland, Slovakia, and Slovenia will become members on May 1, 2004.
- 2003 – Iraq War: Operation Red Dawn: Former Iraqi President Saddam Hussein is captured near his home town of Tikrit.
- 2007 – The Treaty of Lisbon is signed by the EU member states to amend both the Treaty of Rome and the Maastricht Treaty which together form the constitutional basis of the EU. The Treaty of Lisbon is effective from 1 December 2009.

== Births ==
=== Pre-1600 ===
- 1272 – King Frederick III of Sicily (died 1337)
- 1363 – Jean Gerson, chancellor of the University of Paris (died 1429)
- 1476 – Lucy Brocadelli, Dominican tertiary and stigmatic (died 1544)
- 1484 – Paul Speratus, German Lutheran (died 1551)
- 1491 – Martín de Azpilcueta, Spanish theologian and economist (died 1586)
- 1499 – Justus Menius, German Lutheran pastor (died 1558)
- 1521 – Pope Sixtus V (died 1590)
- 1533 – Eric XIV of Sweden (died 1577)
- 1553 – Henry IV of France (died 1610)
- 1560 – Maximilien de Béthune, Duke of Sully, 2nd Prime Minister of France (died 1641)
- 1585 – William Drummond of Hawthornden, Scottish poet (died 1649)

=== 1601–1900 ===
- 1640 – Robert Plot, English chemist and academic (died 1696)
- 1662 – Francesco Bianchini, Italian astronomer and philosopher (died 1729)
- 1678 – Yongzheng Emperor of China (died 1735)
- 1720 – Carlo Gozzi, Italian playwright (died 1804)
- 1724 – Franz Aepinus, German astronomer and philosopher (died 1802)
- 1769 – James Scarlett Abinger, English judge (died 1844)
- 1780 – Johann Wolfgang Döbereiner, German chemist, invented the Döbereiner's lamp (died 1849)
- 1784 – Archduke Louis of Austria (died 1864)
- 1797 – Heinrich Heine, German journalist, poet, and critic (died 1856)
- 1804 – Joseph Howe, Canadian journalist and politician, 5th Premier of Nova Scotia (died 1873)
- 1814 – Ana Néri, Brazilian nurse and philanthropist (died 1880)
- 1816 – Werner von Siemens, German engineer and businessman, founded Siemens (died 1892)
- 1818 – Mary Todd Lincoln, 16th First Lady of the United States (died 1882)
- 1830 – Mathilde Fibiger, Danish feminist, novelist and telegraphist (died 1892)
- 1836 – Franz von Lenbach, German painter and academic (died 1904)
- 1854 – Herman Bavinck, Dutch philosopher, theologian, and academic (died 1921)
- 1856 – Svetozar Boroević, Croatian-Austrian field marshal (died 1920)
- 1860 – Lucien Guitry, French actor (died 1925)
- 1864 – Emil Seidel, American woodcarver and politician, 36th Mayor of Milwaukee (died 1947)
- 1867 – Kristian Birkeland, Norwegian physicist and author (died 1917)
- 1870 – Edward LeSaint, American actor and director (died 1940)
- 1871 – Emily Carr, Canadian painter and author (died 1945)
- 1874 – Josef Lhévinne, Russian pianist and educator (died 1944)
- 1882 – Jane Edna Hunter, African-American social worker (died 1971)
- 1883 – Belle da Costa Greene, American librarian and bibliographer (died 1950)
- 1884 – Aimilios Veakis, Greek actor, director, and playwright (died 1951)
- 1885 – Annie Dale Biddle Andrews, American mathematician (died 1940)
- 1887 – George Pólya, Hungarian-American mathematician and academic (died 1985)
- 1887 – Alvin C. York, American colonel, Medal of Honor recipient (died 1964)
- 1895 – Lucía Sánchez Saornil, Spanish anarchist feminist (died 1970)
- 1897 – Albert Aalbers, Dutch architect, designed the Savoy Homann Bidakara Hotel (died 1961)
- 1897 – Drew Pearson, American journalist and author (died 1969)
- 1900 – Jonel Perlea, Romanian-American conductor and educator (died 1970)

=== 1901–present ===
- 1901 – Olev Roomet, Estonian singer, violinist, and bagpipe player (died 1987)
- 1902 – Panagiotis Kanellopoulos, Greek philosopher and politician, 138th Prime Minister of Greece (died 1986)
- 1902 – Talcott Parsons, American sociologist and academic (died 1979)
- 1903 – Ella Baker, American activist (died 1986)
- 1903 – Carlos Montoya, Spanish guitarist and composer (died 1993)
- 1905 – Ann Barzel, American writer and dance critic (died 2007)
- 1906 – Princess Marina of Greece and Denmark (died 1968)
- 1906 – Laurens van der Post, South African-English soldier and author (died 1996)
- 1908 – Elizabeth Alexander, English geologist, academic, and physicist (died 1958)
- 1908 – Plinio Corrêa de Oliveira, Brazilian historian and activist (died 1995)
- 1908 – Van Heflin, American film actor (died 1971)
- 1911 – Trygve Haavelmo, Norwegian economist and mathematician, Nobel Prize laureate (died 1999)
- 1911 – Kenneth Patchen, American poet and painter (died 1972)
- 1912 – Luiz Gonzaga, Brazilian singer-songwriter and accordion player (died 1989)
- 1913 – Archie Moore, American boxer and actor (died 1998)
- 1914 – Alan Bullock, English historian and author (died 2004)
- 1914 – Larry Noble, English comedian and actor (died 1993)
- 1915 – B. J. Vorster, South African lawyer and politician, 4th State President of South Africa (died 1983)
- 1916 – Leonard Weisgard, American author and illustrator (died 2000)
- 1919 – Hans-Joachim Marseille, German captain and pilot (died 1942)
- 1920 – George P. Shultz, American economist and politician, 60th United States Secretary of State (died 2021)
- 1921 – Turgut Demirağ, Turkish film producer, director and screenwriter (died 1987)
- 1923 – Philip Warren Anderson, American physicist and academic, Nobel Prize laureate (died 2020)
- 1923 – Larry Doby, American baseball player (died 2003)
- 1925 – Dick Van Dyke, American actor, singer, and dancer
- 1927 – James Wright, American poet and academic (died 1980)
- 1928 – Solomon Feferman, American philosopher and mathematician (died 2016)
- 1929 – Christopher Plummer, Canadian actor and producer (died 2021)
- 1931 – Ida Vos, Dutch Jewish author of books for children and adults (died 2006)
- 1933 – Paul Bracq, French automotive designer
- 1934 – Richard D. Zanuck, American film producer (died 2012)
- 1935 – Türkan Saylan, Turkish physician and academic (died 2009)
- 1936 – Prince Karim al-Husayn Shāh, Aga Khan IV, Swiss humanitarian and religious leader (died 2025)
- 1936 – J. C. Martin, American baseball player
- 1937 – Ron Taylor, Canadian physician and baseball player (died 2025)
- 1938 – Gus Johnson, American basketball player (died 1987)
- 1940 – Sanjaya Lall, Indian economist and academic (died 2005)
- 1942 – Howard Brenton, English playwright and screenwriter
- 1942 – Ferguson Jenkins, Canadian baseball player
- 1945 – Herman Cain, American businessman, politician, and activist (died 2020)
- 1948 – Jeff Baxter, American guitarist, songwriter, and producer
- 1948 – Lillian Board, British athlete (died 1970)
- 1948 – Ted Nugent, American musician
- 1950 – Wendie Malick, American actress
- 1952 – Junkyard Dog, American professional wrestler (died 1998)
- 1952 – Muhsin Kenon, American basketball player
- 1953 – Ben Bernanke, American economist
- 1953 – Bob Gainey, Canadian ice hockey player
- 1956 – Phil Hubbard, American basketball player and coach
- 1957 – Steve Buscemi, American actor and director
- 1957 – Morris Day, American musician and actor
- 1959 – Johnny Whitaker, American actor
- 1960 – Richard Dent, American football player
- 1961 – Gary Zimmerman, American football player
- 1962 – Rex Ryan, American football coach and analyst
- 1964 – Krišjānis Kariņš, American-Latvian politician, 23rd Prime Minister of Latvia
- 1965 – Petra Wimmer, Austrian politician
- 1967 – Jamie Foxx, American actor, singer, songwriter, producer, and comedian
- 1969 – Sergei Fedorov, Russian ice hockey player and coach
- 1971 – Scott Sattler, Australian rugby league player
- 1972 – Matti Kärki, Swedish heavy metal singer
- 1975 – Tom DeLonge, American singer-songwriter, guitarist, author, and filmmaker
- 1975 – James Kyson, American actor
- 1975 – Matthew LeCroy, American baseball player and manager
- 1978 – Cameron Douglas, American actor
- 1981 – Amy Lee, American singer, songwriter and pianist
- 1982 – Dan Hamhuis, Canadian ice hockey player
- 1982 – Ricky Nolasco, American baseball player
- 1983 – Laura Hodges, Australian basketball player
- 1984 – Santi Cazorla, Spanish footballer
- 1984 – Hanna-Maria Seppälä, Finnish freestyle swimmer
- 1987 – James Holmes, American mass murderer
- 1988 – Rickie Fowler, American golfer
- 1989 – Hellen Obiri, Kenyan runner
- 1989 – Katherine Schwarzenegger, American author
- 1989 – Taylor Swift, American singer-songwriter
- 1990 – Fletcher Cox, American football player
- 1990 – Joseph Garrett, English YouTuber, actor, and author
- 1990 – Arantxa Rus, Dutch tennis player
- 1991 – Dave Leduc, Canadian martial artist
- 1991 – Vladimir Tarasenko, Russian ice hockey player
- 1993 – Danielle Collins, American tennis player
- 1993 – Jamal Fogarty, Australian rugby league player
- 1995 – Emma Corrin, English actor
- 1996 – Gleyber Torres, Venezuelan baseball player
- 1998 – Ian Seymour, American baseball pitcher
- 1999 – Marina Bassols Ribera, Spanish tennis player
- 2000 – Simona Waltert, Swiss tennis player
- 2001 – Jayden Goodwin, Australian cricketer
- 2002 – Brock Bowers, American football player
- 2009 – Maddox Batson, American singer and songwriter

== Deaths ==
=== Pre-1600 ===
- 558 – Childebert I, Frankish king (born 496)
- 769 – Du Hongjian, Chinese politician (born 709)
- 838 – Pepin I of Aquitaine (born 797)
- 859 – Angilbert II, archbishop of Milan
- 1124 – Pope Callixtus II (born 1065)
- 1126 – Henry IX, Duke of Bavaria (born 1075)
- 1204 – Maimonides, Spanish rabbi and philosopher (born 1135)
- 1250 – Frederick II, Holy Roman Emperor (born 1194)
- 1272 – Bertold of Regensburg, German preacher
- 1404 – Albert I, Duke of Bavaria (born 1336)
- 1466 – Donatello, Italian painter and sculptor (born 1386)
- 1516 – Johannes Trithemius, German cryptographer and historian (born 1462)
- 1521 – Manuel I of Portugal (born 1469)
- 1557 – Niccolò Fontana Tartaglia, Italian mathematician and engineer (born 1499)
- 1565 – Conrad Gessner, Swiss botanist and physician (born 1516)

=== 1601–1900 ===
- 1621 – Katarina Stenbock, queen of Gustav I of Sweden (born 1535)
- 1671 – Antonio Grassi, Italian Roman Catholic priest(born 1592)
- 1716 – Charles de La Fosse, French painter (born 1640)
- 1721 – Alexander Selkirk, Scottish sailor (born 1676)
- 1729 – Anthony Collins, English philosopher and author (born 1676)
- 1754 – Mahmud I, Ottoman sultan (born 1696)
- 1758 – Noël Doiron, Canadian Acadia leader (born 1684)
- 1769 – Christian Fürchtegott Gellert, German poet and hymn-writer (born 1715)
- 1783 – Pehr Wilhelm Wargentin, Swedish astronomer and demographer (born 1717)
- 1784 – Samuel Johnson, English poet and lexicographer (born 1709)
- 1814 – Charles-Joseph, 7th Prince of Ligne, Belgian-Austrian field marshal (born 1735)
- 1849 – Johann Centurius Hoffmannsegg, German botanist and entomologist (born 1766)
- 1862 – Thomas Reade Rootes Cobb, American general, lawyer, and politician (born 1823)
- 1863 – Christian Friedrich Hebbel, German poet and playwright (born 1813)
- 1868 – Carl Friedrich Philipp von Martius, German botanist and explorer (born 1794)
- 1881 – August Šenoa, Croatian author and poet (born 1838)
- 1883 – Victor de Laprade, French poet and critic (born 1812)
- 1893 – Georg August Rudolph, German lawyer and politician, 3rd Mayor of Marburg (born 1816)
- 1895 – Ányos Jedlik, Hungarian physicist and engineer (born 1800)

=== 1901–present ===
- 1908 – Augustus Le Plongeon, French photographer and historian (born 1825)
- 1911 – Reggie Duff, Australian cricketer (born 1878)
- 1919 – Woldemar Voigt, German physicist and academic (born 1850)
- 1922 – Arthur Wesley Dow, American painter and photographer (born 1857)
- 1922 – Hannes Hafstein, Icelandic poet and politician, 1st Prime Minister of Iceland (born 1861)
- 1924 – Samuel Gompers, English-born American labor leader, founded the American Federation of Labor (born 1850)
- 1927 – Mehmet Nadir, Turkish mathematician and academic (born 1856)
- 1929 – Rosina Heikel, Finnish physician (born 1842)
- 1930 – Fritz Pregl, Slovenian-Austrian chemist and physician, Nobel Prize laureate (born 1869)
- 1931 – Gustave Le Bon, French psychologist, sociologist, and anthropologist (born 1840)
- 1932 – Georgios Jakobides, Greek painter and sculptor (born 1853)
- 1935 – Victor Grignard, French chemist and academic, Nobel Prize laureate (born 1871)
- 1942 – Wlodimir Ledóchowski, Austrian-Polish religious leader, 26th Superior-General of the Society of Jesus (born 1866)
- 1942 – Robert Robinson Taylor, American architect (born 1868)
- 1944 – Wassily Kandinsky, Russian-French painter and theorist (born 1866)
- 1945 – Irma Grese, German concentration camp guard (born 1923)
- 1945 – Josef Kramer, German concentration camp commandant (born 1906)
- 1945 – Elisabeth Volkenrath, Polish-German concentration camp supervisor (born 1919)
- 1947 – Henry James, American lawyer and author (born 1879)
- 1947 – Nicholas Roerich, Russian archaeologist, painter, and philosopher (born 1874)
- 1950 – Abraham Wald, Hungarian mathematician and academic (born 1902)
- 1954 – John Raymond Hubbell, American director and composer (born 1879)
- 1955 – Egas Moniz, Portuguese psychiatrist and neurosurgeon, Nobel Prize laureate (born 1874)
- 1960 – Dora Marsden, English author and activist (born 1882)
- 1961 – Grandma Moses, American painter (born 1860)
- 1962 – Harry Barris, American singer-songwriter and pianist (born 1905)
- 1969 – Raymond A. Spruance, American admiral and diplomat, United States Ambassador to the Philippines (born 1886)
- 1973 – Henry Green, English author (born 1905)
- 1974 – Yakup Kadri Karaosmanoglu, Egyptian-Turkish journalist, author, and politician (born 1889)
- 1975 – Cyril Delevanti, English-American actor (born 1889)
- 1975 – Addie Viola Smith, American lawyer and trade commissioner (born 1893)
- 1977 – Oguz Atay, Turkish engineer and author (born 1934)
- 1979 – Jon Hall, American actor and director (born 1915)
- 1979 – Behçet Necatigil, Turkish author, poet and translator (born 1916)
- 1983 – Alexander Schmemann, Estonian-American priest and theologian (born 1921)
- 1983 – Nichita Stănescu, Romanian poet and critic (born 1933)
- 1986 – Heather Angel, British-American actress (born 1909)
- 1986 – Ella Baker, American activist (born 1903)
- 1986 – Smita Patil, Indian actress and journalist (born 1955)
- 1992 – K. C. Irving, Canadian businessman (born 1899)
- 1992 – Cornelius Vanderbilt Whitney, American businessman and philanthropist (born 1899)
- 1993 – Vanessa Duriès, French author (born 1972)
- 1995 – Ann Nolan Clark, American author and educator (born 1896)
- 1996 – Edward Blishen, English author and educator (born 1920)
- 1997 – Don E. Fehrenbacher, American historian, author, and academic (born 1920)
- 1998 – Lew Grade, Ukrainian-born British impresario and media proprietor (born 1906)
- 1998 – Richard Thomas, Royal Naval Officer (born 1922)
- 1998 – Wade Watts, civil rights activist (born 1919)
- 2002 – Zal Yanovsky, Canadian singer-songwriter and guitarist who founded The Lovin' Spoonful (born 1944)
- 2004 – David Wheeler, English computer scientist and academic (born 1927)
- 2005 – Alan Shields, American painter and ferryboat captain (born 1944)
- 2006 – Lamar Hunt, American businessman, co-founded the American Football League and World Championship Tennis (born 1932)
- 2016 – Alan Thicke, Canadian actor, songwriter, game and talk-show host (born 1947)
- 2018 – Noah Klieger, Holocaust survivor who became an award-winning Israeli journalist (born 1926)
- 2022 – Stephen "tWitch" Boss, American dancer and media personality (born 1982)
- 2024 – Lorraine O'Grady, American artist (born 1934)
- 2025 – Juan José Zerboni, Mexican actor (born 1953)

== Holidays and observances ==
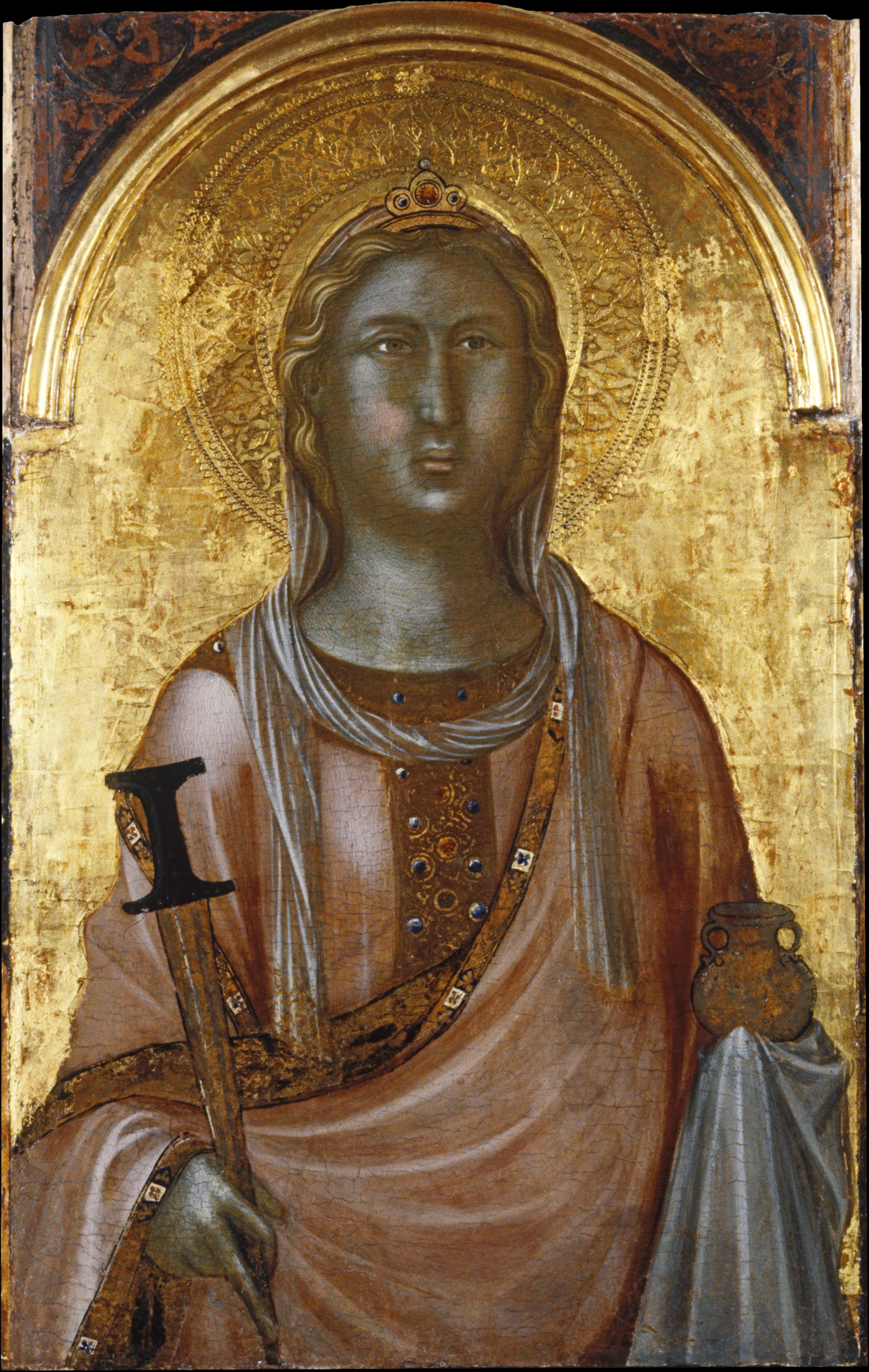
13 December is the feast day of St Lucy.

- Christian feast day:
  - St Antiochus of Sulcis
  - Blessed Francesco Marinoni
  - St Judoc aka St Joyce
  - St Lucy
  - St Odile of Alsace
- Acadian Remembrance Day (Acadians)
- National Day (Saint Lucia)
- Martial Law Victims Remembrance Day (Poland)
- Nanjing Massacre Memorial Day (China)
- Nusantara Day (Indonesia)
- Republic Day (Malta)
- Sailor's Day (Brazil)
- Saint Lucia Day (mainly in Scandinavia)
