= İsmail Rüştü Aksal =

Turkish civil servant and politician

Secretary General of the Republican People's Party
- In office 28 September 1959 – 14 December 1962
- Preceded by: Kasım Gülek
- Succeeded by: Kemal Satır

Minister of Finance of Turkey
- In office 16 January 1949 – 22 May 1950
- Prime Minister: Şemsettin Günaltay
- Preceded by: Hasan Şevket Adalan
- Succeeded by: Halil Ayan

Personal details
- Born: 1911 Pamukova, Sakarya, Ottoman Empire
- Died: 13 September 1989 (aged 77–78) Istanbul, Turkey

İsmail Rüştü Aksal (1911 – September 13, 1989) was a Turkish civil servant and politician.

== Biography ==
He was born in Pamukova district of Sakarya Province in 1911. After graduating from the Istanbul High School in 1930 and Faculty of Political Sciences in 1933, he succeeded in equivalence exam of law. Up to 1946 he served as a civil servant in the Ministry of Finance and the Ministry of Commerce. During the World War II years he served as a finance advisor of the Turkish embassy in London. In 1946 he went into politics and he served in the Turkish parliament in 1946–1950, 1957–1960, 1961–1965 terms. In 1969 he quit politics. He served in the board of management of İş Bankası. He died on 13 September 1989 in Istanbul.

=== As a politician ===
In 1946, he joined the Republican People's Party (CHP) and was elected as the MP from Kocaeli Province. He quickly attracted attention as a finance expert. In the 18th government of Turkey (16 January 1949 – 22 May 1950) he served as the Minister of Finance. During this term he reformed Turkish tax system. Upon the defeat of his party in 1950 general elections he began serving as a lawyer until 1957 when he was elected as the MP from Ankara Province. In 1959 he was elected as the secretary general of CHP with the support of İsmet İnönü, the leader of the party. His term as MP ended on 27 May 1960 by the 1960 Turkish coup d'état. But in 1961 he was appointed as a member of constituent assembly. In the same year following the end of military regime, he was reelected as an MP from Ankara Province. Although he continued to serve in the parliament, in 1962 congress of his party he didn't accept serving another term as the secretary general and he supported his friend Kemal Satır instead. In 1965 general elections, he didn't become a candidate and in 1969 he quit politics.

Preceded by Kasım Gülek	Secretary general of the Republican People's Party; 1959–1962	Succeeded by Kemal Satır
