= Mehmet Emin Erişirgil =

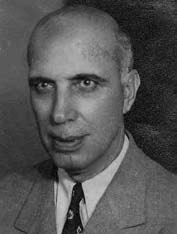

Ministry of Trade (Turkey)
- In office 10 June 1948 – 16 January 1949
- Prime Minister: Hasan Saka
- Preceded by: Şevket Adalan
- Succeeded by: Fazıl Şerafettin Bürge
- In office 16 January 1949 – 22 May 1950
- Prime Minister: Şemsettin Günaltay
- Preceded by: Münir Hüsrev Göle
- Succeeded by: ARüknettin Nasuhioğlu

Ministry of Interior

Personal details
- Born: 1891 Istanbul, Ottoman Empire
- Died: 1 February 1965 Ankara, Turkey
- Party: Republican People's Party (CHP)
- Education: Political Sciences
- Alma mater: Mülkiye Mektebi
- Occupation: Politician and Teacher

Mehmet Emin Erişirgil (1891 – 1 January 1965) was a Turkish teacher, writer and politician who served as Minister of Trade and Minister of Interior. Emin Erişirgil was a member of the commission involved in introducing the modern Turkish alphabet.
