= Istanbul High School =

German public boarding school in Istanbul, Turkey

- İstanbul Erkek Lisesi; Istanbuler Gymnasium

Location
- Istanbul; Turkey
- 41°00′44″N 28°58′26″E

Information
- Type: Public, boarding
- Established: 1884 Numune-i Terakki; 1909 İstanbul Leyli İdadisi; 1910 İstanbul Lisesi; 1913 İstanbul Sultanisi; 1923 İstanbul Erkek Lisesi; 1982 İstanbul Lisesi; 2019 İstanbul Erkek Lisesi
- Principal: Turkish: Cafer Çilenti; German: Thomas Frey
- Enrollment: 1044
- Colors: Yellow and black
- Mascot: Bull
- Website: istanbullisesi.net

Istanbul High School, (Note: Turkish: İstanbul Lisesi, German: Istanbuler Gymnasium) also commonly known as Istanbul Boys' High School, (Note: Turkish: İstanbul Erkek Lisesi, abbreviated (İEL)) is one of the oldest and internationally renowned high schools of Turkey. The school is considered elite among Turkish public high schools. Germany recognizes the school as a German International school. (Note: Deutsche Auslandsschule)

Istanbul High School is located in Cağaloğlu, Istanbul. The school has changed several buildings throughout its history. Since 1933 the school has used its current building. The building was designed by architects Alexander Vallaury and Raimondo D'Aronco and inaugurated in 1882 as the Council of Ottoman Revenues and Debts Administration (Note: Turkish: Düyun-u Umumiye) building, which overlooks the entrance to the Bosporus and the Golden Horn. A new building adjacent to the main historical building was inaugurated in 1984, providing new boarding and sports facilities. The primary languages of instruction are Turkish and German. The secondary foreign language of instruction is English.

== Overview ==
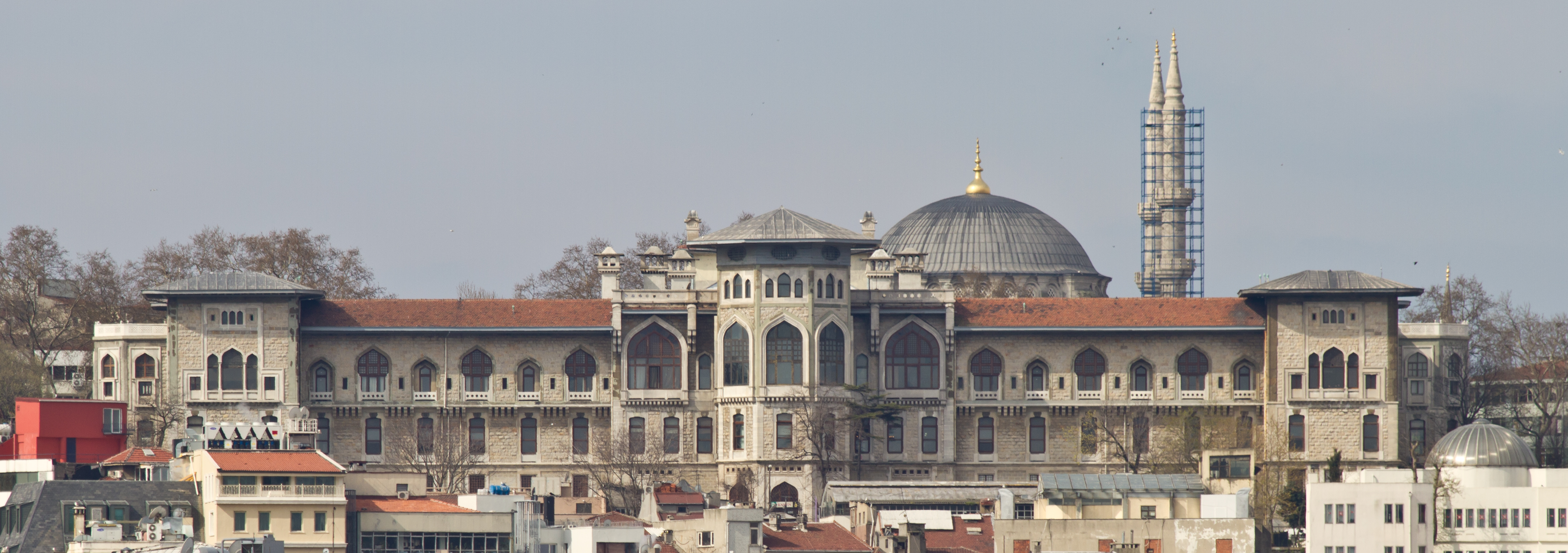
Panoramic view

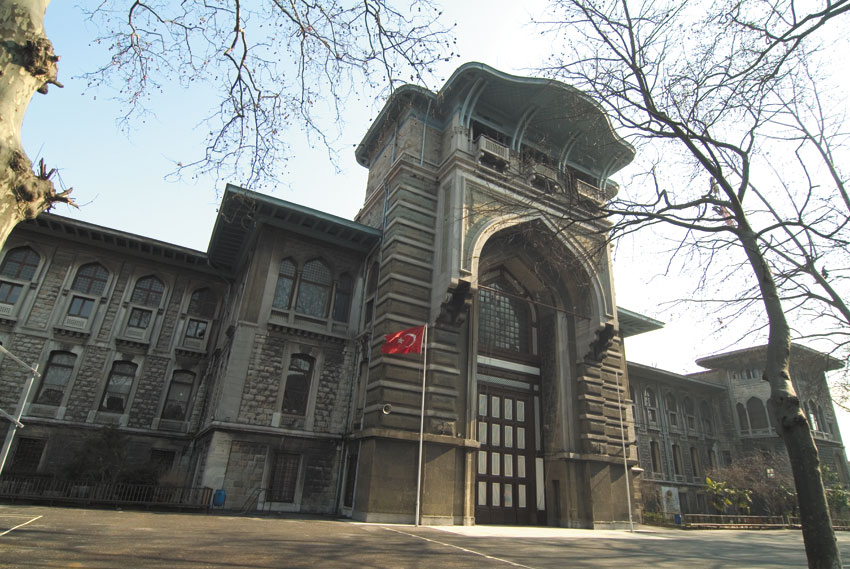
Main entrance outside

As a state school, admissions to Istanbul High School are through the Secondary Education Institutions Transition Exams (LGS), the central state school examination. Istanbul High School is one of the most difficult schools to enter of all the 400 Anadolu Lisesis (special state secondary schools) in the country. Admission to the Istanbul High School requires a tough competition, since only 180 students out of 1,400,000 applicants can make it through every year, and Istanbul High School is usually among the first choices of best ranked students along with Galatasaray High School.The school usually accepts students from the top 600 in Turkey.

The school offers a tuition-free, high level education, providing voluntary boarding possibilities, and as such, draws a diverse group of students from all over Turkey, including students who cannot afford private education. The academic program enables students to pursue academic excellence and acquire fluency and literacy in German and Turkish.

Istanbul High School is the first Turkish school

- to offer private high school education (~ 1886)
- to publish the first student newspaper (before 1887)
- to use the title "Lise", equivalent of 'Lyceum' (1910)
- to provide German education to students (1912)
- to show a movie in the school (~1913) "Les Misérables", shown as "Jean’in Hikayesi" (Jean's Story)
- to establish a student theater group (~1913) staging Abdülhak Hâmid Tarhan's "Eşber" and “Pinti Hamid" (L'avare), a Molière adaptation by Teodor Kasap
- whose students wore hats in Istanbul, following the announcement of the Reform of headgear and dress (1925).

The education period is five years (one year German preparatory, and four year high school). The German Abitur has been offered at Istanbul High School since 2002. The Abitur diploma permits successful students the admission to any German university in almost any department. All science and mathematics courses in the last two years are at Abitur level. Istanbul High School has a very strong academic record, with a high proportion of its students proceeding to prominent universities in Turkey, Germany, Austria and the United States.

== Curriculum ==
The school combines both German and Turkish curricula. Mathematics, geometry, chemistry, physics, biology, computer science and German classes are instructed in German, while history, geography, civic education, military sciences, religion, philosophy, literature, physical education, art and music are taught in Turkish. Textbooks, curricula and standards are under the permanent supervision of the German government. German and English are the compulsory foreign languages taught at Istanbul High School.

Since 1999 Istanbul High School has been a 5-year school. All students are required to spend their first year learning to master the German language, taking twenty-three hours of instruction in their first year and eighteen hours in their second year. Science, mathematics and English courses also start in the preparatory class. Biology is the first science class followed by physics and chemistry in the ninth and tenth grades (second and third years, respectively).

In the eleventh grade the students choose between two majors: Mathematics and Sciences (FEN), or Turkish and Mathematics (TM). Students who aim to pursue careers in engineering, sciences or medicine, major in FEN, concentrating on science and mathematics courses. TM major is dominated by courses in social sciences and mathematics and is for students who want to study humanities, business, economics or social sciences.

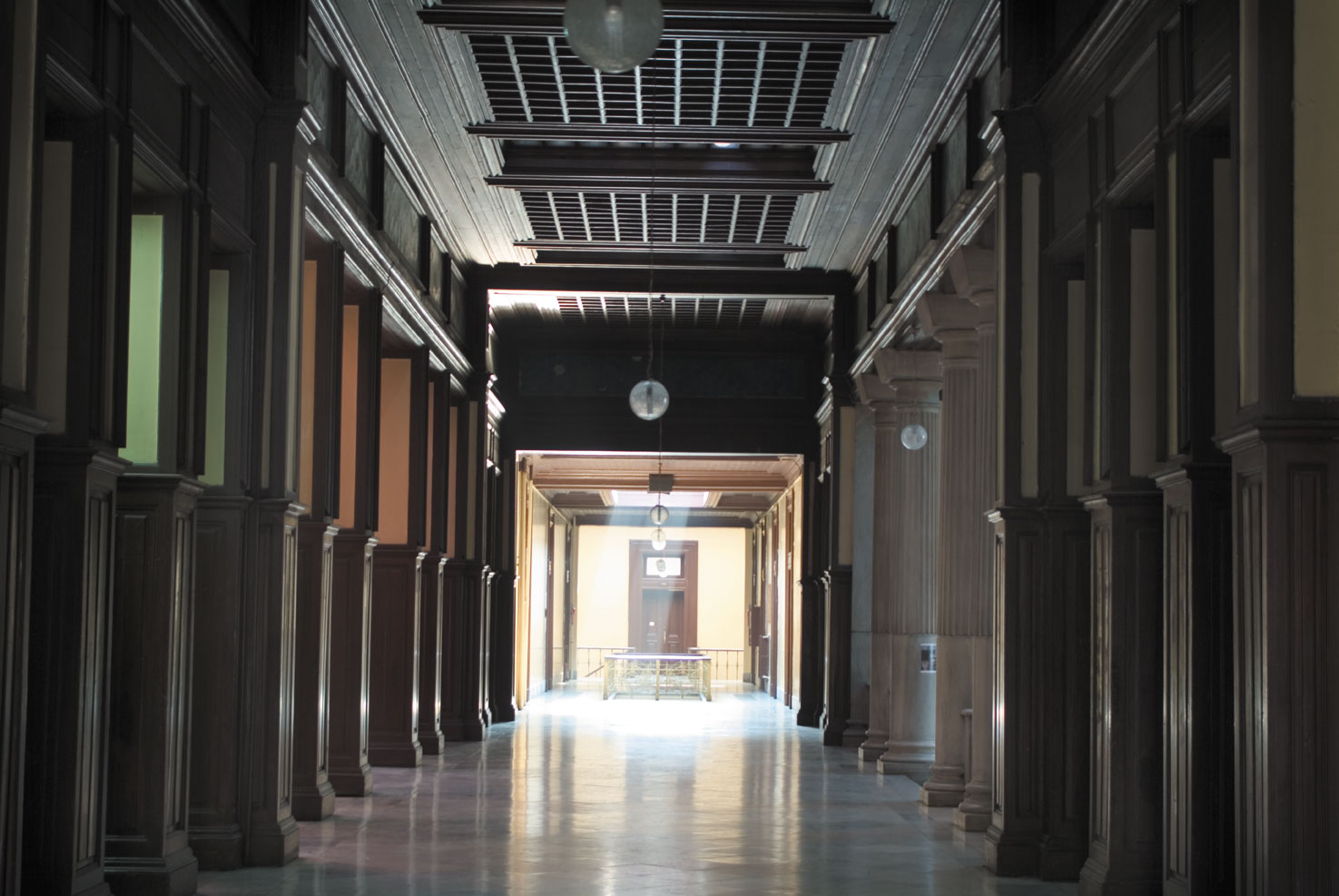
Second floor SW corridor

The academic standards are demanding, and the grading system is strict. As the school follows both German and Turkish curricula, two evaluation scales are used. The grade equivalents in the Turkish evaluation are:

5	4	3	2	1	0
A	B	C	D	E	F
100-85	84-70	69-55	54-45	44-25	24-0

A GPA of 2.0 is a passing grade, 3.5 is honors, 4.5 is high honors. In the German Department student grades are evaluated on a 15 scale:

	15	14	13	12	11	10	9	8	7	6	5	4	3	2	1	0
%	94	89	84	79	74	69	64	59	54	49	44	39	34	27	19	0

== History ==
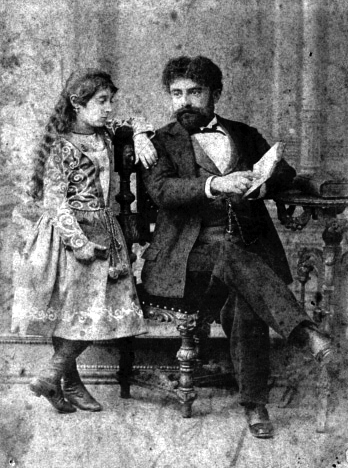
Mehmet Nadir Bey, founder of İstanbul Lisesi, with his daughter

Mehmet Nadir Bey, a retired Captain of the Navy, a prominent mathematician and teacher, together with Selanikli Abdi Kamil Efendi, a school principal, founded in 1882 the first private school in Istanbul, the Şems’ül Maarif (The Sun of Education), but for unknown reasons the partnership did not last long.

Mehmet Nadir Bey established his own private school Numune-i Terakki (The Example of Progress) in 1884, which would be the foundation of İstanbul Lisesi. At the beginning, the school provided primary and middle school education for boys, but would soon add high school classes, and also start accepting girls. In an interview to a newspaper in 1891, Mehmet Nadir Bey would express his pride to have established the first private high school in Turkey. The school would not only attract many students in a short time (the number of students would reach 600 in 1891, of which 150 were boarding students), but also catch the attention of the Ministry of Education, and of the Sultan himself.

After the detection of some teachers’ involvement in an unsuccessful coup to overthrow Abdülhamid II, the school was purchased by the Ministry of Education in 1896, which changed its name to Terakki İdadisi (Progress High School). From 1896 to 1908, the school became a day school, changed several buildings, and according to the facilities occupied, varied in size and number of students. Following the move to a larger building and the legislation combining the 4-year primary school and 3-year middle school into a 5-year education, the school was able to provide boarding again in 1908, and the name of the school was changed to İstanbul Leyli İdadisi (Istanbul Boarding High School) in 1909.

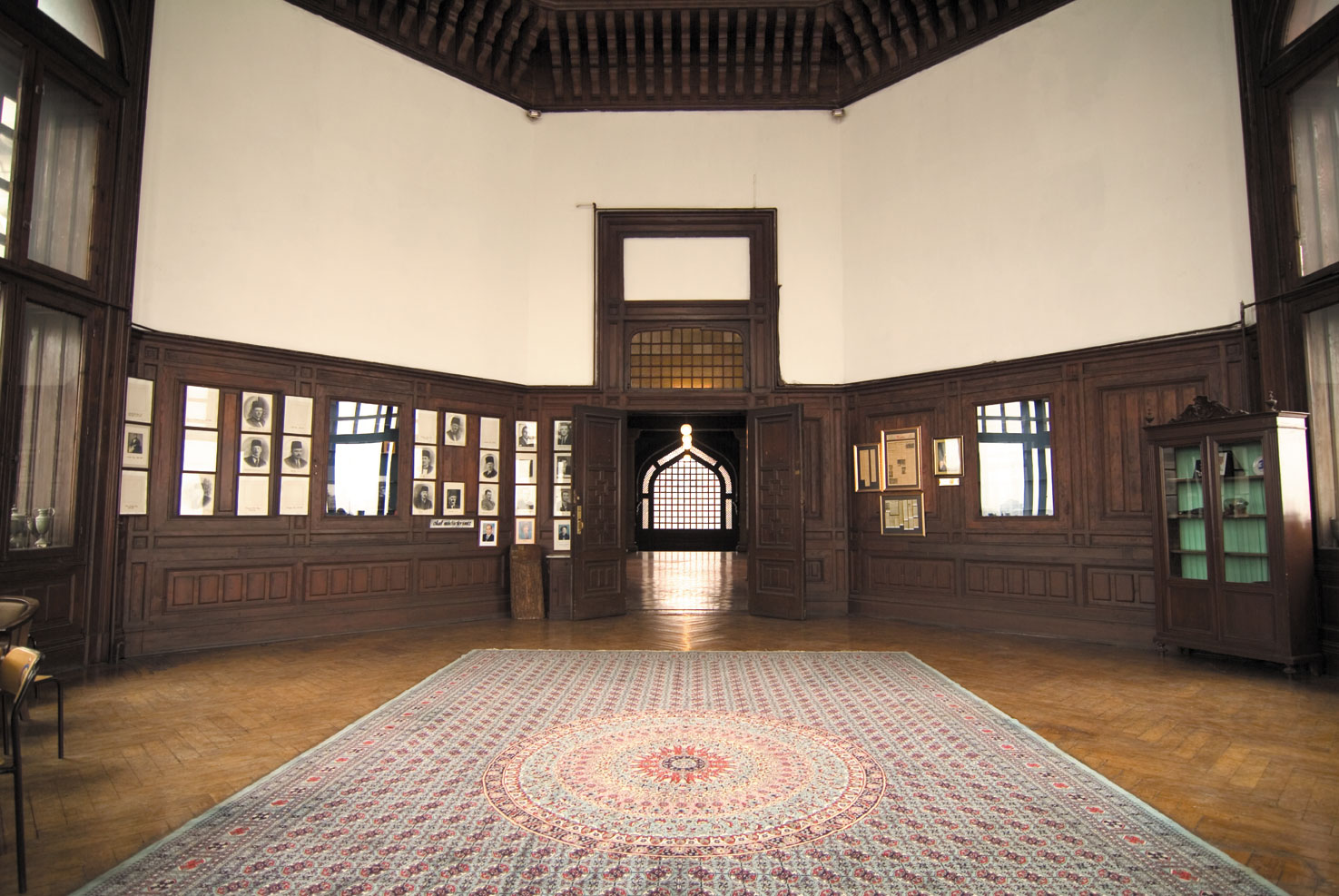
Octagonal Crown Room

In 1910, the school started to use the word Lise (Lyceum), a first in a Turkish school. İstanbul Lisesi was a 5-year boarding school charging tuition, and was admitting students following an examination. The physical education teacher of the school, Abdurrahman Roberson, established İstanbulspor and a boy scout group in 1912. The scout group, later named Sakarya in honor of the Turkish victory in Battle of Sakarya, is still active to this day. Also in 1912, during the First Balkan War, about 30 students volunteered for the defense of the capital against the advancing Bulgarian army.

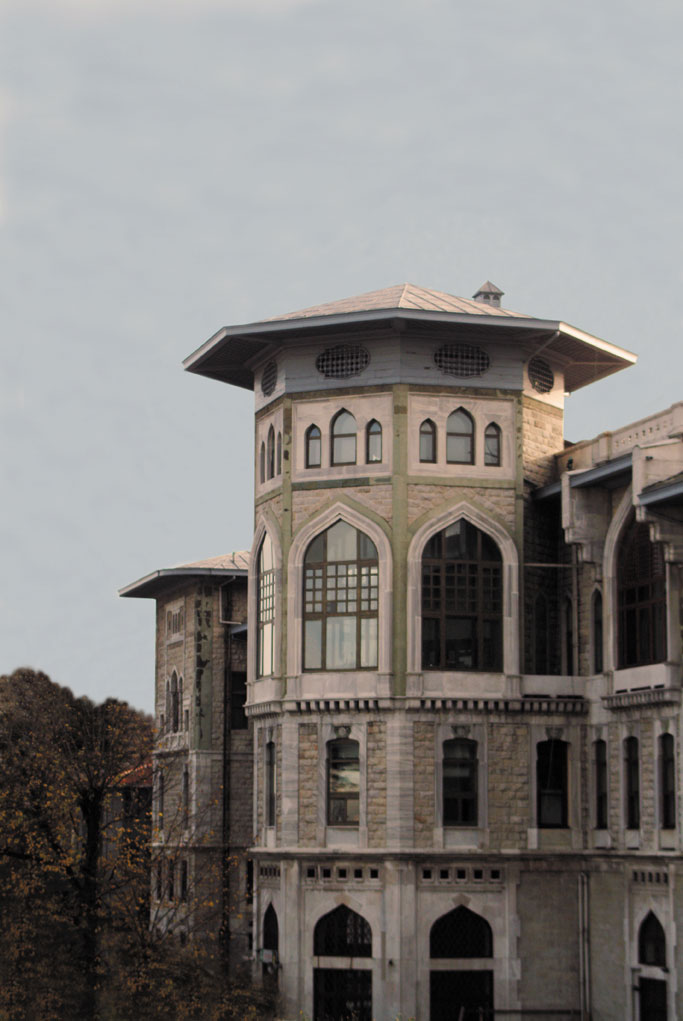
A view of the rear facade

The school name was changed to İstanbul Sultanisi (Istanbul High School) in 1913. Following the closing of the foreign schools in Istanbul due to the beginning of the First World War, İstanbul Sultanisi was moved to the buildings of the Saint Benoit High School, and some parts of the buildings were changed to dormitories. The faculty was supported with the addition of prominent teachers, and the student populace exceeded 1600. Subsequent to the increased collaboration between the German and Ottoman Empires, 22 German teachers were sent by the German Ministry to the school, and the curriculum was changed to German. The curriculum was similar to Galatasaray High School, only the foreign language was German instead of French. The students would take 14 hours of weekly lessons in German, and the same lectures again in Turkish, except history and literature, which were taught only in Turkish.

The Armistice of Mudros, the subsequent occupation of Istanbul, and the incompetence of the government in Istanbul had important effects on the school. As the school was given only 2 days to evacuate the building by the commander of the occupying forces, most of the valuable library and the educational material had to be left behind. The school was not able to find a suitable building for a long time, and some students continued their education in different buildings, sometimes in different schools. Nonetheless, the faculty was still very strong and many of the teachers, such as Hasan Ali Yücel, Mazhar Nedim, Memduh Şevket Esendal, would become the prominent figures and/or leaders that contributed to the shaping of the society, ideological basis, and the governance of the Republic of Turkey. Some of the students and many alumni would join Atatürk in his struggle for independence at very early stages, and some would lose their lives during the battles.

With the declaration of the Republic, the school moved to the Fuat Paşa Mansion in Beyazıt and its name was changed to İstanbul Erkek Lisesi (Istanbul Boys' High School) in 1923. On Atatürk’s instructions, the school moved to the building of the former Düyun-u Umumiye (Council of Ottoman Revenues and Debts Administration) in 1933. During the Second World War the German education was suspended in 1942. Curriculum in German was introduced again in 1958 with the Bilateral Collaboration Agreement on Culture and Education between the Federal Republic of Germany and the Republic of Turkey. Last students of the regular high school curriculum would graduate in 1962, and the school started to admit girls in 1962, although the boarding was only provided to boys. The school remained a 7-year secondary school (1 year of preparatory, 3 years of middle school, and 3 years of high school).

The status of the high school was changed to Anadolu Lisesi, and the name was changed back to İstanbul Lisesi in 1982. In 1988 it gained a special status offering 2 year preparatory, 3 years of middle school, and 3 years of high school education. With the legislation on the extension of the compulsory primary school education from 5 years to 8 years in 2003, the education period was changed to 1 year German Preparatory and 4 year high school.

== School principals ==
Empire

- Abdi Kamil Bey (1884–1885) & (1903–1904)
- Mehmet Nadir Bey (1885–1896)
- Numan Bey (1896–1897)
- Memduh Bey (1897–1900)
- Nadir Bey (1900–1903)
- Ziya Bey (1904–1906)
- Tevfik Danış Bey (1906–1908)
- Ali Reşat Bey (1909–1911)
- Hüseyin Avni Bey (1911–1912)
- Yanyalı Ali Lütfü Bey (1912-1912)
- Ebul Muhsin Bey (1912–1913)
- Süreyya Bey (1913-1814)
- Saffet Bey (1913-1913)
- Hüseyin Hazım Bey (1914–1918)
- Şakir (Seden) Bey (1918–1919)
- Akil Bey (1919–1920)
- Feridun Bey (1920–1921)
- Fuat Bey (1921-1921)
- Ali Haydar Bey (1921–1923)
- Şemsettin Bey (1923–1924)

Republic

- Yanyalı Ali Lütfü Bey (1924–1925)
- Hüseyin Besim Bey (1925–1926)
- Celal Ferdi Gökçay (1926–1936) & (1939–1947)
- Şerif İnan (1936–1939)
- Salim Atalık (1947–1949)
- Rıza Özkut (1950–1951)
- Ahmet Özbey (1951–1960)
- Selman Erdem (1960–1961)
- Halit Özler (1961–1966)
- Muammer Yüzbaşıoğlu (1966–1976)
- Sami Ertek (1976–1979)
- Mahir Yeğmen (1979–1996)
- Kadriye Ardıç (1996–1999)
- Fatma Tan (2000–2003) (by proxy)
- Sadık Tanyeri Akkuş (2003–2004)
- Adnan Ersan (2004–2010)
- Dr. Sakin Öner (2010–2012)
- Hikmet Konar (2015–2018)
- Fatih Güldal (2018–2020)

== School colors ==
In 1914 the buildings of Saint Benoit High School were assigned to the İstanbul Sultanisi. With the beginning of the First World War, some parts of the buildings were converted into a hospital, and as an indication, the building was painted yellow as a sign of hope.

When all the 50 volunteered senior students fell during the Battle of Gallipoli at Kabatepe, on May 19, 1915 at 3:30 am, the remaining students painted all the windows and the doors of the school in black in memoriam.

== School emblem ==

The first school emblem was designed in around 1915/1916. It incorporates the first letters of İstanbul Sultanisi, elif and sin in Arabic, a rose, the star, and the crescent. It was modified by the Turkish sculptor Nejat Sirel (IS '07) in 1917. Sirel's design did not include the rose, whose symbolic meaning, if any, is still unclear.

The final form of the school emblem was designed by Orhan Omay (graduated in 1937) and has been in use since 1970.

== Istanbul High School extracurricular activities ==
=== Publications ===
- Bab-ı Ali – The School's Newspaper published monthly
- Çığlık – The Literature Magazine published quarterly
- Dirim – The Literature Magazine published seasonal
- Numune-i Terakki – The School's Science Magazine published seasonal
- Tarih Odası – The School's bilingual History Magazine published seasonal

=== Sports ===
- Basketball
- Association football
- Fitness
- Handball
- Volleyball
- Table tennis
- Skiing
- Swimming
- Cricket

=== Scouting ===
The Scouting Group of Sakarya is the oldest Scouting Group of Turkey, which was started in 1912 by the PE teacher Abdurrahman Robenson. At the same time the scouting group of Galatasaray was started by his brother Ahmet Robenson.

=== Music ===
- Choir
- German Choir
- Percussion band
- Flute
- Guitar
- Ney
- Piano
- Strings
- German Jazz & Soul Band

=== Clubs ===
- Art and Drawing
- Chess
- Comics
- Computer-Aided Design and 3D Printing Society (IELCAD)
- Dancing
- Go
- Debating
- Society for Entrepreneurship
- French Language
- Film Making and Cinema
- Folklore
- Football
- German Theatre
- History
- Library Science
- Music and Rhythm
- Model United Nations (IELMUNC)
- Philosophy
- Picture and Photography
- Robotics Society (IELTECH)
- Science and Technology
- Scouting (Sakarya İzci Grubu)
- Social Solidarity, Red Crescent and Green Crescent
- Sport
- Technology Student Association (TSA)
- Theatre (İLTAT)
- Society for Science Olympiads (Mathematics, Biology, Chemistry, Physics and Computer Science)
- Travel and Sightseeing

=== Festivals and organizations ===
==== International Chess Festival (Chesstival) ====
The International Chess Festival is held every year since 2001. It starts when the guests arrive and ends after the winners get their prizes. Around 60 schools from both Turkey and other countries, take part each year. The 24th Chesstival was held in April 2025.

==== Culture Week ====
At the end of each academic year, the students and alumni engage in cultural activities, including concerts, discussions with alumni and leading people from art and science circles.

==== IELMUN (Istanbul Erkek Lisesi Model United Nations) ====
Istanbul Erkek Lisesi Model United Nations is a conference by IELMUN Club, in Istanbul, Turkey. Even being a High school MUN Conference, is the world's first and only Model United Nations Conference with three languages English, German and Turkish and also first MUN Conference in German, out of Germany. Because of being a German foreign high school and its other international relations with tens of universities and high schools, hundreds of university and high school students from countries all over the world participate in IELMUN and experience a high academic level and amazing social activities in the capital of culture and history, Istanbul. http://ielmun.org/

== Notable alumni ==
=== Prime ministers ===
- Mesut Yılmaz
- Necmettin Erbakan
- Ahmet Davutoğlu (İEL '77)

=== Ministers ===
- İhsan Sabri Çağlayangil (İEL '28)
- Fuat Köprülü
- Adnan Adıvar
- Zeyyat Baykara
- İsmail Rüştü Aksal
- Mümtaz Tarhan
- Emin Kalafat
- Hüseyin Celal Yardımcı
- Hasan Tahsin Banguoğlu
- Abdullah Aker
- Ahmet Sebati Ataman
- Cemil Sait Barlas
- Yusuf Kenan Bulutoğlu
- Esat Budakoğlu
- Arif Demirer
- Ali Enver Güreli
- Zeyyat Mandalinci
- Cevdet Menteş
- Nedim Ökmen

=== Scientists ===
- Ekrem Akurgal (İEL '31)
- Niyazi Berkes (İEL '28)
- Nurettin Sözen (also former mayor of Istanbul)
- Cahit Arf
- Siyami Ersek

=== Musicians ===
- Hasan Ferit Alnar
- Hüseyin Sadeddin Arel
- Bertuğ Cemil
- Mesut Cemil
- Fecri Ebcioğlu
- Akın Eldes
- Erol Evgin (İEL '65)
- Korhan Futacı (İL '96)
- Ayşe Tütüncü (İEL '78)
- Alaeddin Yavaşca (İEL '44)

=== Artists ===
- Sadri Alışık
- Raik Alnıaçık
- Hakan Altıner (İEL '70)
- Ulaş Tuna Astepe (İL '07)
- Bahadır Baruter
- Orhan Boran
- Fikri Çöze
- Avni Dilligil (İEL '29)
- Savaş Dinçel
- Salih Dizer
- Muhterem Durukan
- Orhan Erçin
- Renan Fosforoğlu (İEL '44)
- Şerif Gören
- İlhan Hemşeri
- Ruşen Kam
- Çetin Köroğlu
- Ercüment Behzat Lav
- Hüseyin Mandal
- Münir Özkul
- Nedret Selçuker (İEL '45)
- Semih Sergen
- Nejat Sirel (İS '17)
- Şener Şen
- Orhan Şener
- Secaattin Tanyerli
- Mesut Cemil Tel

=== Writers ===
- Sait Faik Abasıyanık
- Salim Alparslan (İEL '69)
- Can Ataklı
- Hüseyin Nihal Atsız
- Başar Başarır (İL '87)
- Cevat Fehmi Başkut
- Tanıl Bora (İEL '80)
- Tarık Buğra
- Edip Cansever
- Rakım Çalapala
- Engin Ertan
- Erem Ertekin (İEL '63)
- Necdet Evliyagil
- Kemal Zeki Gençosman
- Hakkı Süha Gezgin
- Banu Güven (İL '87)
- Erol Kaner (İEL '54)
- Ertuğ Karakullukçu
- Evrim Kaya (İL '03)
- Ümit Kıvanç (İEL '74)
- Enis Behiç Koryürek
- Hüseyin Nail Kubalı (İEL '24)
- Raif Ogan
- Turgay Olcayto (İEL '60)
- Kemal Özer
- Çetin Özkırım
- Orhan Özkırım
- Yılmaz Öztürk (İEL '55)
- Adnan Özyalçıner
- Kerim Sadi (İS '19)
- Ali Saydam (İEL '65)
- Ayşe Cemal Sözeri (İEL '76)
- Enver Behnan Şapolyo
- Yeşim Tabak (İL '98)
- Samih Nafiz Tansu (İEL '25)
- Hüsnü Terek (İEL '72)
- Nurettin Topçu
- Naşit Hakkı Uluğ
- Mahmut Yesari

=== Businessmen ===
- Sarp Aral (İEL '79)
- Mehmet Ali Berkman
- Fethi Evyap
- Abdullah Kiğılı (İEL '58)
- Ahmet Kocabıyık
- Asım Kocabıyık
- Mustafa Nezih Kubaç (İEL '79)
- Demir Kunter (İEL '66)
- Mehmet Serdar Sarıgül (İEL '79)
- Murat Ülker
- Sabri Ülker

=== Sports people ===
- Ercan Aktuna
- Cem Atabeyoğlu (İEL '45)
- Orhan Ayhan
- Levent Bıçakcı
- Ahmet Çakar
- Rüştü Dağlaroğlu
- Melih Erçin
- Şükrü Gülesin
- Bülend Karpat (İEL '61)
- Cem Papila
- İsmail Uyanık

=== İEL Alumni Aşure Day ===
Istanbul High School Alumni gather every year in the school, on the first Sunday of Culture Week, to enjoy the traditional Aşure Day.

== See also ==
- Education in the Ottoman Empire

== References and notes ==
=== Books on Istanbul High School ===
- İstanbulspor Kulübü, May 1996
- Terbiye ve Ta'lim-i Etfal-Mehmet Nadir Bey, March 2005
- Duyun-ı Umumiye'den İstanbul Lisesi'ne, April 2006
- Şehadetname, Halide Alptekin, Yitik Hazine Yayınları, March 2007
- Mustafa Kemal'in Yakasındaki Rozet, April 2007
- Numene-i Terrakki- İlk Öğrenci Dergisi, April 2008
- Billur Bir Avizedir İstanbul Lisesinde Zaman-Belgeleriyle 125 Yıl, January 2009
- Türkiye'de Almanca Eğitimin Geleceği, May 2009
- The Political Economy of Ottoman Public Debt: Insolvency and European Financial Control in the Late Nineteenth Century, Murat Birdal, September 2010
