= Turgut Göle =

Turkish lawyer and politician (1913–2002)

Personal details
- Born: 1913 Ardahan, Ottoman Empire
- Died: 31 January 2002 (aged 88–89)
- Party: Republican People's Party; Republican Reliance Party
- Children: 2, including Nilüfer Göle
- Education: Ankara University; Indiana University

Turgut Göle (1913–2002) was a Turkish politician from the Republican People's Party (CHP) and served at the Parliament and also, at the Senate. He left the CHP and joined the Republican Reliance Party in 1967. Before his political career he worked as a district governor and then, a lawyer.

== Early life and education ==
He was born in Ardahan, Ottoman Empire, in 1913. His family was originally from Dedeşen village of Göle district, Ardahan. His sister was married to Münir Hüsrev Göle, a politician.

After graduating from Istanbul High School in 1934, he obtained a degree from the Faculty of Political Sciences at Ankara University in 1937. Then he earned his Master of Arts degree at Indiana University, USA.

Göle also received a degree in law from Ankara University in the early 1950s.

== Career ==
Following his return to Turkey Göle worked at various public institutions, including the General Directorate of Security. Then he served as the district governor of Hafik (18 October 1943 – 17 February 1944), Çubuk, Gündoğmuş and Gölbaşı. From 1953 he worked as a freelance lawyer. Next he was elected as a deputy from the CHP representing Kars and served at Parliament during the X. term between 2 May 1954 and 1 November 1957. He also won his seat from Kars serving at the Parliament's XI. term from 1 November 1957 to 27 May 1960. Göle was one of the signatories of a declaration issued on 4 September 1957 which demanded the detailed inclusion of the fundamental rights and freedoms in the constitution, the establishment of a Constitutional Court and the adoption of the bicameral system. The other signatories of the statement included İsmet İnönü, Fevzi Lütfi Karaosmanoğlu, Fuat Arna, Kasım Gülek, Enver Güreli, Ahmet Bilgin, İbrahim Öktem and Nurettin Ardıçoğlu.

Göle was a member of the Turkish Group at the Consultative Assembly of the Council of Europe for two terms from 29 April 1957 to 1 May 1958 and from 19 September 1962 to 1 May 1963.

Following the military coup on 27 May 1960 the rule of the Democrat Party ended, and a Constituent Assembly was formed. Göle was made a member of the Assembly on 6 January 1961 and held the post until 25 October 1961. He was elected as a senator for the CHP in October 1961 from Kars and served at the Senate until 7 June 1964. He was expelled from the party for one year in 1963 due to his alleged contact with Talat Aydemir who was the leader of a failed military coup. In the same incident other CHP politicians, including Nihat Erim, Avni Doğan and Kasım Gülek, were also expelled from the party.

In the general election of 1965 Göle was again elected as a deputy for the CHP from Kars. He left the CHP in 1967 and was involved in the establishment of the Republican Reliance Party led by Turhan Feyzioğlu. Göle was elected as a member of the party's administrative board in the second congress held in Ankara on 28 October 1970.

== Personal life and death ==
Göle was married to the sister of Ali Bozer and Yüksel Bozer, former president of Hacettepe University. He had two children: Nilüfer Göle and Celal Göle.

Göle died on 31 January 2002.
