= 1950 Wisconsin lieutenant gubernatorial election =

- November 7, 1950
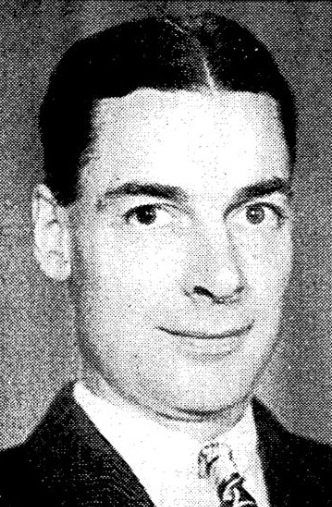

Nominee	George M. Smith	Eugene R. Clifford
Party	Republican	Democratic
Popular vote	617,668	480,696
Percentage	56.02%	43.60%
- County results Smith: 50–60% 60–70% 70–80% 80–90% Clifford: 50–60%
Lieutenant Governor before election
George M. Smith
Republican
Elected Lieutenant Governor
George M. Smith
Republican

The 1950 Wisconsin lieutenant gubernatorial election was held on November 7, 1950, in order to elect the lieutenant governor of Wisconsin. Incumbent Republican lieutenant governor George M. Smith defeated Democratic nominee Eugene R. Clifford and Social-Democratic nominee Rudolph Beyer.

== Republican primary ==
The Republican primary election was held on September 19, 1950. Incumbent lieutenant governor George M. Smith received a majority of the votes (61.85%), and was thus elected as the nominee for the general election.

=== Results ===
1950 Republican lieutenant gubernatorial primary
Party	Candidate	Votes	%
Republican	George M. Smith (incumbent)	237,488	61.85%
Republican	Schultz	146,464	38.15%
Total votes		383,952	100.00%

== Democratic primary ==
The Democratic primary election was held on September 19, 1950. Candidate Eugene R. Clifford received a majority of the votes (59.11%) over former member of the Wisconsin Senate Harold A. Lytie, and was thus elected as the nominee for the general election.

=== Results ===
1950 Democratic lieutenant gubernatorial primary
Party	Candidate	Votes	%
Democratic	Eugene R. Clifford	90,417	59.11%
Democratic	Harold A. Lytie	62,548	40.89%
Total votes		152,965	100.00%

== Social-Democratic primary ==
The Social-Democratic primary election was held on September 19, 1950. Candidate Rudolph Beyer ran unopposed and was thus elected as the nominee for the general election.

=== Results ===
1950 Social-Democratic lieutenant gubernatorial primary
Party	Candidate	Votes	%
Social-Democratic	Rudolph Beyer	1,988	100.00%
Total votes		1,988	100.00%

== General election ==
On election day, November 7, 1950, incumbent Republican lieutenant governor George M. Smith won re-election by a margin of 136,972 votes against his foremost opponent Democratic nominee Eugene R. Clifford, thereby retaining Republican control over the office of lieutenant governor. Smith was sworn in for his second term on January 1, 1951.

=== Results ===
Wisconsin lieutenant gubernatorial election, 1950
Party	Candidate	Votes	%
Republican	George M. Smith (incumbent)	617,668	56.02
Democratic	Eugene R. Clifford	480,696	43.60
Social-Democratic	Rudolph Beyer	4,272	0.38
Total votes		1,102,636	100.00
Republican hold			
