= Tayyibe Gülek =

Turkish politician and economist

Tayyibe Gülek (born 1968, Ankara) is a Turkish economist and politician.

== Biography ==
Gulek received her B.A. with honors in economics from Harvard University in 1991 and her M.Sc. degree in 1992 from the London School of Economics. She started her professional career as an advisor to the Chief Coordinator of Economic Policy at the Prime Ministry where she worked on projects such as the Baku-Tbilisi-Ceyhan pipeline, economics coordination, European Community coordination, and the Southeastern Anatolia Project.

In 1999, she was elected to the Turkish Grand National Assembly (parliament) representing Adana for the Democratic Left Party. During her term in office, she was a member of the Turkish delegation to the Parliamentary Assembly of the Council of Europe, where she was Vice Chair of the Committee on Human Rights, member of the Committee on Health and Family Affairs, and a member of the Committee on Equality between Men and Women. In 2002, she became Minister of State responsible for Cyprus and for Turks living abroad.

She is the daughter of the Kasım Gülek.
