= 1950 Ecuadorian parliamentary election =

Parliamentary elections were held in Ecuador on 4 June 1950.

== Results ==
Party	Votes	%
Conservative Party	70,807	27.47
Ecuadorian Radical Liberal Party	29,411	11.41
Unnamed List	26,121	10.13
Others	131,429	50.99
Total	257,768	100.00
Valid votes	257,768	93.11
Invalid/blank votes	19,063	6.89
Total votes	276,831	100.00
Registered voters/turnout	431,794	64.11
Source: Nohlen
