= 1950 California lieutenant gubernatorial election =

- November 7, 1950
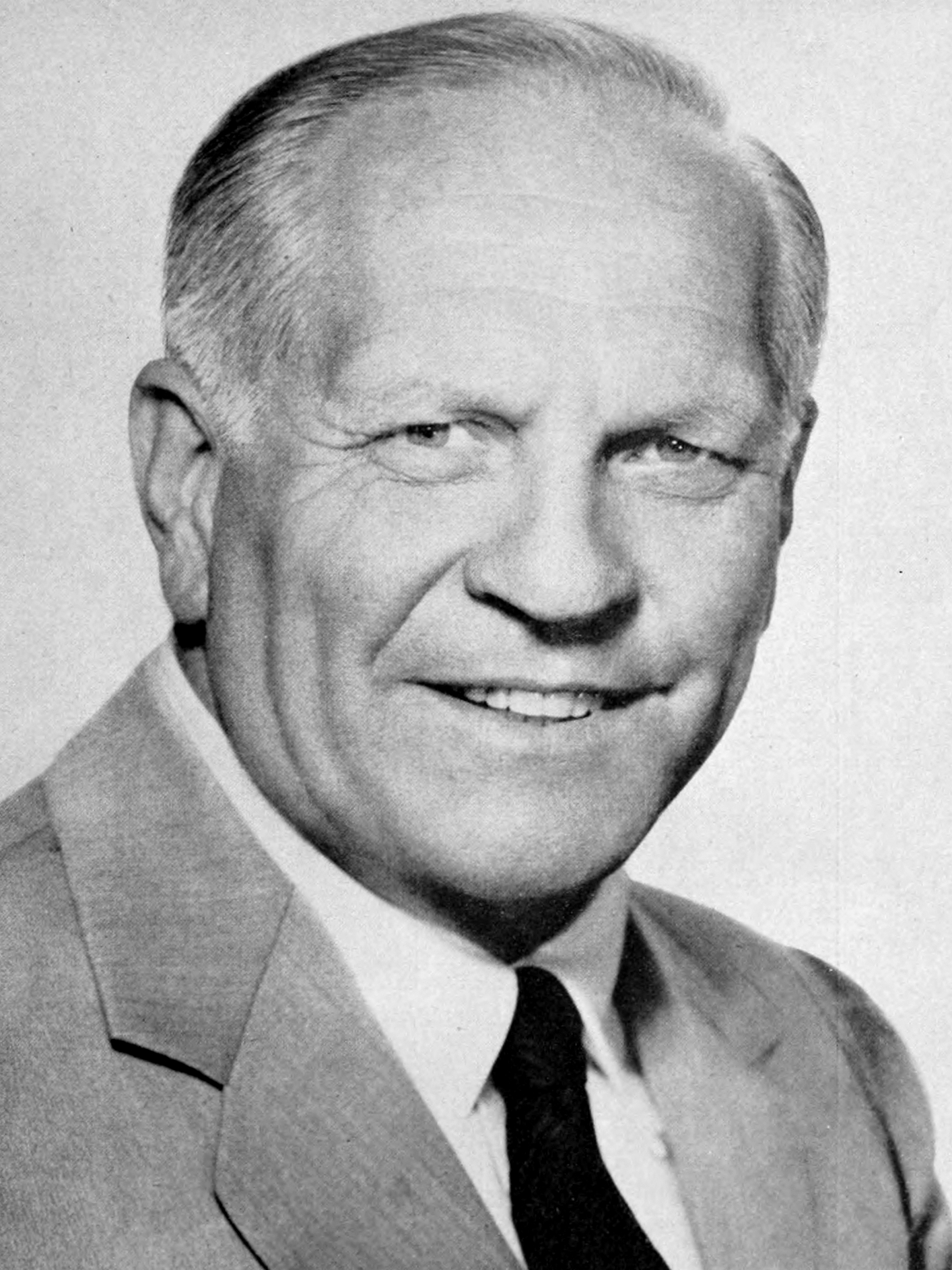

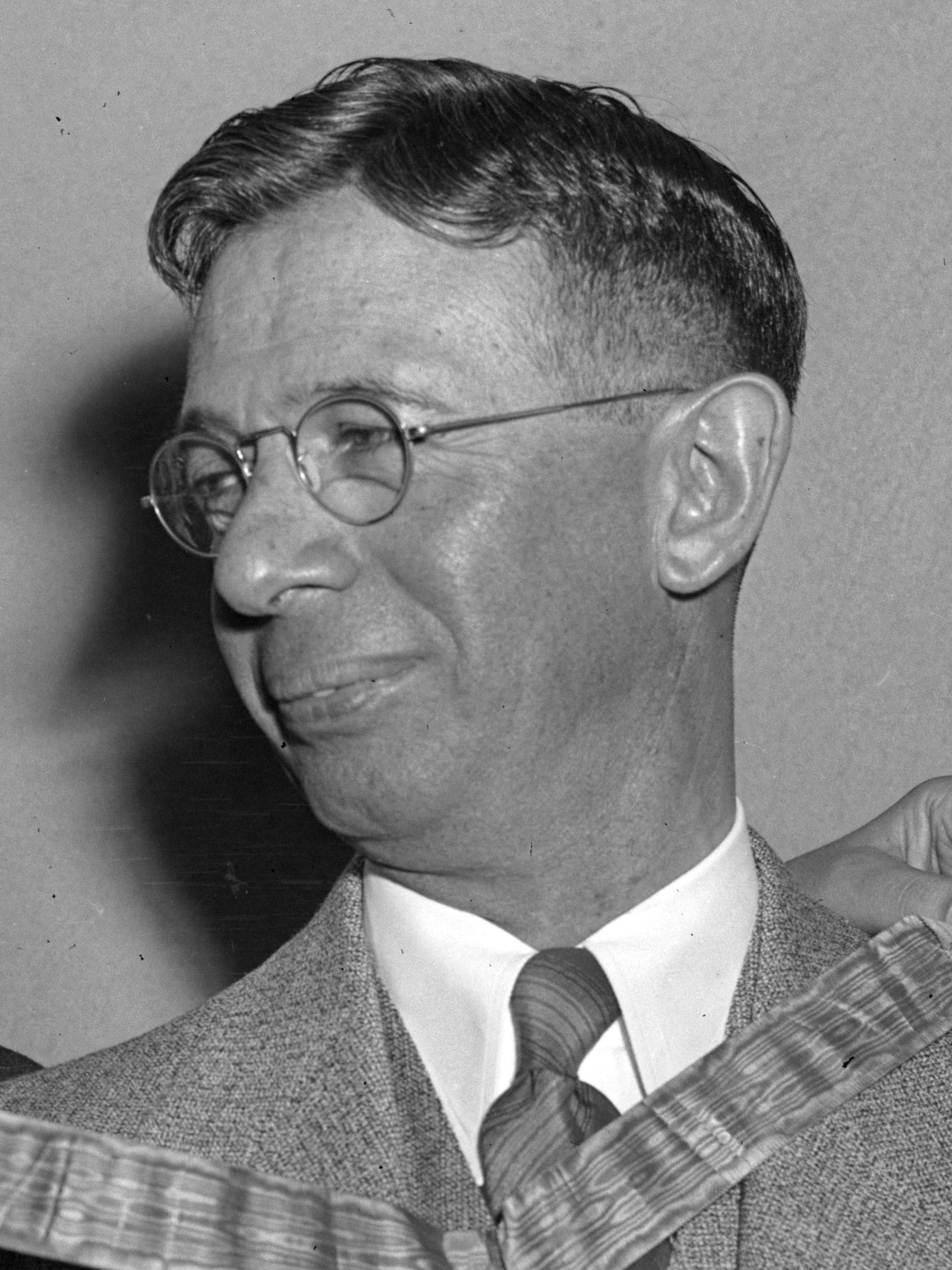
Nominee	Goodwin Knight	Monroe Deutsch
Party	Republican	Write-in
Popular vote	3,089,278	557
Percentage	99.90%	0.02%
- County results Knight: 90–100%
Lieutenant Governor before election
Goodwin Knight
Republican
Elected Lieutenant Governor
Goodwin Knight
Republican

The 1950 California lieutenant gubernatorial election was held on November 7, 1950, in order to elect the Lieutenant Governor of California. Incumbent Republican Lieutenant Governor Goodwin Knight easily won re-election against Write-in candidate Monroe Deutsch.

== General election ==
On election day, November 7, 1950, Republican nominee Goodwin Knight won re-election by a margin of over 3 million votes against write-in candidate Monroe Deutsch, thereby retaining Republican control over the office of Lieutenant Governor. Knight was sworn in for his second term on January 3, 1951.

=== Results ===
California lieutenant gubernatorial election, 1950
Party	Candidate	Votes	%
Republican	Goodwin Knight (incumbent)	3,089,278	99.90
Write-in	Monroe Deutsch	557	0.02
Scattering		2,593	0.08
Total votes		3,092,428	100.00
Republican hold			
