= Münir Hüsrev Göle =

Turkish politician (1890–1955)

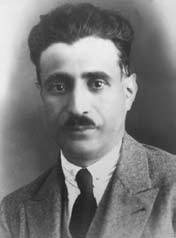

Minister of Interior
- In office 5 September 1947 – 16 January 1949
- President: İsmet İnönü
- Prime Minister: Recep Peker; Hasan Saka

Personal details
- Born: 1890 Bayburt, Ottoman Empire
- Died: 21 August 1955 (aged 64–65)
- Party: Republican People's Party
- Other political affiliations: Progressive Republican Party
- Children: 4

Münir Hüsrev Göle (1890–1955) was a Turkish politician who was cofounder of the Republican People's Party. He served as the minister of interior between 1947 and 1949. He was a member of the Turkish Parliament for four terms.

== Early life and education ==
Göle was born in Bayburt in 1890. He received a degree in political science in 1912.

== Career ==
Göle worked at the Ministry of Interior and served as a district governor. He was mutasarrıf or governor of Afyonkarahisar. While working in Birecik, Şanlıurfa, he established a defense force group supporting the movement led by Mustafa Kemal and actively involved in the defeat of the French army in the region.

Göle was among the nine founders of the Republican People's Party which was established on 9 September 1923. Following the establishment of the Republic of Turkey he was elected to the Parliament from Erzurum. After serving at the Parliament between 1923 and 1927 he resumed his bureaucratic service. In 1925 he left the Republican People's Party and joined the Progressive Republican Party. He was arrested and tried for his alleged role in the assassination attempt against Mustafa Kemal. Later he was acquitted and released from the prison.

Göle was again elected to the Parliament in 1934 and served in the sixth term as a deputy of Erzurum. He also held the post for the seventh and eighth terms. On 5 September 1947 Göle was appointed minister of interior in the cabinet led by Prime Minister Recep Peker. Peker resigned from the office on 9 September and was replaced by Hasan Saka. Göle continued to serve as the minister of interior in the Saka cabinet. Göle was given the same post in the next cabinet formed by Hasan Saka on 10 June 1948. Göle remained in office until 16 January 1949.

== Personal life and death ==
He was married to the sister of Turgut Göle who was also a politician. He had four children.

Göle died on 21 August 1955.

=== Awards ===
Göle was the recipient of the medal of independence.
