= 1950 Brampton municipal election =

The Brampton municipal election, 1950 was held January 2, 1950, in Brampton, Ontario. The election covered the positions of Mayor, Reeve, Deputy-Reeve, Councillors, Water Commissioner, Hydro-Electric Commissioner, and members of the Brampton Public School board.

Jack Galway was the Town Clerk.

== Timeline ==
- December 15, 1949: The Conservator reports that H. R. Lawrence will seek re-election. Cecil L. Gott denies he will seek office, despite weeks of rumour; Gott has "no intention of re-entering the municipal political field." Gott was the Warden of Peel County (1945), reeve of Bolton (five years), councillor in Bolton (two years), member of the Bolton High School board (five years). Reeve I. W. Kellam and deputy reeve J. A. McLaughlin plan to seek re-election. Four of six councillors had confirmed intention to run again: W. George Thompson, J. A. McCleave, D. W. Ewles, and C. Carman Core. As of December 14, B. Harper Bull and A. Dyball were undecided.
- December 19, 1949: Town council of 1949 has their last meeting, having passed 61 bylaws in the year. A. Dyball has mentioned he will seek re-election, and B. Harper Bull is still undecided.
- December 22, 1949: The Conservator reports that Brampton Hydro Commission Chairman W. J. Abell will seek re-election for the 1950–1951 term. The paper also reports John Patterson will seek re-election to the water commission; Patterson was elected in January 1949 for just one year, to fill the spot caused by Commissioner J. P. Worthy's death.
- December 22, 1949: The Conservator notes that public school board Chairman C. O. Carscadden, and two year board members Homer Thompson and Alan Burton are all not seeking re-election. John C. Enns was to serve a two-year term; he had recently moved to Hamilton, however. This leaves one seat in both the South and West Wards, and two in the North Ward. East Ward's Walter Smart, first elected in 1948, will stand for re-election. G. T. Vivian, John S. Beatty, and Wally Large are in their first of two years.
- December 26, 1949, 10 to 11 am: Nomination day for all positions, in the Council Chambers of the Municipal Offices. Nominees had to be "seconded seriatium".
- December 26, 1949, 8 pm: Public meeting at the Orange Hall; all candidates could state their platforms.
- January 2, 1950: Polling day, from 9 am to 7 pm. Polls were held at the East Ward at Orange Hall, North Ward at Central Public School, West Ward at Umphrey Motors Ltd. (at Main and Church Streets), and South Ward at the Odd Fellows Hall.
