= Nizamettin Erkmen =

Turkish politician

Turkish Deputy Prime Minister
- In office 15 April 1973 – 26 January 1974
- Succeeded by: Necmettin Erbakan

Personal details
- Born: 1919 Giresun, Ottoman Empire
- Died: 24 October 1990 (aged 71)

Nizamettin Erkmen (1919 - 1990) was a Turkish politician.

== Biography ==
=== Early life and education ===
Nizamettin Erkmen was born in Görele, Turkey. He attended Istanbul University - School of Public Administration.

=== Career ===
After graduation in 1943, he served as Maiyet Memuru for Giresun Valiliği and Bucak Müdürlüğü at Yavuzkemal. Following his military service, he served as Deputy Governor in Keşap, Şenkaya, and Şebinkarahisar. He served as Governor of towns of Akseki, Fatsa, Söke, and Yalova through 1960.

In 1960, when he was the Governor in Yalova, a military coup toppled the governing Adnan Menderes administration. The military regime that put Nizamettin Erkmen's brother Hayrettin Erkmen, who was serving as Minister of Trade at the time, in jail for unsubstantiated charges, also removed Nizamettin Erkmen from his Governorship duties. This event set the stage for entry of Mr. Erkmen into the Turkish political arena. By completing the extra course requirements of Faculty of Law, he became a lawyer in 1961.

In 1961 he became the Director of Legal Affairs for the Government in city of Samsun. Shortly after, he signed up with Yeni Turkiye Party, ran for Member of Parliament for Giresun in the general elections and got elected. In the following 19 years he participated in active politics and represented Giresun in the Parliament, winning a seat in all of the subsequent general elections.

He served as General Secretary of Justice Party as well as the Deputy Prime Minister and Minister of Interior Affairs under Naim Talu administration in 1973.

He was married to Muzaffer Erkmen (1921 - 2006).

=== Death ===
Erkmen died on 24 October 1990.

Political offices
Preceded by Sadi Koçaş; Atilla Karaosmanoğlu	Deputy Prime Minister of Turkey; 15 April 1973 - 26 January 1974	Succeeded by Necmettin Erbakan
