= 1950 Connecticut lieutenant gubernatorial election =

- November 7, 1950
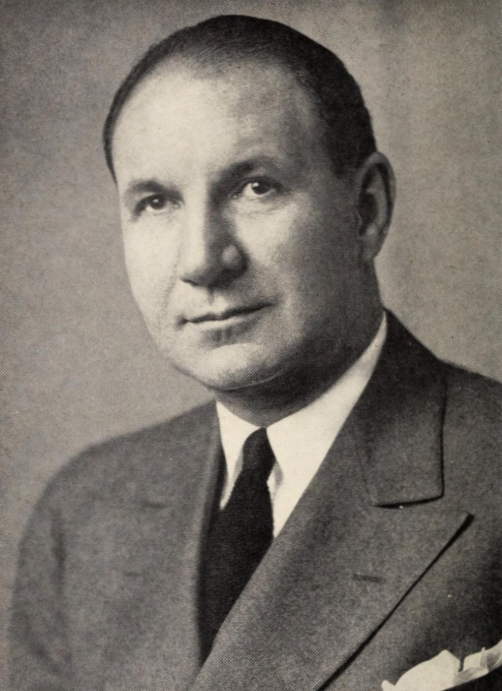

Nominee	Edward N. Allen	William T. Carroll
Party	Republican	Democratic
Popular vote	433,632	427,034
Percentage	50.38%	49.62%
- Allen: 50–60% 60–70% 70–80% 80–90% Carroll: 50–60% 60–70%
Lieutenant Governor before election
William T. Carroll
Democratic
Elected Lieutenant Governor
Edward N. Allen
Republican

The 1950 Connecticut lieutenant gubernatorial election was held on November 7, 1950 in order to elect the lieutenant governor of Connecticut. Republican nominee and former mayor of Hartford Edward N. Allen defeated Democratic nominee Dennis M. Carroll. This was the first lieutenant gubernatorial election since the law was changed to have Connecticut's lieutenant governors elected every four years, instead of every two years, as had been done previously.

== General election ==
On election day, November 7, 1950, Republican nominee Edward N. Allen won the election by a margin of 6,598 votes against his opponent Democratic nominee Dennis M. Carroll, thereby gaining Republican control over the office of lieutenant governor. Allen was sworn in as the 92nd lieutenant governor of Connecticut on January 3, 1951.

=== Results ===
Connecticut lieutenant gubernatorial election, 1950
Party	Candidate	Votes	%
Republican	Edward N. Allen	433,632	50.38%
Democratic	Dennis M. Carroll	427,034	49.62%
Total votes		860,666	100.00%
Republican gain from Democratic			
