= 1950 Texas lieutenant gubernatorial election =

- November 7, 1950

Nominee	Ben Ramsey	Marjorie McCorquodale
Party	Democratic	Republican
Popular vote	352,718	39,080
Percentage	90.03%	9.97%
Lieutenant Governor before election
Vacant
Elected Lieutenant Governor
Ben Ramsey
Democratic

The 1950 Texas lieutenant gubernatorial election was held on November 7, 1950, in order to elect the lieutenant governor of Texas. Democratic nominee and former Secretary of State of Texas Ben Ramsey defeated Republican nominee Marjorie McCorquodale.

== General election ==
On election day, November 7, 1950, Democratic nominee Ben Ramsey won the election by a margin of 313,638 votes against his opponent Republican nominee Marjorie McCorquodale, thereby retaining Democratic control over the office of lieutenant governor. Ramsey was sworn in as the 34th lieutenant governor of Texas on January 16, 1951.

=== Results ===
Texas lieutenant gubernatorial election, 1950
Party	Candidate	Votes	%
Democratic	Ben Ramsey	352,718	90.03
Republican	Marjorie McCorquodale	39,080	9.97
	Scattering	8	0.00
Total votes		391,806	100.00
Democratic hold			
