= Nilüfer Göle =

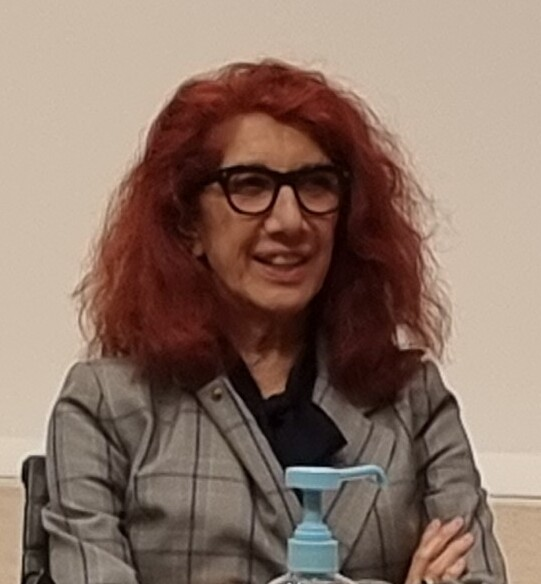
Göle in 2021

Nilüfer Göle (born 1953) is a Turkish sociologist and a contemporary Turkish academic who specializes in the political movement of today's educated, urbanized, and religious Muslim women.

== Biography ==
She is the daughter of Turgut Göle, a politician from the Republican People's Party.

From 1986 to 2001, she was a professor at the Boğaziçi University in Istanbul. She is currently Directrice d'études at the École des hautes études en sciences sociales (EHESS), Centre d’Analyse et d’Intervention Sociologiques (CADIS), in Paris. Göle is the author of Interpénétrations: L’Islam et l’Europe and The Forbidden Modern: Civilization and Veiling. (Note: This title is a mistranslation of the original Turkish title, Modern Mahrem, which actually means the modern taboo. It may be that the mistranslation is due to the fact that Göle is more comfortable with French, where the adjective generally follows the noun it modifies.) Through personal interviews, Göle has developed detailed case studies of young Turkish women who are turning to the tenets of fundamental Islamic gender codes. Her sociological approach, which is underpinned with Socialist and Marxist ideology, has also produced a broader critique of Eurocentrism with regard to emerging Islamic identities at the close of the twentieth century. She has explored the specific topic of covering, as well as the complexities of living in a multicultural world.

She holds French citizenship.

== Selected publications ==
- Interpénétrations: L’Islam et l’Europe. (Paris: Galaade Editions, 2005).
- “Islamisme et féminisme en Turquie: regards croisés,” in Le foulard islamique en questions (Paris: Éditions Amsterdam, 2004).
- Ed. with Ludwig Ammann, Islam in Sicht. Der Auftritt von Muslimen im öffentlichen Raum. (Bielefeld: Transcript-Verlag, 2004).
- The Forbidden Modern: Civilization and Veiling. (Ann Arbor: University of Michigan Press, 1997).
