= 1950 Turkish presidential election =

Election of Celâl Bayar

- 22 May 1950
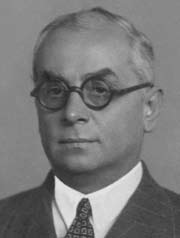

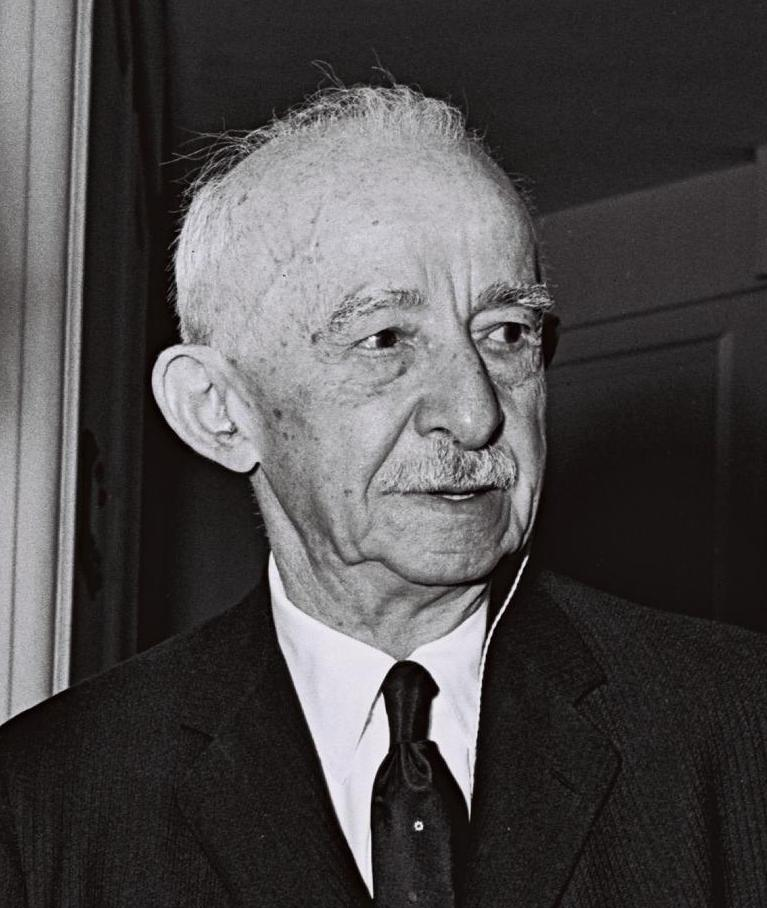
Nominee	Celâl Bayar	İsmet İnönü
Party	DP	CHP
Popular vote	387	66
Percentage	85.43%	14.57%
President before election
İsmet İnönü
CHP
Elected President
Celâl Bayar
DP

Indirect presidential elections were held in Turkey on 22 May 1950. This was the first time candidates from other parties than the ruling CHP were admitted. 453 out of 487 members of the Grand National Assembly participated in the elections, which were held as required by law immediately after the election of the members of the ninth parliament. Democrat Party chairman Celâl Bayar was elected president with 387 votes in the first round. Then president and CHP Chairman İsmet İnönü lost the elections with 66 votes. In the same year the 1950 Turkish general election were held.

== Results ==
Candidate	Party	Votes	%
Celâl Bayar	Democrat Party	387	85.43
İsmet İnönü	Republican People's Party	66	14.57
Total		453	100.00
Valid votes		453	93.02
Invalid/blank votes		34	6.98
Total votes		487	100.00
Registered voters/turnout		487	100.00
