= Mehmet Nadir =

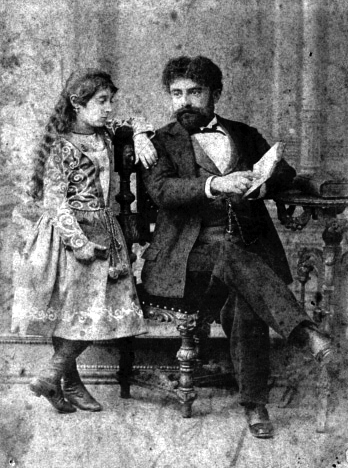
Mehmet Nadir Bey, with daughter Hediye.

Mehmet Nadir (1856 – 13 December 1927) was a Turkish mathematician, politician, and educator.

== Early life ==
He was born in Sakız island (modern Chios in Greece) then a part of the Ottoman Empire, to a poor family. He was adopted by a sea captain, who would be his father-in-law in the future. He studied in the military high school in Bursa. Then, he went to Istanbul to study in the military college and then the naval academy. After completing his education with honours, he was appointed teacher of mathematics at the naval academy, and later at Darüşşafaka High School, one of the most prominent schools in Istanbul. In 1879, together with one of his friends, he travelled to England for advanced studies. But the details of this period are not known. Probably, he also spent some time in Cyprus.

== Educator ==
After returning to Istanbul, he began teaching in private high schools, and in 1884 he established a high school of his own. It was a junior high school (Turkish: Rüştiye). Later, he added a senior high school section to his school (Turkish: İdadi). Although there were private junior high schools before 1884, he was the founder of the very first private senior high school in Istanbul. This school is now considered as the core of the modern Istanbul High School for Boys (Turkish: İstanbul Erkek Lisesi). He also added a section for the girls and a branch school in Edirne. Another novelty he introduced was the first school newspaper in Istanbul.

== Politics and later life ==
He secretly supported the Young Turks movement. But when Sultan Abdülhamit II arrested 350 Young Turk adherents on the charge of planning a coup in 1896, Mehmet Nadir was forced to resign. After working in a public school in Istanbul in 1903, he was appointed to Aleppo (now in Syria) as the director of education. In 1908, Young Turks came to power and he was exiled to Tripoli (now in Libya) by the Young Turks, who suspected of his betrayal back in 1896. After the Italo-Turkish War, in which Italians invaded Libya, he returned to Istanbul. Although he was also sent to Edirne, he soon returned to Istanbul during the Balkan Wars. After he convinced Young Turks of his innocence, he was appointed mathematics professor in the newly established Girls' University in Istanbul. In 1919 soon after the World War I, he began serving in the Darülfünun (present day, Istanbul University) as a müderris (professor) of mathematics in the newly established branch of Number theory.

He died on 27 December 1927.

== As a mathematician ==
Mehmet Nadir is considered as one of the first mathematicians of Turkey. He actively participated in a group of mathematicians of a French mathematics periodical named I’Intermediaire des Mathematiciens. According to Professor Erdal İnönü, a total of 62 papers of him were published in the periodical. One example cited by İnönü is as follows:

The whole number solution to the equation

$$x^2+y^2-z^2=u^5$$

proposed by Mehmet Nadir is

$$x=b\cdot(a^2+b^2)\cdot (a^2-b^2)$$
$$y=\frac{1}{2}\cdot((a^2-1)\cdot(a^2+b^2)^2-4\cdot b^2)$$
$$z=\frac{1}{2}\cdot((a^2+1)\cdot(a^2+b^2)^2+4\cdot b^2)$$
$$u=a^2+b^2$$

where b is a positive integer and a is a positive odd integer.

In 1917, Mehmet Nadir published a book on the Number theory. In this book, he proposed an alternative algorithm on divisibility. Well-known German mathematics professor Felix Klein congratulated him for the algorithm.
