= Kasım Gülek =

Turkish politician

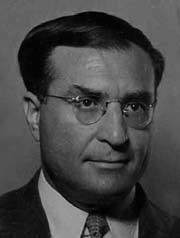

Turkish Minister of Transport
- In office 10 June 1948 – 16 January 1949
- President: İsmet İnönü
- Preceded by: Şükrü Koçak
- Succeeded by: Kemal Satır

Minister of Public Works of Turkey
- In office 10 September 1947 – 10 June 1948
- President: İsmet İnönü
- Preceded by: Cevdet Kerim İncedayı
- Succeeded by: Nihat Erim

Secretary General of the Republican People's Party
- In office 29 June 1950 – 28 September 1959
- Preceded by: Tevfik Fikret Sılay
- Succeeded by: İsmail Rüştü Aksal

Personal details
- Born: 1905 Adana, Ottoman Empire
- Died: January 19, 1996 (aged 91) Washington D. C., United States
- Children: Mustafa Gulek(Son), Tayyibe Gülek (Daughter)

Kasım Gülek (1905 – 1996) was a prominent Turkish statesman credited with being instrumental in entrenching democracy in Turkey by taking politics to the masses.

== Biography ==
He was born and lived in Adana, Adana Vilayet, Ottoman Empire, until he went away to school in Istanbul, where he studied respectively at Galatasaray High School and Robert College. He then went on to study at Ecole des Sciences Politiques in Paris, France, followed by Columbia University in New York City, New York, United States, where he received his PhD in Economics. After undertaking post doctorate studies at Cambridge in the United Kingdom and Berlin University as a fellow of the Rockefeller Foundation, he returned to his country upon request form the founder and president of the republic of Turkey, Mustafa Kemal Atatürk.

== Political career ==
After receiving a letter praising Kasım Gülek from the Dean of Columbia University, Atatürk, founder of modern Turkey, called upon him and offered him to become a Member of Parliament. Throughout his career, he held various ministerial positions including Minister of Public Works, Minister of Communications, Transport Minister, and Deputy Prime Minister.

He was a leading member of Atatürk's party, the Republican People's Party (CHP). Early in 1947 he was one of the leaders of group of thirty-five deputies who revolted in the party caucus urging reforms and liberalizations. The episode was called the "Rebellion of 35", but even though it was unsuccessful, Gülek and three other insurgents were still permitted to join the cabinet afterwards.

He is best remembered for his role as the Secretary General of the Republican People's Party from 1950 until 1959, a position to which he was elected seven consecutive times with an overwhelming majority of the vote. During his time as Secretary General, he resurrected the crushed CHP by travelling to the all corners of Turkey visiting almost every village in the country. He later served as a member of the Constituent Assembly and as a Senator from Adana.

He also held several international positions such as Chairman of the UN Commission on Korea, President of the North Atlantic Assembly, Governor of the Atlantic Institute, vice-president of NATO Parliamentarians Conference and vice-president of the Parliamentary Assembly of the Council of Europe.

He had 2 children, including Tayyibe Gülek.

Preceded by Hilmi Uran	Secretary general of the Republican People's Party; 1950 - 1959	Succeeded by İsmail Rüştü Aksal
