= Şemsettin Günaltay =

8th Prime Minister of the Republic of Turkey from 1949 to 1950

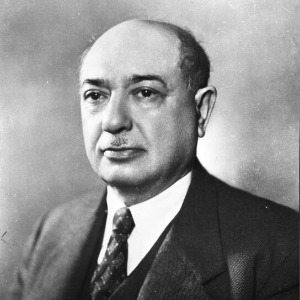

8th Prime Minister of Turkey
- In office 16 January 1949 – 22 May 1950
- President: İsmet İnönü
- Preceded by: Hasan Saka
- Succeeded by: Adnan Menderes

Member of the Grand National Assembly
- In office 14 May 1950 – 2 May 1954
- Constituency: Erzincan (1950)
- In office 28 June 1923 – 14 May 1950
- Constituency: Sivas (1923, 1927, 1931, 1935, 1939, 1943, 1946)

Personal details
- Born: 17 July 1883 Kemaliye, Ottoman Empire
- Died: 19 October 1961 (aged 78) Istanbul, Turkey
- Party: Republican People's Party
- Education: Vefa High School; University of Lausanne

Mehmet Şemsettin Günaltay (Turkish pronunciation: [ʃemseˈtin ɟynaɫˈtaj]; 17 July 1883 – 19 October 1961) was a Turkish historian, politician, and Prime Minister of Turkey from 1949 to 1950.

== Biography ==
Günaltay was born 1883 in the Kemaliye town of the Vilayet of Mamuret-ul-Aziz, Ottoman Empire. He was a graduate of Vefa High School, Istanbul. After finishing the Teacher's College, he was educated in physics at the University of Lausanne in Switzerland.

After his return to Turkey, Günaltay worked as a teacher in a number of high schools. During this time, he got to know Ziya Gökalp, a prominent ideologue of Pan-Turkism. Influenced by him, he began to carry out research on Turkish history. In 1914, he was appointed professor of the history of Turks and Islamic tribes at the Faculty of Letters of Istanbul University. The same year began to publish articles in the journal, İslam Mecmuası, which was sponsored by the Committee of Union and Progress. Later, he served as the dean of the Faculty of Theology at the same university.

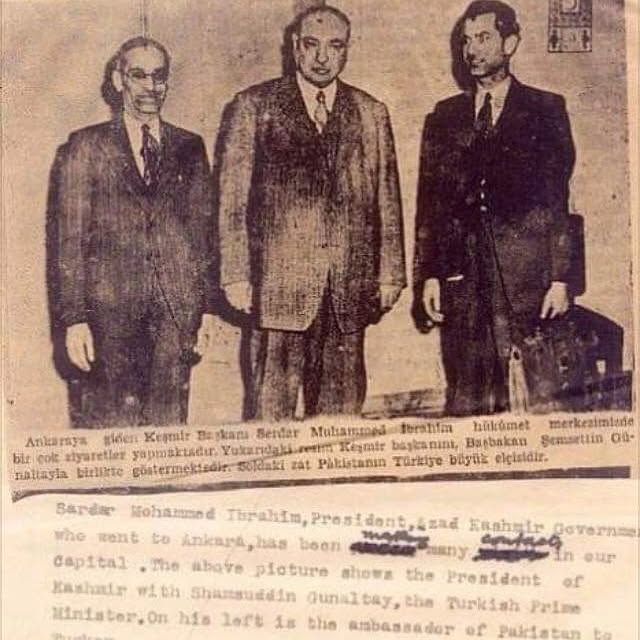
Sardar Muhammad Ibrahim Khan's visit to Ankara. Standing next to Turkish PM Şemsettin Günaltay.

== Political career ==
In 1915, Günaltay was elected to the Ottoman Parliament as deputy of Bilecik Province from the Committee of Union and Progress, and remained a member of the parliament until its dissolution. In the meantime, he continued to lecture at the university.

During the Turkish War of Independence, Günaltay joined the "Association of Defense of the Rights of Anatolia and Rumelia". After the foundation of the Republic of Turkey in 1923, he entered Turkish Grand National Assembly as deputy of Sivas Province from the Republican People's Party (Turkish: Cumhuriyet Halk Partisi, CHP), serving for 27 years until 1950. Between 1950 and 1954, he represented Erzincan Province in the parliament.

After Prime Minister Hasan Saka's resignation, Günaltay was appointed by President İsmet İnönü to form his cabinet on 16 January 1949 that lasted until Adnan Menderes's Democratic Party took over the government on 22 May 1950, following the general elections. He was the last prime minister of the single party era in the politics of Turkey. He was a scholar of Islam and reopened the faculty of Divinity at the Ankara University, after its Faculty of Divinity was closed in 1933.

Günaltay died on 19 October 1961 in Istanbul due to prostate cancer, shortly after he was elected to the Senate to represent Istanbul Province (but before he could take his seat). He was laid to rest next to his daughter's grave in Ankara in accordance with his will.

Günaltay was also the head of the Turkish Historical Society from 1941 until his death.

== Bibliography ==
- Zulmetten Nura (From Darkness to Light)
- Hurafattan Hakikata (From Superstition to Reality)
- İslam Dini Tarihi (History of the Religion of Islam)
- Maziden Atiye (From the Past to the Future)
- Mufassal Türk Tarihi (Detailed Turkish History)
- Tarih, (History)

Political offices
Preceded by Hasan Saka	Prime Minister of Turkey; 16 January 1949 – 22 May 1950	Succeeded by Adnan Menderes
