= 1950 Turkish general election =

- 14 May 1950

487 seats in the Grand National Assembly 244 seats needed for a majority
- Turnout: 89.3%
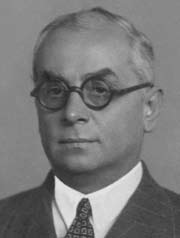

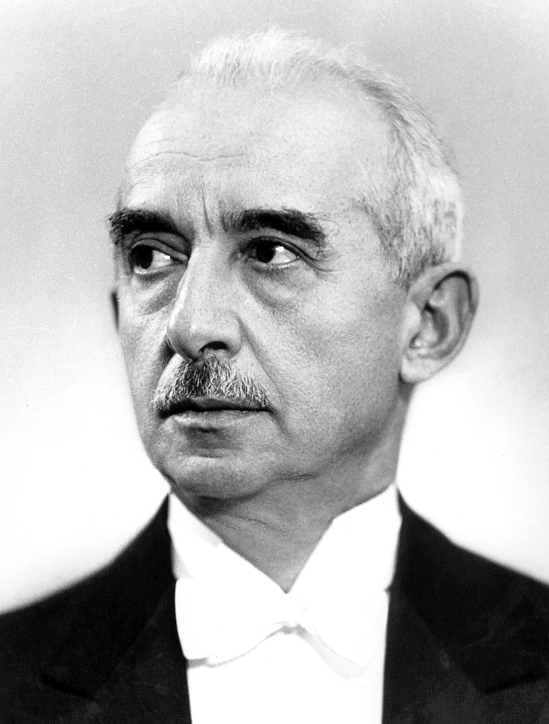
	First party	Second party
Leader	Celâl Bayar	İsmet İnönü
Party	DP	CHP
Last election	64	395
Seats won	416	69
Seat change	▲352	▼326
Popular vote	4,391,694	3,148,626
Percentage	55.22%	39.59%
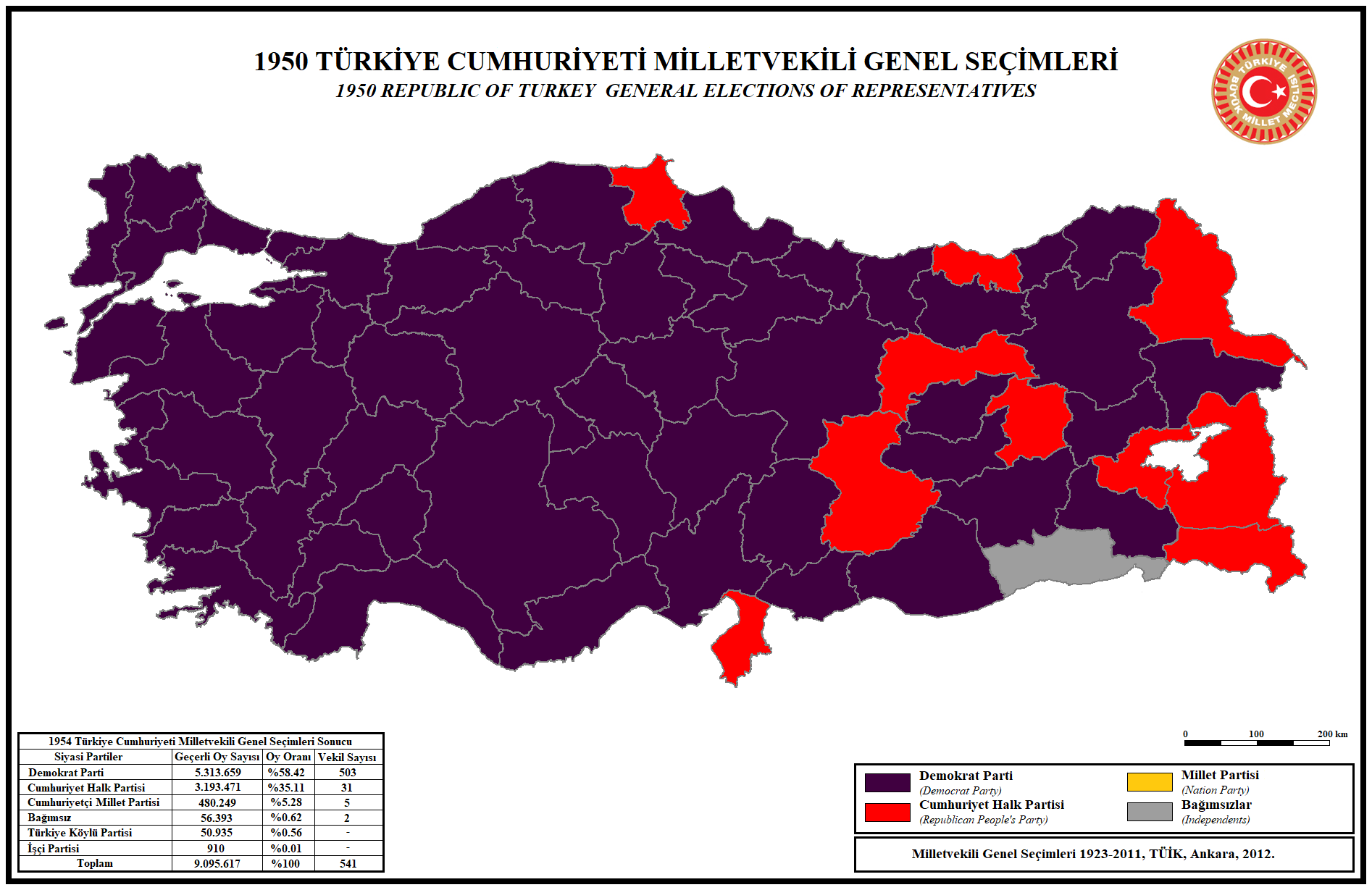
Prime Minister before election
Şemsettin Günaltay
CHP
Elected Prime Minister
Adnan Menderes
DP

General elections were held in Turkey on 14 May 1950, using the multiple non-transferable vote electoral system. The result was a landslide victory for the opposition Democrat Party (DP), which won 416 of the 487 seats with 55% of the vote.

Unlike the previous elections in 1946, the 1950 elections took place in a calm atmosphere. The results meant that Republican People's Party (CHP) was ousted from power for the first time since the foundation of the republic. Due to the electoral system designed to boost the dominant party's parliamentary numbers, the Democrat Party won 85% of the seats with only 55% of the popular vote. The CHP won 14% of the seats despite receiving nearly 40% of the popular vote.

== Results ==
Party	Votes	%	Seats	+/–
Democrat Party	4,391,694	55.22	416	+352
Republican People's Party	3,148,626	39.59	69	–326
Nation Party	368,537	4.63	1	New
Independents	44,537	0.56	1	–5
Total	7,953,394	100.00	487	+22
Total votes	7,953,394	–		
Registered voters/turnout	8,905,743	89.31		
Source: YSK

== Aftermath ==
On 22 May Celal Bayar was elected president. On the same day, the first DP government headed by the Prime Minister Adnan Menderes was formed. Bayar stepped down as leader of the DP and was replaced by Menderes.
