= Erzurum =

- Metropolitan municipality
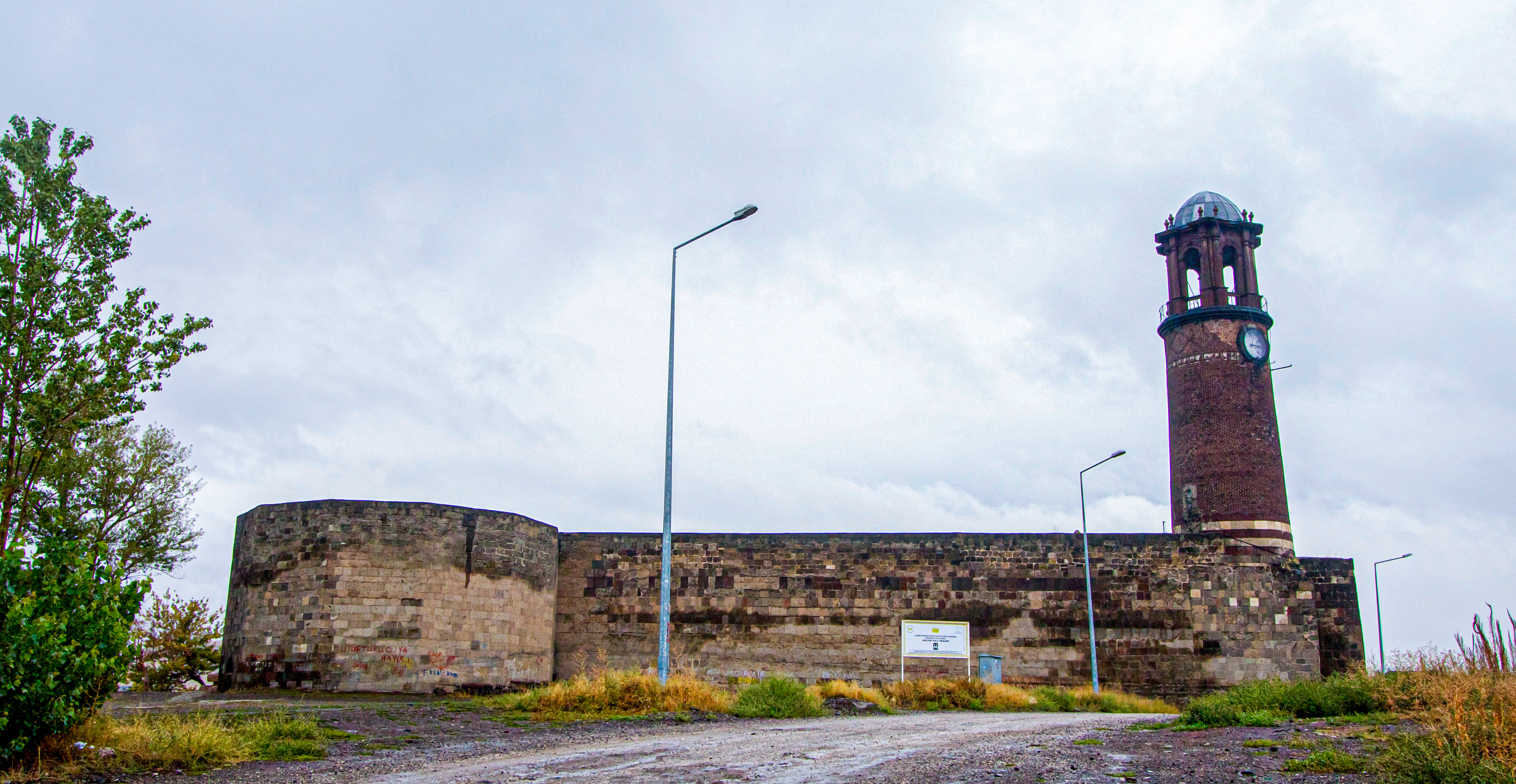
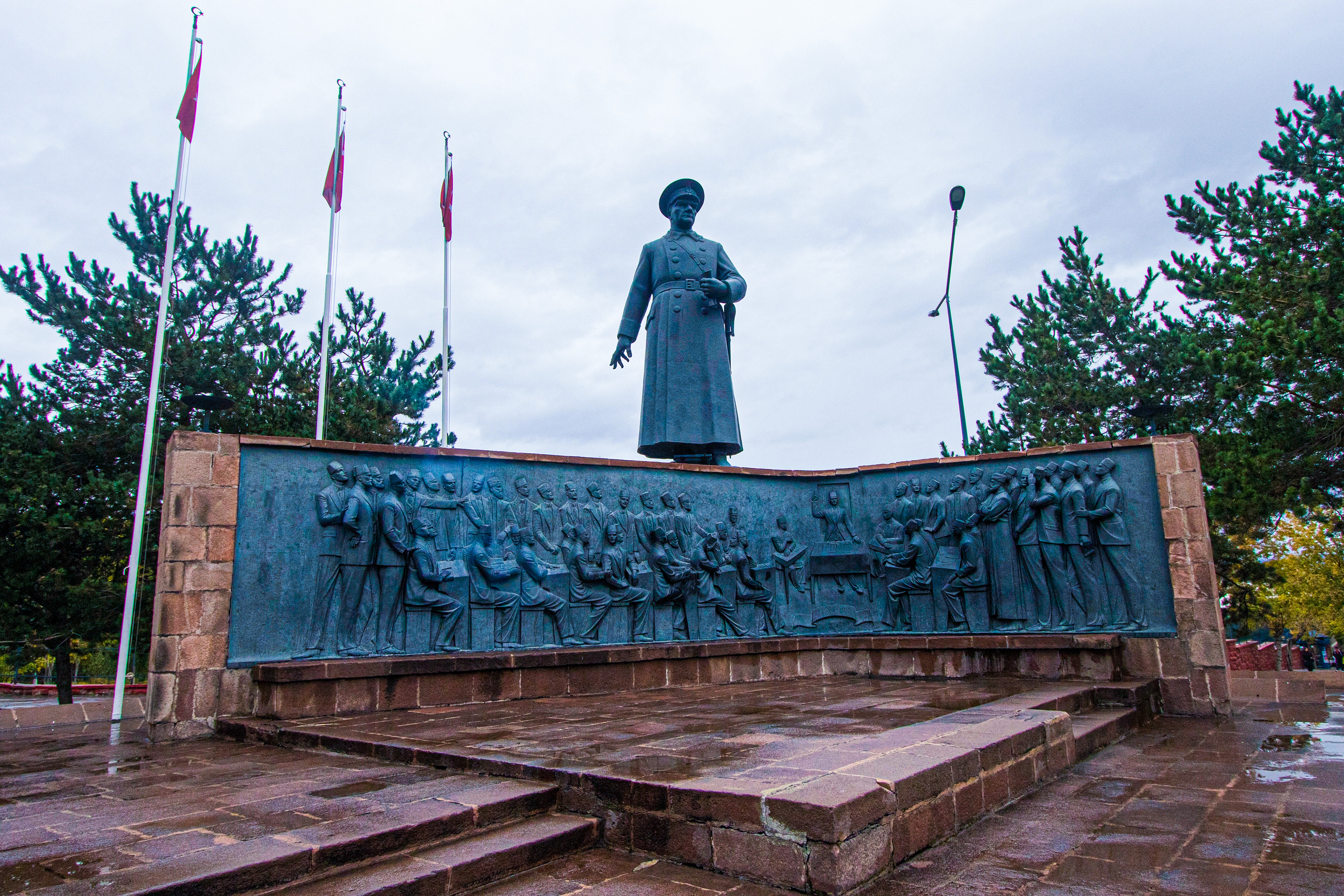
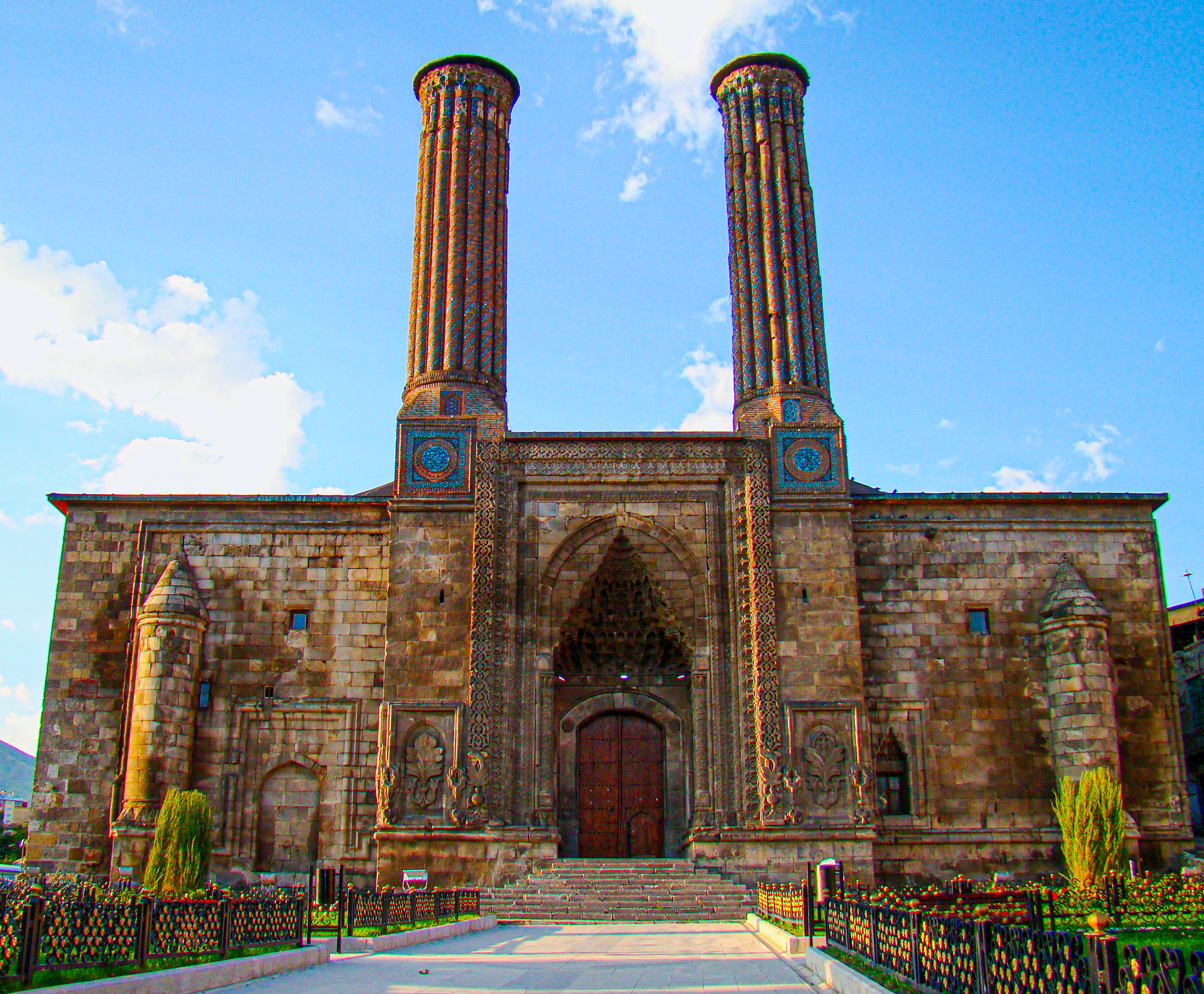
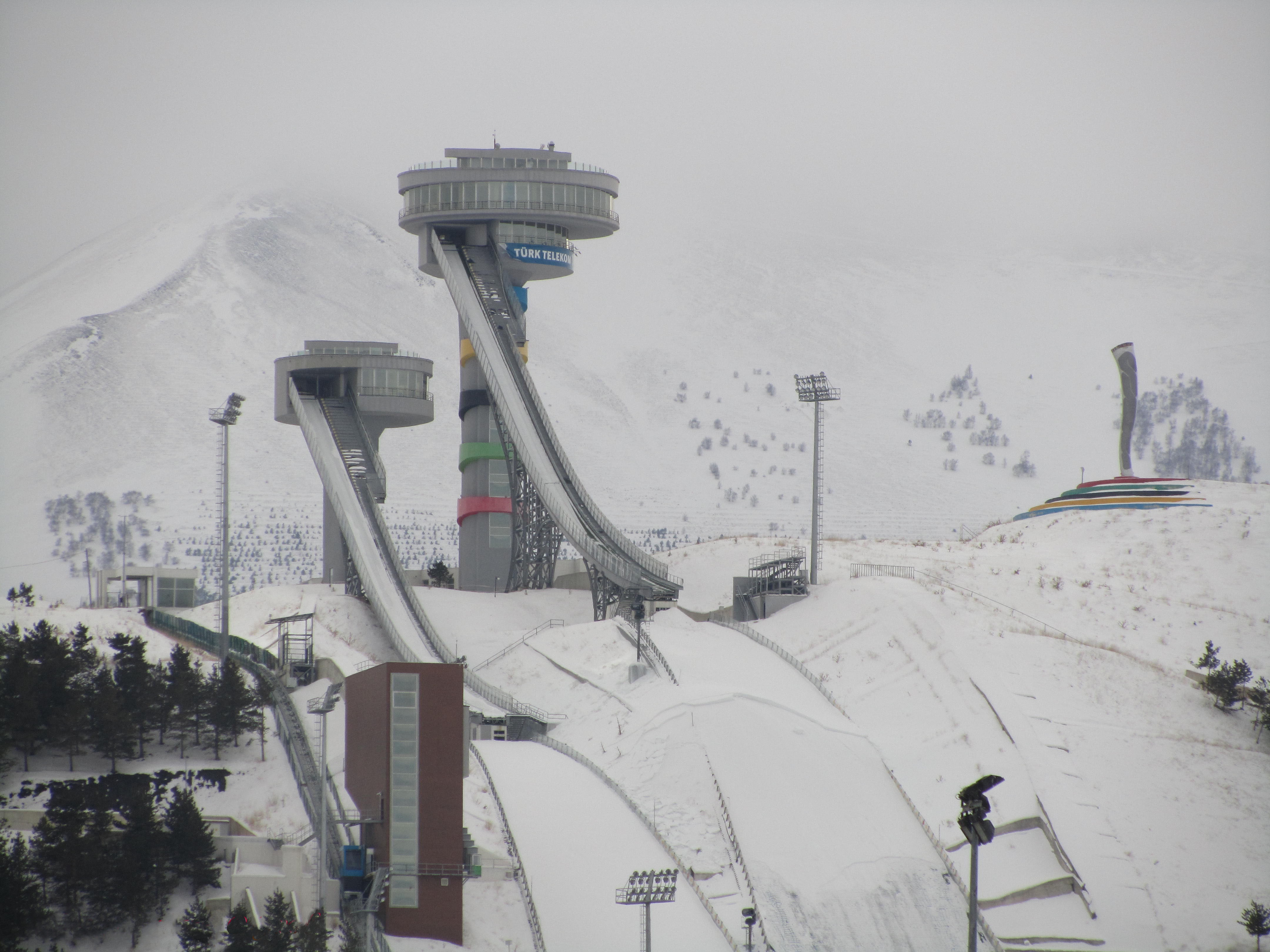
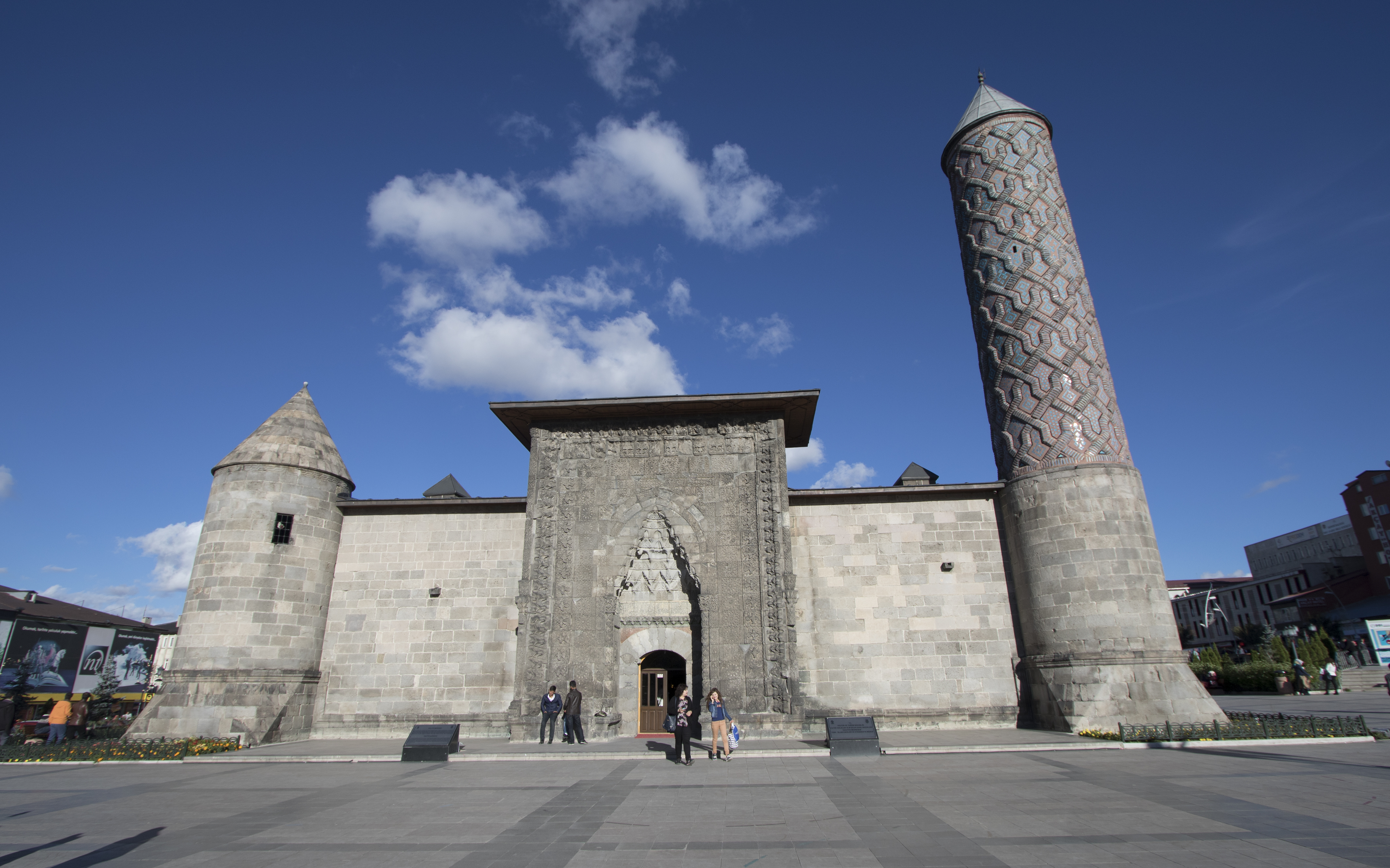
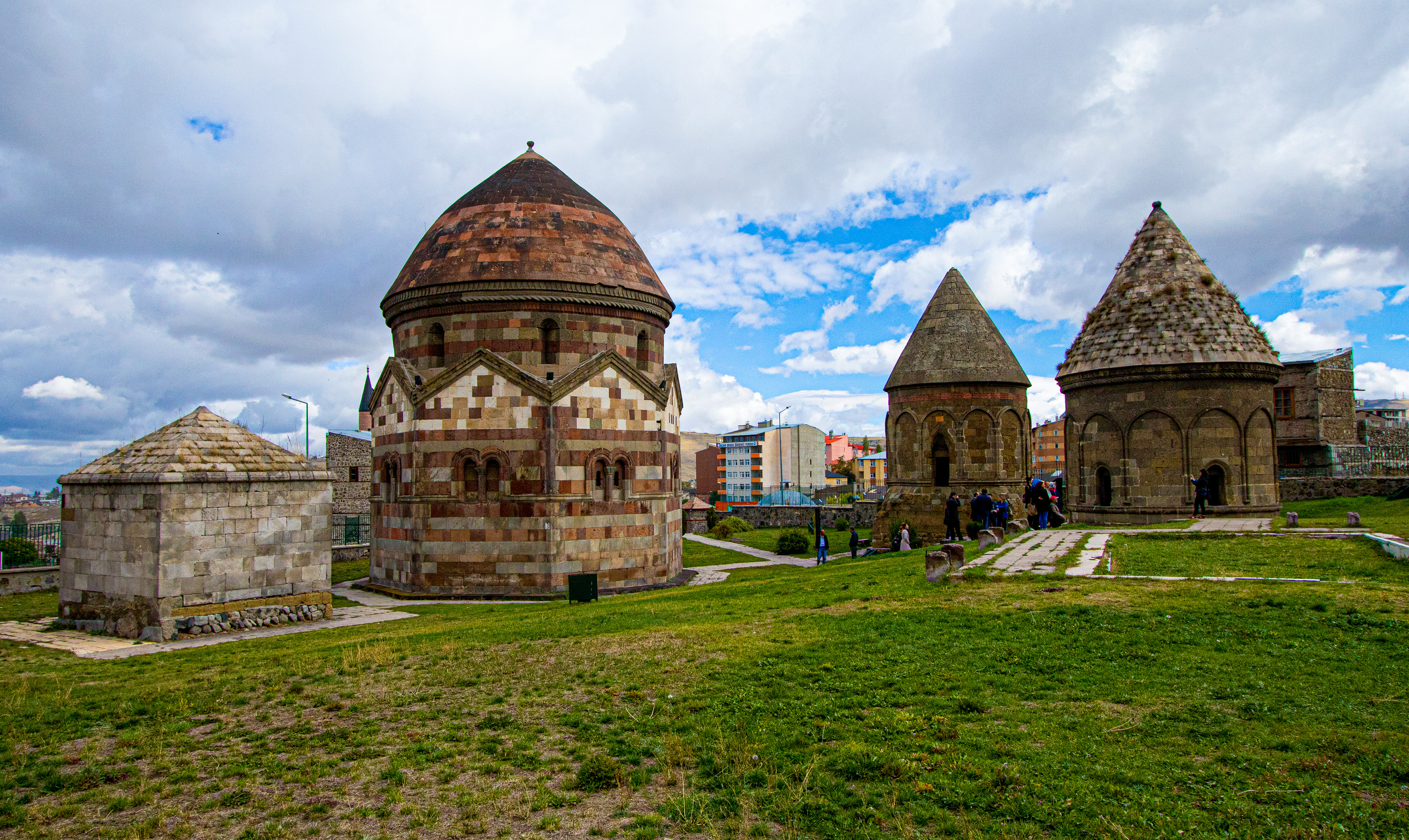
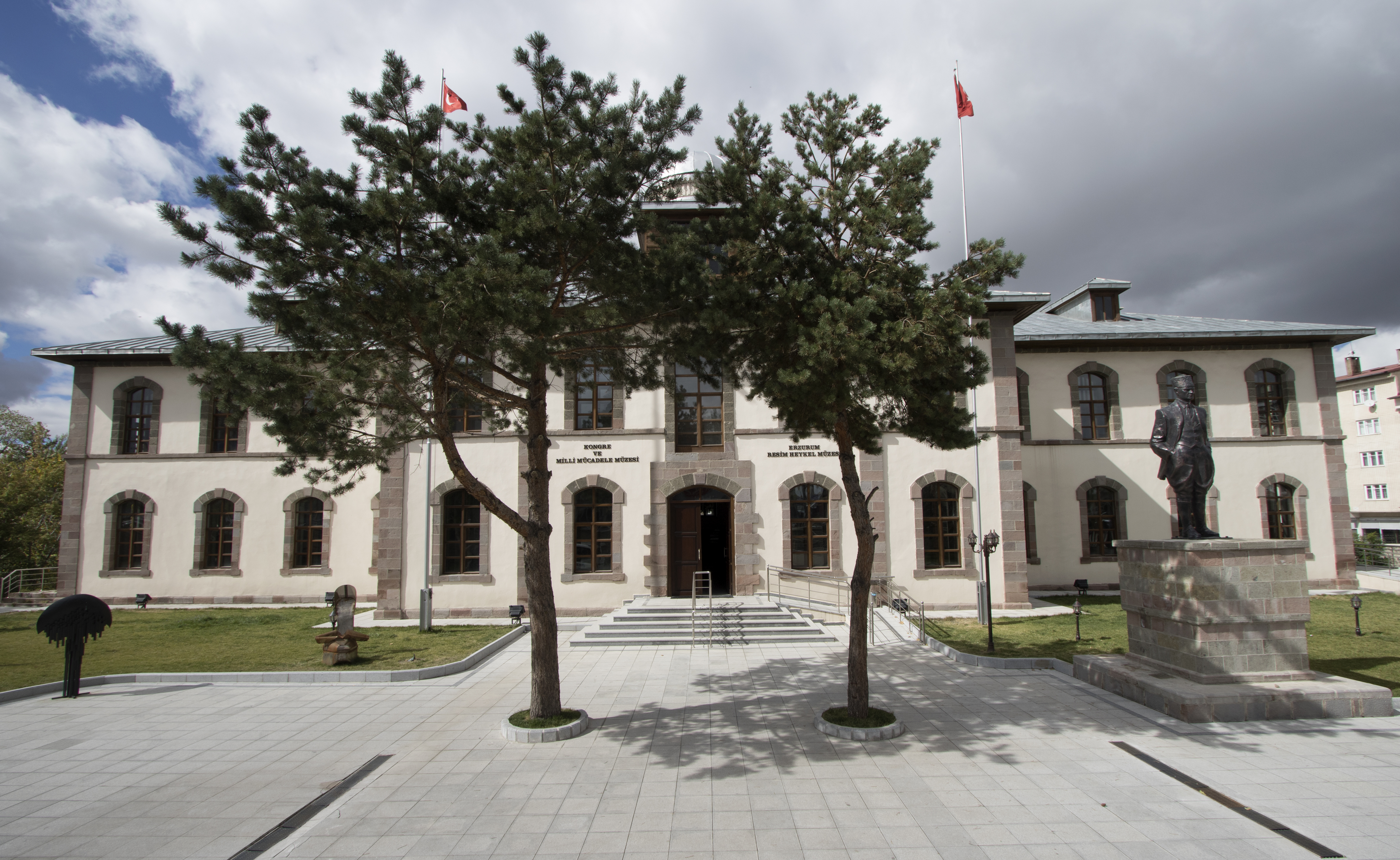
- Clockwise from top: Erzurum Citadel, Çifte Minareli Medrese, Yakutiye Medresesi, Erzurum Congress Museum, The Three Kümbets (Üç Kümbetler), K-95 and K-125 ski jumping towers at the Mt. Palandöken ski resort, Atatürk Monument

- Emblem of Erzurum Metropolitan Municipality

- Location of Erzurum
- Coordinates: 39°54′31″N 41°16′37″E
- Country: Turkey
- Province: Erzurum Province

Government
  - Mayor: Mehmet Sekmen (AKP)
- Elevation: 1,890 m (6,200 ft)

Population (2021)
  - Urban: 767,848
- Time zone: UTC+3 (TRT)
- Climate: Dfb
- Website: www.erzurum.bel.tr

Erzurum (Armenian: Կարին, romanized: Karin; Kurdish: Erzîrom) is a city in eastern Turkey. It is the largest city and capital of Erzurum Province and is 1,900 meters (6,233 feet) above sea level. Erzurum had a population of 367,250 in 2010. It is the site of ancient Theodosiopolis.

The city uses the double-headed eagle as its coat-of-arms, a motif that has been a common symbol throughout Anatolia since the Bronze Age.

Erzurum has winter sports facilities, hosted the 2011 Winter Universiade, and the 2023 Winter Deaflympics (in March 2024).

== Name and etymology ==
The city was originally known in Armenian as Karno K'aghak' (Armenian: Կարնոյ քաղաք), meaning city of Karin, to distinguish it from the district of Karin (Կարին). It is presumed its name was derived from a local tribe called the Karenitis. An alternate theory contends that a local princely family, the Kamsarakans, the Armenian off-shoot of the Iranian Kārin Pahlav family, lent its name to the locale that eventually became the city.

During Roman times, Erzurum was named Theodosiopolis (Latin: Theodosiopolis, Greek: Θεοδοσιούπολις). On the Tabula Peutingeriana it is called Autisparate. After the Arab conquest of Armenia in the seventh century, the city was known to the Arabs as Kālīkalā (adopted from the original Armenian name Karno K'aghak').

It received its present name after its conquest by the Seljuk Turks following the Battle of Manzikert in 1071. In 1048/49, a neighboring commercial city named Artze (Arcn, Arzan; Armenian: Արծն) was heavily sacked by the Seljuks. Its Armenian, Assyrian, and other Christian inhabitants moved to Theodosiopolis, which they began calling Artsn Rum (meaning 'Artze of the Rûm', i.e., Romans) to distinguish it from their former residence.

Some older sources derive the name Erzurum from the Arabic Arḍu ar-Rūm (Arabic: ارض الروم) 'land of the Rûm'.

During the brief period it came under Georgian rule, the city was known as Karnu-kalaki (Georgian: კარნუ-ქალაქი).

The following variants of the name also occur: Erzerum, Arzrum.

== History ==
=== Early history ===
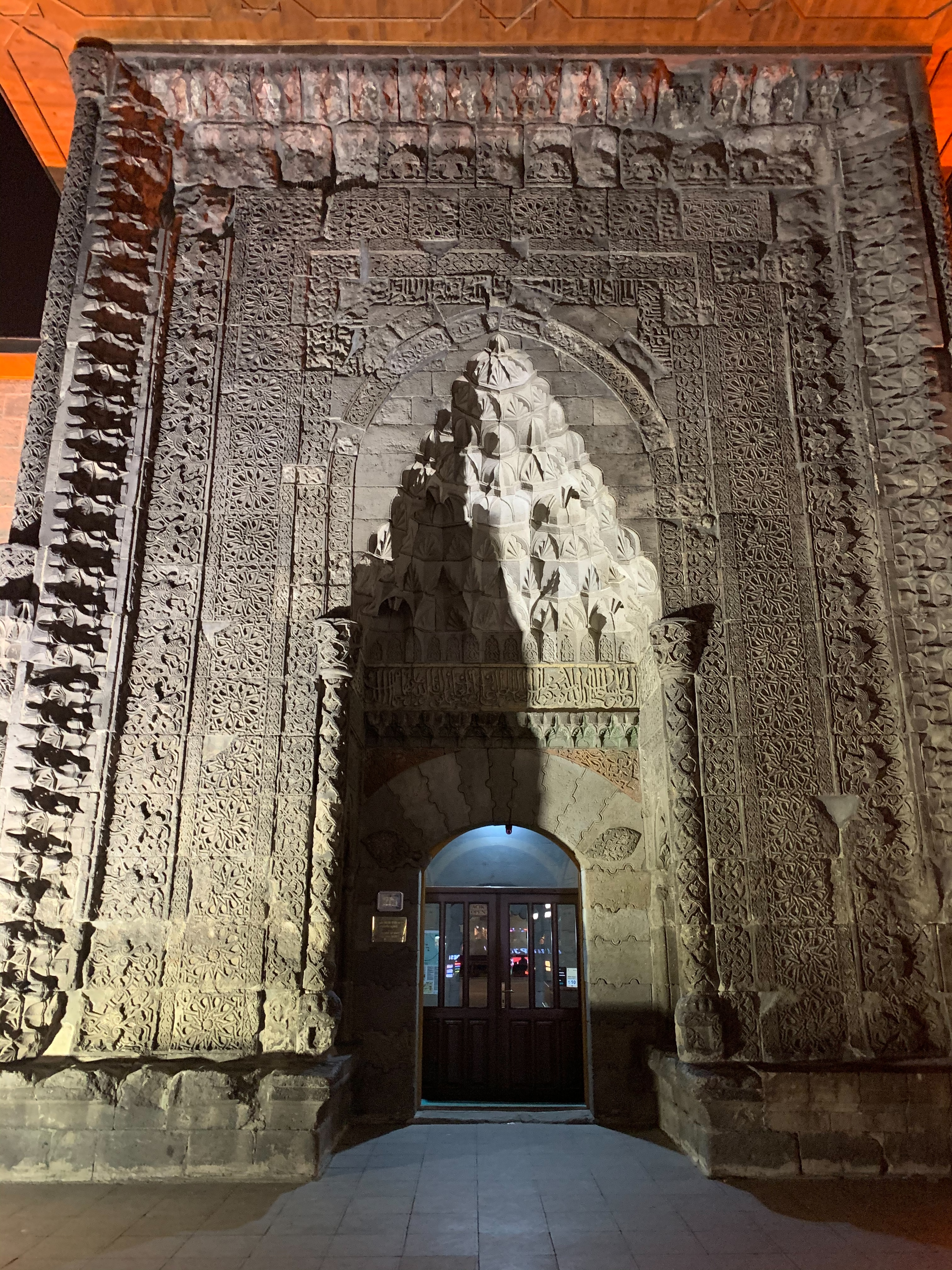
Yakutiye Medresesi in the city center

The surroundings of Erzurum at the Urartian period presumably belonged to Diauehi.

Later, Erzurum existed under the Armenian name of Karin. During the reigns of the Artaxiad and Arsacid kings of Armenia, Karin served as the capital of the eponymous canton of Karin, in the province Bardzr Hayk' (Upper Armenia). After the partition of Armenia between the Eastern Roman Empire and Sassanid Persia in 387 AD, the city passed into the hands of the Romans who fortified the city and renamed it Theodosiopolis, after Emperor Theodosius I.

As the chief military stronghold along the eastern border of the empire, Theodosiopolis held a highly important strategic location and was fiercely contested in wars between the Byzantines and Persians. Emperors Anastasius I and Justinian I both refortified the city and built new defenses during their reigns.

=== Middle Ages ===
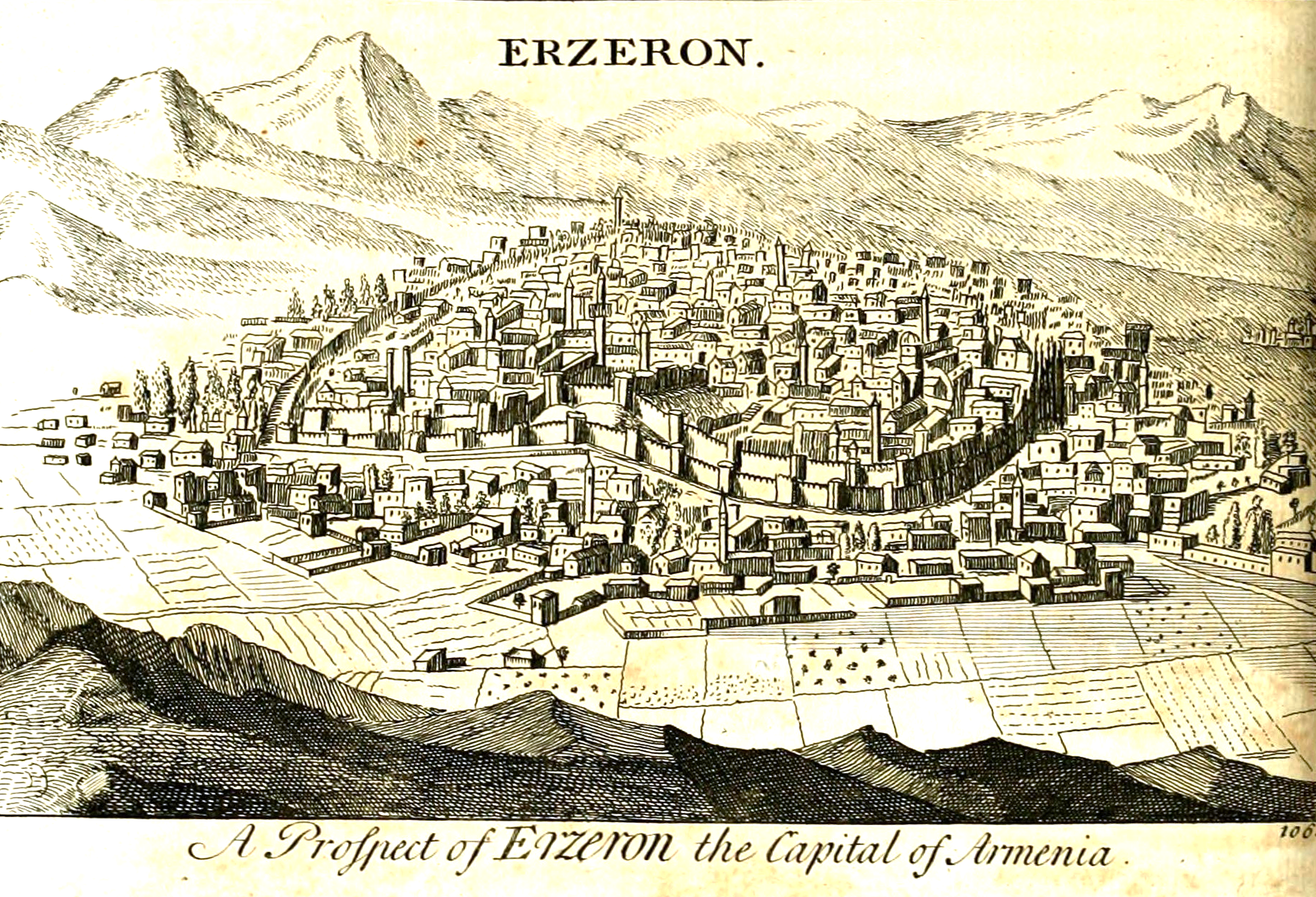
"A Prospect of Erzeron the Capital of Armenia" from Joseph Pitton de Tournefort's 1717 book Relation d'un voyage du Levant

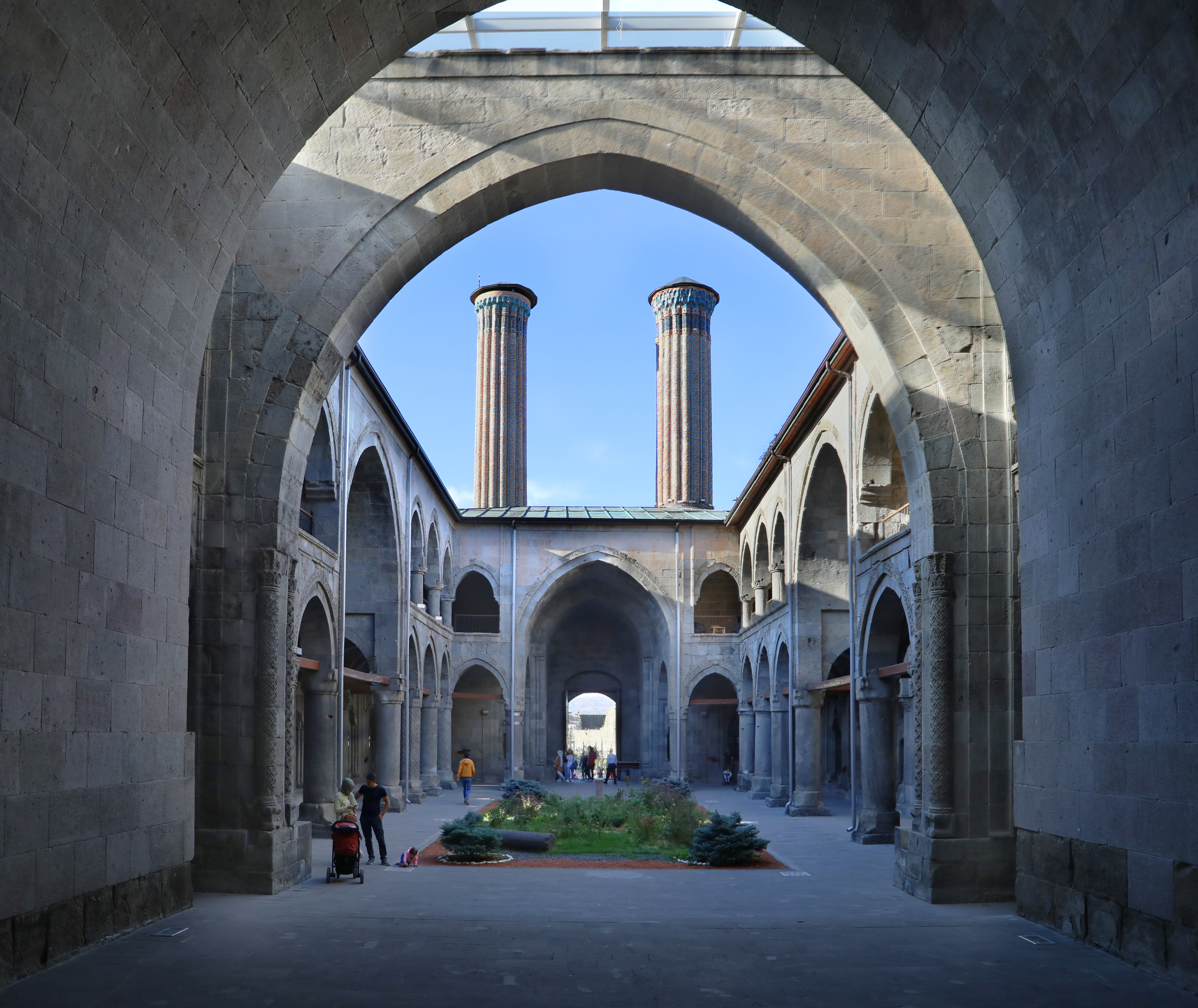
The Seljuk era Çifte Minareli Medrese (Twin Minaret Madrasa) is the symbol of the city and appears on its coat of arms.

Theodosiopolis was conquered by the Umayyad general Abdallah ibn Abd al-Malik in 700/701. It became the capital of the emirate of Ḳālīḳalā and was used as a base for raids into Byzantine territory. Though only an island of Arab power within Christian Armenian-populated territory, the native population was generally a reliable client of the Caliph's governors. As the power of the Caliphate declined, and the resurgence of Byzantium began, the local Armenian leaders preferred the city to be under the control of powerless Muslim emirs rather than powerful Byzantine emperors.

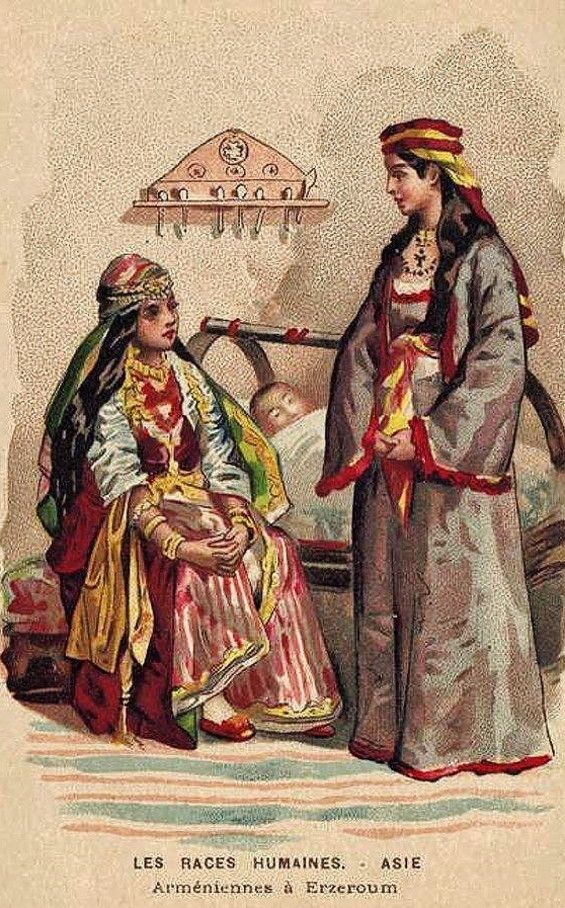
Image from Alexandre Lacauchie’s book on the traditional costumes of every nation. Pictures two Armenian women from Erzurum in their traditional attire. circa 1847

In 931, and again in 949, Byzantine forces led by Theophilos Kourkouas, grandfather of the future emperor John I Tzimiskes, captured Theodosiopolis. Its Arab population was expelled and the city was resettled by Greeks and Armenians. Emperor Basil II rebuilt the city and its defenses in 1018 with the help of the local Armenian population. In 1071, after the decisive battle at Manzikert, the Seljuk Turks took possession of Theodosiopolis. The Saltukids were rulers of an Anatolian beylik (principality) centered in Erzurum, who ruled from 1071 to 1202. Melike Mama Hatun, sister of Nâsırüddin Muhammed, was the ruler between 1191 and 1200.

Theodosiopolis repelled many attacks and military campaigns by the Seljuks and Georgians (the latter knew the city as Karnu-Kalaki) until 1201 when the city and the province was conquered by the Seljuk sultan Süleymanshah II. Erzen-Erzurum fell to the Mongol siege in 1242, and the city was looted and devastated. After the fall of the Sultanate of Rum in early 14th century, it became an administrative province of the Ilkhanate, and later on the city was under Empire of Trebizond occupation for a while around the 1310s. Then became part of the Timurid Empire, the Çoban beylik, Black Sheep Turkmen, and White Sheep Turkmen. It subsequently passed to Safavid Persia, until the Ottomans under Selim I in 1514 conquered it through the Battle of Chaldiran. During Ottoman imperial rule, the city served as the main base of military power in the region.

It served as the capital of the eyalet of Erzurum. Early in the seventeenth century, the province was threatened by Safavid Persia and a revolt by the province governor Abaza Mehmed Pasha. This revolt was combined with Jelali Revolts (the uprising of the provincial musketeers called the Jelali), backed by Iran and lasted until 1628. In 1733, Iranian ruler Nader Shah took Erzurum during the Ottoman–Persian War (1730–35), but the city returned to Ottoman possession following his death in 1747.

=== Modern history ===
In 1821, during the last major Ottoman-Persian War, the Ottomans were decisively defeated at Erzurum by the Iranian Qajars at the Battle of Erzurum (1821). In 1829 the city was captured by the Russian Empire, but was returned to the Ottoman Empire under the Treaty of Adrianople (Edirne), in September of the same year. During the Crimean War Russian forces approached Erzurum, but did not attack it because of insufficient forces and the continuing Russian siege of Kars. The city was unsuccessfully attacked (Battle of Erzurum (1877)) by a Russian army in the Russo-Ottoman War of 1877–78. However, in February 1878, the Russians took Erzurum without resistance, but it was again returned to the Ottoman Empire, this time under the Treaty of San Stefano. There were massacres of the city's Armenian citizens during the Hamidian massacres (1894–1896).

==== World War I and Turkish War of independence ====
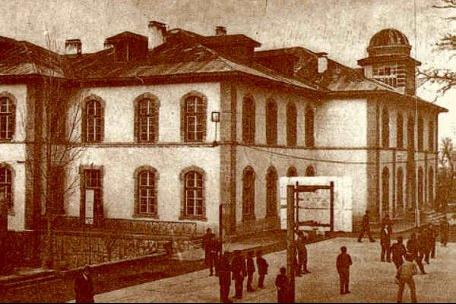
Sanasarian College was one of the premier Armenian educational institutions in Erzurum on the eve of the First World War. Its faculty was murdered during the 1915 genocide.

The 40,000-strong Armenian population was deported from the city and killed en masse during the 1915 Armenian genocide. Their cultural institutions, including churches, clubs, and schools, were looted, destroyed, or otherwise left derelict. When Russian forces occupied Erzurum in 1916, there were scarcely 200 Armenians left alive.

The city was also the location of one of the key battles in the Caucasus Campaign of World War I between the armies of the Ottoman and Russian Empires. This resulted in the capture of Erzurum by Russian forces under the command of Grand Duke Nicholas and Nikolai Nikolaevich Yudenich on February 16, 1916. Erzurum reverted to Ottoman control after the signing of the Treaty of Brest-Litovsk in March 1918. In 1919, Mustafa Kemal Atatürk, one of the key founders of the modern Turkish Republic, resigned from the Ottoman army in Erzurum and was declared an "Honorary Native" and freeman of the city, which issued him his first citizenship registration and certificate (Nüfus Cuzdanı) of the new Turkish Republic. The Erzurum Congress of 1919 was one of the starting points of the Turkish War of Independence.

==== Inspectorate General ====
In September 1935, Erzurum was made the seat of the newly created third Inspectorate General (Umumi Müfettişlik, UM). The third UM span over the provinces of Erzurum, Artvin, Rize, Trabzon, Kars Gümüşhane, Erzincan and Ağrı. It was governed by an Inspector General. The Inspectorate General was dissolved in 1952 during the Government of the Democrat Party.

== Ecclesiastical history ==
Theodosiopolis was important enough in the Late Roman province of Armenia Tertia to become a bishopric, which the Annuario Pontificio lists as suffragan of the Archdiocese of Comachus, but in Notitiae Episcopatuum from the seventh and early tenth centuries, its (later?) Metropolitan is the Archdiocese of Caesarea in Cappadocia. In either case, it was in the sway of the Patriarchate of Constantinople.

Its historically recorded Suffragan Bishops were :

- Petrus I, intervening at the council of 448 convoked by Patriarch Flavian of Constantinople in his see to condemn Archimandrite Eutyches as a heretic for his extreme opposition to Nestorianism
- Manasse intervened at the Council of Chalcedon in 451
- Petrus II participated in the 533 dispute in Constantinople between 'orthodoxy' and Monophysitism
- As ancient Theodosiopolis in Armenia (or "in Cappadocia"), the former bishopric remains a Latin Catholic titular see.

=== Council of Theodosiopolis (593) ===
After the long Byzantine-Sasanian War of 572-591, Byzantine rule was extended to all western parts of Armenia, and emperor Maurice (582-602) decided to strengthen political control over the region by supporting pro-Chalcedonian fraction of the Armenian Church. In 593, regional council of western Armenian bishops met in Theodosiopolis, proclaimed allegiance to the Chalcedonian Definition and elected John of Bagaran as new Catholicos of Chalcedonian Armenians.

As Ancient Theodosiopolis in Armenia (or "in Cappadocia"), the former bishopric remains a Latin Catholic titular see, renamed as Titular Archiepiscopal See of Aprus. Its post is vacant since 1968, Antonio Gregorio Vuccino was its last archbishop.

== Demographics ==
In 1829, Erzurum had 130,000 inhabitants, including 30,000 Armenians. In 1909, there were 60,000 inhabitants, including 15,000 Armenians (2,500 families). Armenians mainly lived in the northern and northwestern districts of the city. On the eve of the First World War, 37,480 Armenians lived in the kaza of Erzurum, with 43 churches, three monasteries and 52 schools. All but about 200 Armenians were executed during the Armenian genocide.

Today, the city has a Lom population.

== Economy ==
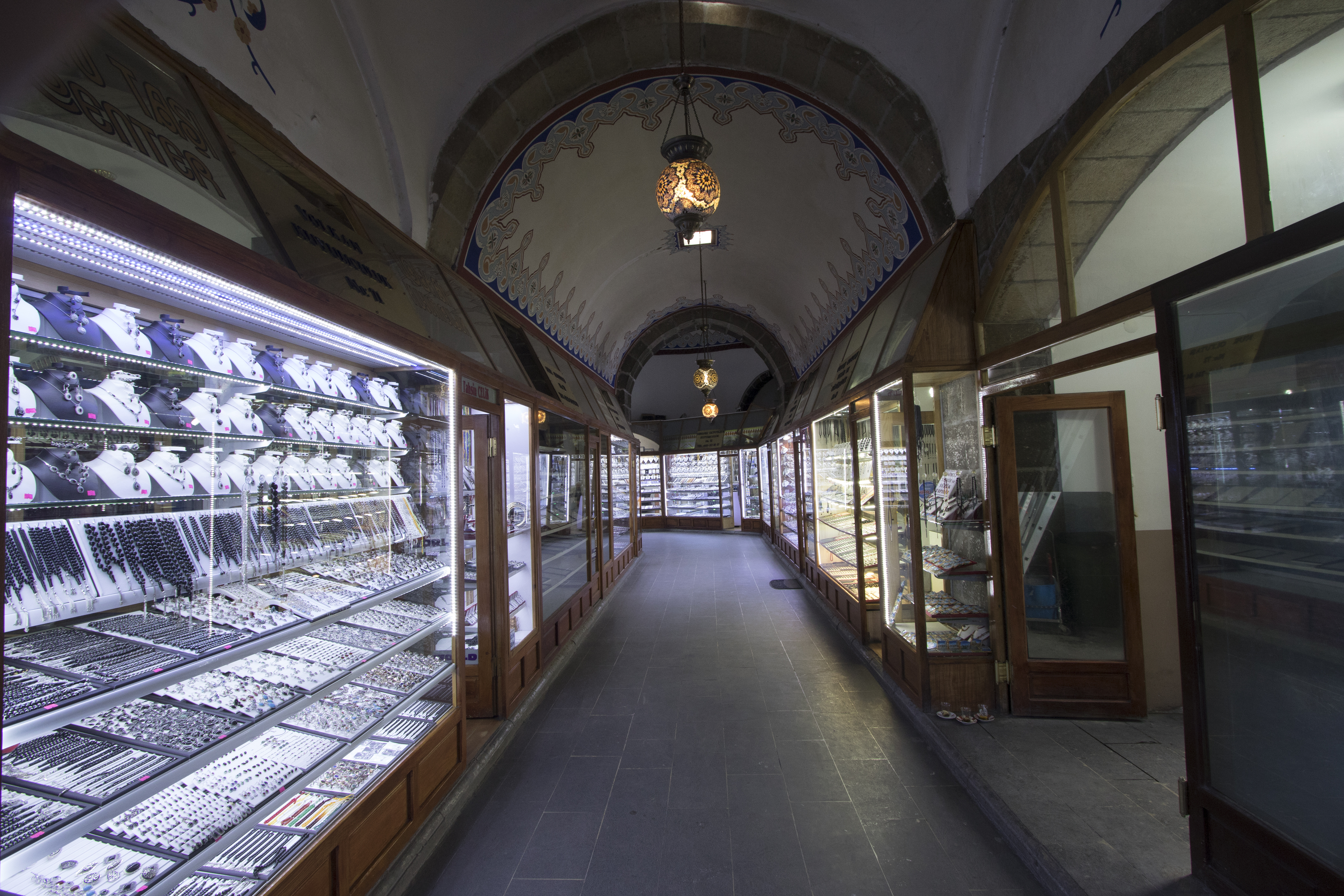
Jewelry shops in Taşhan

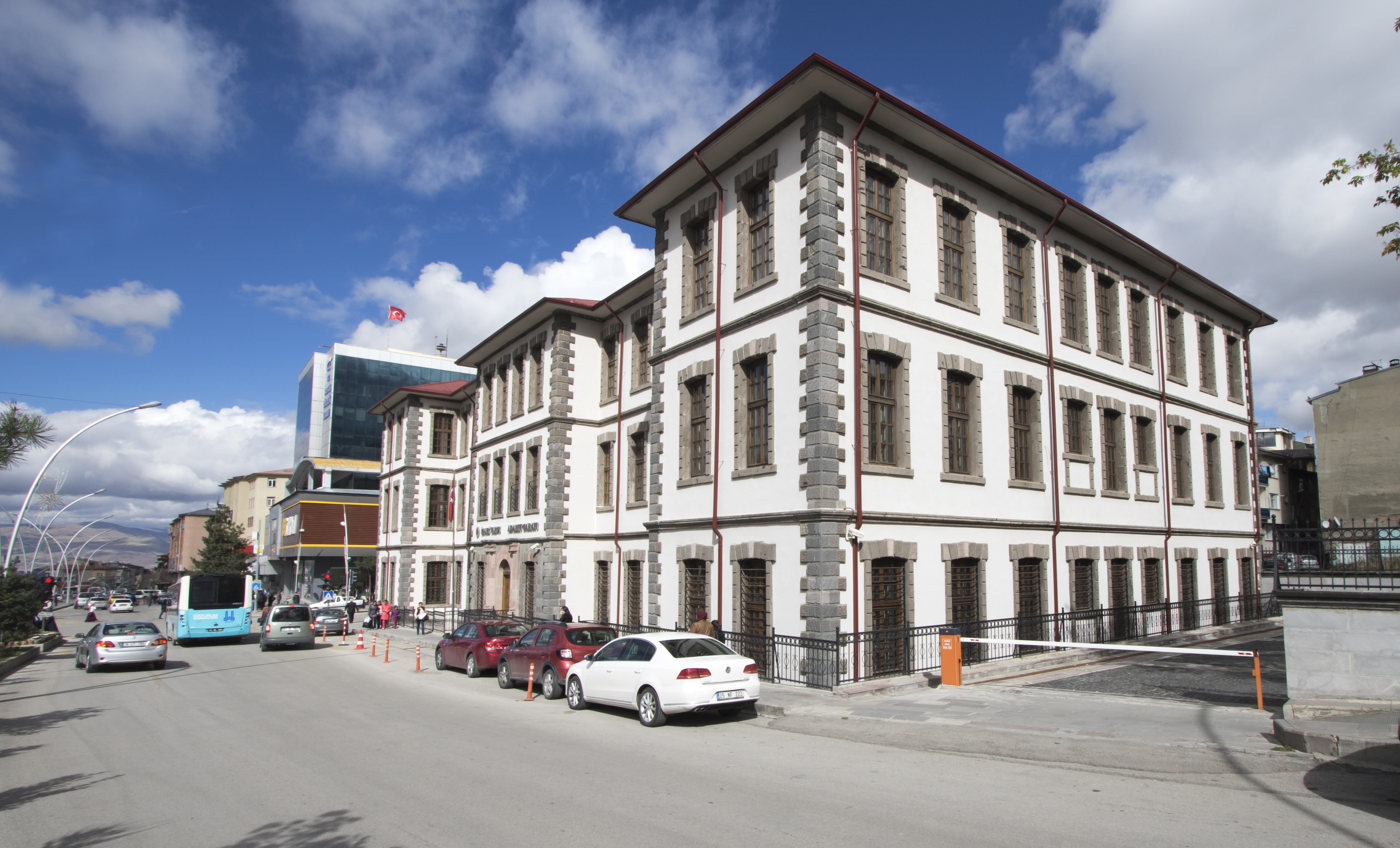
Erzurum Administrative Justice Palace

One of the largest source of income and economic activity in the city has been Atatürk University. Established in 1950, it is one of the largest universities in Turkey, having more than forty-thousand students. Tourism also provides a portion of the province's revenues. The city is a popular destination in Turkey for winter sports at the nearby Palandöken Mountain.

Erzurum is notable for the small-scale production of objects crafted from Oltu stone: most are sold as souvenirs and include prayer beads, bracelets, necklaces, brooches, earrings and hairclips.

For now, Erzurum is the ending point of the South Caucasus Pipeline, also called the Baku-Tbilisi-Erzurum (BTE) pipeline. Erzurum will also be the starting point of the planned Nabucco pipeline which will carry natural gas from the Caspian Sea basin to the European Union member states. The intergovernmental agreement between Turkey, Romania, Bulgaria, Hungary and Austria to build the Nabucco pipeline was signed by five Prime Ministers on 13 July 2009 in Ankara. The European Union was represented at the ceremony by the President of the European Commission Jose Manuel Barroso and the Commissioner for Energy Andris Piebalgs, while the United States was represented by the Special Envoy for Eurasian Energy Richard Morningstar and the Ranking Member of the United States Senate Committee on Foreign Relations Senator Richard Lugar.

== Tourism ==
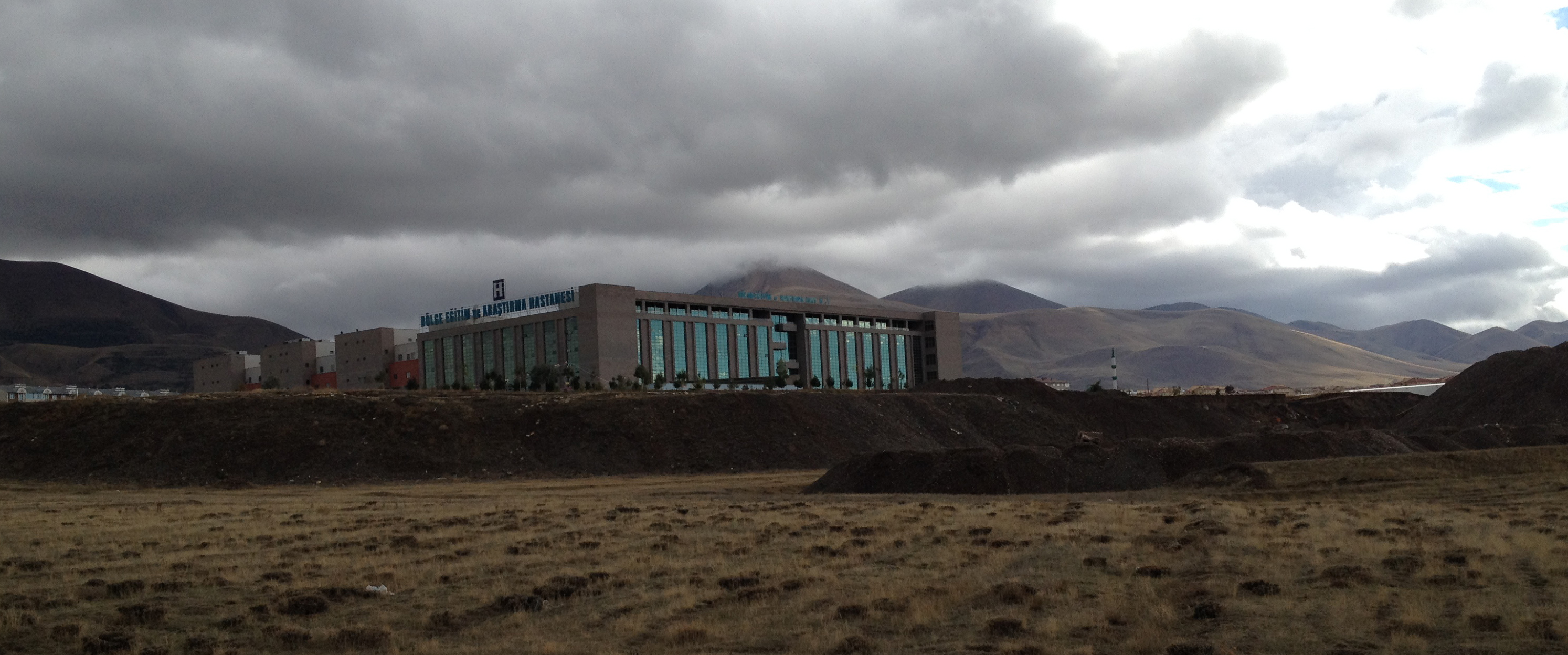
Erzurum Regional Research Hospital

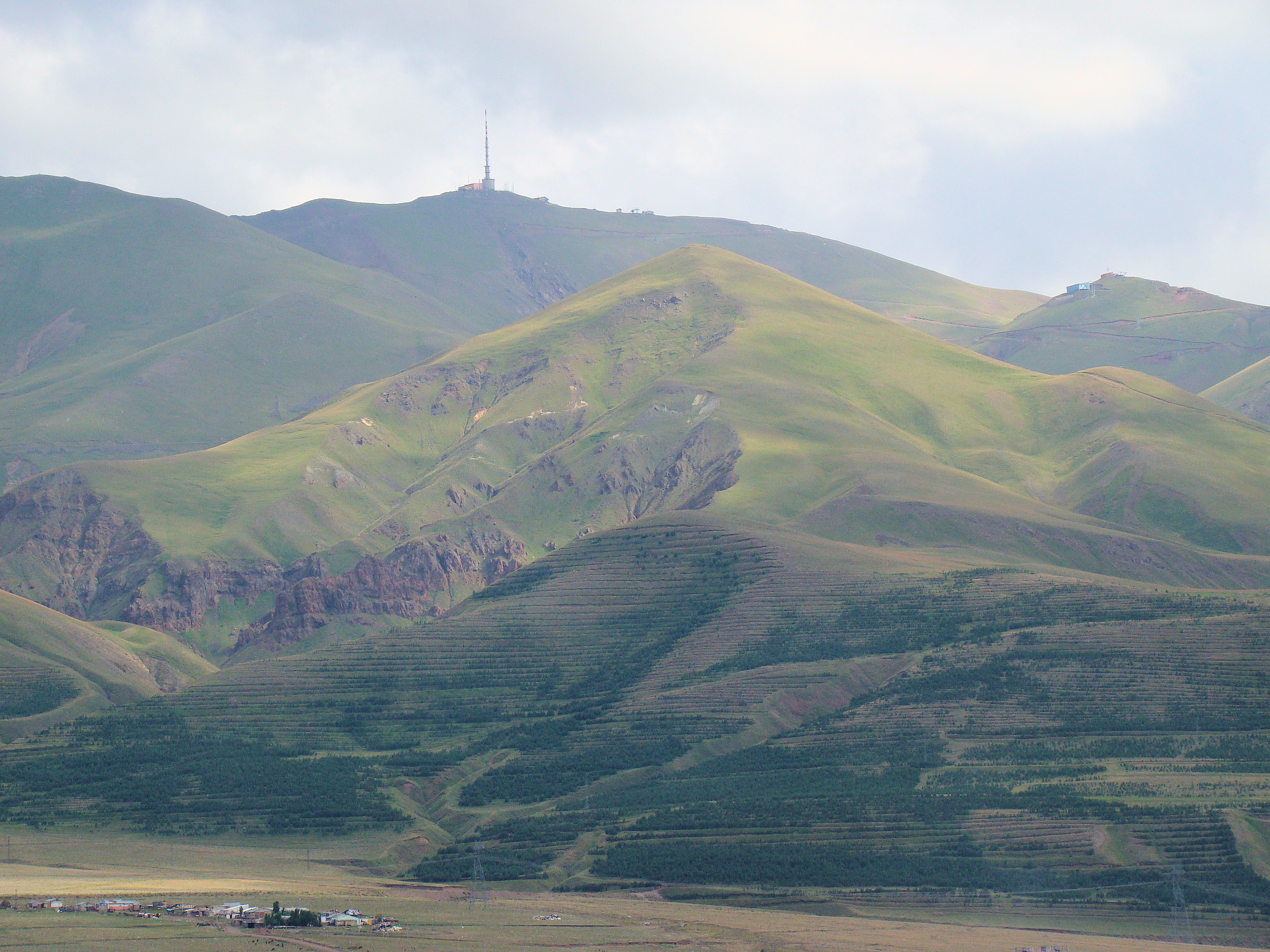
Palandöken in August 2009, as seen from downtown Erzurum.

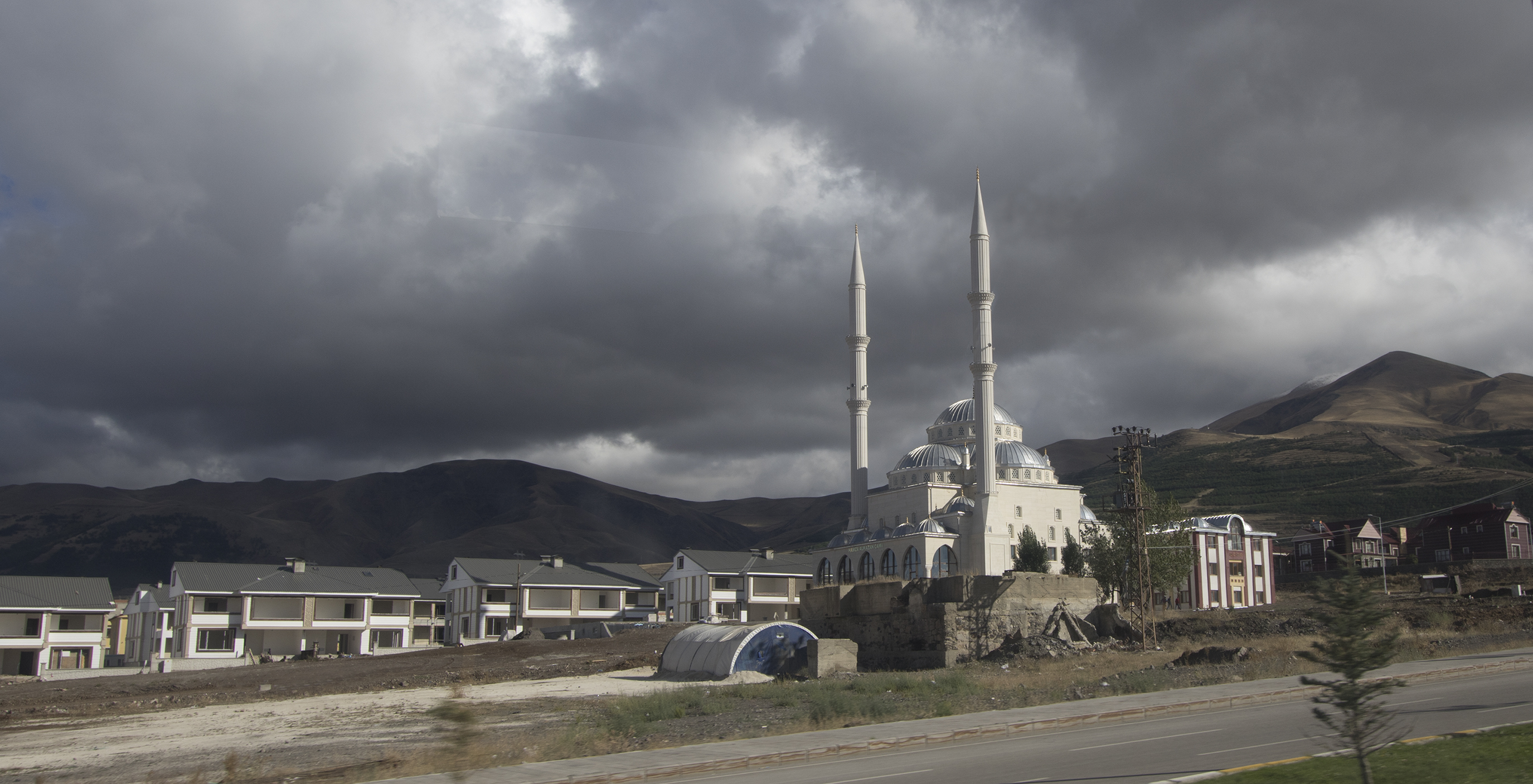
A mosque view in Erzurum.

Little of medieval Erzurum survives beyond scattered individual buildings such as the citadel fortress, and the 13th century Çifte Minareli Medrese (the "Twin Minaret" madrasa). Visitors may also wish to visit the Çobandede Bridge, which dates back to late 13th century, the Lala Mustafa Pasha Mosque and the Grand Mosque.

== Culture ==
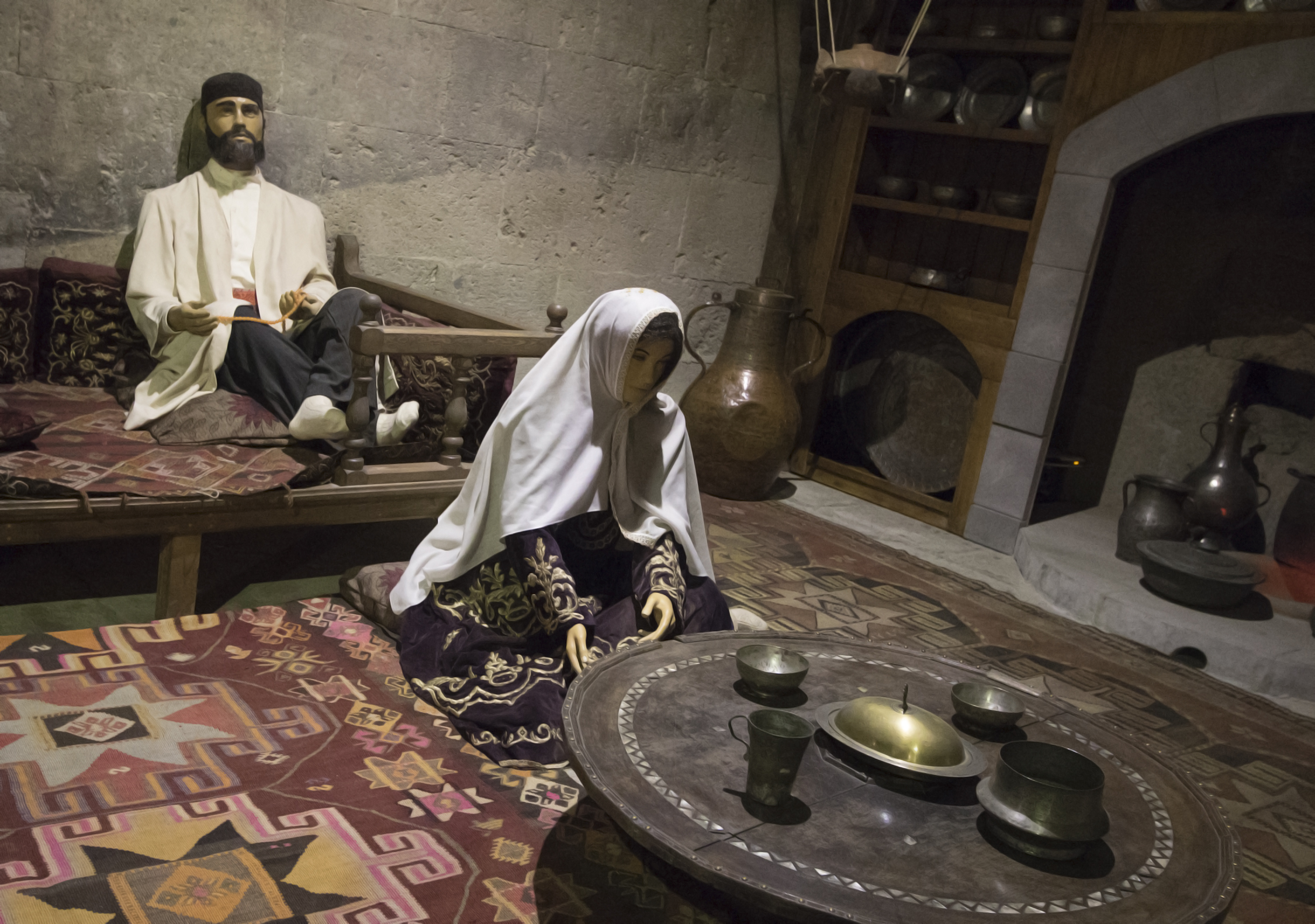
A waxwork illustrating a man and a woman in traditional costumes, Yakutiye Medresesi, Erzurum.

=== Cuisine ===
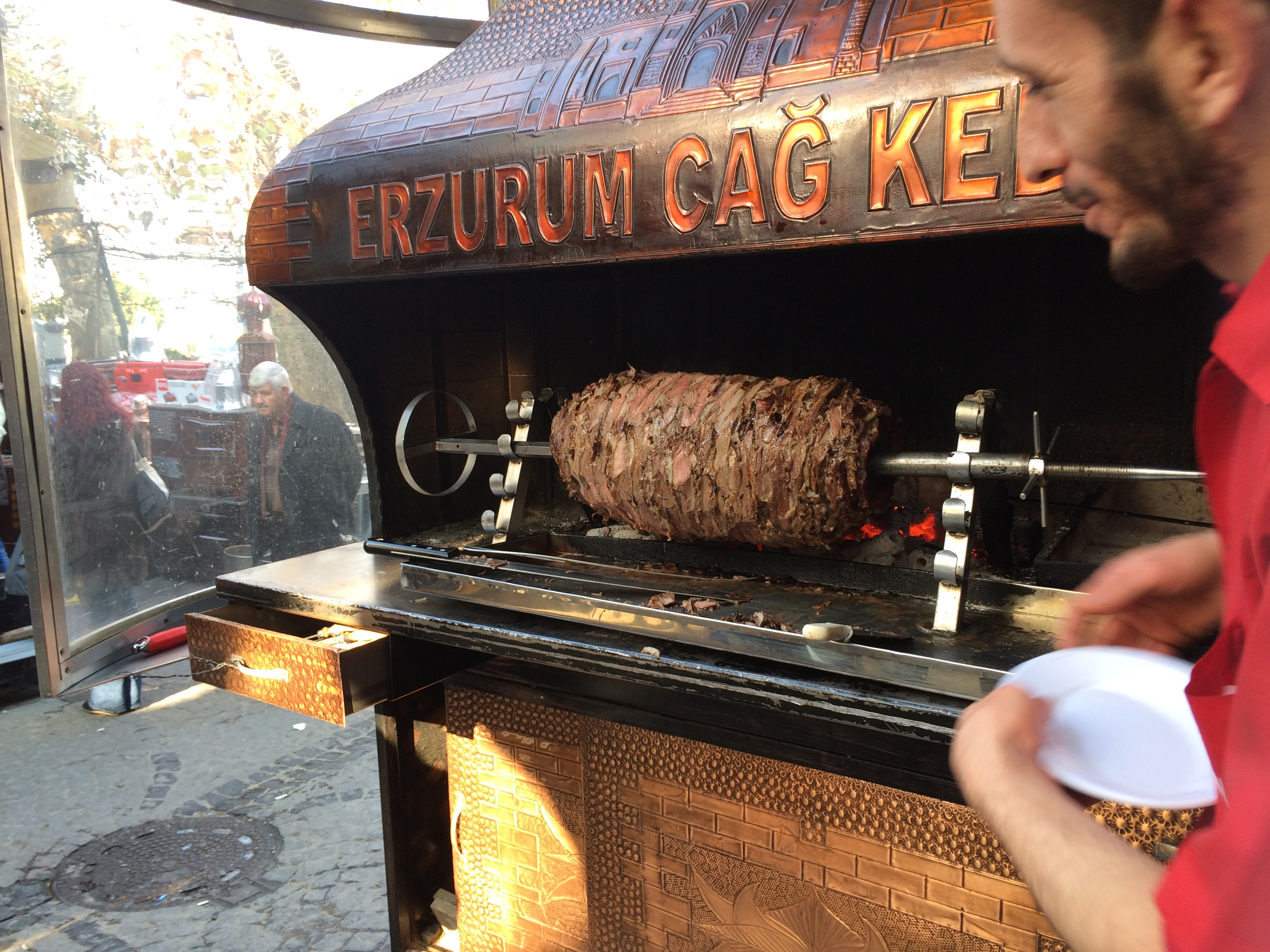
Cağ Kebab of Erzurum.

One specialty of Erzurum's cuisine is Cağ Kebab. Although this kebab variety is of recent introduction outside its native region, it is rapidly attaining widespread popularity around Turkey.

Kadayıf dolması is a dessert made with shreds of kadayif dough wrapped around crushed walnuts.

Other regional food items include su böreği (wet pastry), ekşili dolma (sour stuffed vegetables), kesme çorbası (soup), ayran aşı yayla çorbası (nomads soup), çiriş, şalgam dolması (stuffed turnip), blue chechil and yumurta pilavı (egg pilaf).

Erzurum additionally has a unique tea tradition. "Kıtlama" refers to a traditional sugar that is consumed by drinking tea with the sugar cube in one's mouth to let the sweetener slowly dissolve. Many people in Erzurum also prefer to drink their tea with a slice of lemon, as it is believed the lemon soaks up impurities and improves digestion.

== Education ==
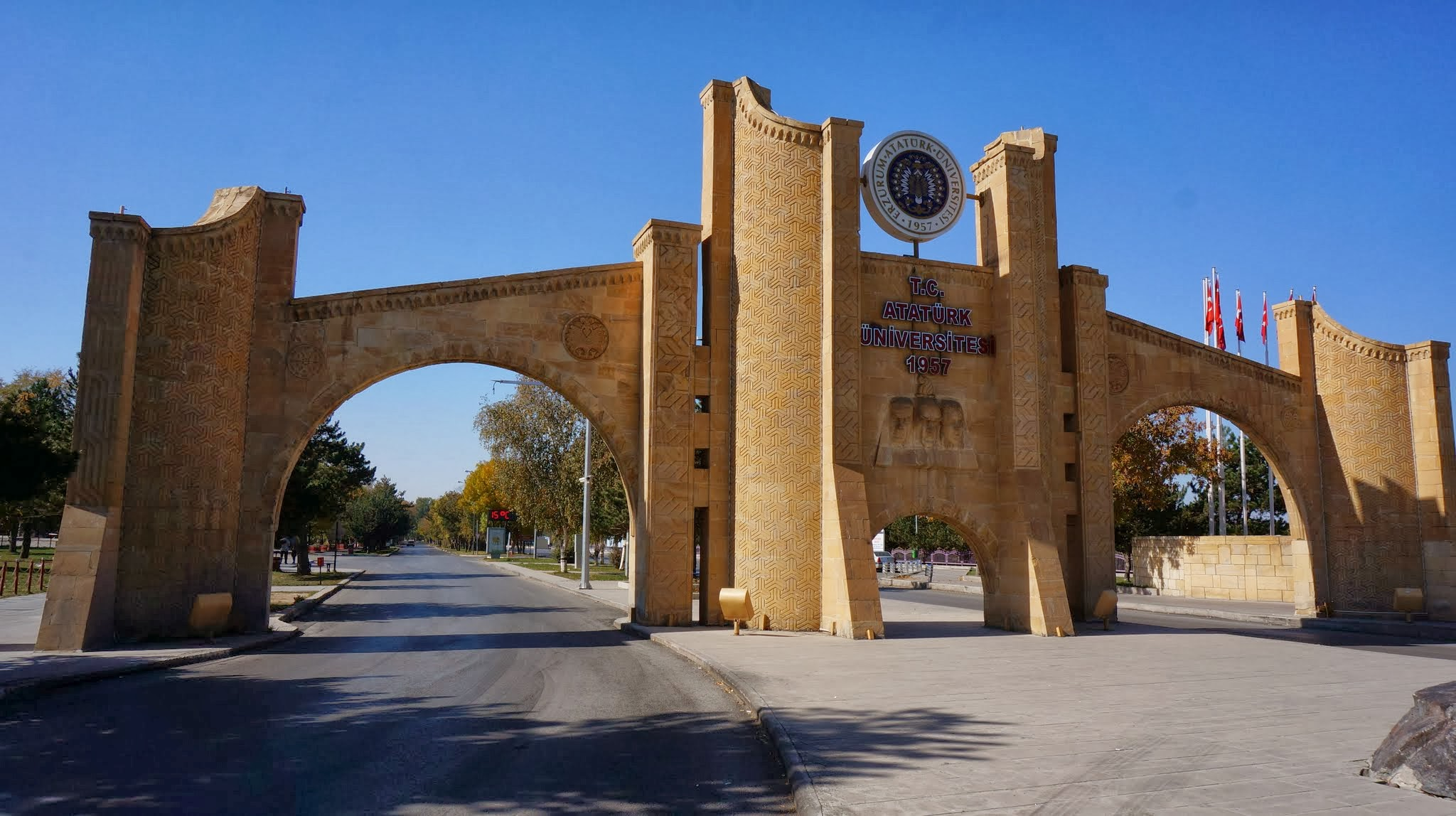
Atatürk University in Erzurum

Erzurum Technical University and Atatürk University are located in Erzurum. Nearly 10% of the city's population are university students, ranking it the city in Turkey with the 10th highest proportion of higher education students.

Sanasarian College was an Armenian-language educational institution formerly located in Erzurum. It is now converted to the Erzurum Congress building.

Bilkent Erzurum is a private international high school in the Palandöken district of Erzurum. It follows the IB curriculum.

== Sports ==
=== Venues ===
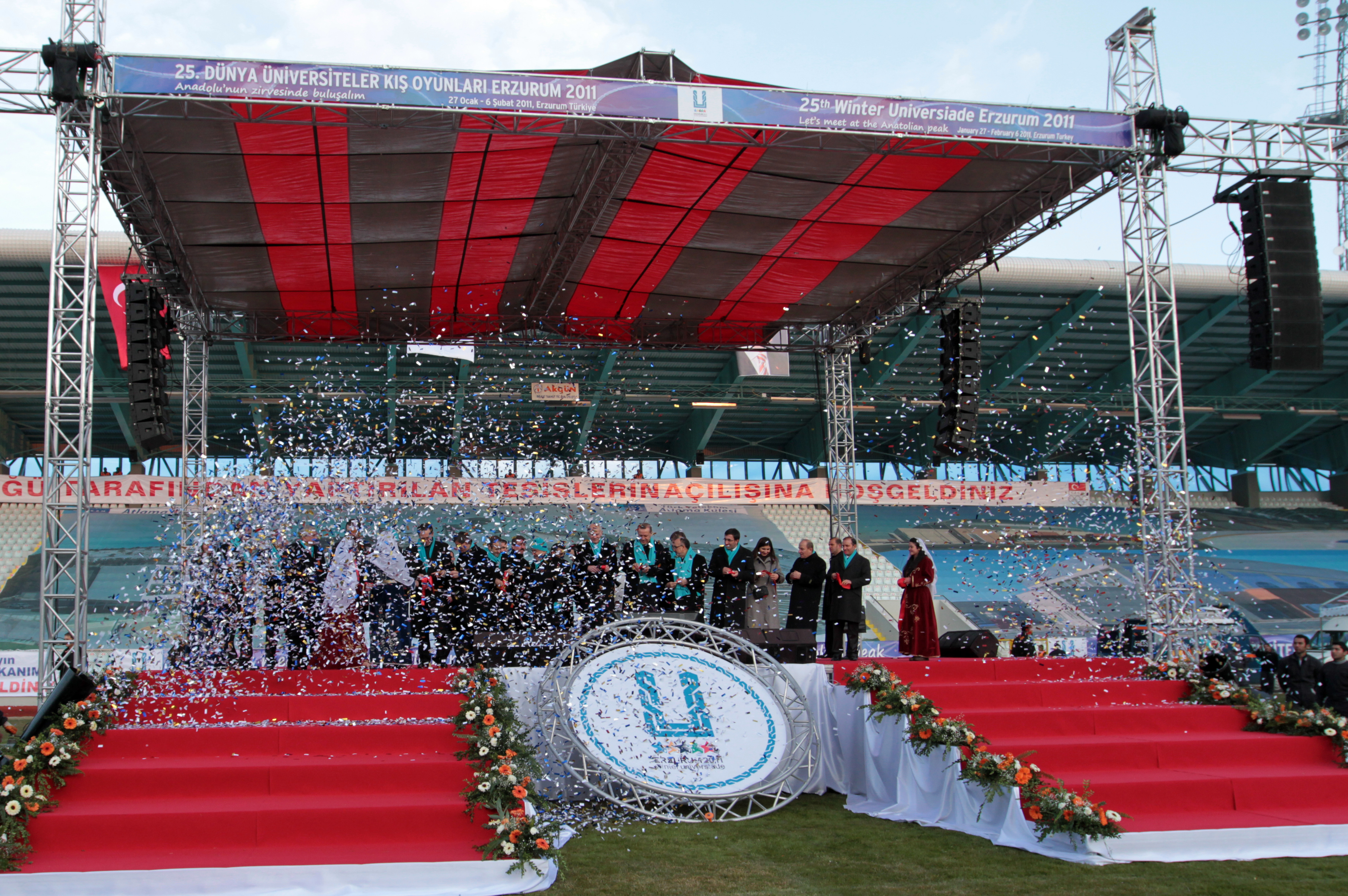
2011 Winter Universiade opening in Kazım Karabekir Stadium.

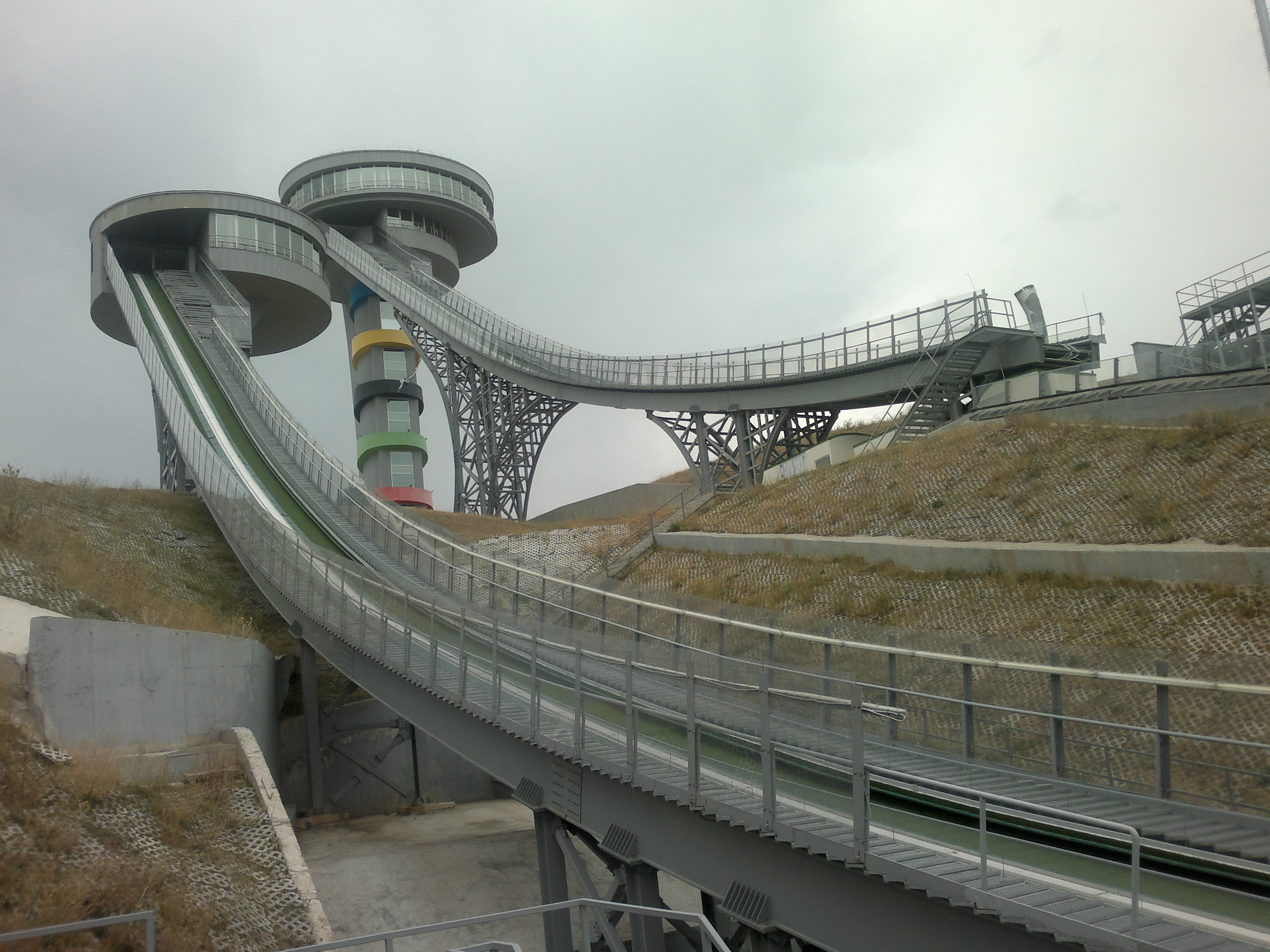
The K-95 (left) and K-125 (right) ski jumping towers at Kiremitliktepe.

- Kazım Karabekir Stadium
- Erzurum Ice Hockey Arena
- GSIM Yenişehir Ice Hockey Hall
- Milli Piyango Curling Arena
- Kiremitliktepe Ski Jump

=== International events hosted ===
Erzurum has hosted the following international winter sports events:

- 11th World Ice Hockey U18 Championships-Division III – Group B Tournament – March 9–15, 2009
- 12th World Ice Hockey U18 Championships-Division III – Group A Tournament – March 8–14, 2010
- 25th Winter Universiade – January 27 – February 6, 2011
- World Mixed Doubles Curling Championship – April 23 – 29, 2012
- European Curling Championships – Group C Tournament – October 5–10, 2012
- 11th IIHF World Championship Division III – April 15 – 21, 2012
- 2017 European Youth Olympic Winter Festival – February 12 – 17, 2017

The city's initial football club Erzurumspor, which during 1998–2001 played in the Turkish Super League, was forced to relegate to the Turkish Regional Amateur League due to financial problems. It was finally dissolved in 2015.

After dissolution of Erzurumspor due to financial problems, Erzurum is presented by BB Erzurumspor in association football. It was founded as "Gençler Birliği Gençlik Spor Kulübü" in 1967 and took present name in 2014. It played in the Turkish Super League in 2018-19 and 2020-21 seasons.

Erzurum's football venue, the Cemal Gürsel Stadium, has a seating capacity for 21,900 spectators. To be able to carry out the competitions of the Winter Universiade, a ski jumping ramp, an ice hockey arena and a curling hall were built in Erzurum.

=== Frank Lenz disappearance ===
In May 1894, American bicyclist Frank Lenz disappeared outside the city on the final leg of his quest to circumnavigate the globe on a bike.

== Climate ==
Erzurum has a humid continental climate (Köppen climate classification: Dfb, Trewartha climate classification: Dcbc) with very cold, snowy winters and warm, dry summers. The average maximum daily temperature during August is around 28 °C (82 °F). The highest recorded temperature is 36.5 °C (97.7 °F), on 31 July 2000. January is the coldest month, with an average minimum daily temperature around −16 °C (3 °F). The coldest recorded temperature is −37.2 °C (−35.0 °F) on 28 December 2002. Snow cover is frequent in winter, but the dry nature of the climate usually prevents large accumulation. Winter temperatures in this city are exceptionally cold for their latitude, being more comparable to Russia than to somewhere in the Middle East.

Climate data for Erzurum (1991–2020 normals, extremes 1929–2023)
Month	Jan	Feb	Mar	Apr	May	Jun	Jul	Aug	Sep	Oct	Nov	Dec	Year
Record high °C (°F)	10.4 (50.7)	10.6 (51.1)	21.4 (70.5)	26.5 (79.7)	29.6 (85.3)	32.3 (90.1)	35.6 (96.1)	36.5 (97.7)	33.3 (91.9)	27.0 (80.6)	20.7 (69.3)	14.0 (57.2)	36.5 (97.7)
Mean daily maximum °C (°F)	−4.0 (24.8)	−2.4 (27.7)	3.9 (39.0)	12.1 (53.8)	17.6 (63.7)	22.9 (73.2)	27.7 (81.9)	28.5 (83.3)	23.7 (74.7)	16.4 (61.5)	7.3 (45.1)	−1.2 (29.8)	12.7 (54.9)
Daily mean °C (°F)	−10.2 (13.6)	−8.8 (16.2)	−1.9 (28.6)	5.5 (41.9)	10.5 (50.9)	14.8 (58.6)	19.1 (66.4)	19.5 (67.1)	14.3 (57.7)	8.1 (46.6)	0.2 (32.4)	−7.1 (19.2)	5.3 (41.5)
Mean daily minimum °C (°F)	−15.9 (3.4)	−14.7 (5.5)	−7.5 (18.5)	−0.7 (30.7)	3.4 (38.1)	6.1 (43.0)	9.9 (49.8)	10.0 (50.0)	4.4 (39.9)	0.3 (32.5)	−6.0 (21.2)	−12.4 (9.7)	−1.9 (28.6)
Record low °C (°F)	−36.0 (−32.8)	−37.0 (−34.6)	−33.2 (−27.8)	−22.4 (−8.3)	−7.1 (19.2)	−5.6 (21.9)	−1.8 (28.8)	−1.1 (30.0)	−6.8 (19.8)	−14.1 (6.6)	−34.3 (−29.7)	−37.2 (−35.0)	−37.2 (−35.0)
Average precipitation mm (inches)	16.2 (0.64)	19.4 (0.76)	34.9 (1.37)	55.9 (2.20)	72.4 (2.85)	42.1 (1.66)	21.9 (0.86)	16.5 (0.65)	22.7 (0.89)	46.8 (1.84)	25.6 (1.01)	21.3 (0.84)	395.7 (15.58)
Average precipitation days	10.63	11.07	12.8	14.93	16.8	10.73	6.93	6.17	5.3	10.3	8.77	11.23	125.7
Average snowy days	15.2	13.96	12	4.32	0.36	0	0	0	0.04	0.8	5.16	11.84	63.68
Average relative humidity (%)	79.9	79.6	75.5	68.0	65.7	60.8	53.6	49.7	52.8	65.8	74.3	81.4	67.2
Mean monthly sunshine hours	108.5	121.5	155.0	183.0	235.6	300.0	331.7	316.2	252.0	201.5	144.0	89.9	2,438.9
Mean daily sunshine hours	3.5	4.3	5.0	6.1	7.6	10.0	10.7	10.2	8.4	6.5	4.8	2.9	6.7
Source 1: Turkish State Meteorological Service
Source 2: NOAA (humidity, 1991–2020), Meteomanz (snowy days 2000-2024)

== Notable people ==
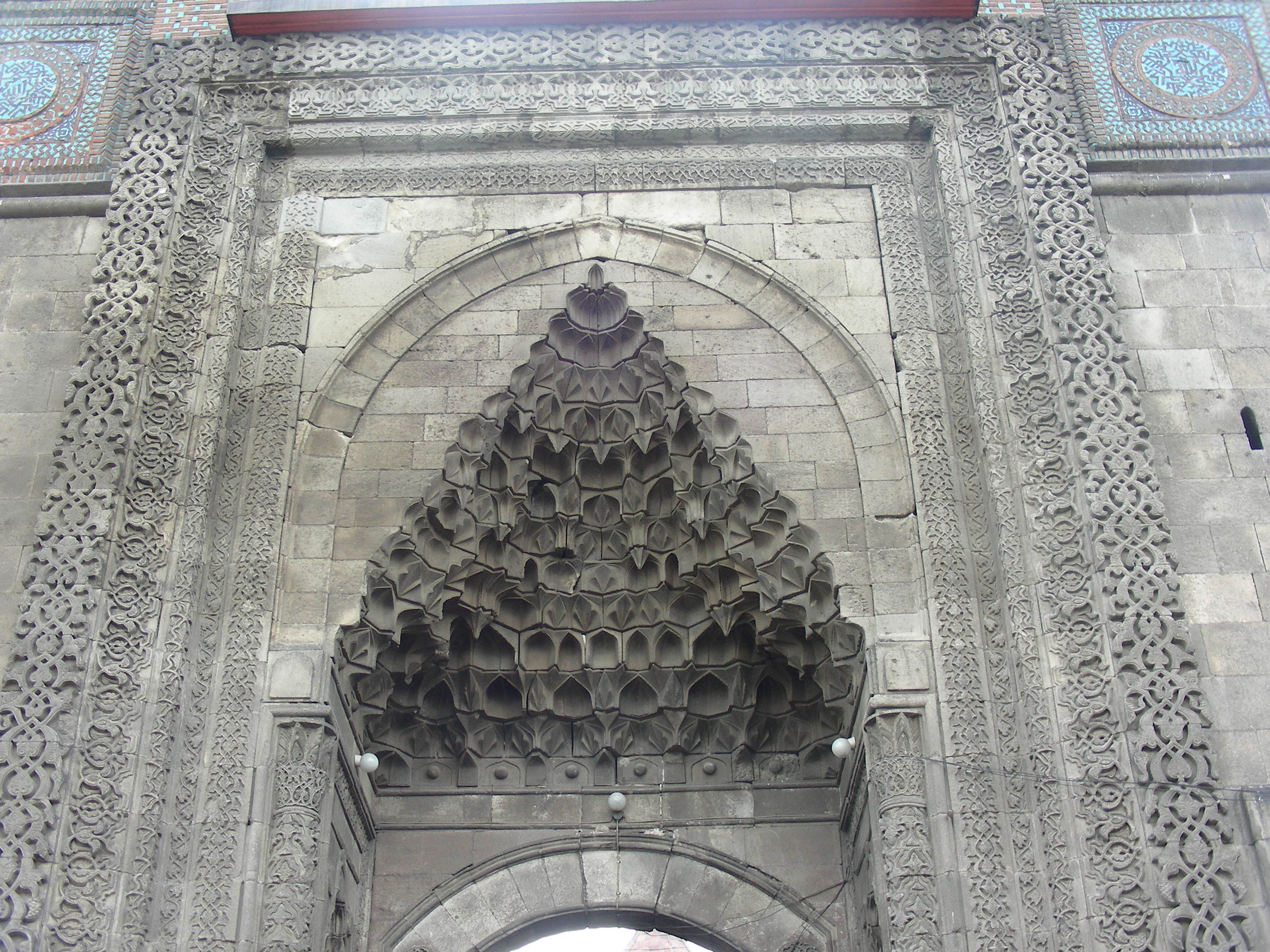
Details of the Çifte Minareli Madrasa

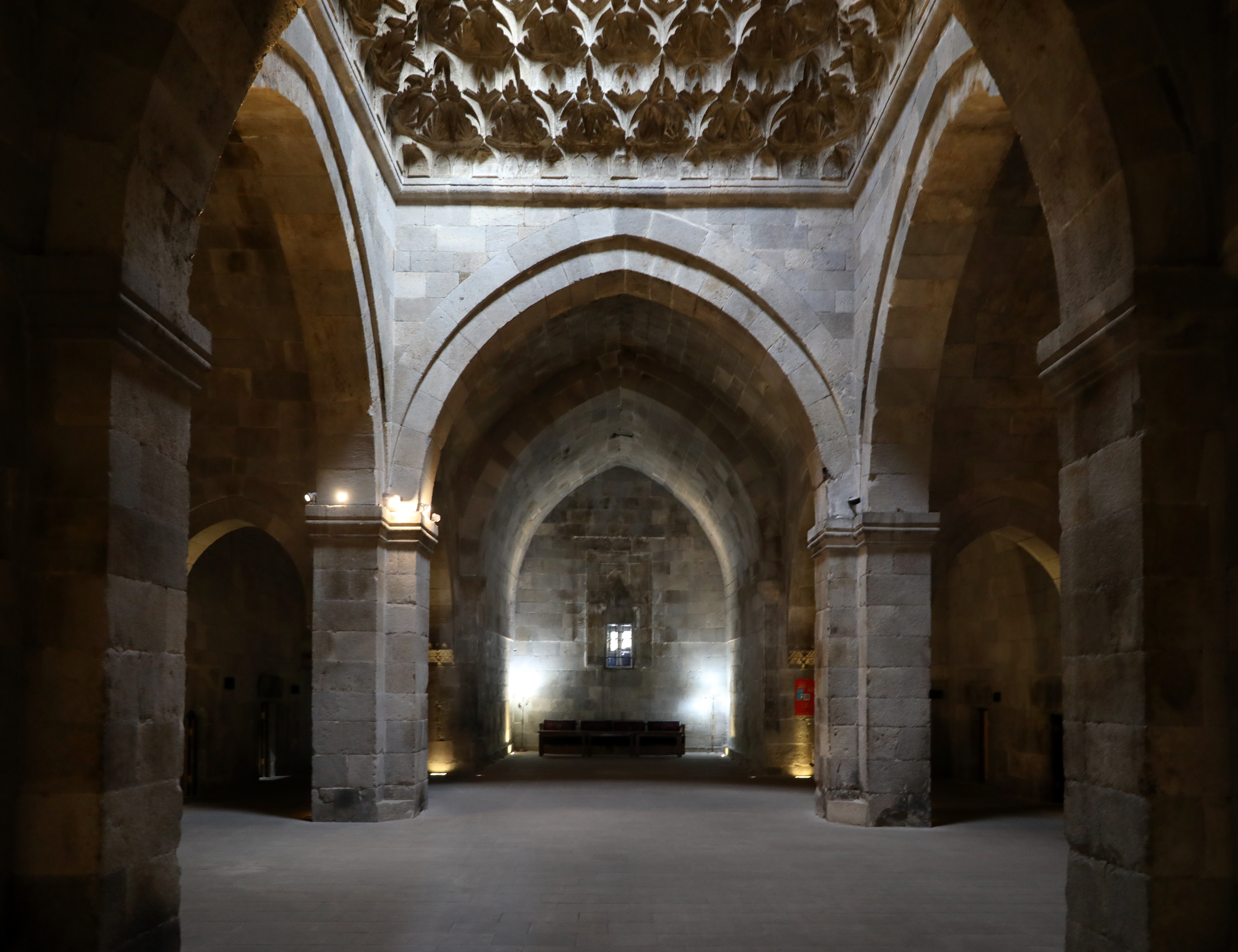
Interior of the Yakutiye Medrese

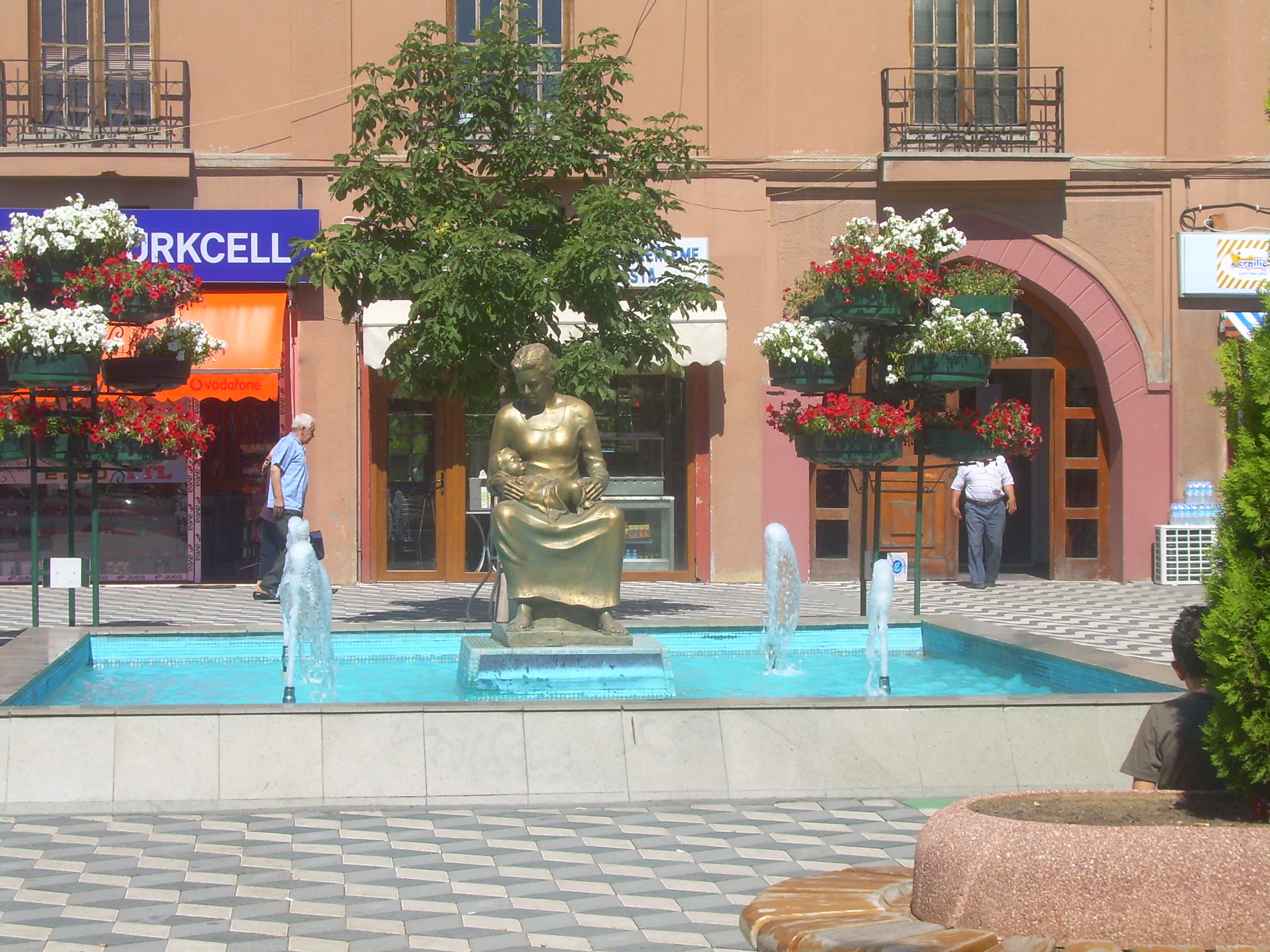
The Statue of Nene Hatun, (1857 – 22 May 1955) was a Turkish folk heroine, who at her age of twenty showed bravery during the recapture of Fort Aziziye in Erzurum from Russian forces at the start of the Russo-Turkish War of 1877–1878.

=== Armenians ===
- Hakop Karnetsi, (1618–1673) Armenian historian, geographer
- Ghoukas Karnetsi, (1722–1799) Catholicos of All Armenians (1780–1799)
- Hovhannes Karnetsi, (1750–1820) Armenian poet, pedagogue
- Armenak Arzrouni, (1901–1963) Armenian photographer
- Nikita Balieff, Armenian stage performer
- Arshak Gafavian, Armenian military commander
- Johannes Avetaranian (a.k.a. Mehmet Sükrü), Seyyid (self-proclaimed descendant of the prophet Muhammed), Christian missionary
- Karekin Pastermadjian, a leader of the Armenian Revolutionary Federation and an ambassador of Armenia to the US
- Vartkes Serengülian, Armenian deputy in the Ottoman parliament killed during the course of the Armenian Genocide
- Kourken Yanigian, American-Armenian author, engineer who murdered two Turkish consular officials in 1973

=== Turks ===
- Acun Ilıcalı Television programmer
- Adnan Polat, Ahiska-Turk, President of Galatasaray
- Arif Sağ, Turkish singer, bağlama virtuoso
- Bülent Güven, Political Scientist and Politician
- Cemal Gürsel, the fourth president of Turkey
- Fethullah Gülen, Islamic writer and preacher
- Hasan Çelebi, world-famous Islamic calligrapher
- Huseyin Avni Ulas, Influential Politician during the early period of the Republic of Turkey
- İbrahim Hakkı Erzurumi, Turkish and Sufi philosopher and encyclopedist
- Nene Hatun, female defender of Erzurum during the Russo-Turkish War of 1877–78
- Orhun Ene, Turkish Basketball player
- Ömer Nasuhi Bilmen, Islamic scholar known for his book titled The Big Book of Islamic Catechism (Büyük İslâm İlmihali)
- Recep Akdağ, minister of health of Turkey
- Şair Nef'i, 17th century Turkish poet
- Şakir Yavuz, Turkish German business executive and philanthropist

=== Others ===
- Markos Vafiadis, leading cadre of the Communist Party of Greece (KKE)

== Twin towns and sister cities ==
- Shusha, Azerbaijan
- Urmia, Iran (since 2015)

== Sources and external links ==
- Pourshariati, Parvaneh (2017). "KĀRIN". In Yarshater, Ehsan (ed.). Encyclopædia Iranica (Online ed.). Encyclopædia Iranica Foundation.
- Erzurum Chamber of Commerce
- GCatholic - former & titular see Theodosiopolis in Armenia
- Bilkent Üniversitesi Erzurum Yerleşkesi
- Over 600 well-organized pictures of museum, city, sights
- Erzurum (Garin): Its Armenian History and Traditions - includes information on local Armenian monasteries, schools, poetry, dialect, figures, proverbs, habits, etc.
- ArchNet.org. "Erzurum". Cambridge, Massachusetts, USA: MIT School of Architecture and Planning. Archived from the original on 2012-10-23.

Bibliography – Ecclesiastical history

- Pius Bonifacius Gams, Series episcoporum Ecclesiae Catholicae, Leipzig 1931, p. 441
- Michel Lequien, Oriens christianus in quatuor Patriarchatus digestus, Paris 1740, Tomo I, coll. 437–438
- Konrad Eubel, Hierarchia Catholica Medii Aevi, vol. 6, p. 402
