= Palandöken Mountain =

Mountain in Turkey

Mount Palandöken
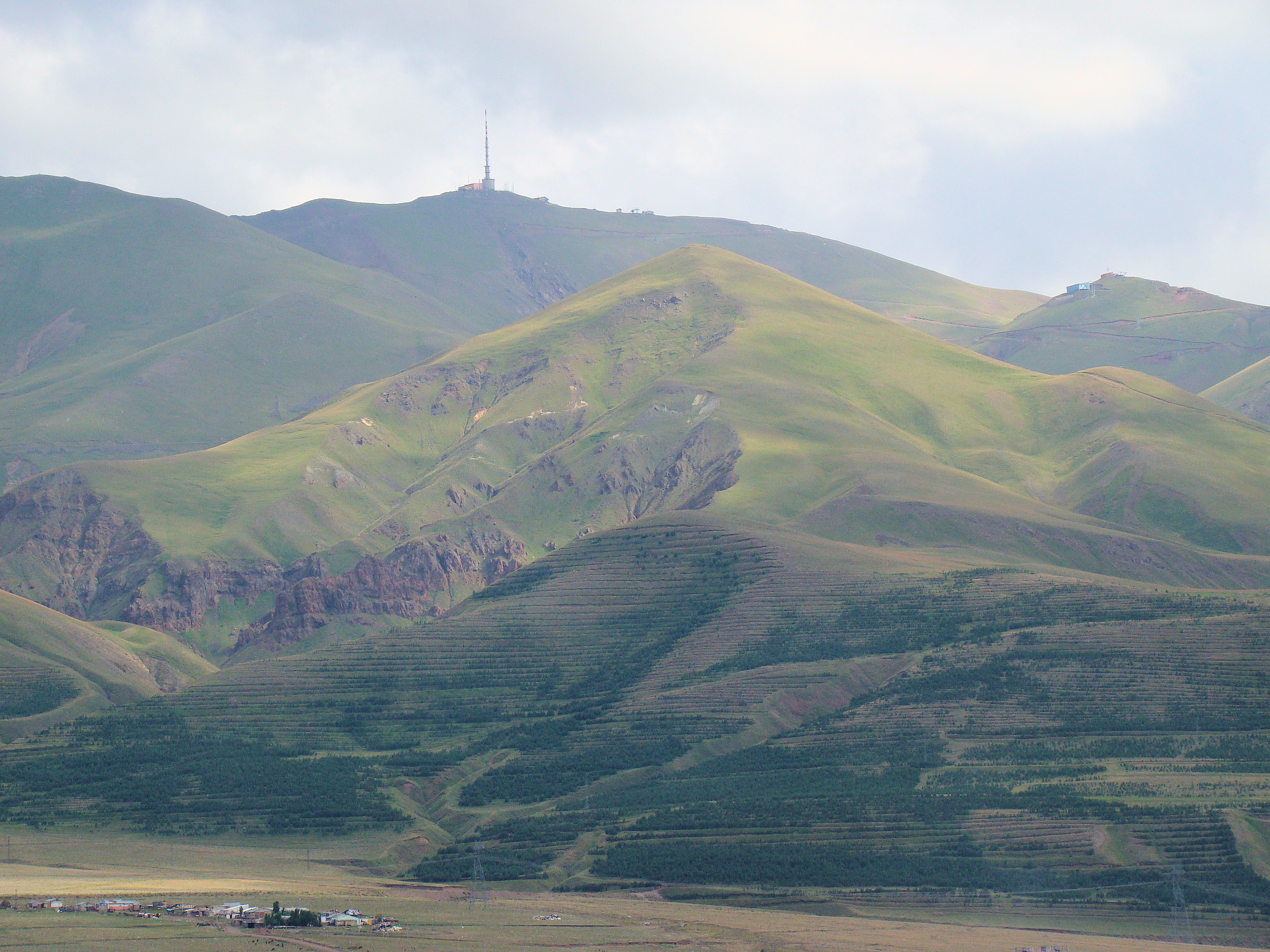
- Palandöken in August 2009, as seen from downtown Erzurum

Highest point
- Elevation: 3,271 m (10,732 ft)
- Prominence: 293 m (961 ft)
- Coordinates: 39°50′56″N 41°17′03″E

Geography
- Location within Turkey Location within Caucasus Mountains Location within Europe
- Location: Erzurum, Turkey

Palandöken Mountain (or shortly Palandöken) is a 3,271 m (10,732 ft) high tectonic mountain in Erzurum Province, Turkey. The summit is at a distance of only 10 km (6 mi) from Erzurum city center, which itself extends at an elevation of 1,950 m (6,398 ft).

== Skiing ==
On the road from Erzurum to the summit, the Palandöken ski resort is located at the mountain village called Başköy, 2,100 m (6,890 ft) high, and the distance between the station and the city is 4 km (2 mi).

The ski trail is the longest in Turkey. Due to fog and risk of avalanche, the Ejder lifts and trails are sometimes closed. The skiing season may begin in November and last as long as until June. In 2008-2010 more lifts have been opened, now there are 8 in all.

There are four hotels on the mountain: Polat Renaissance hotel, Dedeman hotel, Dedeman Ski Lodge, Palan Hotel and Xanadu Snow White.

A ski resort has been constructed at the mountain village Konaklı, about 18 km (11 mi) from the city.

== 2011 Winter Universiade ==
In 2011, Erzurum hosted the 25th Winter Universiade. The alpine skiing competition took place at the newly constructed Konaklı Ski Resort, while the freestyle skiing and snowboarding competitions was held at the Palandöken Ski Resort.
