= Grand Mosque of Erzurum =

Turkish mosque

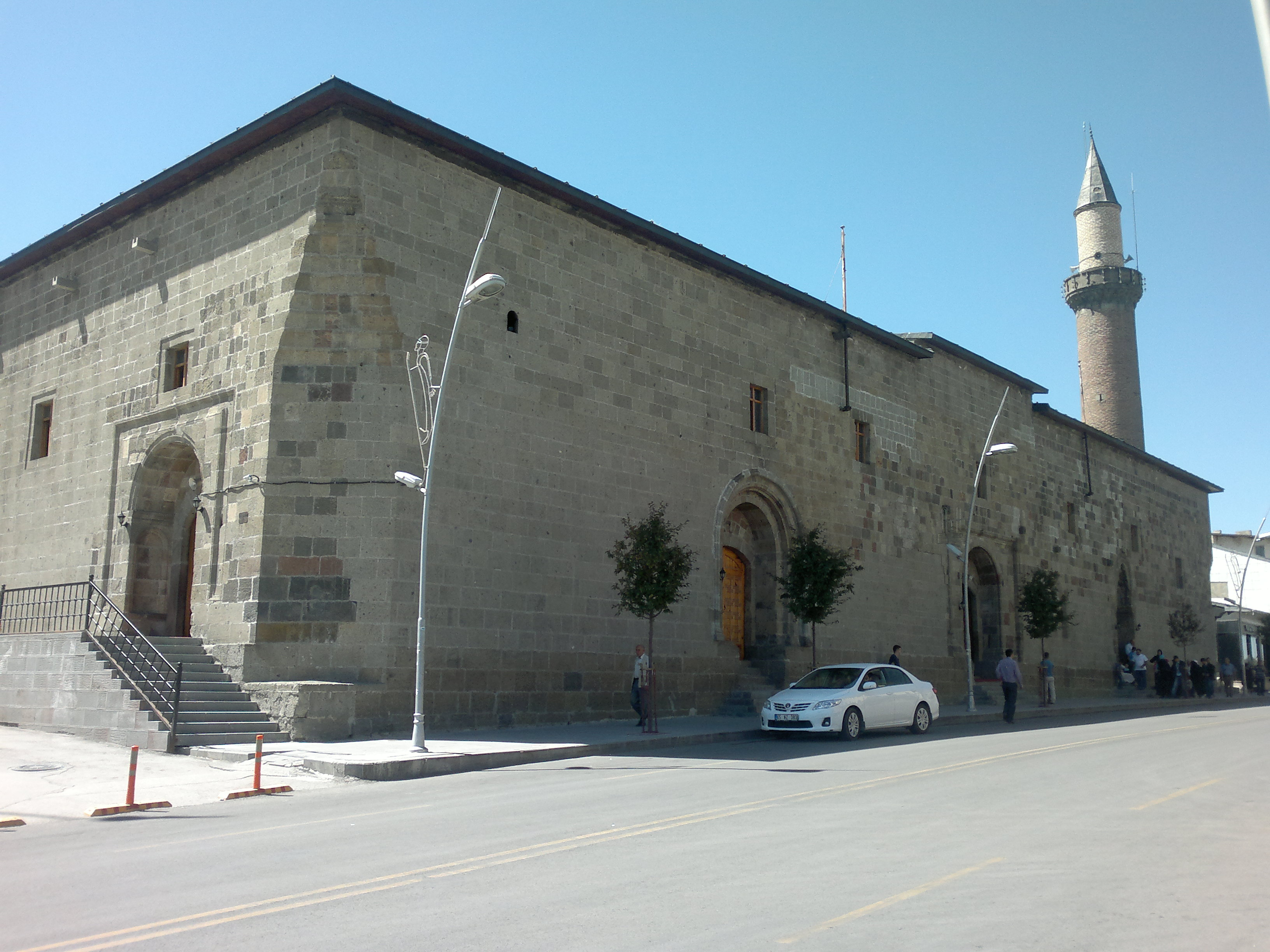

Grand Mosque of Erzurum (Turkish: Erzurum Ulu Cami) is an historic mosque in Erzurum, Turkey. It is also called "Atabey Mosque" because the Saltukids were referred to as the “Atabey”.

The mosque was built by Nasreddin Aslan Mehmed, the Emir of Saltuk, in 1179 CE, corresponding to 574 AH. The mosque is shaped in the classic rectangular model of the pre-Ottoman Seljuk era.

The mosque can hold up to 10,000 worshippers.

== Structure ==
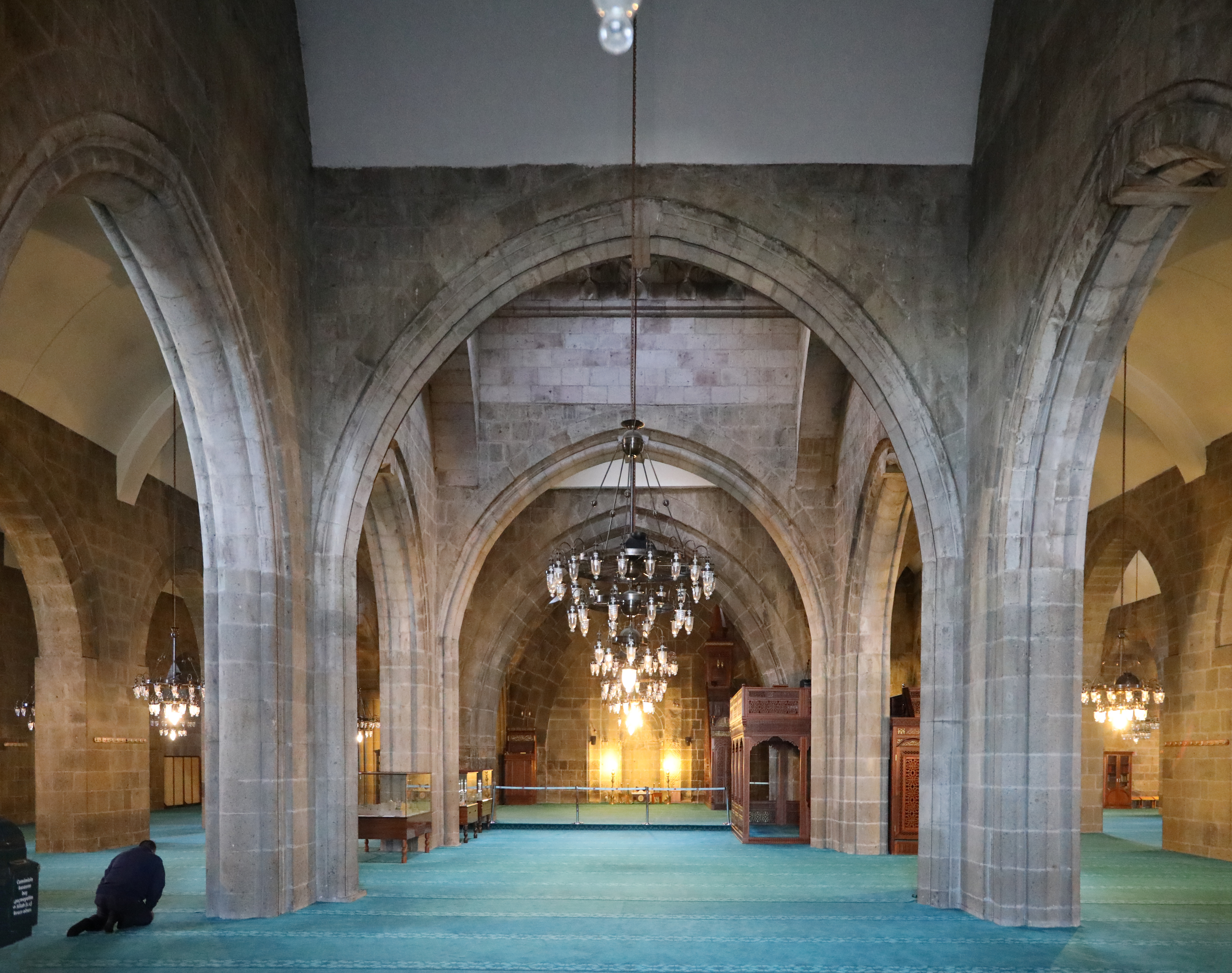
Interior

The ceiling of the mosque was built perpendicular to the mihrab wall. It consists of a wide middle nave, with three naves on both sides of it, making a total of seven naves. The mosque stands on 20 free "L", "T" and rectangular shaped pillars and measures 51 by 54 metres (167 ft × 177 ft). The roof is carried by 40 pillars, 16 of which are adjacent to the walls.

The mosque has an altar on both sides of the first door on the east side, which is also where the repair inscription made in 1860 is located. The front mihrab wall in the first construction of the mosque is covered by a dome with a large pendant resting on slightly pointed arches. This dome, known as the "Swallow Dome", was built as a corbelling, and it is believed that it belongs to the original form of the building. On the right side of the mosque, there is a brick minaret with a round body and a single chapel. The minaret can be reached from inside the mosque.

== Renovations ==
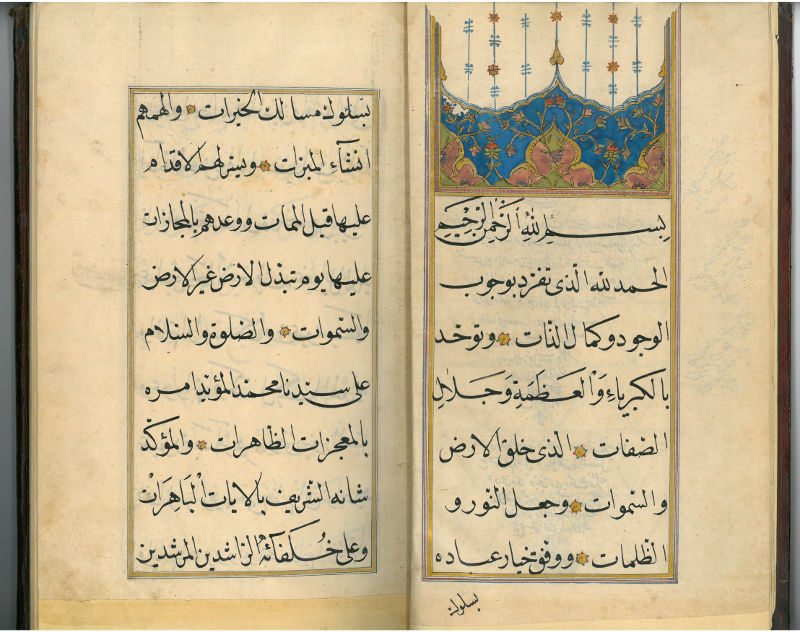
Waqf manuscript from the Grand Mosque of Erzurum. The manuscript comprises arqam (official notes) related to the mosque, occasioned by the successful completion of major restoration work on the building begun in 1639 under governor Hüseyn Pasha

The mosque was repaired five different times. It was used as a food storage during the time of Ottoman Sultan Murad IV. Erzurum Governor Huseyin Pasha repaired the mosque in 1639, Ali Efendi in 1826, followed by repairs in 1858 and 1860. The mosque was finally repaired by the General Directorate of Foundations between 1957 and 1964.

== Lighting ==
The mosque is illuminated by 28 windows. There is a repair inscription dated 1826 on the second window on the south. Two round windows which sit some way up on the mihrab wall help determine the times of two prayers: noon (Zuhr) and afternoon (Asr). The light coming from the left round window forms an oval on the floor before noon time which turns into a circle at Zuhr prayer time. In a similar manner, the light coming in from the right round window turns from an oval shape to a circle at Asr prayer time.
