= Çobandede Bridge =

Çabandede Bridge Çobandede Köprüsü
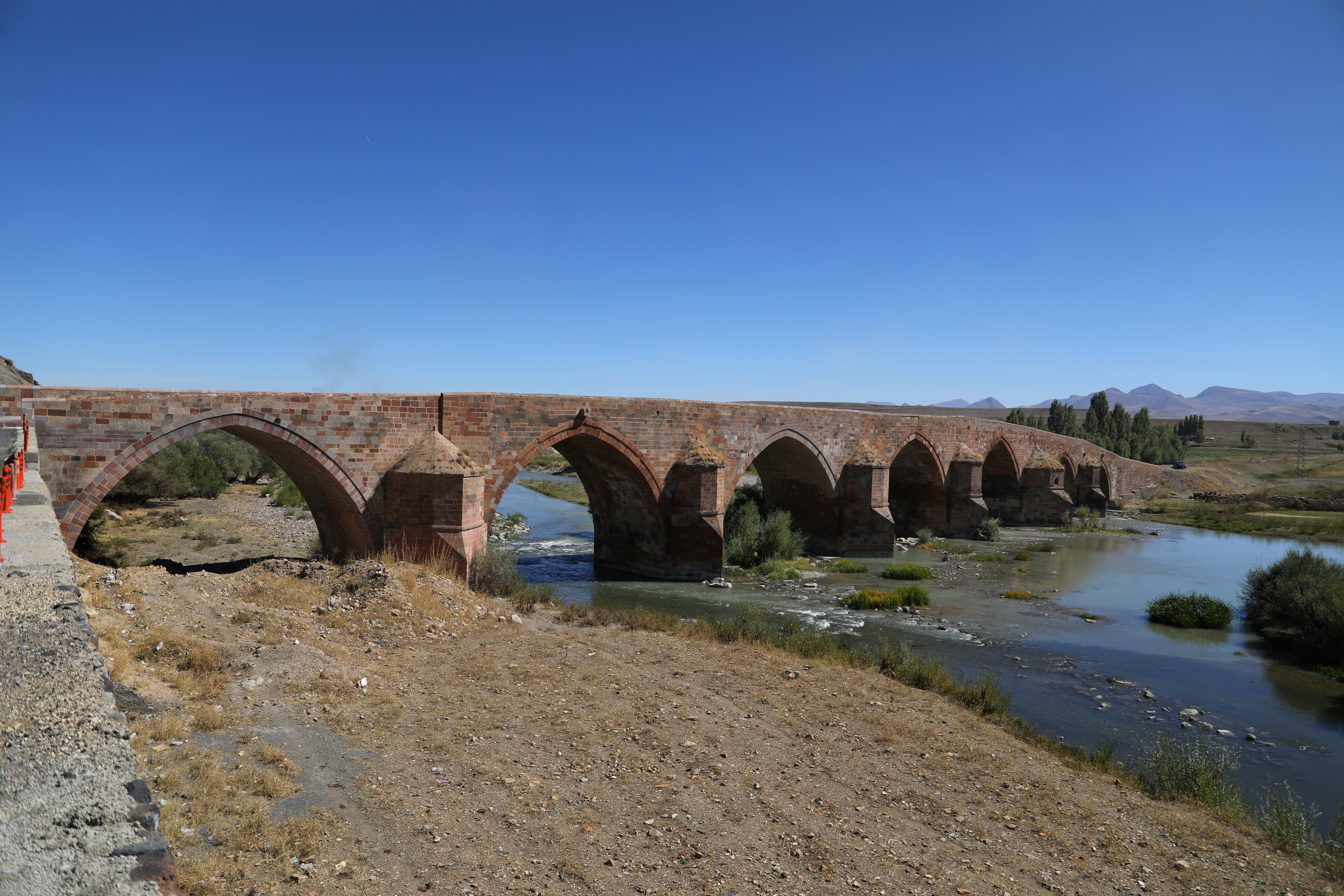
- Çaobanded Bridge
- Coordinates: 39°58′13″N 41°53′18″E
- Crosses: Aras River
- Locale: Erzurum Province, Turkey

Characteristics
- Material: Stone
- Total length: 130 m (430 ft)
- No. of spans: 6

History
- Constructed by: Chupan (?)
- Construction end: 1289

Location
- Interactive map of Çabandede Bridge

Çobandede Bridge (Turkish: Çobandede Köprüsü, also called Çoban Bridge) is a historical bridge in Erzurum Province of Turkey.

== Location ==
The bridge is at 39°58′13″N 41°53′18″E to the east of Köprüköy ilçe (district) of Erzurum Province. Köprüköy, literally "bridge Ville" is named after the bridge. The bridge is situated at the point where two tributaries of the Aras River meet. It is on the road from Erzurum to Muş. Currently, Çobandede Bridge is out of service and the Turkish state highway D.955 is over a parallel bridge about 500 metres (1,600 ft) east of Çobandede Bridge.

== History ==
In 1865 a priest, Archimandrite Timeteos, copied an inscription, in Armenian that was on the bridge. It read "this bridge, founded by the Armenians, was repaired by the Magistros under the auspices of the monastery of Sourb Astvatzatzin and the castle of Darun in the year 609" (609 is equivalent to the year 1160). In 1904, Kajberuny saw this inscription, and two others in Arabic, saying that they were located above the arches on the eastern side of the bridge. Neither the Armenian inscription nor the two Arabic inscriptions currently survive on the bridge. A fourth inscription, not seen by Kajberuny, in Arabic, still survives but in a worn and damaged condition. It is located on the bridge's parapet. About the "Magistros" mentioned in the inscription, Kortoshian writes that it may be the family title used by descendants of Grigor Magistros. He was buried in Sourb Astvatzatzin monastery close to nearby Pasinler (Hasankale); Darun (Daroynk) has been identified as either Hasankale or Dogubayazit. Turkish researchers write it was constructed during the Mongol occupation of Anatolia towards the end of the 13th century. According to one view, up to 1271 flood, there was an ancient bridge near Çobandede Bridge. Thus Çobandedde Bridge was constructed later than 1271. In a barely readable part of the inscription, there is a date that corresponds to 1289. This date is in accordance with the name of the bridge. Because towards the conclusion of the 13th century, Ilkhanid authority in Anatolia was represented by Mongol general Chupan (called Emir Çoban in Turkish).

The bridge was restored in 1727, and again in 1872. In 1946-48 it was additionally restored by the Turkish army.

== Technical details ==
The building material is cut stone with three different colors (black, red and, gray). The total length of the bridge is 130 metres (430 ft). In the original design, the bridge had seven arches. But one of the arches is now buried underground. Currently the width of the six remaining arches are; 11.50 metres (37.7 ft), 13 metres (43 ft), 14.50 metres (47.6 ft), 15.50 metres (50.9 ft), 15.50 metres (50.9 ft) and 15.50 metres (50.9 ft). There are eight chambers in the abutments.
