= Elections in Turkey =

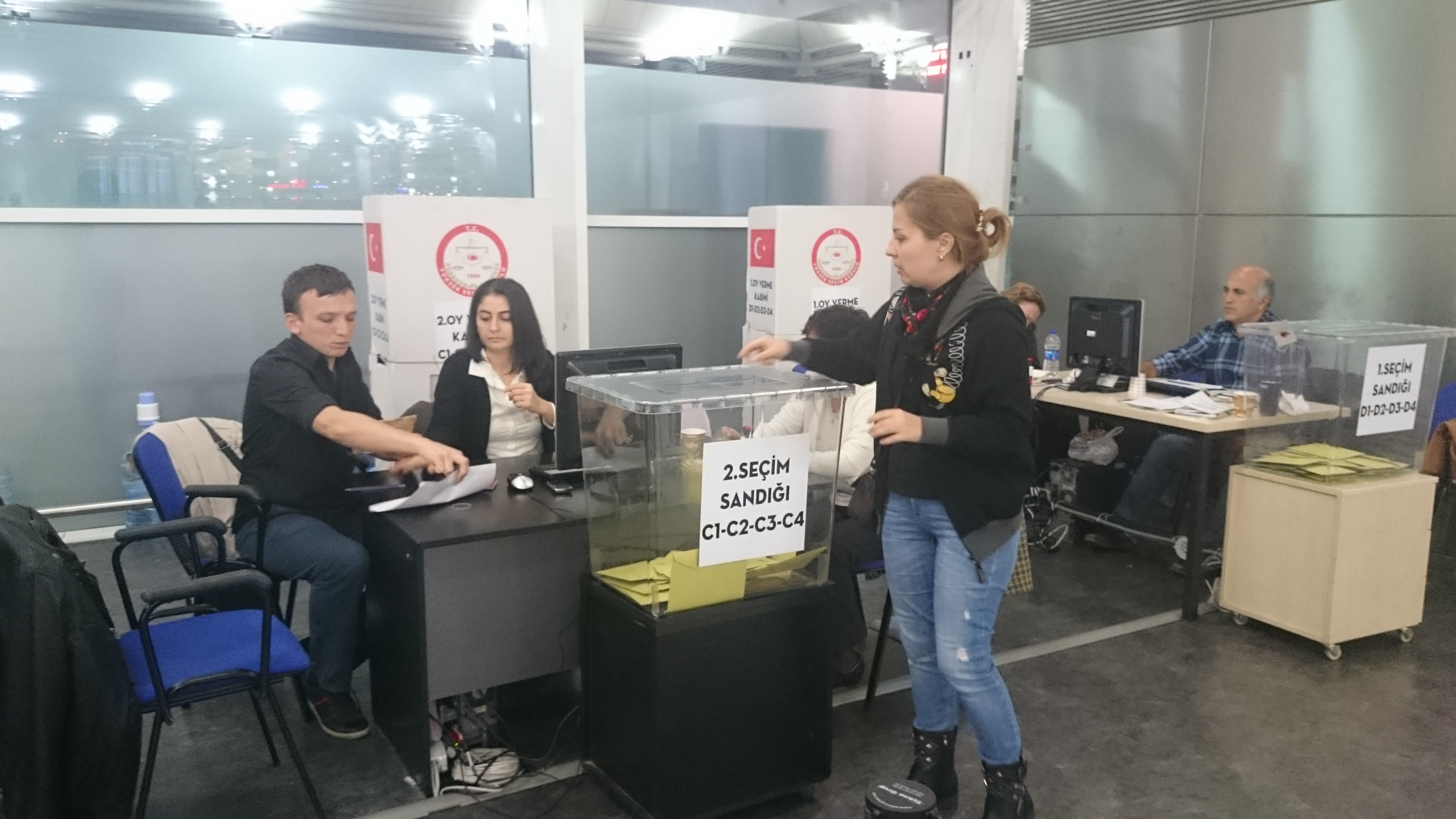
Scene inside a polling station during the Turkish general election of 2015: a voter, election officials and a standard transparent ballot box.

Elections in Turkey are held for six functions of government: presidential elections (national), parliamentary elections (national), municipality mayors (local), district mayors (local), provincial or municipal council members (local) and muhtars (local). Apart from elections, referendums are also held occasionally.

The parliamentary elections are held every five years. The Parliament (Meclis) has 600 members, elected for a five-year term by a system based on closed list proportional representation according to the D'Hondt method. Political parties are subject to an electoral threshold of 7%. Smaller parties can avoid the electoral threshold by forming an alliance with bigger parties, in which it is sufficient that total votes of the alliance passes the 7%. Independent candidates are not subject to electoral threshold.

The presidential elections are held every five years. The president is elected for a term of office of five years and is eligible for one re-election. There is an exception when a president's second term ends prematurely through a decision of the Parliament. In this case, the president can be re-elected for a third term.

To put forward a referendum regarding constitutional amendments, a supermajority (three fifths of the votes) in the parliament is required first. These kinds of referendums are binding.

Turkey has a multi-party system, with two or three strong parties and often a fourth party that is electorally successful. Since 1950, parliamentary politics has mainly been dominated by conservative parties. Even the ruling Justice and Development Party (AKP) tends to identify itself with the "tradition" of Democrat Party (DP). While on the left side of the spectrum, parties like Republican People's Party (CHP), Social Democratic Populist Party (SHP) and Democratic Left Party (DSP) have enjoyed the largest electoral success.

The constitutional referendum of 2017 enhanced the powers of the president, and since 2018, the focus has shifted from parliamentary to the presidential elections.

== Schedule ==
Past									Future		
2017	2018	2019	2020	2021	2022	2023	2024	2025	2026	2027	2028
Constitutional referendum	General (parliamentary & presidential)	Local	None	None	None	General (parliamentary & presidential)	**Local**	None	None	None	General (parliamentary & presidential)

- Bold: latest elections, italic: upcoming elections

== List of elections ==
=== Presidential elections ===
Date	Election	Notes
29 October 1923	1923 Turkish presidential election	Mustafa Kemal Atatürk was elected founding president.
1 November 1927	1927 Turkish presidential election	Mustafa Kemal Atatürk re-elected
4 May 1931	1931 Turkish presidential election	Mustafa Kemal Atatürk re-elected
1 March 1935	1935 Turkish presidential election	Mustafa Kemal Atatürk re-elected
11 November 1938	1938 Turkish presidential election	İsmet İnönü succeeded Mustafa Kemal Atatürk
3 April 1939	1939 Turkish presidential election	İsmet İnönü re-elected
8 March 1943	1943 Turkish presidential election	İsmet İnönü re-elected
5 June 1946	1946 Turkish presidential election	İsmet İnönü re-elected
22 May 1950	1950 Turkish presidential election	Celâl Bayar succeeded İsmet İnönü
14 May 1954	1954 Turkish presidential election	Celâl Bayar re-elected
1 November 1957	1957 Turkish presidential election	Celâl Bayar re-elected
26 October 1961	1961 Turkish presidential election	After the 1961 coup, Cemal Gürsel was elected president.
28 March 1966	1966 Turkish presidential election	Cevdet Sunay succeeded Cemal Gürsel
6 April 1973	1973 Turkish presidential election	Fahri Korutürk succeeded Cevdet Sunay
12 March 1980	1980 Turkish presidential election	Parties failed to elect a president, 1980 coup d'état ensued
31 October 1989	1989 Turkish presidential election	Turgut Özal succeeded Kenan Evren
16 May 1993	1993 Turkish presidential election	Süleyman Demirel succeeded Turgut Özal
5 May 2000	2000 Turkish presidential election	Ahmet Necdet Sezer succeeded Süleyman Demirel
28 August 2007	2007 Turkish presidential election	Abdullah Gül succeeded Ahmet Necdet Sezer
10 August 2014	2014 Turkish presidential election	Recep Tayyip Erdoğan succeeded Abdullah Gül
24 June 2018	2018 Turkish presidential election	Recep Tayyip Erdoğan re-elected
28 May 2023	2023 Turkish presidential election	Recep Tayyip Erdoğan re-elected

=== Parliamentary elections ===
The following sections give list of key results.

At first, Turkey had a unicameral legislature, with the main chamber being the Grand National Assembly of Turkey. This lasted until 1961, when the new Constitution of 1961 replaced the previous unicameral (one house) system with a bicameral (two house) one. The Grand National Assembly was downgraded to the position of the lower house whilst the newly founded Senate of the Republic became the upper house. However, the constitution of 1982 abolished the Senate and Turkey once again adopted a unicameral system.

Date	Election
21 July 1946	1946 Turkish general election
14 May 1950	1950 Turkish general election
2 May 1954	1954 Turkish general election
27 October 1957	1957 Turkish general election
15 October 1961	1961 Turkish general election
10 October 1965	1965 Turkish general election
12 October 1969	1969 Turkish general election
14 October 1973	1973 Turkish general election
5 June 1977	1977 Turkish general election
6 November 1983	1983 Turkish general election
29 October 1987	1987 Turkish general election
20 October 1991	1991 Turkish general election
25 December 1995	1995 Turkish general election
18 April 1999	1999 Turkish general election
3 November 2002	2002 Turkish general election
22 July 2007	2007 Turkish general election
12 June 2011	2011 Turkish general election
7 June 2015	2015 Turkish general election (Jun)
1 November 2015	2015 Turkish general election (Nov)
24 June 2018	2018 Turkish general election
14 May 2023	2023 Turkish general election

=== Senate elections 1961–80 ===
Date	Election
15 October 1961	1961 Turkish senate elections
7 June 1964	1964 Turkish senate elections
5 June 1966	1966 Turkish senate elections
2 June 1968	1968 Turkish senate elections
14 October 1973	1973 Turkish senate elections
12 October 1975	1975 Turkish senate elections
7 June 1977	1977 Turkish senate elections
14 October 1979	1979 Turkish senate elections

=== Local elections ===
The Turkish administrative system defines three different district types for local elections: villages, cities and metropolitan cities. The difference between cities and metropolitan cities derives from the size of the population. Cities with more than 750,000 residents are labeled as metropolitan cities while the rest are simply called cities. There are 31 metropolitan cities and 50 cities across Turkey, and voters in both will have a total of four votes. Citizens have the opportunity to vote for the following offices, depending on the type of area they reside:

People living in metropolitan cities:

- Metropolitan mayor
- District mayor
- District council members
- Muhtar

People living in cities:

- Provincial assembly members
- District mayor
- District council members
- Muhtar

People living in villages:

- Provincial assembly members
- Muhtar

This is a summary of the past local elections:

- 1930 Turkish local elections
  - CHP: 502 municipalities
  - SCF: 40 municipalities
- 1934 Turkish local elections
- 1938 Turkish local elections
- 1942 Turkish local elections
- 1946 Turkish local elections
  - CHP: 54.65%
  - DP: 43.35%
- 1950 Turkish local elections – September 3, 1950
  - DP: 560 municipalities
  - CHP: 40 municipalities
- 1955 Turkish local elections
- 1963 Turkish local elections – November 17, 1963
  - AP: 45.48%
  - CHP: 36.22%
  - YTP: 6.51%
  - MP: 3.09%
  - CKMP: 3.06%
  - TİP: 0.4%
  - ...others
- 1968 Turkish local elections – June 2, 1968
  - AP: 49.06%
  - CHP: 27.9%
  - GP: 6.62%
  - MP: 3.5%
  - TİP: 2.72%
  - BP: 1.64%
  - ...others
- 1973 Turkish local elections – December 9, 1973
  - CHP: 37.09%
  - AP: 32.32%
  - DP: 10.75%
  - MSP: 6.2%
  - CGP: 2.9%
  - MHP: 1.33%
  - ...others
- 1977 Turkish local elections – December 11, 1977
  - CHP: 41.73%
  - AP: 37.1%
  - MSP: 6.91%
  - MHP: 6.62%
  - DP: 1.0%
  - ...others
- 1984 Turkish local elections – March 25, 1984
  - ANAP: 41.52%
  - SODEP: 23.35%
  - DYP: 13.25%
  - HP: 8.76%
  - MDP: 7.09%
  - RP: 4.4%
  - Independent: 1.63%
- 1989 Turkish local elections – March 26, 1989
  - SHP: 28.69%
  - DYP: 25.13%
  - ANAP: 21.8%
  - RP: 9.8%
  - DSP: 9.03%
  - MHP: 4.14%
  - ...others
- 1994 Turkish local elections – March 27, 1994
  - DYP: 21.41%
  - ANAP: 21.09%
  - RP: 19.14%
  - SHP: 13.53%
  - DSP: 8.75%
  - MHP: 7.95%
  - CHP: 4.61%
  - ...others
- 1999 Turkish local elections – April 18, 1999
  - DSP: 18.7%
  - MHP: 17.17%
  - FP: 16.48%
  - ANAP: 15.03%
  - DYP: 13.21%
  - CHP: 11.08%
  - ...others
- 2004 Turkish local elections – March 28, 2004
  - AKP: 41.6%
  - CHP: 18.2%
  - MHP: 10.4%
  - DYP: 9.9%
- 2009 Turkish local elections – March 22, 2009
  - AKP: 38.99%
  - CHP: 23.23%
  - MHP: 16.13%
  - ...others
- 2014 Turkish local elections – March 30, 2014
  - AKP: 43.31%
  - CHP: 25.59%
  - MHP: 17.63%
  - ...others
- 2019 Turkish local elections – March 31, 2019
  - AKP: 44.32%
  - CHP: 30.10%
  - İYİ: 7.45%
  - ...others
- 2024 Turkish local elections - March 31, 2024
  - CHP: 37.77%
  - AKP: 35.49%
  - YRP: 6.19%
  - ...others

=== By-elections ===
If too many seats become vacant in the parliament or if elections in a district is not properly conducted, then a by-election is required to take place.

- 1936 Turkish parliamentary by-elections
- 1945 Turkish parliamentary by-elections
- 1947 Turkish parliamentary by-elections
- 1948 Turkish parliamentary by-elections
- 1949 Turkish parliamentary by-elections
- 1951 Turkish parliamentary by-elections
- 1966 Turkish parliamentary by-elections
- 1968 Turkish parliamentary by-elections
- 1975 Turkish parliamentary by-elections
- 1979 Turkish parliamentary by-elections
- 1986 Turkish parliamentary by-elections
- 2003 Turkish parliamentary by-elections

=== Referendums ===
Date	Referendum
9 July 1961	1961 Turkish constitutional referendum
7 November 1982	1982 Turkish constitutional referendum
6 September 1987	1987 Turkish constitutional referendum
25 September 1988	1988 Turkish constitutional referendum
21 October 2007	2007 Turkish constitutional referendum
12 September 2010	2010 Turkish constitutional referendum
16 April 2017	2017 Turkish constitutional referendum

== Voter turnout ==
The voter turnout for the average of 18 parliamentary election is 81.4%; of the local elections is 78.7% and of the referendums is 83.1%. Turkey relatively has a high voter turnout rate comparing to modern democracies. The participation rate in Turkey is also higher than the participation rates in countries where compulsory voting is loosely applied. With the exception of 1960–1970, voter turnout rate in Turkey is above the world average from 1950 to the present in Turkey.

Voter turnout at parliamentary elections [1950-2023]
1950	1954	1957	1961	1965	1969	1973	1977	1983	1987
89.3%	88.6%	76.6%	81.4%	71.3%	64.3%	66.8%	72.4%	92.3%	93.3%
1991	1995	1999	2002	2007	2011	2015	2018	2023	
83.9%	85.2%	87.1%	79.1%	84.2%	83.2%	85.2%	86.2%	87.1%	

== See also ==
- Human rights in Turkey
- Censorship in Turkey
- Democracy in Turkey
- Democratic backsliding in Turkey
- List of cabinets of Turkey
- Multi-party period of the Republic of Turkey
- Parliamentary terms of Turkey
- Government of Turkey
