= List of presidents of Turkey =

The following is a complete list of people who held the office of President of Turkey. There have been twelve heads of state since the inception of the republican period in 1923, following the Turkish War of Independence. For a list of rulers of the predecessor Ottoman Empire, see List of sultans of the Ottoman Empire.

== List of presidents (1923–present) ==
Political parties

Republican People's Party (CHP)
Democrat Party (DP)
Justice Party (AP)
True Path Party (DYP)
Justice and Development Party (AK Party)

Other factions

Military
Independent

Status

Denotes acting president

No.	Portrait	Name (Birth–Death)	Elected	Took office	Left office	Time in office	Political party	Previous office
Parliamentary system (1923–2018)
1		Mustafa Kemal Atatürk (1881–1938)	1923	29 October 1923	10 November 1938 (Died in office)	15 years, 12 days	CHP	1st speaker of the Grand National Assembly
1		Mustafa Kemal Atatürk (1881–1938)	1927	29 October 1923	10 November 1938 (Died in office)	15 years, 12 days	CHP	1st speaker of the Grand National Assembly
1		Mustafa Kemal Atatürk (1881–1938)	1931	29 October 1923	10 November 1938 (Died in office)	15 years, 12 days	CHP	1st speaker of the Grand National Assembly
1		Mustafa Kemal Atatürk (1881–1938)	1935	29 October 1923	10 November 1938 (Died in office)	15 years, 12 days	CHP	1st speaker of the Grand National Assembly
—		Abdülhalik Renda (1881–1957)	—	10 November 1938	11 November 1938	1 day	CHP	4th speaker of the Grand National Assembly
2		İsmet İnönü (1884–1973)	1938	11 November 1938	22 May 1950	11 years, 192 days	CHP	1st prime minister of Turkey
2		İsmet İnönü (1884–1973)	1939	11 November 1938	22 May 1950	11 years, 192 days	CHP	1st prime minister of Turkey
2		İsmet İnönü (1884–1973)	1943	11 November 1938	22 May 1950	11 years, 192 days	CHP	1st prime minister of Turkey
2		İsmet İnönü (1884–1973)	1946	11 November 1938	22 May 1950	11 years, 192 days	CHP	1st prime minister of Turkey
3		Celâl Bayar (1883–1986)	1950	22 May 1950	27 May 1960 (Deposed)	10 years, 5 days	DP	3rd prime minister of Turkey
3		Celâl Bayar (1883–1986)	1954	22 May 1950	27 May 1960 (Deposed)	10 years, 5 days	DP	3rd prime minister of Turkey
3		Celâl Bayar (1883–1986)	1957	22 May 1950	27 May 1960 (Deposed)	10 years, 5 days	DP	3rd prime minister of Turkey
—		National Unity Committee; Milli Birlik Komitesi; Chairman: General Cemal Gürsel (1895–1966)	—	27 May 1960	26 October 1961	1 year, 152 days	Military	10th commander of the Turkish Army
4		Cemal Gürsel (1895–1966)	1961	26 October 1961	28 March 1966 (Note: Gürsel was removed from office due to ill health on 2 February 1966 and İbrahim Şevki Atasagun assumed the duties of the President and with it became acting President, although Gürsel officially held the office until 28 March 1966.)	4 years, 153 days	Independent	Chairman of the National Unity Committee
—		İbrahim Şevki Atasagun (1899–1984)	—	2 February 1966	28 March 1966	54 days	AP	3rd chairman of the Senate of Turkey
5		Cevdet Sunay (1899–1982)	1966	28 March 1966	28 March 1973	7 years	Independent	12th chief of the Turkish General Staff
—		Tekin Arıburun (1903–1993)	—	28 March 1973	6 April 1973	9 days	AP	4th chairman of the Senate of Turkey
6		Fahri Korutürk (1903–1987)	1973	6 April 1973	6 April 1980	7 years	Independent	3rd commander of the Turkish Navy
—		İhsan Sabri Çağlayangil (1908–1993)	—	6 April 1980	12 September 1980 (Deposed)	159 days	AP	6th chairman of the Senate of Turkey
—		National Security Council; Milli Güvenlik Kurulu; Chairman: General Kenan Evren (1917–2015)	—	12 September 1980	9 November 1982	2 years, 58 days	Military	17th chief of the Turkish General Staff
7		Kenan Evren (1917–2015)	1982	9 November 1982	9 November 1989	7 years	Independent	Chairman of the National Security Council
8		Turgut Özal (1927–1993)	1989	9 November 1989	17 April 1993 (Died in office)	3 years, 159 days	Independent (Note: Nonpartisan within ANAP.)	19th prime minister of Turkey
—		Hüsamettin Cindoruk (1933–2026)	—	17 April 1993	16 May 1993	29 days	DYP	17th speaker of the Grand National Assembly
9		Süleyman Demirel (1924–2015)	1993	16 May 1993	16 May 2000	7 years	Independent (Note: Nonpartisan within DYP.)	12th prime minister of Turkey
10		Ahmet Necdet Sezer (born 1941)	2000	16 May 2000	28 August 2007	7 years, 104 days	Independent	14th president of the Constitutional Court of Turkey
11		Abdullah Gül (born 1950)	2007	28 August 2007	28 August 2014	7 years	Independent (Note: Nonpartisan within AK Party.)	41th minister of foreign affairs of Turkey
12		Recep Tayyip Erdoğan (born 1954)	2014	28 August 2014	9 July 2018	3 years, 315 days	Independent	25th prime minister of Turkey
		Recep Tayyip Erdoğan (born 1954)	2014	28 August 2014	9 July 2018	3 years, 315 days	AK Party (Note: After the 2017 constitutional referendum, the president of Turkey obtained the right to join a political party.)	25th prime minister of Turkey
Presidential system (2018–present)
(12)		Recep Tayyip Erdoğan (born 1954)	2018	9 July 2018	Incumbent	8 years, 133 days	AK Party	25th prime minister of Turkey
(12)		Recep Tayyip Erdoğan (born 1954)	2023	9 July 2018	Incumbent	8 years, 133 days	AK Party	25th prime minister of Turkey

== Presidential statistics ==
=== Time in office ===
This page is a list of the 12 presidents of the Republic of Turkey, ranked according to their terms of office.

Longest presidency	Shortest presidency
Mustafa Kemal Atatürk	Turgut Özal
15 years and 12 days (1923–1938)	3 years 159 days (1989-1993)

Rank	President	Length	Order of presidency	Notes
1.	Mustafa Kemal Atatürk	15 years and 12 days	1.	First President
2.	İsmet İnönü	11 years and 192 days	2.	
3.	Recep Tayyip Erdoğan	11 years and 30 days	12.	
4.	Celâl Bayar	10 years and 5 days	3.	
5.	Ahmet Necdet Sezer	7 years and 104 days	10.	
6.	Cevdet Sunay	7 years and 1 day	5.	
6.	Fahri Korutürk	7 years and 1 day	6.	
6.	Kenan Evren	7 years and 1 day	7.	
6.	Süleyman Demirel	7 years and 1 day	9.	
6.	Abdullah Gül	7 years and 1 day	11.	
11.	Cemal Gürsel	4 years and 153 days	4.	
12.	Turgut Özal	3 years and 159 days	8.	

=== Directly elected ===
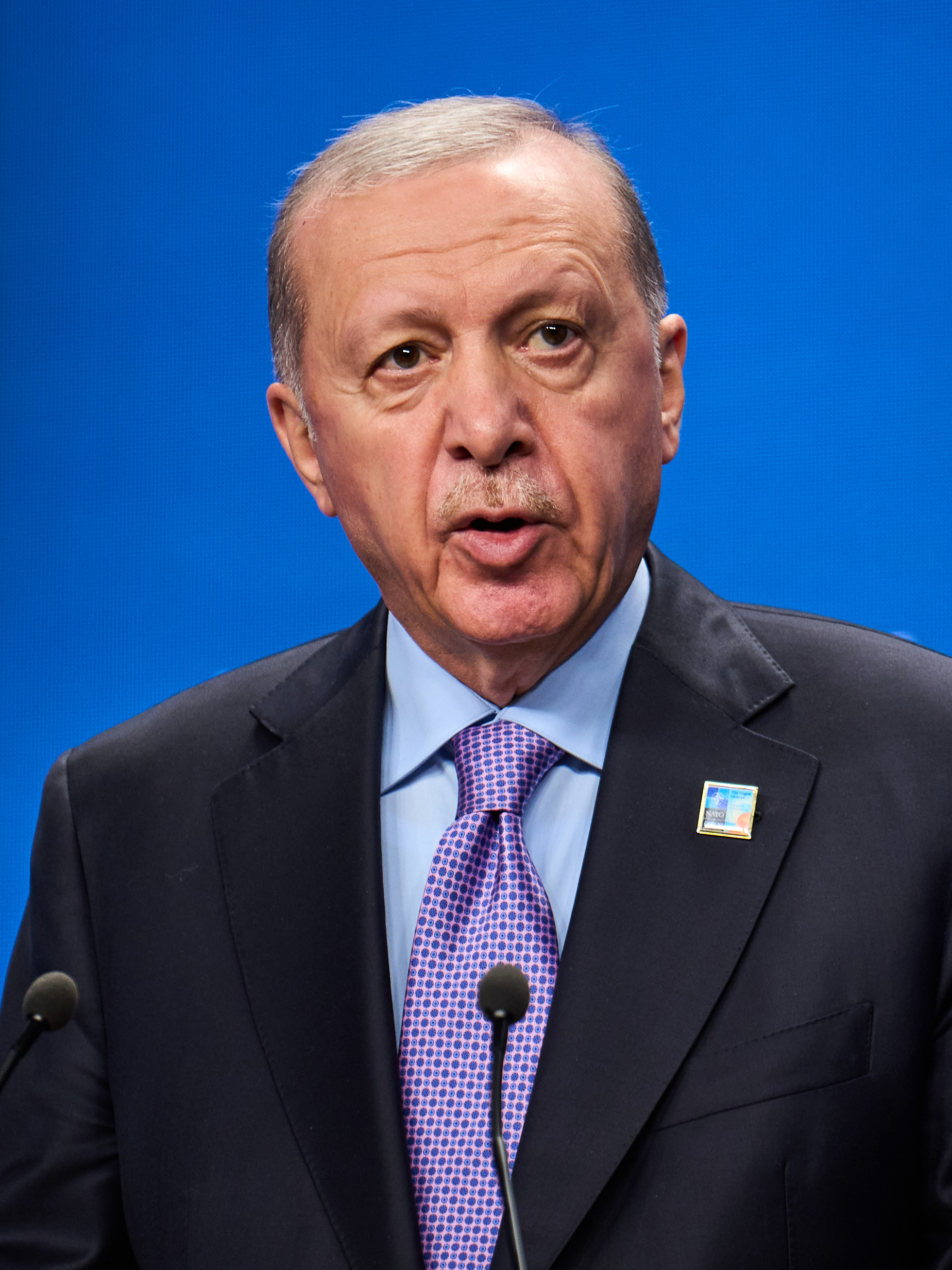
- Recep Tayyip Erdoğan, the 12th and incumbent President, is the first and only president to be directly elected by popular vote.

=== Deaths in office ===
- Mustafa Kemal Atatürk
- Turgut Özal
Mustafa Kemal Atatürk

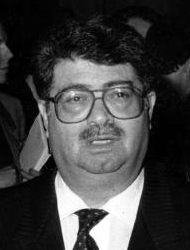
Turgut Özal

=== Political party membership ===
- Mustafa Kemal Atatürk, 1st President Atatürk was the founder, member, and chairman of Turkey's first political party, the Republican People's Party (CHP).
- İsmet İnönü, 2nd President During his tenure, İnönü was a member and chairman of the Republican People's Party (CHP).
- Celal Bayar, 3rd President During his tenure, Bayar was a member of the Democrat Party, the first party to come to power in Turkey after the CHP.
- Recep Tayyip Erdoğan, 12th and current President Following the 2017 referendum, Erdoğan rejoined the Justice and Development Party (AK Parti), which he had founded. He still serves as the chairman of the AK Parti.
Mustafa Kemal Atatürk

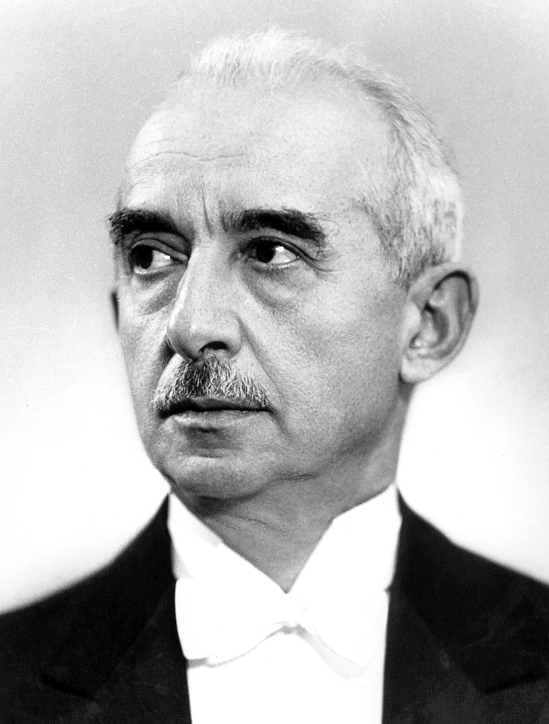
İsmet İnönü

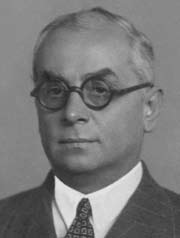
Celal Bayar

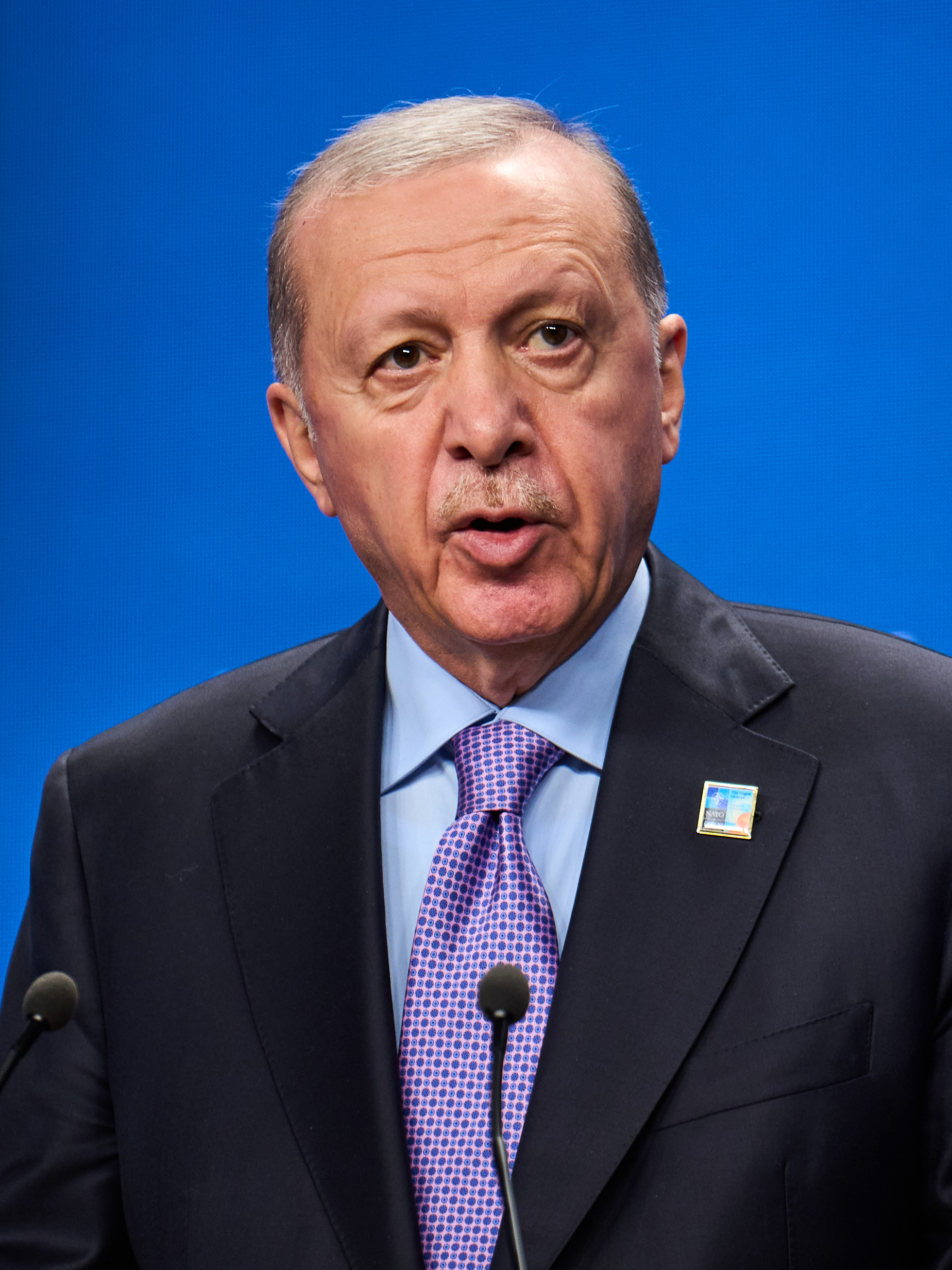
Recep Tayyip Erdoğan

== See also ==
- President of Turkey
  - List of burial places of presidents of Turkey
- Vice President of Turkey
- Prime Minister of Turkey
  - List of prime ministers of Turkey
- Çankaya Mansion
- Presidential Complex (Turkey)
  - Nation's Library
- Presidential Guard Regiment (Turkey)
- Turkish presidential elections
