= Turkish presidential elections =

Type of election in Turkey

Turkish presidential elections are held in Turkey as part of the general elections every five years, to determine who will serve as the President of Turkey.

There have been 22 elections for the President of Turkey since the establishment of the republic, in 1923, electing 12 distinct Turkish citizens as president. Mustafa Kemal Atatürk and İsmet İnönü were elected four times, Celal Bayar and Recep Tayyip Erdoğan were elected three times, Cemal Gürsel, Cevdet Sunay, Fahri Korutürk, Turgut Özal, Süleyman Demirel, Ahmet Necdet Sezer and Abdullah Gül were each elected once. Kenan Evren became the president without an election, so that he assumed the title by the ratification of the present constitution on 7 November 1982 (Constitution of Turkey provisional article 1).

== History ==
Throughout the years, the nature and importance of Turkish presidential elections have changed as a result of constitutional amendments.

=== Indirect elections (1923-2014) ===
Before 2014, the president was elected by MPs in the Turkish parliament.

=== Direct elections since 2014 ===
The 2014 presidential elections was the first direct election of a president, a result of a 2007 referendum created and backed by the ruling Justice and Development Party (AK party).

=== Presidential system since 2018 ===
Following the approval of constitutional changes in a referendum held in 2017, the elected President became both the head of state and head of government. As a result, the parliamentary system of government was replaced with an executive presidency and a presidential system.

== Acting presidents ==
In case of a temporary absence of the president on account of illness, travel abroad, or similar circumstances, the Vice President serves as acting president, and exercises the powers of the president until the president resumes his functions, and if the presidency falls vacant as a result of death or resignation or for any other reason, until the election of a new president.

== List of Turkish presidential elections ==
Elections	Date	Eligible voters	Number of votes	Number of candidates	Winner	Number of Votes for Winner	Percentage of Vote
Indirect elections
1st election	29 October 1923	286	158	1	Mustafa Kemal Atatürk	158	100
2nd election	1 November 1927	316	288	1	Mustafa Kemal Atatürk	288	100
3rd election	4 May 1931	317	289	1	Mustafa Kemal Atatürk	289	100
4th election	1 March 1935	399	386	1	Mustafa Kemal Atatürk	386	100
5th election	11 November 1938	399	348	1	İsmet İnönü	348	100
6th election	3 April 1939	429	413	1	İsmet İnönü	413	100
7th election	8 March 1943	455	435	1	İsmet İnönü	435	100
8th election	5 June 1946	465	451	3	İsmet İnönü	388	86
9th election	22 May 1950	487	453	2	Celâl Bayar	387	85
10th election	14 May 1954	541	513	2	Celâl Bayar	486	95
11th election	1 November 1957	638	607	1	Celâl Bayar	434	71
12th election	26 October 1961	541	513	1	Cemal Gürsel	486	95
13th election	28 March 1966	636	532	2	Cevdet Sunay	461	87
14th election	6 April 1973	635	557	4	Fahri Korutürk	365	66
15th election	12 March 1980	-	-	-	(Note: The ongoing election was called off because of the 1980 coup d'état.)	-	-
16th election	31 October 1989	450	285	2	Turgut Özal	263	92
17th election	16 May 1993	450	431	4	Süleyman Demirel	244	57
18th election	5 May 2000	550	533	10	Ahmet Necdet Sezer	330	62
19th election	28 August 2007	550	448	3	Abdullah Gül	339	76
Direct elections
20th election	10 August 2014	55,892,858	41,026,021	3	Recep Tayyip Erdoğan	21,000,143	51.8
21st election	24 June 2018	59,367,469	51,197,959	6	Recep Tayyip Erdoğan	26,330,823	52.6
22nd election	28 May 2023	64,197,419	54,023,616	4	Recep Tayyip Erdoğan	27,834,692	52.2

== See also ==
- Elections in Turkey
- List of presidents of Turkey
