= Referendums in Turkey =

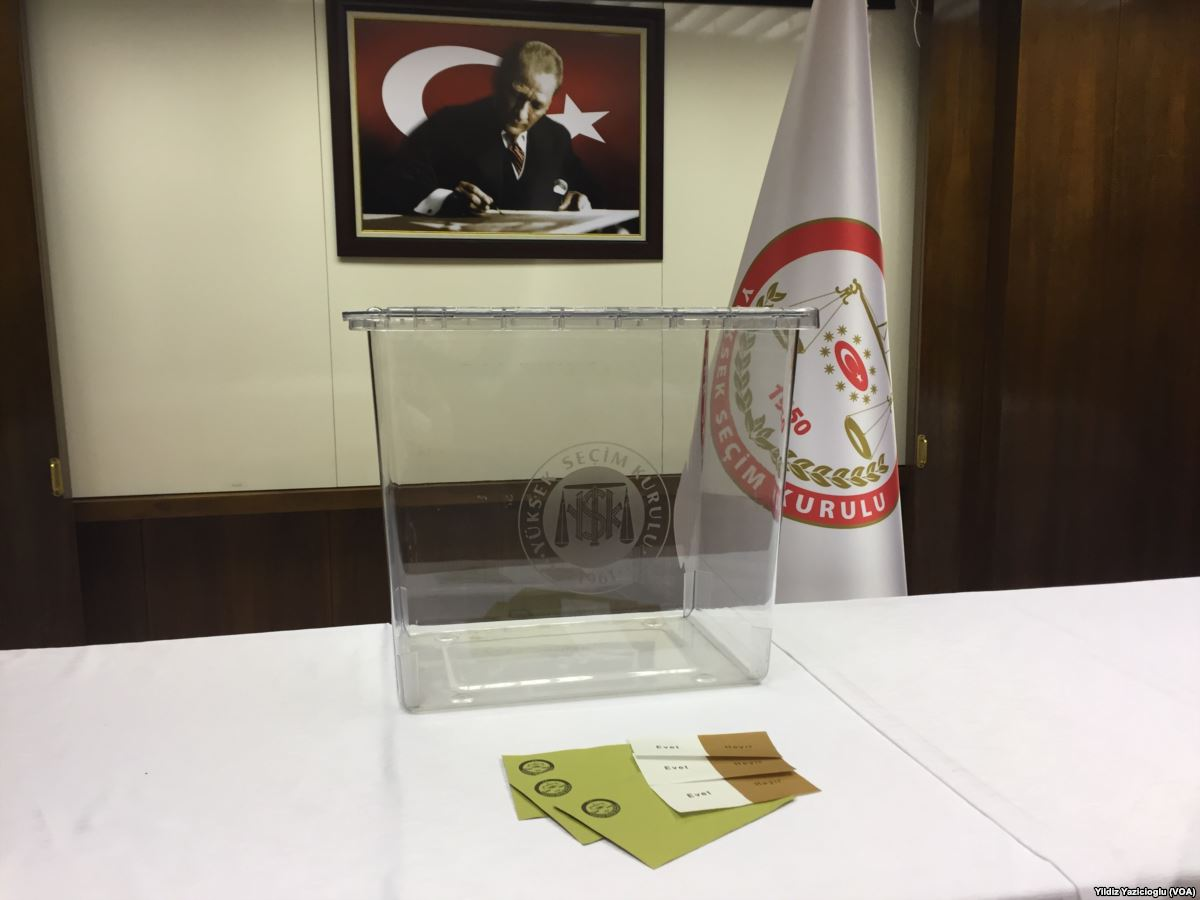
A ballot paper and a transparent ballot box

Since the foundation of the Republic of Turkey in 1923, the country held seven referendums on national level. In the first two referendums (1961 and 1982), new Constitutions were submitted to public approval by military regimes. The remaining five referendums concerned Constitutional reforms and legislative changes proposed by civilian governments in 1987, 1988, 2007, 2010 and 2017.

The processes of submission to the public vote are carried out by the election boards under the management and supervision of the Supreme Election Council.

== Constitutional referendums ==
Amendments to the constitution can be put to referendum by both the legislative branch (parliament) and the executive branch (president).

A referendum on the constitutional amendment is held on the first Sunday after the sixtieth day following the publication of the relevant amendment in the Official Gazette.

In conformity with the conditions set forth in the law, all Turkish citizens over eighteen years of age have the right to vote in elections and to take part in referendums. In accordance with the Law No. 298 on Basic Provisions of Elections and Electoral Registers, citizens in foreign countries can cast their votes starting twenty days before the referendum.

== Presidential election referendums ==
According to article 101 of the Constitution, presidential elections can be turned into a referendum under certain conditions. Turkey elects its presidents with a two-round system. If one of the presidential candidates who gains the right to run for the second round is unable to participate in the election for any reason, the second round shall be conducted by substituting the vacant candidacy in conformity with the ranking in the first round. If only one candidate remains for the second round, this ballot shall be then conducted as a referendum. The presidential candidate receiving the majority of the valid votes shall be elected as president. If that candidate fails to receive the majority of the valid votes in the election, the presidential election are scheduled be renewed.

== Referendum results ==
Voters tended to vote "yes" in the referendums. However, excluding the 1961 and 1982 referendums, which took place under the conditions of a military regime, two of the remaining five referendums did not result in the way the ruling political parties desired. The average rate of acceptance by the public of the proposals brought by the governments in those referendums was 52.6%.

Turkish governments have not achieved easy victories in the referendums. The ANAP governments faced undesirable results in both referendums in 1987 and 1988. The constitutional amendment, which was put to a referendum by the government in 2017, received the approval of the voters by a small margin. It is noteworthy that the differences between "yes" and "no" votes were small, especially in the 1987 and 2017 referendums. Below is the overview of all the referendums.

#	Date	Topic	Voter turnout (%)	Result	
#	Date	Topic	Voter turnout (%)	Voted "Yes" (%)	Voted "No" (%)
1	July 9, 1961	The acceptance of the Constitution of 1961	81.0	61.7	38.2
2	November 7, 1982	The acceptance of the Constitution of 1982	91.3	91.4	8.6
3	September 6, 1987	Lifting the 10 and 5 year political bans established by the 1982 constitution	93.6	50.2	49.8
4	September 25, 1988	The issue of delaying local elections by 1 year	88.8	35.0	65.0
5	October 25, 2007	Vote on 5 proposed amendments to the constitution	67.5	69.0	31.0
6	September 12, 2010	Vote on 26 proposed amendments to the constitution	73.7	57.9	42.1
7	April 16, 2017	Vote on 18 proposed amendments to the constitution	85.4	51.4	48.6

== See also ==
- Politics of Turkey
- Elections in Turkey
- Constitution of Turkey

== Bibliography ==
- Osmanbaşoğlu, Gülsen Kaya; Bekaroğlu, Edip Asaf (2019). Türkiye'de referandumlar (in Turkish). Ankara: Orion Kitabevi. ISBN 978-605-9524-51-3.
