= Parliamentary elections in Turkey =

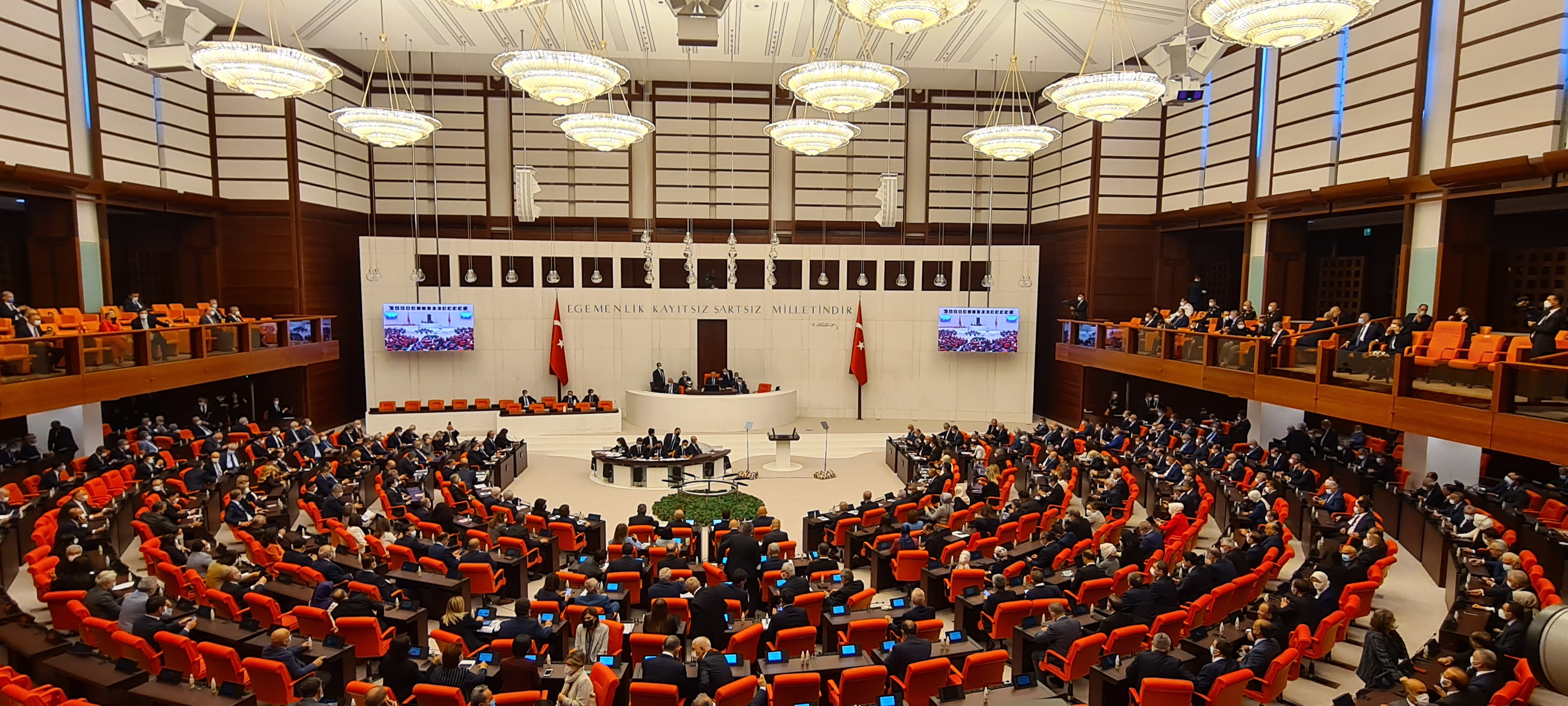
Grand National Assembly, the legislative chamber in Turkey

Parliamentary elections in Turkey determine the composition of the Grand National Assembly for the next five years. The members are elected for a five-year term through a proportional system in 87 multi-member constituencies with closed party lists or as independent candidates.

== Participation ==
=== Age of candidacy ===
The age of candidacy was 30 in the newly established Republic of Turkey. The age of candidacy dropped from 30 to 25 through a constitutional amendment in 2006. Following the 2017 constitutional referendum, it was further lowered to 18.

=== Voting age ===
According to the Constitution of the Ottoman Empire (1876), the voting age was 25. In the newly established Republic of Turkey, the voting age was reduced to 18 due to the decreasing population. The voting age was increased to 22 in 1934, decreased to 21 in 1987, and 18 in 1995.

=== Voter turnout ===
The voter turnout for the average of 18 parliamentary election is 81.4%. Turkey has a high voter turnout rate compared to other democracies. The participation rate in Turkey is also higher than the participation rates in countries where compulsory voting is loosely applied. With the exception of 1960–1970, voter turnout rate in Turkey is above the world average from 1950 to the present in Turkey.

Voter turnout at parliamentary elections
Election year	Registered voters	Total votes	Turnout
1950	8,905,743	7,953,085	89.3
1954	10,262,063	9,095,617	88.6
1957	12,078,623	9,250,949	76.6
1961	12,925,395	10,522,716	81.4
1965	13,679,753	9,748,678	71.3
1969	14,788,552	9,516,035	64.3
1973	16,798,164	11,223,843	66.8
1977	21,207,303	15,358,210	72.4
1983	19,767,366	18,238,362	92.3
1987	26,376,926	24,603,541	93.3
1991	29,979,123	25,157,089	83.9
1995	34,155,981	29,101,469	85.2
1999	37,495,217	32,656,070	87.1
2002	41,407,027	32,768,161	79.1
2007	42,799,303	36,056,293	84.2
2011	52,806,322	43,914,948	83.2
2015	56,608,817	47,507,467	83.9
2015	56,949,009	48,537,695	85.2
2018	59,367,469	51,189,444	86.2
2023	64,145,504	55,835,895	87.0

== Electoral system ==
=== Electoral districts ===
Turkey is split into 87 electoral districts, which elect a certain number of representatives to the Grand National Assembly of Turkey. Electoral district are allocated a certain number of MPs in proportion to their population. The Supreme Electoral Council of Turkey conducts population reviews of each district before an election and adjusts a district's number of seats according to the latest census.

Number of parliamentary constituencies by province and year
Election year		20th century																					21st century						
Election year		'20	'23	'27	'31	'35	'39	'43	'46	'50	'54	'57	'61	'65	'69	'73	'77	'83	'87	'91	'95	'99	'02	'07	'11	'15	'15	'18	'23
#	Total	436	333	335	348	444	470	492	503	477	537	602	450	450	450	450	450	400	450	450	550	550	550	550	550	550	550	600	600
	Province																												
1	Adana	7	3	4	4	8	11	10	10	11	13	16	12	13	13	13	14	12	14	14	17	14	14	14	14	14	14	15	15
2	Adıyaman											5	4	4	4	4	4	4	4	4	5	6	5	5	5	5	5	5	5
3	Afyonkarahisar	8	6	6	7	7	8	8	8	9	9	10	7	7	7	7	6	5	6	6	7	7	7	7	5	5	5	6	6
4	Ağrı	5	2	3	3	4	4	3	3	3	4	5	3	3	3	4	4	4	4	4	5	4	5	5	4	4	4	4	4
68	Aksaray (Note: Aksaray was a province between 1924 and 1933 and was a district of Niğde from 1933 to 1989.)		3	3	4															3	4	4	4	4	3	3	3	4	4
5	Amasya	7	4	3	3	3	3	4	4	4	5	6	4	4	4	5	4	4	4	3	4	4	3	3	3	3	3	3	3
6	Ankara	9	7	8	11	15	16	15	18	18	21	22	21	21	24	26	29	23	26	23	28	28	29	29	31	32	32	36	36
7	Antalya	6	4	5	5	8	8	8	7	7	9	9	7	7	7	7	7	7	8	9	10	12	13	13	14	14	14	16	17
75	Ardahan (Note: Ardahan was a province until 1926 and was a district of Kars from 1926 to 1992.)	2	3																		2	2	2	2	2	2	2	2	2
8	Artvin		1	2	2	10	4	4	5	5	5	5	3	3	3	3	3	3	3	2	3	2	2	2	2	2	2	2	2
9	Aydın	7	6	5	6	7	8	9	8	5	8	10	8	8	7	7	7	6	7	6	8	8	8	8	7	7	7	8	8
10	Balikesir	6	8	10	10	12	12	13	14	12	14	15	11	11	10	9	9	7	8	7	9	9	8	8	8	8	8	9	9
74	Bartın																			2	3	2	2	2	2	2	2	2	2
72	Batman																			3	4	4	4	4	4	4	4	5	5
−	Batum (Note: It was left to Georgia with the Treaty of Moscow in 1921.)	5																											
69	Bayburt																			2	2	2	2	2	1	2	2	1	1
−	Biga (Note: In 1923, it became a district of Çanakkale province.)	3	3																										
11	Bilecik	5	5	4	3	3	5	5	3	3	4	4	2	2	2	2	2	2	2	2	2	2	2	2	2	2	2	2	2
12	Bingöl (Note: Genç until 1926, district of Elazig province between 1927 and 1929 and district of Muş province between 1929 and 1936.)	6	2				2	2	2	2	3	3	2	2	2	2	2	3	3	3	3	3	3	3	3	3	3	3	3
13	Bitlis	7	2	3			2	2	3	2	2	3	2	2	2	2	2	3	3	3	4	4	4	4	3	3	3	3	3
14	Bolu	8	5	6	6	10	8	8	8	7	8	8	6	6	5	5	5	5	5	5	6	5	3	3	3	3	3	3	3
15	Burdur	7	2	2	2	4	3	4	3	3	4	4	3	3	3	3	2	3	3	3	3	3	3	3	3	3	3	3	3
16	Bursa	7	6	9	9	12	12	12	13	11	13	14	11	11	11	11	11	10	11	12	14	16	16	16	18	18	18	20	20
17	Çanakkale			4	5	5	6	6	6	7	8	8	5	5	5	5	4	4	4	4	5	4	4	4	4	4	4	4	4
18	Çankırı	7	4	4	4	8	6	6	5	5	6	6	4	4	4	3	3	3	3	3	3	3	3	3	2	2	2	2	2
−	Çatalca (Note: In 1926, it became a district of Istanbul province.)		1																										
19	Çorum	7	6	5	6	7	8	9	8	8	9	10	7	7	7	7	6	5	6	5	6	5	5	5	4	4	4	4	4
20	Denizli	6	5	6	6	8	9	10	8	7	9	9	7	7	7	6	6	5	6	6	7	7	7	7	7	7	7	8	7
21	Diyarbakır	7	7	6	4	8	8	6	7	7	8	9	7	7	7	7	7	7	8	8	10	11	10	10	11	11	11	12	12
81	Düzce																						3	3	3	3	3	3	3
22	Edirne	5	3	4	4	4	6	5	5	5	6	6	5	4	4	4	4	4	4	4	4	4	4	4	3	3	3	4	4
23	Elazığ	7	6	7	7	6	5	5	5	5	5	6	5	5	5	5	5	4	5	4	5	5	5	5	5	4	4	5	5
−	Ergani (Note: In 1926, it became a district of Diyarbakır province.)	11	3																										
24	Erzincan	5	3	3	3	4	7	5	7	5	5	6	4	4	4	3	3	3	3	3	4	3	3	3	2	2	2	2	2
25	Erzurum	10	7	7	7	12	9	6	11	10	12	13	9	9	9	9	8	7	7	7	8	8	7	7	6	6	6	6	6
26	Eskişehir	7	4	4	4	5	5	5	7	6	7	8	6	6	6	6	5	5	5	5	6	6	6	6	6	6	6	7	6
26	Gaziantep	6	5	6	5	10	7	8	7	7	8	10	7	7	7	8	8	7	8	9	9	9	10	10	12	12	12	14	14
−	Gelibolu (Note: In 1926, it became a district of Çanakkale province.)	1	1																										
28	Giresun		5	5	5	7	7	9	9	8	8	8	6	6	6	6	5	5	5	4	5	5	5	5	4	4	4	4	4
29	Gümüşhane	6	4	5	3	5	5	5	6	7	6	6	4	4	4	4	3	3	3	2	2	2	2	2	2	2	2	2	2
30	Hakkâri (Note: District of Van province between 1933 and 1936.)	6	2	1	1		1	1	1	1	1	1	1	1	1	1	1	2	2	2	2	3	3	3	3	3	3	3	3
31	Hatay						5	5	6	6	8	9	7	7	7	7	8	7	9	8	10	10	10	10	10	10	10	11	11
76	Iğdır																				2	2	2	2	2	2	2	2	2
32	Isparta	6	3	4	4	4	5	5	5	5	5	5	4	4	4	4	4	4	4	4	5	4	5	5	4	4	4	4	4
−	İçel (Note: It merged with Mersin Province in 1933.)	6	2	2	2																								
34	Istanbul	12	23	17	18	20	19	28	30	25	29	39	31	31	33	38	44	36	45	50	61	69	70	70	85	88	88	98	98
35	İzmir	8	11	12	12	14	15	17	15	16	20	22	17	17	18	18	19	16	19	19	24	24	24	24	26	26	26	28	28
46	Kahramanmaraş	8	5	5	4	6	5	5	6	7	7	9	6	6	6	7	7	6	7	7	8	9	8	8	8	8	8	8	8
78	Karabük																				3	3	3	3	2	2	2	3	3
70	Karaman																			2	3	3	3	3	2	2	2	3	3
36	Kars	3	2	6	5	8	10	8	10	10	10	12	9	9	9	8	8	6	6	5	4	3	3	3	3	3	3	3	3
37	Kastamonu	8	8	6	8	9	11	9	11	10	10	10	7	7	6	6	5	4	4	4	5	4	4	4	3	3	3	3	3
38	Kayseri	7	5	6	5	10	8	10	9	9	9	11	8	8	8	8	8	7	8	7	9	8	8	8	9	9	9	10	10
71	Kırıkkale																			3	4	4	4	4	3	3	3	3	3
39	Kırklareli		3	3	3	3	5	5	5	5	5	6	4	4	4	3	3	3	3	3	4	3	3	3	3	3	3	3	3
40	Kırşehir (Note: District of Nevşehir Province between 1954 and 1957.)	7	5	3	3	4	5	4	4	3	5	4	3	3	3	3	3	3	3	3	3	3	3	3	2	2	2	2	2
79	Kilis																				2	2	2	2	2	2	2	2	2
41	Kocaeli	6	6	7	7	10	10	13	10	11	12	5	5	5	4	5	5	5	7	7	9	10	9	9	11	11	11	13	14
42	Konya	10	10	13	14	15	15	15	16	17	19	21	16	16	16	16	16	13	14	13	16	16	16	16	14	14	14	15	15
−	Kozan (Note: In 1926, it became a district of Adana province.)	5	2																										
43	Kütahya	6	8	7	12	11	10	12	10	10	8	8	6	6	6	5	5	5	5	5	6	6	6	6	5	4	4	5	5
−	Lazistan (Note: In 1923, the province of Rize was established in place of the Lazistan Sanjak)	6																											
44	Malatya	11	5	6	6	9	10	11	12	11	12	9	6	6	6	6	6	6	6	6	7	7	7	7	6	6	6	6	6
45	Manisa	9	10	10	11	12	13	12	12	12	12	14	11	11	11	10	10	8	9	9	11	10	10	10	10	9	9	10	10
47	Mardin	6	6	5	3	7	8	7	10	7	7	8	6	6	6	6	6	5	6	5	6	6	6	6	6	6	6	6	6
33	Mersin	7	2	2	3	5	7	8	8	7	8	9	7	7	7	7	8	7	9	9	12	12	12	12	11	11	11	13	13
48	Muğla	11	3	4	4	6	6	6	5	5	6	7	5	5	5	5	4	4	5	5	6	6	6	6	6	6	6	7	7
49	Muş (Note: District of Bitlis province between 1925 and 1929.)	7	3		4	4	2	2	3	2	3	4	3	3	3	3	3	3	4	3	4	4	4	4	4	3	3	4	3
50	Nevşehir											4	3	3	3	3	3	3	3	3	3	3	3	3	3	3	3	3	3
51	Niğde	6	4	4	4	7	7	8	7	8	8	7	5	5	5	5	5	5	5	3	4	3	3	3	3	3	3	3	3
−	Oltu (Note: In 1926, it became a district of Erzurum province.)	2																											
52	Ordu		5	6	6	7	8	8	9	8	9	10	8	8	8	8	7	6	7	6	8	7	7	7	6	5	5	6	6
80	Osmaniye (Note: Cebel-i Bereket Province until 1933, district of Adana Province between 1933 and 1996.)	3	2	5	3																	4	4	4	4	4	4	4	4
53	Rize (Note: Between 1933 and 1936, it merged with Çoruh Province, with the center being Rize.)		6	6	6		6	6	6	6	6	6	4	4	4	4	4	4	4	3	4	3	3	3	3	3	3	3	3
54	Sakarya											8	6	6	6	6	5	5	6	6	7	6	6	6	7	7	7	7	8
55	Samsun	6	3	6	7	9	9	11	10	10	12	14	11	11	11	10	10	8	9	9	11	10	9	9	9	9	9	9	9
56	Siirt	6	2	2	2	6	5	5	4	4	4	5	4	4	4	4	4	4	5	3	3	3	3	3	3	3	3	3	3
57	Sinop	6	4	3	4	6	5	5	5	5	6	6	4	4	4	3	3	3	3	3	3	3	3	3	2	2	2	2	2
58	Sivas	8	7	7	7	11	11	15	12	13	14	15	11	11	10	9	8	7	7	6	7	6	6	6	5	5	5	5	5
−	Siverek (Note: In 1926, it became a district of Şanlıurfa province.)	6	4																										
63	Şanlıurfa	5	6	5	6	7	7	6	7	7	8	9	7	7	6	7	7	5	7	8	9	11	11	11	12	12	12	14	14
−	Şebinkarahisar (Note: It became a district of Giresun province in 1933)	5	4	3	3																								
73	Şırnak																			3	3	3	3	3	4	4	4	4	4
59	Tekirdağ		2	3	4	5	5	6	6	5	6	6	4	4	4	4	4	4	4	4	5	5	5	5	6	6	6	7	8
60	Tokat	7	4	5	6	8	9	8	10	9	9	10	7	7	7	7	7	6	6	6	7	6	7	7	5	5	5	5	5
61	Trabzon	11	7	8	9	9	11	11	12	12	12	12	9	9	9	8	8	6	7	6	8	7	8	8	6	6	6	6	6
62	Tunceli (Note: District of Elazığ between 1926 and 1936.)	6	2				3	2	2	2	3	3	2	2	2	2	2	2	2	2	2	2	2	2	2	2	2	2	1
64	Uşak										4	4	3	3	3	3	3	3	3	3	3	3	3	3	3	3	3	3	3
65	Van	7	3	2	2	3	3	4	3	3	4	5	3	4	4	4	4	4	5	5	6	7	7	7	8	8	8	8	8
77	Yalova																				2	2	2	2	2	2	2	3	3
66	Yozgat	7	4	5	6	7	7	7	8	7	8	9	6	6	6	6	6	5	5	5	6	6	6	6	4	4	4	4	4
67	Zonguldak		4	7	6	10	10	11	9	10	10	12	9	9	9	9	9	8	9	7	6	6	5	5	5	5	5	5	5
#	Total	436	333	335	348	444	470	492	503	477	537	602	450	450	450	450	450	400	450	450	550	550	550	550	550	550	550	600	600

=== Seats allocation ===
Parliamentary seats are allocated according to the d’Hondt method in a party-list proportional representation system. Political parties first need to pass an electoral threshold of 7%. Parties can by-pass this rule by forming an electoral alliance or participate as independents. The electoral threshold was introduced by the military regime after the 1980 coup d'état, in a bid to maintain political stability.

From 1946 onwards, all elections were direct elections. In the elections held between 1946 and 1957, a party block voting system was applied. Under this system, the party that obtained a plurality of votes in a constituency would get all the deputies in that constituency. The system resulted in a landslide victories. For example, the Democrat Party received 58% of the votes in the 1954 election, but won 93% of the seats in the parliament.

Proportional representation was used for the first time after the adoption of the Constitution of 1961. For the elections of 1961, a party-list proportional representation with the D'Hondt method in 67 constituencies was used. In order to receive seats in a constituency, parties needed to receive more votes in that constituency that the Hare quota. It was also the first time that the number of deputies was fixed and determined as 450 seats.

In the 1965 election, the national remnant system was used. In the elections held in 1969, 1973 and 1977, the d'Hondt electoral system was applied without a threshold. A nationwide electoral threshold of 10% and a constituency electoral threshold was introduced following the changes to the law in 1983. In addition to that, a quota system was also used in the 1987 and 1991 elections. From 1995 onwards, only a nationwide electoral threshold is used.

== Campaigning ==
The Law on Basic Provisions regulates the campaign and aims to ensure fair and equitable opportunities for contestants. Turkish campaigns are typically energetic as contestants use a variety of traditional campaigning means such as rallies, campaign stands, posters, banners, party flags, canvassing and vehicles with loudspeakers. Languages other than Turkish as well as sign language are used in the campaigns. According to Turkish Law, it is forbidden to make election propaganda in a foreign country. This law can be circumvented to a certain degree by organizing "informative seminars" instead of "propaganda meetings".

Political parties that received at least three per cent of votes in the last parliamentary elections are entitled to annual public funding on a proportional basis, as well as campaign funding but only for parliamentary elections. Parties also receive funding through membership fees and individual donations. Donations from public legal entities, state and public organizations and foreign sources are not allowed. An individual may donate up to a certain amount annually to a party. There is no ceiling for annual party and campaign-related expenditure. Parties declare their campaign funds solely through annual financial reports. The Constitutional Court audits the reports. Independent candidates declare their campaign funds through personal tax declarations. Possible sanctions for breaches include warnings, imprisonment from three months to three years, monetary fines and dissolution of the party.

== Summary of past elections ==
The list below shows the election results of the multi-party period in Turkey since 1946.

Election	First party	Second party	Third party	Other parties entering the parliament	Cabinets formed
1946	Republican People's Party (İsmet İnönü) ? 395 MPs	Democrat Party (Celal Bayar) ? 66 MPs	National Development Party	Independent; 4 MPs	Peker, I. Saka, II. Saka, Günaltay
1950	Democrat Party (Celal Bayar); 52,67% 415 MPs	Republican People's Party (İsmet İnönü); 39,45% 69 MPs	Nation Party (Yusuf Hikmet Bayur); 3,11% 1 MPs	Independent; 4,76% 2 MPs	I. Menderes, II. Menderes
1954	Democrat Party (Adnan Menderes); 57,61% 502 MPs	Republican People's Party (İsmet İnönü); 35,35% 31 MPs	Republican Nation Party (Osman Bölükbaşı); 4,85% 5 MPs	Independent; 1,53% 3 MPs	III. Menderes, IV. Menderes
1957	Democrat Party (Adnan Menderes); 47,87% 424 MPs	Republican People's Party (İsmet İnönü); 41,09% 178 MPs	Republican Nation Party (Osman Bölükbaşı); 7,13% 4 MPs	Liberty Party; 3,83% 4 MPs	V. Menderes
1961	Republican People's Party (İsmet İnönü); 36,72% 173 MPs	Justice Party (Ragıp Gümüşpala); 34,78% 158 MPs	Republican Villagers Nation Party (Osman Bölükbaşı); 13,95% 54 MPs	New Turkey Party; 13,72% 65 MPs	VIII. İnönü, IX. İnönü, X. İnönü, Ürgüplü
1965	Justice Party (Süleyman Demirel); 52,87% 240 MPs	Republican People's Party (İsmet İnönü); 28,75% 134 MPs	Nation Party (Osman Bölükbaşı); 6,26% 31 MPs	New Turkey Party (19 MPs); Workers' Party of Turkey (14 MPs); Republican Villagers Nation Party (11 MPs); Independent (1 MPs)	I. Demirel
1969	Justice Party (Süleyman Demirel); 46,53% 256 MPs	Republican People's Party (İsmet İnönü); 27,36% 143 MPs	Republican Reliance Party (Turhan Feyzioğlu); 6,57% 15 MPs	Independent (13 MPs); Birlik Partisi (8 MPs); Nation Party (6 MPs); New Turkey Party (6 MPs); Workers' Party of Turkey (2 MPs); Nationalist Movement Party (1 MPs)	II. Demirel, III. Demirel, I. Erim, II. Erim, Melen, Talu
1973	Republican People's Party (Bülent Ecevit); 33,29% 185 MPs	Justice Party (Süleyman Demirel); 29,82% 149 MPs	Democratic Party (Ferruh Bozbeyli); 11,89% 45 MPs	National Salvation Party (48 MPs); Republican Reliance Party (13 MPs); Independent (6 MPs); Nationalist Movement Party (3 MPs); Unity Party (1 MPs)	I. Ecevit, Irmak, IV. Demirel
1977	Republican People's Party (Bülent Ecevit); 41,38% 213 MPs	Justice Party (Süleyman Demirel); 36,87% 189 MPs	National Salvation Party (Necmettin Erbakan); 8,56% 24 MPs	Nationalist Movement Party (16 MPs); Independent (4 MPs); Republican Reliance Party (3 MPs); Democratic Party (1 MPs)	II. Ecevit, V. Demirel, III. Ecevit, VI. Demirel, Ulusu
1983	Motherland Party (Turgut Özal); 45,14% 211 MPs	Populist Party (Necdet Calp); 30,46% 117 MPs	Nationalist Democracy Party (Turgut Sunalp); 23,26% 71 MPs	−	I. Özal
1987	Motherland Party (Turgut Özal); 36,31% 292 MPs	Social Democratic Populist Party (Erdal İnönü); 24,74% 99 MPs	True Path Party (Süleyman Demirel); 19,13% 59 MPs	−	II. Özal, Akbulut, I. Yılmaz
1991	True Path Party (Süleyman Demirel); 27,03% 178 MPs	Motherland Party (Mesut Yılmaz); 24,01% 115 MPs	Social Democratic Populist Party (Erdal İnönü); 20,75% 88 MPs	Welfare Party (62 MPs); Democratic Left Party (7 MPs)	VII. Demirel, I. Çiller, II. Çiller, III. Çiller, II. Yılmaz
1995	Welfare Party (Necmettin Erbakan); 21,38% 158 MPs	Motherland Party (Mesut Yılmaz); 19,65% 132 MPs	True Path Party (Tansu Çiller); 19,18% 135 MPs	Democratic Left Party (76 MPs); Republican People's Party (49 MPs)	Erbakan, III. Yılmaz, IV. Ecevit
1999	Democratic Left Party (Bülent Ecevit); 22,19% 136 MPs	Nationalist Movement Party (Devlet Bahçeli); 17,98% 129 MPs	Virtue Party (Recai Kutan); 15,41% 111 MPs	Motherland Party (86 MPs); True Path Party (85 MPs); Independent (3 MPs)	V. Ecevit
2002	Justice and Development Party (Recep Tayyip Erdoğan); 34,28% 363 MPs	Republican People's Party (Deniz Baykal); 19,41% 178 MPs	True Path Party (Tansu Çiller); 9,54% 0 MPs	Independent; 1,00% 9 MPs	Gül, I. Erdoğan
2007	Justice and Development Party (Recep Tayyip Erdoğan); 46,66% 341 MPs	Republican People's Party (Deniz Baykal); 20,85% 112 MPs	Nationalist Movement Party (Devlet Bahçeli); 14,29% 71 MPs	Independent; 5,24% 26 MPs	II. Erdoğan
2011	Justice and Development Party (Recep Tayyip Erdoğan); 49,83% 327 MPs	Republican People's Party (Kemal Kılıçdaroğlu); 25,98% 135 MPs	Nationalist Movement Party (Devlet Bahçeli); 13,01% 53 MPs	Independent; 6,57% 35 MPs	III. Erdoğan, I. Davutoğlu
2015 June	Justice and Development Party (Ahmet Davutoğlu); 40,87% 258 MPs	Republican People's Party (Kemal Kılıçdaroğlu); 24,95% 132 MPs	Nationalist Movement Party (Devlet Bahçeli); 16,29% 80 MPs	Peoples' Democratic Party; 13,12% 80 MPs	II. Davutoğlu
2015 November	Justice and Development Party (Ahmet Davutoğlu); 49,49% 317 MPs	Republican People's Party (Kemal Kılıçdaroğlu); 25,31% 134 MPs	Nationalist Movement Party (Devlet Bahçeli); 11,90% 40 MPs	Peoples' Democratic Party; 10,76% 59 MPs	III. Davutoğlu, Yıldırım
2018	Justice and Development Party (Recep Tayyip Erdoğan); 42,49% 295 MPs	Republican People's Party (Kemal Kılıçdaroğlu); 22,65% 146 MPs	Peoples' Democratic Party (Sezai Temelli ve Pervin Buldan); 11,70% 67 MPs	Nationalist Movement Party; 11,10% (49 MPs); İYİ Parti; 9,96% (43 MPs)	IV. Erdoğan
2023	Justice and Development Party (Recep Tayyip Erdoğan); 35,62% 268 MPs	Republican People's Party (Kemal Kılıçdaroğlu); 25,35% 169 MPs	Nationalist Movement Party (Devlet Bahçeli); 10,07% 50 MPs	Good Party; 9,69% (43 MPs); Green Left Party; 8,82% (61 MPs); New Welfare Party; 2,80% (5 MPs); Workers' Party of Turkey; 1,76% (4 MPs)	V. Erdoğan

== By-elections ==
By-elections in Turkey are regulated in accordance with Article 7 of the Law on Parliamentary Elections. Accordingly, by-elections are held in case of a vacancy in the membership of the Parliament. According to the constitution, by-elections are held once in each election period, and by-elections cannot be held unless 30 months have passed and 1 year before the parliamentary elections. However, if a province or constituency does not have any members in the Parliament, by-elections are held in that constituency on the first Sunday after 90 days following the vacancy.

== See also ==
- Elections in Turkey
- Presidential elections in Turkey
- Referendums in Turkey
