= 1966 Turkish Senate election =

Senate elections were held in Turkey on 5 June 1966. In this election 52 members of the senate were elected; 50 members for one-third of the senate and two vacant seats.

== Results ==
Party	Votes	%	Seats
Justice Party	1,688,316	56.90	35
Republican People's Party	877,066	29.56	13
Nation Party	157,115	5.29	1
Workers' Party	116,375	3.92	1
New Turkey Party	70,043	2.36	1
Republican Villagers Nation Party	57,367	1.93	1
Independents	980	0.03	0
Total	2,967,262	100.00	52
Total votes	3,072,393	–	
Registered voters/turnout	5,466,284	56.21	
Source: Department of State, Nohlen et al.
