= National remnant =

Method of allocating representative seats following elections

National remnant (Turkish: Ulusal artık or milli bakiye) is an apportionment scheme used in some party-list proportional representation systems that have multi-member electoral districts. The system uses a Largest remainder method to determine some of the seats in each electoral district. However, after the integer part of the seats in each district is allocated to the parties, the seats left unallocated will then be allocated not in each electoral district in isolation, but in a larger division, such as nationwide or in large separate regions that each encompass multiple electoral districts.

== By country ==
=== Austria ===
Elections to the National Council, the lower house of the Austrian parliament, use a three-tiered variant of the national remnant system. Each state is divided into several local constituencies. Seats that aren't allocated at the local level are fed into regional constituencies (corresponding to the states), where the process is repeated. Any seats that still aren't allocated after this goes to the federal constituency, where all remaining seats are assigned.

=== Czechoslovakia ===
The system was used in Czechoslovakia after the Velvet revolution, to elect the Federal Assembly. Unlike the implementations in Italy and Turkey, two separate "national" allocations were done for the Czech Republic and the Slovak Republic, due to the federal nature of the legislature (each of the two republics was represented proportionally to its census population in the lower house, and on an equal basis in the upper house).

=== Germany ===
Map showing the 35 electoral districts and 16 associations (Roman numerals) of the Weimar Republic.

During the Weimar Republic, a three-tiered variant of the national remnant system was used for elections to the Reichstag. The country was divided into 16 electoral associations (sg. Wahlkreisverband), in turn divided into 35 electoral districts (sg. Wahlkreis). Parties got one seat for every 60,000 votes they won in a district, and votes that were not converted into seats were fed into the associations. Here, the process would be repeated, with parties being given another seat for every 60,000 residual votes, followed by another round at the federal level where every 60,000 votes would once again translate into a seat.

=== Italy ===
The system was used in Italy from 1946 to 1993. The Hagenbach-Bischoff quota was used to allocate seats in the districts, with the Hare quota being used to allocate seats at the national level.

=== Turkey ===
The system was used in Turkey during the 1965 Turkish general election. The Hare quota was used to allocate seats both in the districts and at the national level. At the time, Turkey had 67 electoral districts corresponding to the provinces of Turkey. Turkey adopted this system to support smaller parties which were unable to gain enough votes in an electoral district to gain a seat.

Party	Vote percentage	Seat percentage
AP	52.9	53.0
CHP	28,7	29.7
MP	6.3	6.8
YTP	3.7	4.2
TİP	3.0	3.1
CKMP	2.2	2.4

The system was enacted on 13 February 1965 by Act no. 533. The purpose of the system was to equalize the vote percentage and the seat percentage of a party. In the 1965 elections the total number of representatives was 450 and the total number of valid votes was 9,304,563. The nationwide result is shown in the table. (3.2% of votes were received by various independent candidates.) The system was repealed on 20 March 1968 by Act no. 1036.

As seen above, the highest deviation between the vote percentage and the seat percentage of the parties was 1.0%. The election scored a low 2.32 on the Gallagher index, indicating a high level of proportionality. However, in the next election, in which the system was abandoned, the deviation increased. For example, the Worker's Party of Turkey received 2.7% of the votes, but only received 2 seats (which corresponds to 0.4%).

== The system ==
In each electoral district, the total number of votes is divided by a largest remainder quota, such as Hare, Droop, or Imperiali. The number of votes cast for each party is divided by the quota; like in an unmodified largest remainder system, the result for each party will usually consist of an integer part plus a fractional remainder. Each party is first allocated a number of seats equal to their integer. This will generally leave some seats unallocated: these unallocated seats are then allocated at the national level as a whole. The remainders of all the districts are added together to form a national remainder, which serves as a basis for the national allocation.

Unlike the district-based allocation, which must be done using the largest remainder method, the national allocation can be done either using the largest remainder method or using a highest averages method.

== Example ==
District A has 8 representatives. The votes are:

Party A: 200,000
Party B: 150,000
Party C: 75,000
Party D: 25,000

Total number of votes: 450,000

Election quota: 450,000 / 8 = 56,250

The number of MPs for:

Party A: 200,000 / 56,250 = 3 MPs + 31,250 remainder
Party B: 150,000 / 56,250 = 2 MPs + 37,500 remainder
Party C: 75,000 / 56,250 = 1 MP+ 18,750 remainder
Party D: 25,000 / 56,250 = No MP+ 25,000 remainder.

As shown above, 6 of the 8 MPs are directly elected. The contribution of this district to the national level is 112,500 votes, and the remaining two MPs are to be elected by the national remainder.

== See also ==
- Floterial district
- Localized list
- Electoral system of Turkey § Electoral districts
