= 1968 Turkish Senate election =

Senate elections were held in Turkey on 2 June 1968. In this election 53 members of the senate were elected; 50 members for one-third of the senate and three vacant seats.

== Results ==
| Party | Votes | % | Seats |
|---|---|---|---|
| Justice Party | 1,656,802 | 49.86 | 38 |
| Republican People's Party | 899,444 | 27.07 | 13 |
| Reliance Party | 284,234 | 8.55 | 1 |
| Nation Party | 200,737 | 6.04 | 1 |
| Workers' Party | 157,062 | 4.73 | 0 |
| Republican Villagers Nation Party | 66,232 | 1.99 | 0 |
| Independents | 58,317 | 1.76 | 0 |
| Total | 3,322,828 | 100.00 | 53 |
| Total votes | 3,595,976 | – | |
| Registered voters/turnout | 5,420,255 | 66.34 | |
Source: Nohlen et al.
