= 1980 Turkish presidential election =

Unsuccessful election prior to coup

- 1980

The 1980 Turkish presidential election refers to the unsuccessful election process to choose the country's seventh president, to succeed Fahri Korutürk. The first round of the election was held on 12 March 1980. There were 115 unsuccessful rounds until 12 September 1980. The election ended with a coup d'état on that date.

== History ==
According to Hürriyet newspaper's claim on 21 March 1980, Süleyman Demirel (leader of the Justice Party) was going to support İhsan Sabri Çağlayangil, and Bülent Ecevit (leader of the Republican People's Party) was going to support Kemal Güven. However, both didn't put their candidacy in the election.

The election agenda began as incumbent president Fahri Korutürk's 7-year term was scheduled to have finished on 6 April 1980. The election rounds took place in joint sessions, attended by 450 members of the Grand National Assembly of Turkey and 184 members of the Senate of the Republic. According to the 1961 constitution, the winning candidate needed two-thirds of the votes (423 votes) of the total members of parliament in the first two rounds, and simple majority (318 votes) in the remaining rounds. The first round of the election, which was supposed to take place on 22 March 1980, was postponed to 25 March as there were no candidates. Nurettin Yılmaz, an independent politician from Mardin put his candidacy on 25 March. Yılmaz resigned from the candidacy after second round. The Justice Party nominated Sadettin Bilgiç.

After a while, Faik Türün was the Justice Party's (AP) candidate and Muhsin Batur was the Republican People's Party's (CHP) candidate; both were retired army generals who belonged to different factions in the army and both took part in the 1971 Turkish military memorandum. Batur got as high as 299 votes on a round that was alleged to be unfair, and got 303 votes in the 93rd round. Batur resigned from candidacy on 15 May, however became a candidate again on 3 June. The rounds continued even after Batur retired from the senate after completing his term, continuing up to the 124th round on 11 September 1980. İhsan Sabri Çağlayangil, an AP member, was acting president during the five and a half months of elections. In the meantime, none of the candidates reached the simple majority of votes required to become president.

Leaders of the biggest parties in the parliament, Süleyman Demirel and Bülent Ecevit did not agree on whom to be elected. The situation was worsened to the extent that the voters started to write down the names of celebrities like Ajda Pekkan, Bülent Ersoy and Aynur Aydan on the ballot papers after a while. The last round was held on 11 September 1980, and the speaker of the parliament scheduled the next session for 12 September 1980 at 15:00 hours. The next session was called off because of the coup d'état. The coup was headed by Kenan Evren, who later became the 7th president of Turkey in 1982.

== See also ==
- 1982 Turkish constitutional referendum
