= 1988 Turkish constitutional referendum =

- 25 September 1988
- Should the 1989 Turkish local elections be held a year earlier?

Results
Choice	Votes	%
Yes	8,034,933	35.00%
No	14,921,945	65.00%
Valid votes	22,956,878	96.66%
Invalid or blank votes	793,995	3.34%
Total votes	23,750,873	100.00%
Registered voters/turnout	26,739,227	88.82%
- Results by province

A constitutional referendum was held in Turkey on 25 September 1988. The proposed changes to the constitution would have led to the 1989 local elections being held a year early. However, they were voted down, with 65% of voters against. Turnout was 88.8%.

== Results ==
Choice	Votes	%
For	8,034,933	35.00
Against	14,921,945	65.00
Total	22,956,878	100.00
Valid votes	22,956,878	96.66
Invalid/blank votes	793,995	3.34
Total votes	23,750,873	100.00
Registered voters/turnout	26,739,227	88.82

== See also ==
- Politics of Turkey
