= 1961 Turkish presidential election =

Election of Cemal Gürsel

- October 26, 1961
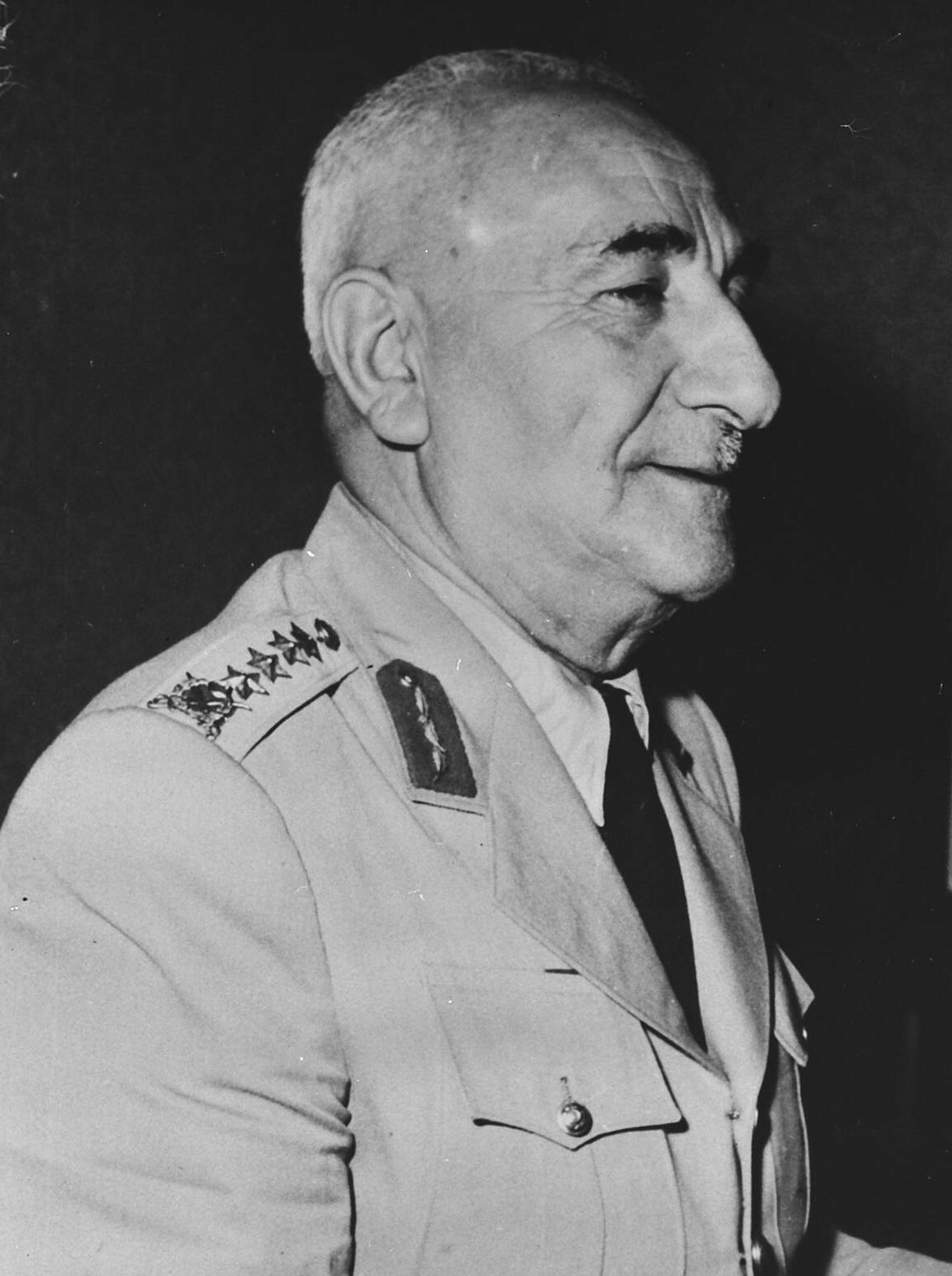
Nominee	Cemal Gürsel
Party	Independent
Popular vote	434
Percentage	68%
President before election
Celâl Bayar
DP
Elected President
Cemal Gürsel
Independent

The 1961 Turkish presidential election was the election to elect the fourth President of Turkey. In the election held on October 26, 1961, 607 out of 638 deputies participated in the voting. The Chairman of the National Unity Committee, Cemal Gürsel, was elected to the Presidency with 434 votes in the first round.

== Election ==
Candidates	Political party	Votes	%
Cemal Gürsel	Independent	434	68
Invalid/blank votes		173	32
Total		607	100
Total MP/turnout		638	95.1

== See also ==
- Ali Fuat Başgil
