= 1965 Turkish general election =

- 10 October 1965

450 seats in the Grand National Assembly 226 seats needed for a majority
- Turnout: 71.26% (▼10.15pp)
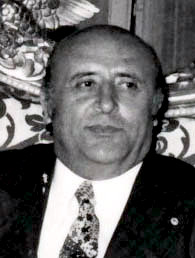

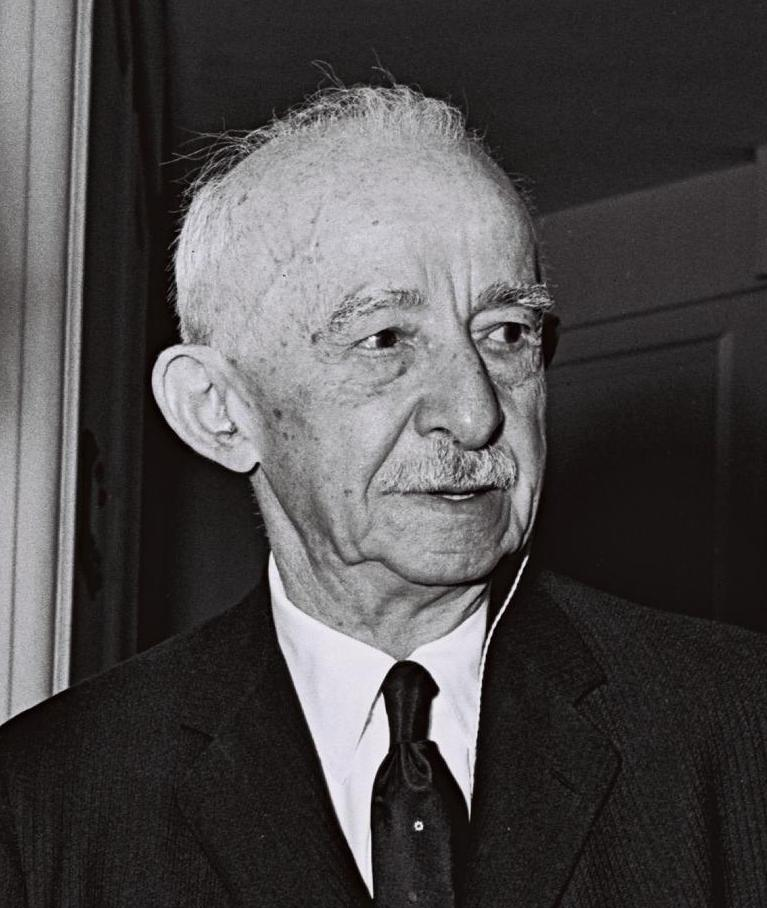

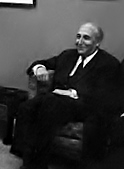
| | First party | Second party | Third party |
|---|---|---|---|
| Leader | Süleyman Demirel | İsmet İnönü | Osman Bölükbaşı |
| Party | AP | CHP | MP |
| Last election | 34.78%, 158 seats | 36.73%, 173 seats | – |
| Seats won | 240 | 134 | 31 |
| Seat change | ▲82 | ▼39 | New |
| Popular vote | 4,921,235 | 2,675,785 | 582,704 |
| Percentage | 52.87% | 28.75% | 6.26% |
| Swing | ▲18.09pp | ▼7.98pp | New |
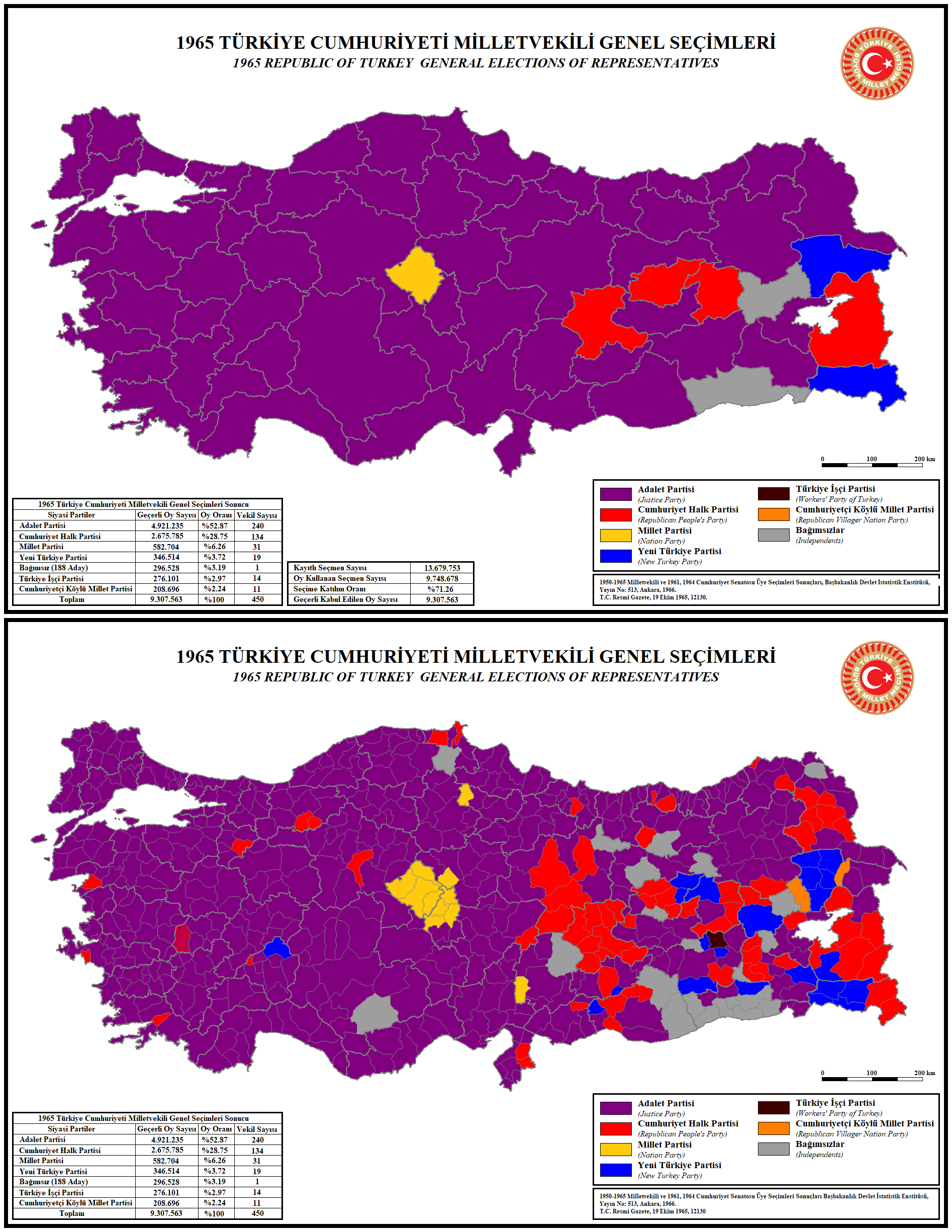
Prime Minister before election
Suat Hayri Ürgüplü
Elected Prime Minister
Süleyman Demirel
AP

General elections were held in Turkey on 10 October 1965. The result was a victory for the Justice Party, which won 240 of the 450 seats. Voter turnout was 71.3%.

== Electoral system ==
The national remnant electoral system was used. This was a two-tier system of party-list proportional representation, with the country divided into 66 districts. In each district, parties were awarded one seat for each Hare quota. Remaining votes and seats were pooled on the national level, where the remaining seats were distributed amongst the parties using the remaining votes using the Hare quota and largest remainder method.

== Results ==
| Party | Votes | % | Seats | +/– |
|---|---|---|---|---|
| Justice Party | 4,921,235 | 52.87 | 240 | +82 |
| Republican People's Party | 2,675,785 | 28.75 | 134 | –39 |
| Nation Party | 582,704 | 6.26 | 31 | New |
| New Turkey Party | 346,514 | 3.72 | 19 | –46 |
| Workers' Party | 276,101 | 2.97 | 14 | New |
| Republican Villagers Nation Party | 208,696 | 2.24 | 11 | –43 |
| Independents | 296,528 | 3.19 | 1 | +1 |
| Total | 9,307,563 | 100.00 | 450 | 0 |
| Valid votes | 9,307,563 | 95.48 | | |
| Invalid/blank votes | 441,115 | 4.52 | | |
| Total votes | 9,748,678 | 100.00 | | |
| Registered voters/turnout | 13,679,753 | 71.26 | | |
Source: Nohlen et al.
