= 1961 Turkish constitutional referendum =

- 9 July 1961

Results
Choice	Votes	%
Yes	6,348,092	61.74%
No	3,933,944	38.26%
Valid votes	10,282,036	99.62%
Invalid or blank votes	39,075	0.38%
Total votes	10,321,111	100.00%
Registered voters/turnout	12,747,901	80.96%
- Results by province

A constitutional referendum was held in Turkey on 9 July 1961. Following the coup d'état the previous year, a new constitution was drawn up to replace the one from 1924. It was approved by 62% of voters, with an 81% turnout.

== Results ==
Choice	Votes	%
For	6,348,092	61.74
Against	3,933,944	38.26
Total	10,282,036	100.00
Valid votes	10,282,036	99.62
Invalid/blank votes	39,075	0.38
Total votes	10,321,111	100.00
Registered voters/turnout	12,747,901	80.96

== See also ==
- Politics of Turkey
