= 1987 Turkish constitutional referendum =

- 6 September 1987
- Should the 10 and 5-year political bans brought by the temporary 4th article of the 1982 constitution be lifted?

Results
Choice	Votes	%
Yes	11,711,461	50.16%
No	11,636,395	49.84%
Valid votes	23,347,856	95.54%
Invalid or blank votes	1,088,965	4.46%
Total votes	24,436,821	100.00%
Registered voters/turnout	26,095,630	93.64%
- Results by province

A constitutional referendum was held in Turkey on 6 September 1987 to amend temporary article 4 of the constitution, which had forbidden the leaders of banned parties (a total of 242 people) from taking part in politics for ten years. The governing Motherland Party (ANAP) agreed to the referendum after a compromise was struck with opposition parties regarding constitutional changes. ANAP campaigned for the "No" vote, while most opposition parties campaigned for the "Yes" vote. The changes were narrowly approved by 50.2% of voters, with a 93.6% turnout.

== Campaign ==
Temporary article 4 of the Turkish constitution was introduced following the 12 September 1980 coup d'état, which saw the outlawing of several political parties. The article forbade 242 people – the leaders of the banned political parties – from being involved in politics for ten years. The referendum was the result of negotiations between the governing Motherland Party (ANAP) and opposition parties.

In the referendum, "Yes" voters used the color blue as their symbol, while "No" voters used orange. The "Blue Color Yes" (Turkish: Mavi Renkli Evet) campaign was led by four party leaders who had been restricted by temporary article 4, from the True Path Party, Democratic Left Party, Nationalist Task Party, and Welfare Party. These parties supported the "Yes" campaign, as did the Social Democratic Populist Party (SHP), despite it not having had any leaders who were affected by temporary article 4. SHP leader Erdal İnönü organized countrywide rallies for the "Yes" campaign.

=== Party positions ===
Choice	Party	Leader	Political orientation	Ref
For	Social Democratic Populist Party	Erdal İnönü	Center-left	
For	Nationalist Task Party	Ali Koç	Far-right	
For	True Path Party	Hüsamettin Cindoruk	Center-right	
For	Democratic Left Party	Rahşan Ecevit	Center-left	
For	Welfare Party	Ahmet Tekdal	Far-right	
Against	Motherland Party	Turgut Özal	Center-right	

== Results ==
The referendum was narrowly approved by 50.2% of voters. Turnout was 93.6%, with 24,436,821 votes cast.

Choice	Votes	%
For	11,711,461	50.16
Against	11,636,395	49.84
Total	23,347,856	100.00
Valid votes	23,347,856	95.54
Invalid/blank votes	1,088,965	4.46
Total votes	24,436,821	100.00
Registered voters/turnout	26,095,630	93.64

== See also ==
- Politics of Turkey
