= 1966 Turkish presidential election =

Election of Cevdet Sunay

- March 28th, 1966
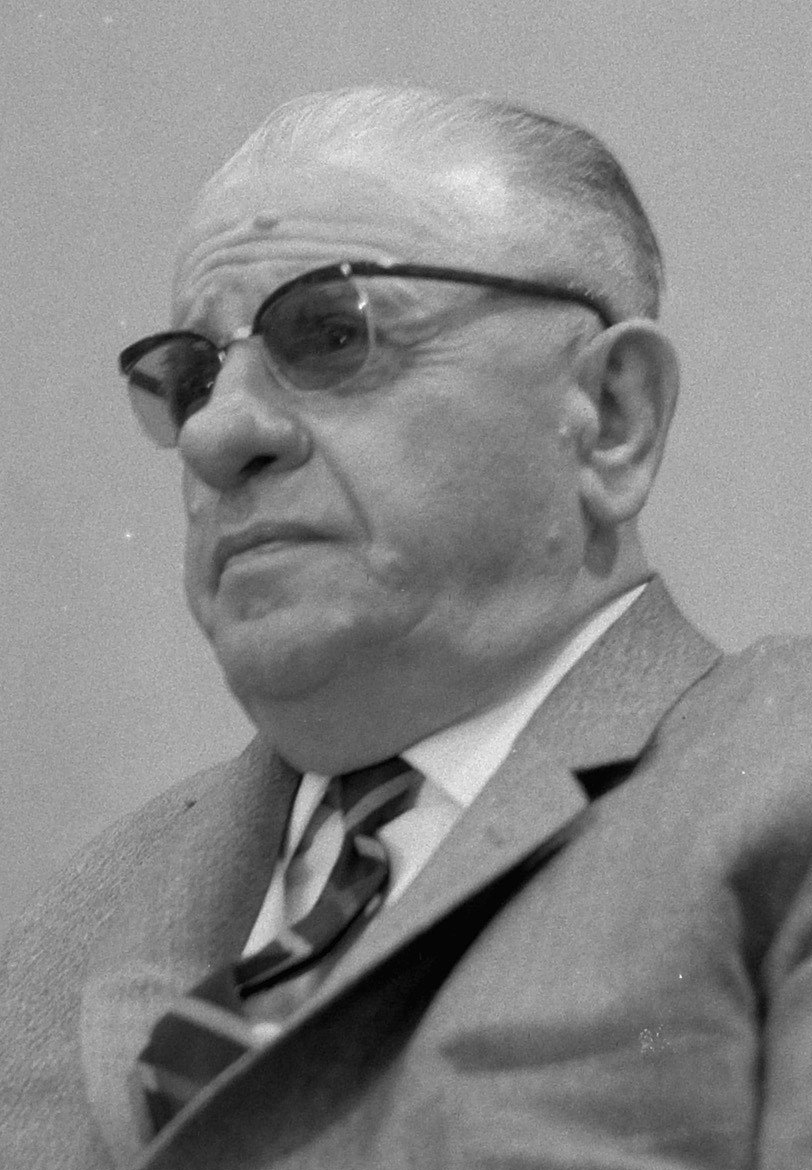

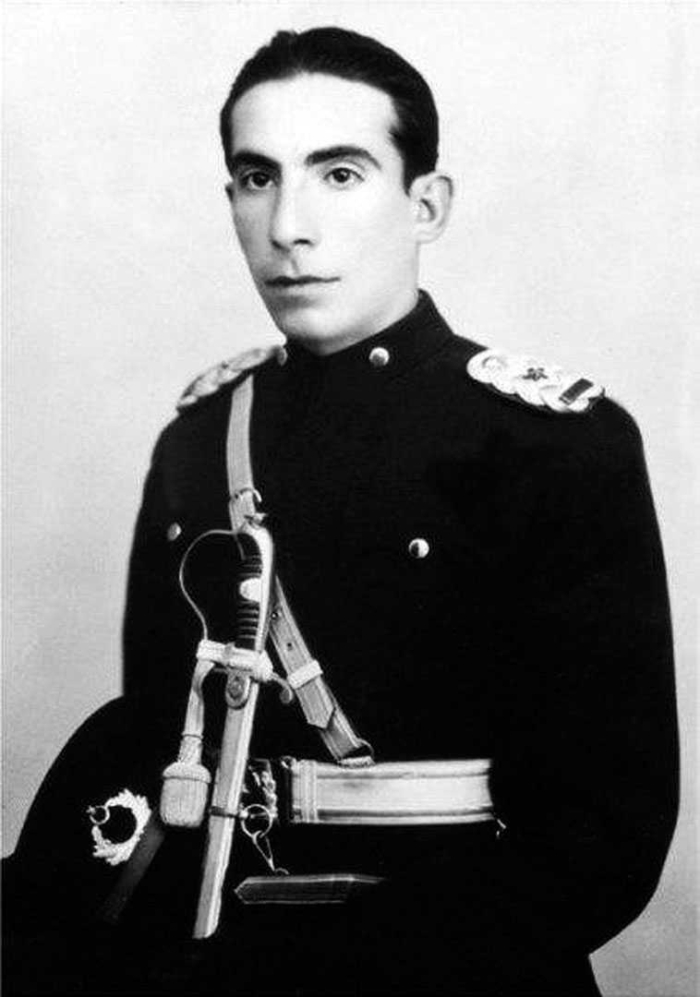
Candidate	Cevdet Sunay	Alparslan Türkeş
Party	Independent	CKMP
Electoral vote	461	11
Percentage	72.7%	1.7%
President before election
Cemal Gürsel
Independent
President
Cevdet Sunay
Independent

The 1966 Turkish presidential election is the presidential election held in the Grand National Assembly of Turkey on March 28, 1966. 532 out of 634 deputies participated in the elections held after the 4th President Cemal Gürsel, was dismissed by the Grand National Assembly of Turkey due to his health problems. Cevdet Sunay, Chief of General Staff of the Turkish Armed Forces, was elected to the presidency with 461 votes in the first round.

== Election ==
Candidates	Political party	Votes	%
Cevdet Sunay	Independent	461	72.7
Alparslan Türkeş	CKMP	11	1.7
Invalid/blank votes		71	17.3
Total		532	100
Total MP/turnout		634	83.9
