= 1943 Turkish presidential election =

Second re-election of İsmet İnönü

- 8 March 1943
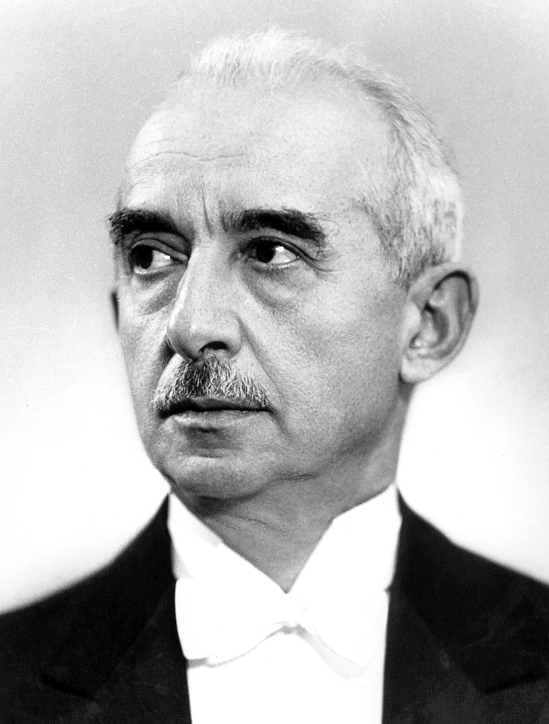
| Nominee | İsmet İnönü |
| Party | CHP |
| MP votes | 435 |
President before election
İsmet İnönü
CHP
Elected President
İsmet İnönü
CHP

The 1943 Turkish presidential election was the presidential election held in the Grand National Assembly of Turkey on 8 March 1943, in which 435 of 455 deputies participated. The current President İsmet İnönü was re-elected as president in the 1st round.

== Results ==
| Candidate | Party | Votes | % |
|---|---|---|---|
| İsmet İnönü | Republican People's Party | 435 | 100.00 |
| Total | | 435 | 100.00 |
| Registered voters/turnout | | 455 | – |
