= 2007 Turkish constitutional referendum =

- 21 October 2007
- Constitutional reforms, including: electing the president by popular vote instead of by parliament; reducing the presidential term from seven years to five; allowing the president to stand for re-election for a second term; reducing the parliamentary term from five years to four; reducing the quorum of lawmakers needed for parliamentary decisions from 67% to 34%.

Results
Choice	Votes	%
Yes	19,422,714	68.95%
No	8,744,947	31.05%
Valid votes	28,167,661	97.74%
Invalid or blank votes	651,435	2.26%
Total votes	28,819,096	100.00%
Registered voters/turnout	42,690,252	67.51%
- Results by province
- Source: Turkish Supreme Election Board (YSK)

A constitutional referendum on electoral reform was held in Turkey on 21 October 2007. After the aborted attempt to elect the next president in May 2007, the government of Recep Tayyip Erdoğan introduced substantial electoral reforms in parliament which were then passed with the votes of Erdoğan's Justice and Development Party and the opposition Motherland Party.

== Background ==
The President of Turkey, according to the 1982 constitution, was elected by the Grand National Assembly of Turkey. This was due to happen in late April and early May 2007 onwards (in at most four rounds of voting to be held on 27 April 2007, 6 May 2007 and later), before Ahmet Necdet Sezer's term expired on 16 May 2007. However, the election failed after the constitutional court declared the first round of voting invalid, on the grounds that a quorum of two thirds was necessary. It was not reached because of a boycott by opposition parties.

=== Resolution ===
The reforms proposed consisted of the following:

- electing the president by popular vote instead of by parliament;
- reducing the presidential term from seven years to five;
- allowing the president to stand for re-election for a second term;
- holding parliamentary elections every four years instead of five;
- reducing the quorum of lawmakers needed for parliamentary decisions to 184.

Parliament first passed the amendments on May 11, but Sezer vetoed the bill over concerns that the change could pit a president with a strong popular mandate against the prime minister and cause instability. AKP legislators, who currently choose the president in a parliamentary vote, voted 370-21 in favor of the same measure (without changing a word), which demands presidential election by the public.

Constitutional Amendment:	Seats		Votes May 11	Votes May 31
Justice and Development Party (AKP)	352			352
Republican People's Party (CHP)	149			0
Motherland Party (ANAP)	20	24		2
Democrat Party(DP)	-	24		-
True Path Party (DYP)	4	24		0
Social Democratic People's Party (SHP)	1			0
People's Ascent Party (HYP)	1			0
Young Party (GP)	1			0
Independents Bağımsız	13			11
Total Seats/ Total (Yes)	541		376	370
Total (No)			(165 boycotted)	21 - (150 boycotted)
Note that the distribution of seats has changed since the latest elections in 2002.
On June 2, 2007, DYP will change its name to Democrat Party (DP), and ANAP would merge into DP. Eventually, DYP became DP, however, ANAP did not merge into DP, but agreed to support it in the coming parliamentary elections.

The President of Turkey is unable to veto a bill a second time, but he could refer it to a referendum for decision. On June 4, opposition lawmakers also said they could seek a cancellation of the vote by the Constitutional Court on the grounds of procedural flaws.

=== Constitutional Court ===
Sezer referred it for a referendum on 15 June 2007. However, at the same time he stated he would ask the Constitutional Court to invalidate the parliamentary vote due to procedural errors. Sezer's strong opposition reportedly comes from fears that a president with a strong popular mandate might produce a deadlock when in disagreement with the prime minister (a situation referred to as cohabitation). The court ruled in early July that the reforms were indeed valid, so the referendum took place as planned.

Furthermore, Sezer vetoed another law, which would have made it possible to hold the constitutional referendum on 22 July 2007 instead of in October, making the reform increasingly unlikely to take place before the election.

== Campaign ==
=== Positions ===
Erdoğan claims that the position of president is political and it should be elected by the public not by the parties. "How can those who see the election of the Turkish president by popular vote as a problem for the regime ask votes from the people?" asked Erdoğan.

The Republican People's Party accused Erdoğan of acting with "a sense of vengeance" for having failed first to secure his then Gul's election to this position and now at the expense of creating a "degenerated parliamentary system", he tries to secure a new path to reach his goal. Deniz Baykal said it would mount a legal challenge to this ideology. Baykal claims that position of president in Turkey is a non-partisan, over political concerns and designed as an oversight. Presidents job description and powers demands that the policies originated from this position should reflect a balance, which all the parties can trust [or at least agree on]. Because of this balancing act, according to Baykal, it is very important to create [he says protect] the neutral point [through reaching an agreement at the parliament among the parties] of the president and prevent domination of a single party [which might generate PM and President at the same time] and control the every mechanism of the Turkish political system.

=== Debates ===
Since the original text of the referendum question called for "all presidents starting with the 11th" to be elected by popular vote, the incumbent (eleventh) president would have had to stand down and have his election reconfirmed by popular vote; therefore, the AKP amended the text before the referendum, in a parliamentary session on 16 October 2007.

== Results ==
Sixty percent of all voters participated in the referendum. Nearly seventy percent of the participants supported the constitutional changes. The referendum saw considerable support in the eastern regions, where support reached up to the ninety percent. On the other hand, western regions generally took a more critical standing. The constitutional changes were rejected in the important provinces of İzmir and Edirne. Citizens of five other provinces — Muğla, Kırklareli, Tunceli, Tekirdağ and Aydın — also rejected the changes. Those seven regions are well known for being strongholds of the secular left, which was opposed to the changes.

Turkish constitutional referendum, 2007
Choice	Votes	%
For	19,403,987	68.95
Against	8,738,794	31.05
Total	28,142,781	100.00
Valid votes	28,142,781	97.74
Invalid/blank votes	651,435	2.26
Total votes	28,794,216	100.00
Registered voters/turnout	42,665,149	67.49

== Opinion polls ==
A poll from mid-July saw a vast majority of voters in favour of the change.

== See also ==
- Politics of Turkey
- 2007 Turkish general election
- 2010 Turkish constitutional referendum
- 2017 Turkish constitutional referendum
