= 1957 Turkish presidential election =

Second re-election of Celâl Bayar

- 1 November 1957
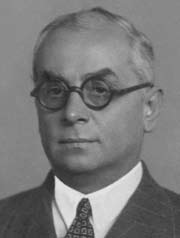
Nominee	Celâl Bayar
Party	DP
Popular vote	413
Percentage	100%
President before election
Celâl Bayar
DP
Elected President
Celâl Bayar
DP

Indirect presidential elections were held in Turkey on November 1, 1957 immediately after the 1957 general elections on October 27. Members of the Grand National Assembly re-elected Celâl Bayar as president. In the same year the 1957 Turkish general election were held.

== Results ==
Candidate	Party	Votes	%
Celâl Bayar	Democrat Party	413	100.00
Total		413	100.00
Total votes		413	–
Registered voters/turnout		610	67.70
