= 1946 Turkish presidential election =

Third re-election of İsmet İnönü

- 5 August 1946
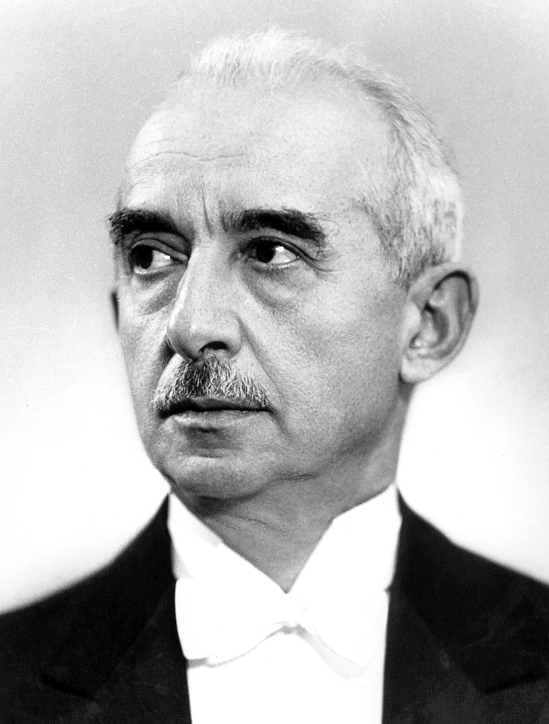

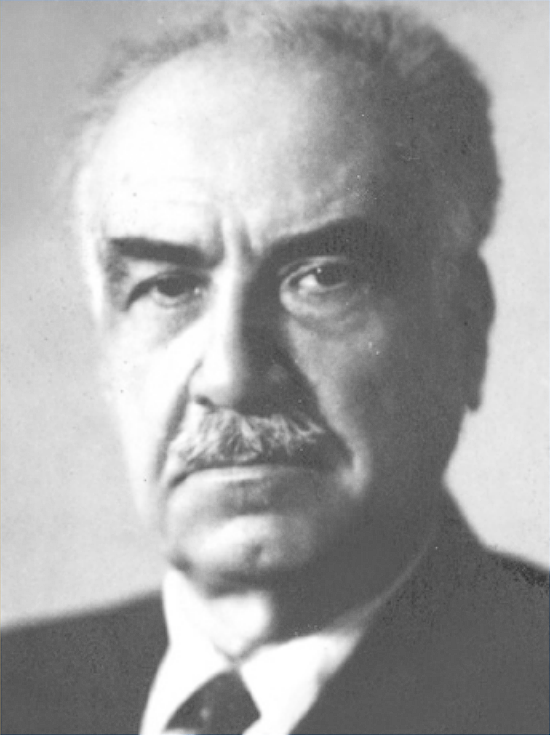

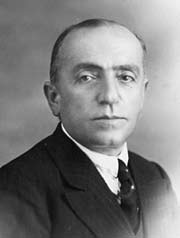
Nominee	İsmet İnönü	Fevzi Çakmak	Yusuf Kemal Tengirşenk
Party	CHP	DP	DP
MP votes	388	59	2
Percentage	86.4%	13.1%	0.4%
President before election
İsmet İnönü
CHP
Elected President
İsmet İnönü
CHP

The 1946 Turkish presidential election is the presidential election held in the Grand National Assembly of Turkey on 5 August 1946. For the first time, the elections were competed by more than one candidate and the current President İsmet İnönü won again in the first round with 388 votes.

== Results ==
Candidate	Party	Votes	%
İsmet İnönü	Republican People's Party	388	86.41
Fevzi Çakmak	Democrat Party	59	13.14
Yusuf Kemal Tengirşenk	Democrat Party	2	0.45
Total		449	100.00
Valid votes		449	96.56
Invalid/blank votes		16	3.44
Total votes		465	100.00
Registered voters/turnout		465	100.00
