= 1935 Turkish presidential election =

Third re-election of Mustafa Kemal Atatürk

- 1 March 1935
Nominee	Mustafa Kemal Atatürk
Party	CHP
MP votes	386
President before election
Mustafa Kemal Atatürk
CHP
Elected President
Mustafa Kemal Atatürk
CHP

The 1935 Turkish presidential election is the presidential election held in the Grand National Assembly of Turkey on 1 March 1935. 386 MPs participated in the elections. The current President Mustafa Kemal Atatürk was unanimously re-elected President in the first round.

== Results ==
Candidate	Party	Votes	%
Mustafa Kemal Atatürk	Republican People's Party	386	100.00
Total		386	100.00
Registered voters/turnout		399	–
