= 2000 Turkish presidential election =

Election of Ahmet Necdet Sezer

- 27 April 2000 (first round); 1 May 2000 (second round); 5 May 2000 (third round)

550 members of the Grand National Assembly 276 votes needed to win
- Turnout: 96.91% ▲5.35pp
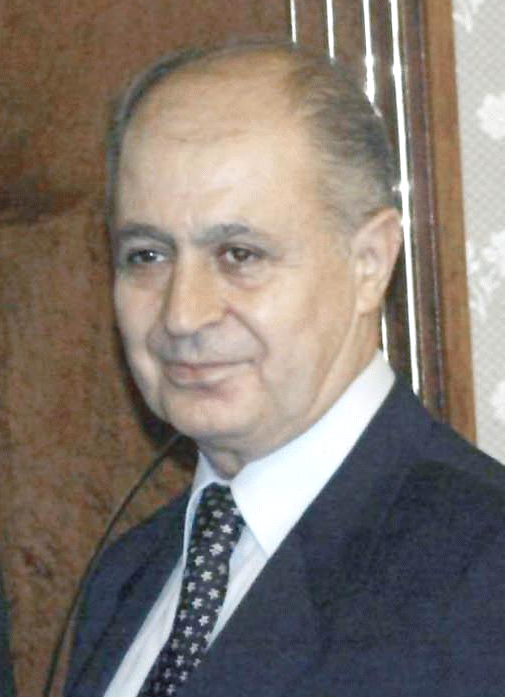

Candidate	Ahmet Necdet Sezer	Nevzat Yalçıntaş	Sadi Somuncuoğlu
Party	Independent	FP	MHP
Electoral vote	330	113	43
Percentage	63.83%	21.86%	8.32%
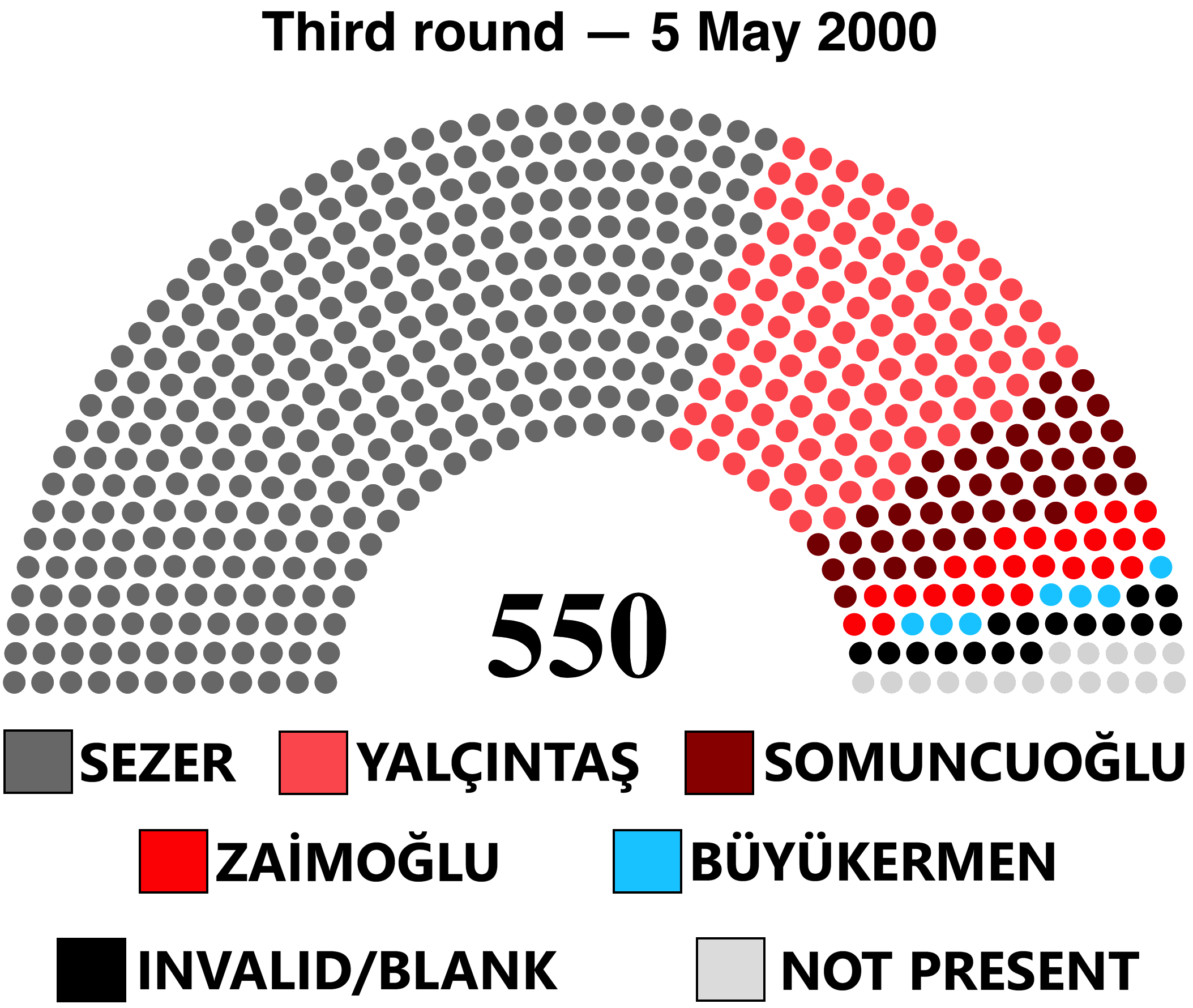
President before election
Süleyman Demirel
DYP
Elected President
Ahmet Necdet Sezer
Independent

Indirect presidential elections were held in Turkey on 27 April 2000 followed by a second round vote on 1 May and a third on 5 May. It occurred at the end of 9th president Süleyman Demirel's seven-year term in office. There was a small effort to convert Turkey's presidential system into two terms of five years each, which would have given Demirel an additional three years, but this proposal never found widespread support.

In the months leading to the vote, each of the five largest parliamentary parties informally endorsed their own candidates. However, with their no party with a defining majority, a neutral compromise candidate was sought and eventually found in the form of Ahmet Necdet Sezer, former president of the Turkey's Constitutional Court. Sezer was endorsed by the leaders of the governing Democratic Left, Nationalist Movement and Motherland parties, as well as the leaders of the opposition Virtue and True Path parties.

A number of MPs broke from party lines to nominate themselves. Among them was parliament speaker and former prime minister Yıldırım Akbulut, who was unable to win popular support and withdrew after the second round.

== Electoral system ==
The presidential vote is held in parliament by secret ballot. A candidate requires a two-thirds majority - or 367 votes - to be elected in the first two rounds. If there is no clear winner before the third round, the winning threshold is dropped to a simple majority, or 276 votes. If there is still no winner, the two candidates with the most votes from the third round progress to a runoff election, where the simply majority rule still applies. In the event of no clear winner among the two, the Turkish constitution states that a snap general election must be called to overcome the parliamentary deadlock.

== Results ==
Vecdi Gönül of the Virtue Party withdrew when a cross-party compromise candidate was found in Sezer; however, he Still received five votes in the first ballot. Gönul Saray Alphan and Turhan İmamoğlu of Democratic Left Party had stated they would run but both withdrew their candidacies before the first ballot.

Candidate	Party	First round		Second round		Third round	
Candidate	Party	Votes	%	Votes	%	Votes	%
Ahmet Necdet Sezer	Independent	281	54.04	314	59.58	330	63.83
Nevzat Yalçıntaş	Virtue Party	61	11.73	66	12.52	113	21.86
Sadi Somuncuoğlu	Nationalist Movement Party	58	11.15	32	6.07	43	8.32
Rasim Zaimoğlu	True Path Party	7	1.35	3	0.57	24	4.64
Mehmet Mail Büyükerman	Democratic Left Party	3	0.58	2	0.38	7	1.35
Yıldırım Akbulut	Motherland Party	56	10.77	88	16.70		
Doğan Güreş	True Path Party	35	6.73	22	4.17		
Ahmet İyimaya	True Path Party	10	1.92				
Agah Oktay Güner	Motherland Party	5	0.96				
Oğuz Aygün	Democratic Left Party	4	0.77				
Total		520	100.00	527	100.00	517	100.00
Valid votes		520	98.11	527	99.06	517	97.00
Invalid/blank votes		10	1.89	5	0.94	16	3.00
Total votes		530	100.00	532	100.00	533	100.00
Registered voters/turnout		550	96.36	550	96.73	550	96.91
Source: Grand National Assembly

== See also ==
- 2007 Turkish presidential election
