= 1982 Turkish constitutional referendum =

- 7 November 1982

Results
Choice	Votes	%
Yes	17,215,559	91.37%
No	1,626,431	8.63%
Valid votes	18,841,990	99.77%
Invalid or blank votes	43,498	0.23%
Total votes	18,885,488	100.00%
Registered voters/turnout	20,690,914	91.27%
- Results by province

A constitutional referendum was held in Turkey on 7 November 1982. Voters approved the new constitution and the presidency of Kenan Evren with a 91.37% "yes" vote, with a 91% turnout.

== Background ==
In 1980 the Grand National Assembly was scheduled to elect a new President to replace Fahri Korutürk. However, the parties were unable to agree on a candidate, and on 12 September 1980, the Turkish Armed Forces led by Kenan Evren staged a coup d'état, dissolved the Grand National Assembly and started ruling the country through the National Security Council.

The NSC set up a Consultative Assembly and appointed all 160 members. Political parties were shut down, and those who had been members of parties were excluded from the Assembly. It worked from 23 November 1981 and 17 July 1982 to draw up the new constitution, which would replace the 1961 document. In one of the rallies that he held to promote the new constitution, Evren claimed that the 1961 constitution "hadn't been able to set the boundaries for liberties properly, and establish legal responsibilities as a counterpart to liberties". In a 2007 interview, Evren claimed that the 1961 constitution was "luxurious" for Turkey at the time.

== New constitution ==
One of the transitional provisions of the constitution named Evren as President until 1989. The constitution also banned civil society organisations from political activity, whilst political parties were banned from working with civil society organisations, including trade unions. The Army was given a majority in the National Security Council, which was also deemed to be superior to the cabinet.

== Results ==
Choice	Votes	%
For	17,215,559	91.37
Against	1,626,431	8.63
Total	18,841,990	100.00
Valid votes	18,841,990	99.77
Invalid/blank votes	43,498	0.23
Total votes	18,885,488	100.00
Registered voters/turnout	20,690,914	91.27
Source: Nohlen et al.
