= 1931 Turkish presidential election =

Second re-election of Mustafa Kemal Atatürk

- 4 May 1931
| Nominee | Mustafa Kemal Atatürk |
| Party | CHP |
| MP votes | 289 |
President before election
Mustafa Kemal Atatürk
CHP
Elected President
Mustafa Kemal Atatürk
CHP

The 1931 Turkish presidential election is the presidential election held in the Grand National Assembly of Turkey on 4 May 1931. 289 MPs participated in the elections. The current President Mustafa Kemal Atatürk was unanimously re-elected President in the first round.

== Results ==
| Candidate | Party | Votes | % |
|---|---|---|---|
| Mustafa Kemal Atatürk | Republican People's Party | 289 | 100.00 |
| Total | | 289 | 100.00 |
| Registered voters/turnout | | 317 | – |
