= 1993 Turkish presidential election =

Election of Süleyman Demirel

- 8 May 1993 (first round); 12 May 1993 (second round); 16 May 1993 (third round)

450 members of the Grand National Assembly 226 votes needed to win
- Turnout: 91.56% ▲28.23pp
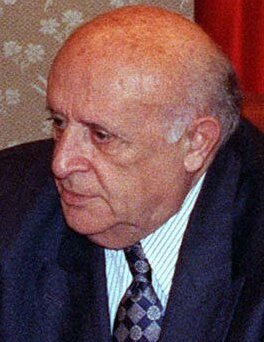

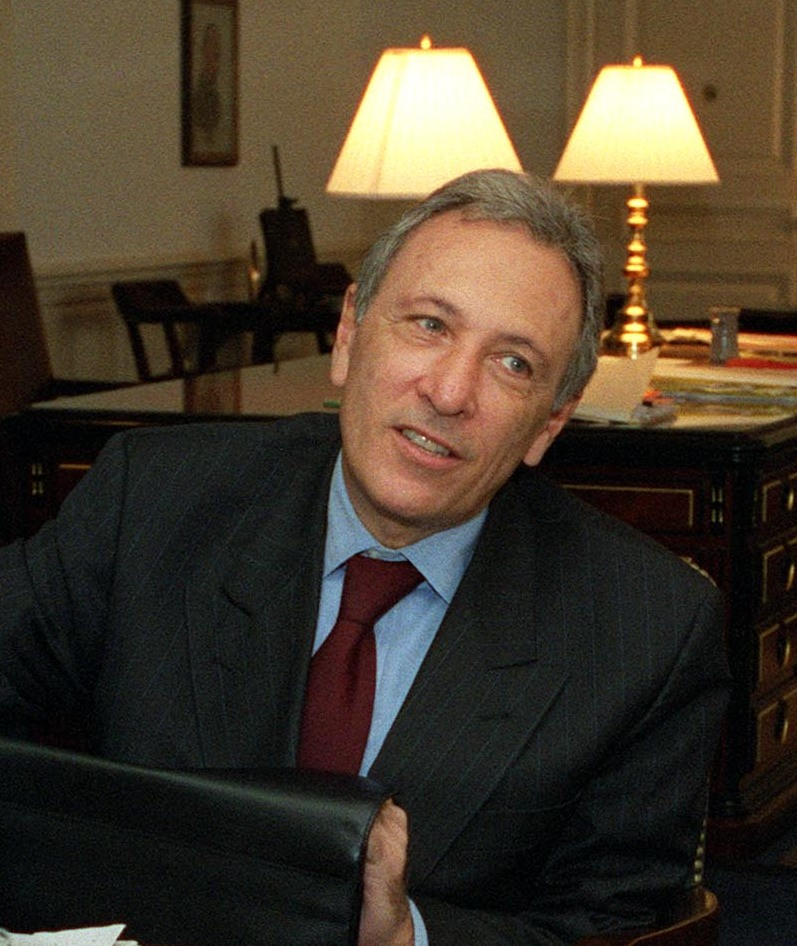
Candidate	Süleyman Demirel	Kâmran İnan
Party	DYP	ANAP
Electoral vote	244	94
Percentage	59.22%	22.82%
Candidate	Lütfi Doğan	İsmail Cem
Party	RP	CHP
Electoral vote	47	27
Percentage	11.41%	6.55%
President before election
Hüsamettin Cindoruk
DYP
Elected President
Süleyman Demirel
DYP

Indirect presidential elections were held in Turkey in May 1993 to elect the country's ninth president, who would succeed Turgut Özal who had recently died. The candidate of DYP was Süleyman Demirel who was also supported by SHP. In the first and second rounds, the ruling party DYP was unsuccessful in electing its candidate, Süleyman Demirel. Finally, in the third round, Süleyman Demirel was elected as the ninth President of Turkey.

== Electoral system ==
The presidential vote is held in parliament by secret ballot. A candidate requires a two-thirds majority - or 300 votes - to be elected in the first two rounds. If there is no clear winner before the third round, the winning threshold is dropped to a simple majority, or 226 votes. If there is still no winner, the two candidates with the most votes from the third round progress to a runoff election, where the simply majority rule still applies. In the event of no clear winner among the two, the Turkish constitution states that a snap general election must be called to overcome the parliamentary deadlock.

== Results ==
Candidate	Party	First round		Second round		Third round	
Candidate	Party	Votes	%	Votes	%	Votes	%
Süleyman Demirel	True Path Party	234	58.50	235	58.17	244	59.22
Kâmran İnan	Motherland Party	95	23.75	95	23.51	94	22.82
Lütfi Doğan	Welfare Party	46	11.50	49	12.13	47	11.41
İsmail Cem	Republican People's Party	25	6.25	25	6.19	27	6.55
Total		400	100.00	404	100.00	412	100.00
Registered voters/turnout		450	–	450	–	450	–
