= 1939 Turkish presidential election =

First re-election of İsmet İnönü

- 3 April 1939
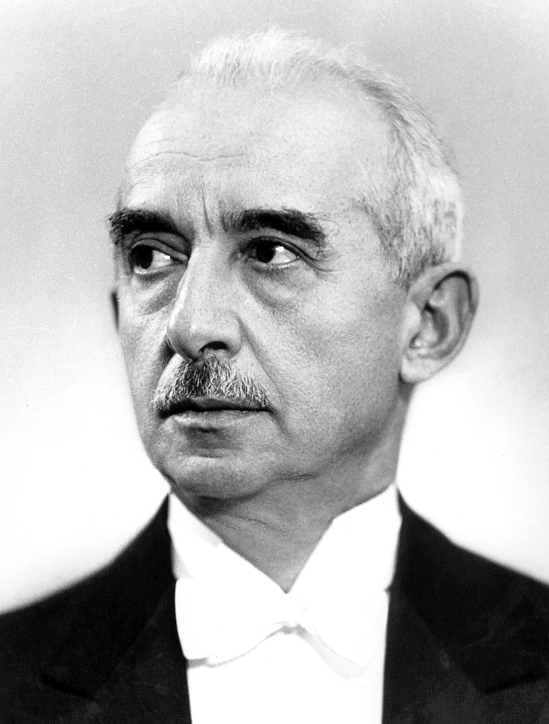
Nominee	İsmet İnönü
Party	CHP
MP votes	413
President before election
İsmet İnönü
CHP
Elected President
İsmet İnönü
CHP

The 1939 Turkish presidential election is the presidential election held in the Grand National Assembly of Turkey on 3 April 1939. 413 MPs participated in the elections. The current President İsmet İnönü was unanimously re-elected President in the first round.

== Results ==
Candidate	Party	Votes	%
İsmet İnönü	Republican People's Party	413	100.00
Total		413	100.00
