= 1954 Turkish presidential election =

First re-election of Celâl Bayar

- 14 May 1954
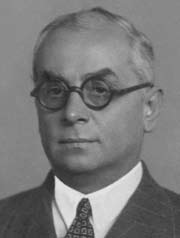

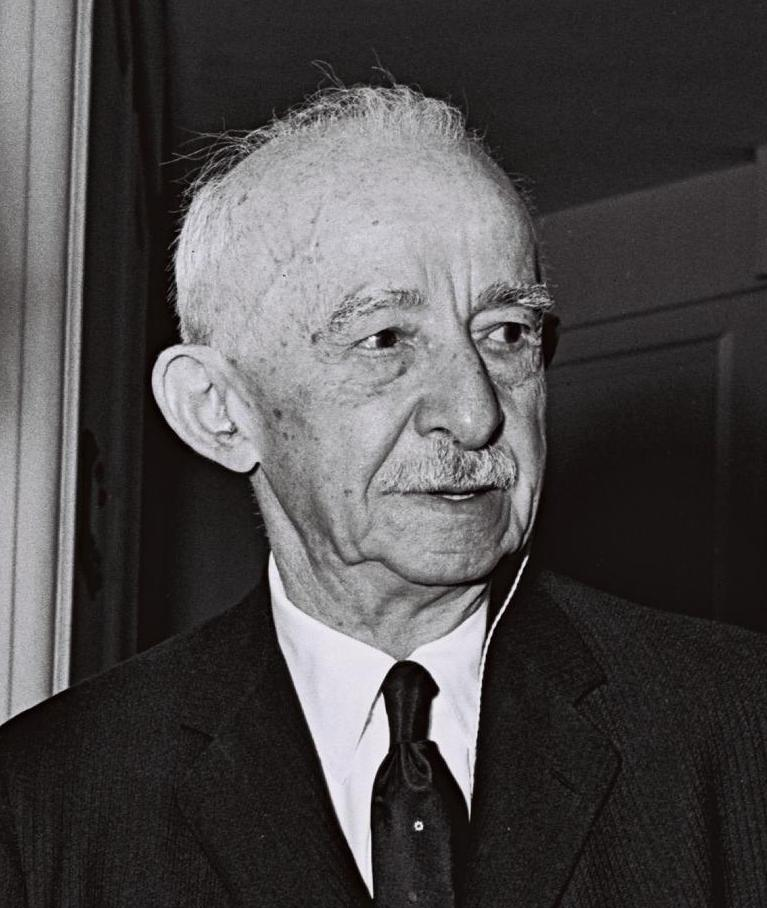
Nominee	Celâl Bayar	İsmet İnönü
Party	DP	CHP
Popular vote	486	27
Percentage	94.74%	5.26%
President before election
Celâl Bayar
DP
Elected President
Celâl Bayar
DP

Indirect presidential elections were held in Turkey on 14 May 1954. 513 out of 541 members of the Grand National Assembly participated in the elections, which were held as required by law immediately after the election of the members of the tenth parliament. Incumbent president Celâl Bayar was re-elected to the presidency with 486 votes in the first round. In the same year the 1954 Turkish general election were held.

== Results ==
Candidate	Party	Votes	%
Celâl Bayar	Democrat Party	486	94.74
İsmet İnönü	Republican People's Party	27	5.26
Total		513	100.00
Valid votes		513	94.82
Invalid/blank votes		28	5.18
Total votes		541	100.00
Registered voters/turnout		541	100.00
