= 1989 Turkish presidential election =

Election of Turgut Özal

- 31 October 1989 (third round)

450 members of the Grand National Assembly 226 votes needed to win
- Turnout: 63.33%
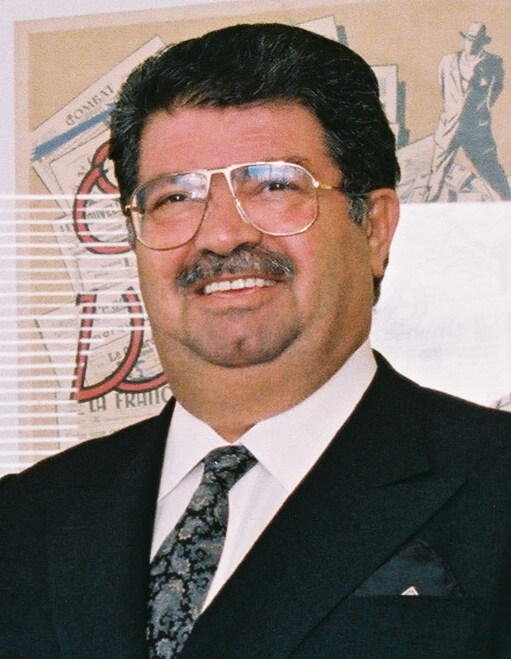

Candidate	Turgut Özal	Fethi Çelikbaş
Party	ANAP	ANAP
Electoral vote	263	14
Percentage	94.95%	5.05%
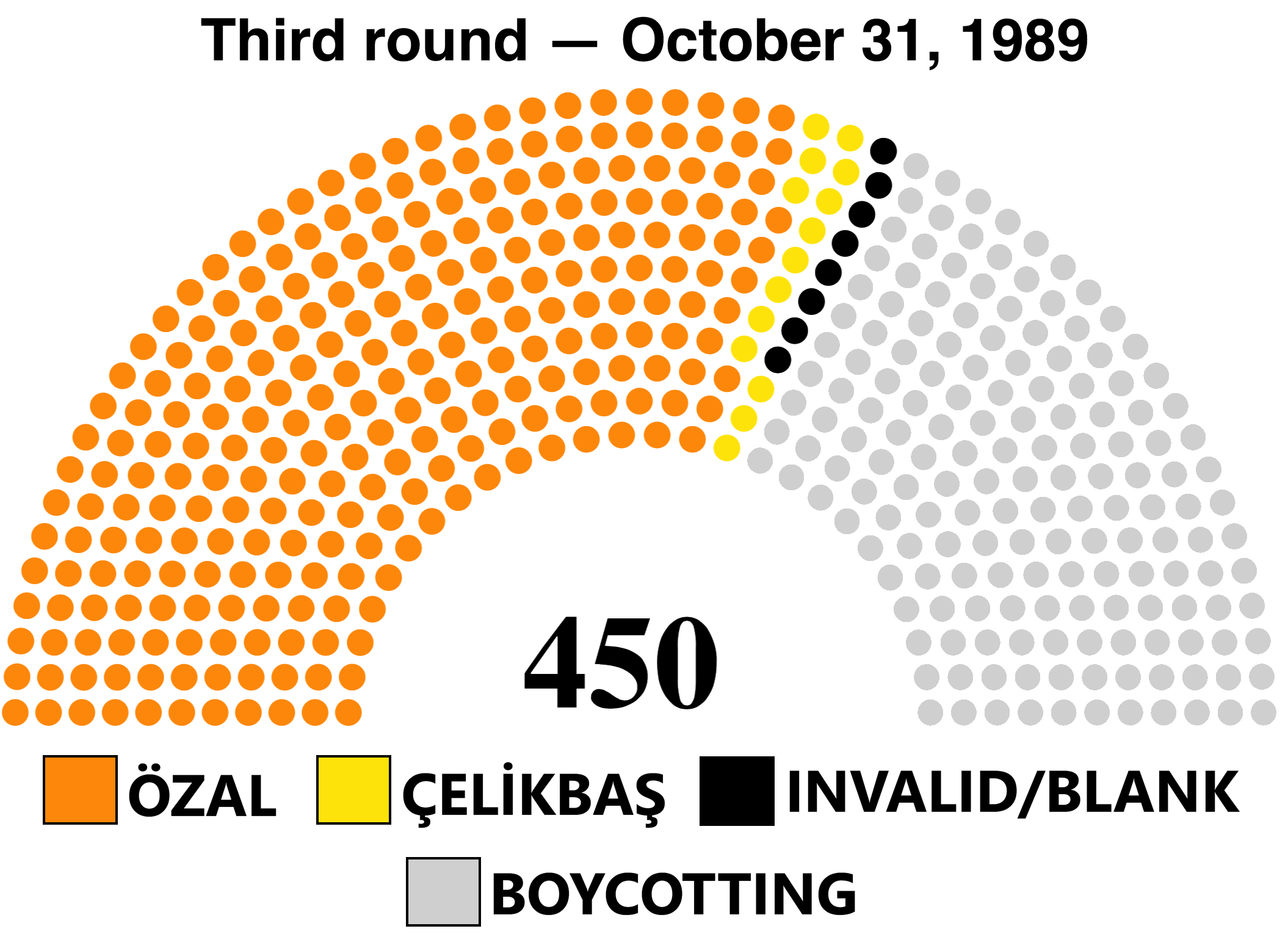
President before election
Kenan Evren
Military
Elected President
Turgut Özal
ANAP

The 1989 Turkish presidential election refers the election to choose the country's eighth president, to succeed Kenan Evren. The candidate of the governing Motherland Party (ANAP) was its leader and Prime Minister Turgut Özal. In the first and second rounds, the ruling party ANAP was unsuccessful in electing its candidate. Finally, in the third round, Turgut Özal was elected as the eighth President of Turkey. He was the second civil president in Turkish history.

The parliamentary opposition, formed by the True Path Party (DYP) and the Social Democratic People's Party (SHP) claimed that the loss of popular support for ANAP in the March 1989 local elections did not give the party the democratic legitimacy to elect one of its politicians as President. Since ANAP commanded a parliamentary majority, its candidate was effectively certain to win the third round, where only a simple majority of the vote is required to win. The opposition thus boycotted the election. Fethi Çelikbaş, an ANAP Member of Parliament who stood against Özal, was the only other candidate. There were eight blank votes in the third round, which was held on October 31.

== Results ==
Candidate	Party	Votes	%
Turgut Özal	Motherland Party	263	94.95
Fethi Çelikbaş	Motherland Party	14	5.05
Total		277	100.00
Valid votes		277	97.19
Invalid/blank votes		8	2.81
Total votes		285	100.00
Registered voters/turnout		450	63.33
