= 1923 Turkish presidential election =

First Turkish presidential election

- 29 October 1923
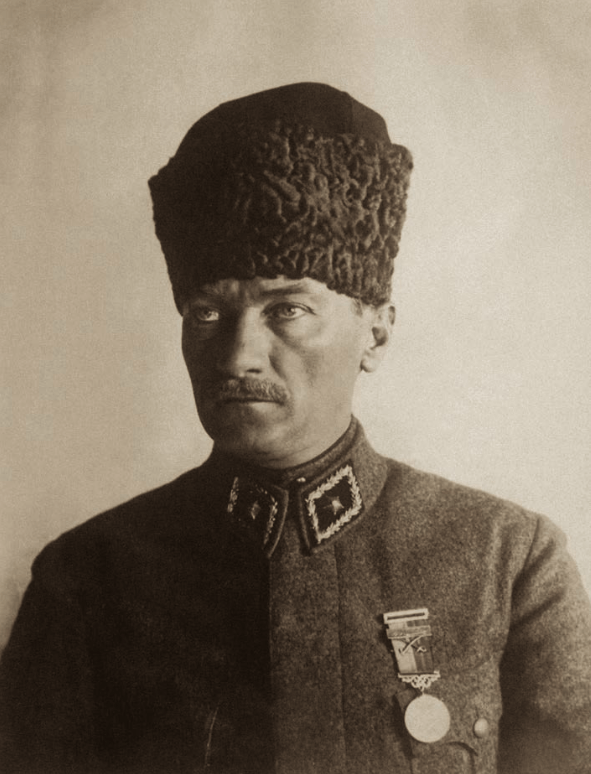
Nominee	Mustafa Kemal Atatürk
Party	CHP
MP votes	158
Elected President
Mustafa Kemal Atatürk
CHP

The 1923 Turkish presidential election is the presidential election held in the Grand National Assembly of Turkey on 29 October 1923. 158 MPs participated in the elections. Mustafa Kemal Atatürk, the Speaker of the Grand National Assembly of Turkey, was unanimously elected as the founding president in the first round.

== Results ==
Candidate	Party	Votes	%
Mustafa Kemal Atatürk	Republican People's Party	158	100.00
Total		158	100.00
