= 1938 Turkish presidential election =

Election of İsmet İnönü

- 11 November 1938
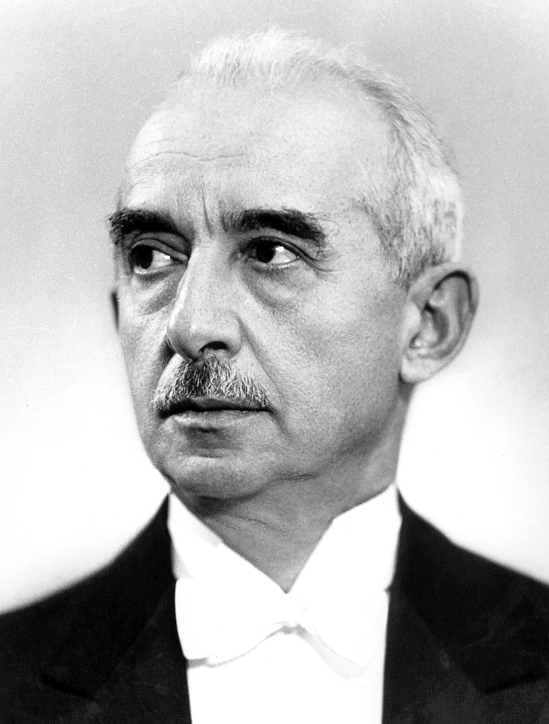
Nominee	İsmet İnönü
Party	CHP
MP votes	348
President before election
Mustafa Kemal Atatürk
CHP
Elected President
İsmet İnönü
CHP

The 1938 Turkish presidential election is the presidential election held in the Grand National Assembly of Turkey on 11 November 1938. The election was held one day after the death of President Mustafa Kemal Atatürk on 10 November 1938. 348 MPs participated in the elections. President İsmet İnönü was unanimously elected president.

== Results ==
Candidate	Party	Votes	%
İsmet İnönü	Republican People's Party	348	100.00
Total		348	100.00
