= 2011 in Turkey =

- Centuries: 20th; 21st
- Decades: 1990s; 2000s; 2010s; 2020s; 2030s
- See also: List of years in Turkey

Events in the year 2011 in Turkey.

== Incumbents ==
- President: Abdullah Gül
- Prime Minister: Recep Tayyip Erdoğan

== Events ==
- 19 May – The 5.8 M_{w} Kütahya earthquake shook western Turkey with a maximum Mercalli intensity of VII (Very strong). Two were killed and 122 were injured.
- 23 October – The 7.1 M_{w} Van earthquake shook eastern Turkey with a maximum Mercalli intensity of VIII (Severe). More than 600 were killed and 4,152 were injured.
- Undated — Turkey became the world’s largest refugee host after 2.6 million people enter Turkey from Syria following the start of the Syrian civil war.

== Deaths ==
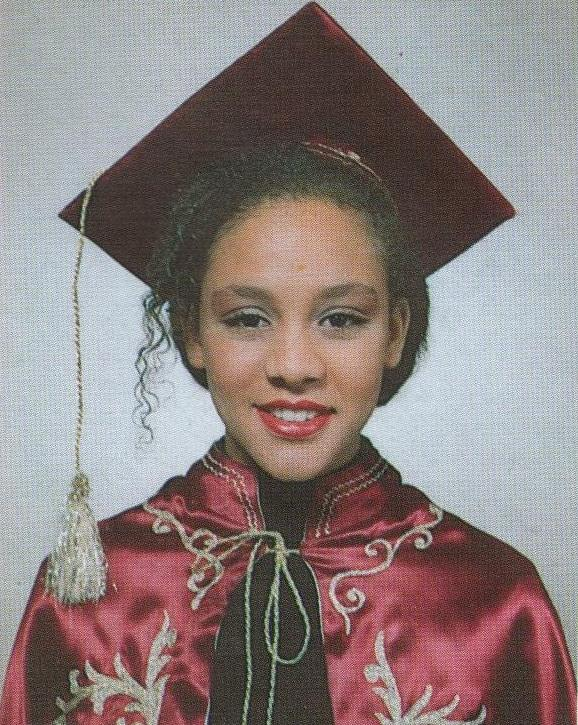
Defne Joy Foster

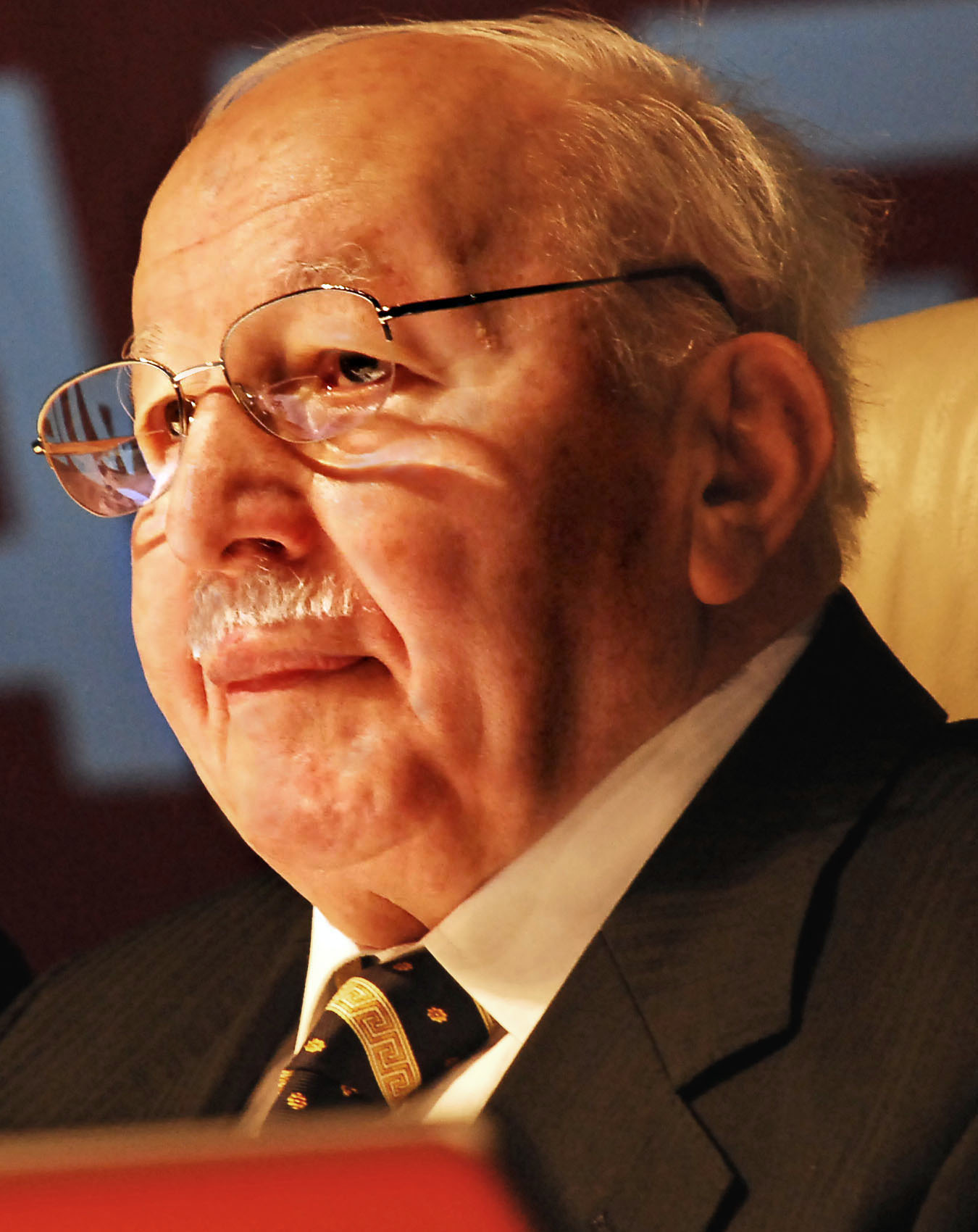
Necmettin Erbakan

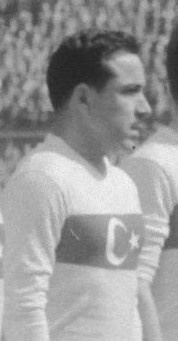
Coşkun Özarı

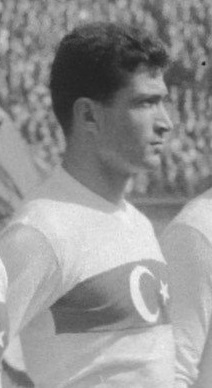
Kaya Köstepen

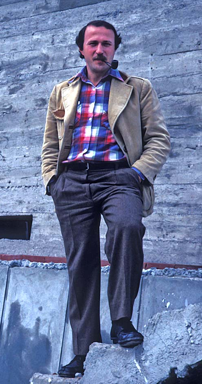
Hakkı Boran Ögelman

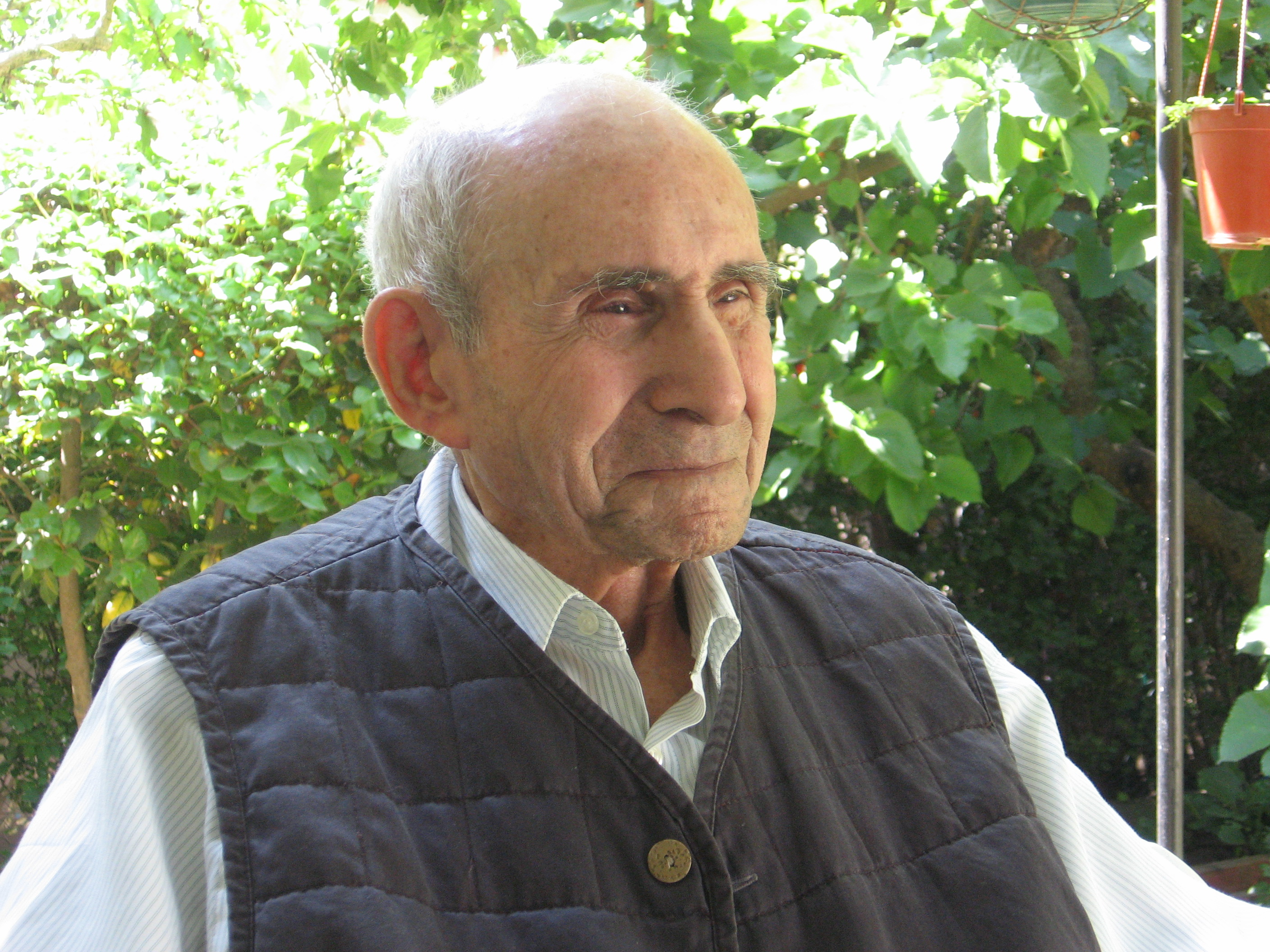
Lütfi Ömer Akad

=== January ===
- January 10 - Hanife Çetiner, fashion designer (b. 1938)

=== February ===
- February 2 - Defne Joy Foster, actress, presenter and VJ (born 1975)
- February 6 – Ali Mesut Erez, Turkish politician (born 1922)
- February 15 - Verda Ün, pianist (born 1919)
- February 17 - Emel Say, painter (born 1927)
- February 25 - Kamil Altan, footballer (born 1924)
- February 27 - Necmettin Erbakan, politician, engineer, and academic (born 1926)

=== March ===
- March 14 - Jülide Gülizar, anchorwoman and journalist (b. 1929)

=== April ===
- April 8 - Haydar Saltık, general (b. 1923)
- April 15 - Osman Durali, wrestler (b. 1939)
- April 19 - Mustafa Kemal Kurdaş, economist (b. 1920)
- April 25 - Güven Sazak, businessman (b. 1935)

=== May ===
- May 7 - Edibe Subaşı Kutucuoğlu, aviator (b. 1920)
- May 10 - Vedii Tosuncuk, footballer (b. 1921)
- May 29 - Nejat Tümer, admiral (b. 1924)

=== June ===
- June 1 - Fatoş Sezer, actress (b. 1958)
- June 20 - Safa Giray, engineer and politician (b. 1951)
- June 22 - Coşkun Özarı, footballer and manager (b. 1931)
- June 29 - Kaya Köstepen, footballer (b. 1934)

=== July ===
- July 16 - Refik Arslan, founder of Refik Restaurant (b. 1923)
- July 22 - Ali İhsan Göğüş, journalist and politician (b. 1923)
- July 25 - Bakır Çağlar, jurist, lawyer and professor (b. 1941)
- July 31 - Mesude Çağlayan, operatic soprano (b. 1918)

=== August ===
- August 7 - Cem Erman, actor (b. 1947)
- August 16 - Mihri Belli, politician (b. 1915)
- August 18 - Mustafa Haluk Güçlü, painter (b. 1951)
- August 19 - Beki Luiza Bahar, writer (b. 1926)
- August 24 - Seyhan Erözçelik, poet (b. 1962)
- August 28 - Necip Torumtay, general (b. 1926)

=== September ===
- September 4 – Hakkı Boran Ögelman physicist and astrophysicist (b. 1940)
- September 7 – Nedim Günar footballer (b. 1932)

=== October ===
- October 4
  - Muzaffer Tema, actor (b. 1919)
  - Selma Emiroğlu, cartoonist (b. 1928)
- October 5 – Gökşin Sipahioğlu, photographer and journalist (b. 1926)
- October 13 – Hasan Güngör, wrestler (b. 1934)
- October 18 – Behruz Çinici, architect (b. 1932)
- October 21 – Hikmet Bilâ, journalist and columnist (b. 1954)

=== November ===
- November 1 – Cahit Aral, engineer and politician (b. 1927)
- November 13 – Kaşif Kozinoğlu, intelligence official (b. 1955)
- November 14 – Esin Afşar, singer and stage actress (b. 1936)
- November 19 – Lütfi Ömer Akad, director, screenwriter and academician (b. 1916)
- 29 November – Server Tanilli, academic, journalist and author (born 1931)
- November 30 – Benyamin Sönmez, classical cellist (b. 1983)

=== December ===
- December 11 – Ahmed İhsan Kırımlı, politician (b. 1920)
- December 12 – Merih Sezen, fencer (b. 1919)
- December 15 – Fevzi Şeker, wrestler (b. 1962)
- December 23 – Aydın Menderes, politician (b. 1946)
- December 27 – Meral Menderes, operatic soprano (b. 1933)
- December 28 – Hasan Mutlucan, singer (b. 1926)

== See also ==
- List of Turkish films of 2011
