= National Security Council (Turkey, 1980) =

Turkish military junta from 1980 to 1983

Agency overview
- Formed: September 12, 1980
- Dissolved: December 7, 1983
- Superseding agency: Presidential Council
- Type: Legislative body Upper house of Constituent Assembly
- Agency executives: Kenan Evren, Chairman; Haydar Saltık, Secretary General

The National Security Council (Turkish: Millî Güvenlik Konseyi) was a military junta established to exercise legislative authority after the seizure of the country's government by the 1980 Turkish coup d'état. It consisted of Chief of General Staff General Kenan Evren, Commander of the Land Forces General Nurettin Ersin, Commander of the Naval Forces Admiral Nejat Tümer, Commander of the Air Force General Tahsin Şahinkaya, and Commander of the Gendarmerie General Sedat Celasun.

On November 7, 1982, in the 1982 Turkish constitutional referendum held in Turkey, the Constitution was approved with 91.37% of the votes and Kenan Evren was elected president for seven years in accordance with the provisional first article of the Constitution. The National Security Council ceased to exist on December 7, 1983, when the Presidency Council of the Grand National Assembly of Turkey was formed following the general elections held on November 6, 1983. Pursuant to the second provisional article of the Constitution, the members of the National Security Council became members of the Presidential Council for six years.

== Members ==
No.	Name	Position during the coup	Term of office
1	Kenan Evren	Chief of the General Staff	7 March 1978 – 1 July 1983
2	Nurettin Ersin	Commander of the Land Forces	9 March 1978 – 1 July 1983
3	Nejat Tümer	Commander of the Naval Forces	10 August 1980 – 6 December 1983
4	Tahsin Şahinkaya	Commanders of the Air Force	21 August 1978 – 6 December 1983
5	Sedat Celasun	General Commander of the Gendarmerie	25 August 1978 – 6 December 1983
