= Menderes (name) =

Menderes is a Turkish surname and a masculine given name. It refers to the Büyük Menderes River in western Anatolia. Notable people with the name include:

== Surname ==
- Adnan Menderes (1899–1961), Turkish politician and prime minister
- Aydın Menderes (1946–2011), Turkish politician
- Berrin Menderes (1905–1994), Turkish woman married to Adnan Menderes
- Meral Menderes (1933–2011), Turkish opera singer as soprano

== Given name ==
- Menderes Samancılar (born 1954), Turkish actor
- Menderes Türel (born 1964), Turkish politician
- Menderes Utku (born 1963), Turkish actor and businessman
