= Necdet Üruğ =

19th Chief of the General Staff of the Turkish Armed Forces from 1983 to 1987

19th Chief of the General Staff of Turkey
- In office 6 December 1983 – 2 July 1987
- President: Kenan Evren
- Preceded by: Nurettin Ersin
- Succeeded by: Haydar Saltık

Commander of the First Army of Turkey
- In office 15 March 1978 – 25 August 1981
- President: Fahri Korutürk; National Council; Kenan Evren
- Preceded by: Nurettin Ersin
- Succeeded by: Necip Torumtay

Commander of the Turkish Army
- In office 1 July 1983 – 6 December 1983
- Preceded by: Nurettin Ersin
- Succeeded by: Ali Haydar Saltık

Personal details
- Born: 19 February 1921 Istanbul, Ottoman Empire
- Died: 18 April 2021 (aged 100) Istanbul, Turkey
- Spouse: Fatma Necla
- Education: Turkish Military Academy

Military service
- Allegiance: Turkey
- Branch/service: Turkish Land Forces
- Years of service: 1941–1987
- Rank: General

Mustafa Necdet Üruğ (19 February 1921 – 18 April 2021) was a Turkish general and the nephew of Faruk Gürler.

== Biography ==
He was Commander of the First Army of Turkey (1978 – 1981) during the 1980 Turkish coup d'état. After the coup, he was Commander of the Turkish Army (1983), and Chief of the General Staff of Turkey (1983 – 1987), as well as Secretary-General of the Presidential Council (from 1983).

Üruğ died from complications of COVID-19 in Istanbul on 18 April 2021, at the age of 100, during the COVID-19 pandemic in Turkey.
