= Presidential Council (Turkey) =

The Presidential Council (Turkish: Cumhurbaşkanlığı Konseyi) was an advisory body in Turkey lasting from 1983 to 1989. It comprised the military commanders who joined General Kenan Evren in the 1980 coup d'état. It succeeded the National Security Council (1980–1983), of which Evren had been President, which was formally abolished after the 1983 general election, and reconstituted as the Presidential Council. Evren remained President of Turkey until 1989.

== Membership (in 1985) ==
Representing	Name	Rank
Secretary-General
Army	Necdet Üruğ	General
Members
Army	Nurettin Ersin	General
Air Force	Tahsin Şahinkaya	General
Navy	Nejat Tümer	Admiral
Gendarmerie	Sedat Celasun	General

== Sources ==
- The Europa World Year Book 1985, Volume I, p. 889
