= Menderes =

Menderes may refer to:

== Geography and places in Turkey ==
- Menderes (Istanbul Metro), an underground rapid transit station
- Menderes, İzmir, a district of İzmir Province
- Büyük Menderes River, a river in southwestern Turkey, known in ancient times as Meander
- Adnan Menderes Airport, in İzmir
- Adnan Menderes Airport Rail Station, in southern Gaziemir
- Adnan Menderes University, in Aydın

== People ==
- Menderes (name), list of people with the name
