= Atatürk International Peace Prize =

Turkish award

The Atatürk International Peace Prize (Turkish: Atatürk Uluslararası Barış Ödülü) is an award delivered since 1986 to award people and organizations who have made memorable contributions to world peace in accordance with Kemal Atatürk's quotation, "Peace at Home, Peace in the World". It was created during the presidency of coup leader Kenan Evren, by the Atatürk Association for Culture, Language and History. The award is given to candidates nominated by members of non-governmental organizations, the Senate of Turkish universities and also the secretaries general of the United Nations and the Organization of Islamic Cooperation. The president of Turkey as well as the speaker of the Grand National Assembly of Turkey can also present candidates. After the prize was not awarded for 13 years after 2000, in 2013 it was decided to award it only every five years. An award was to be given in 2015, but was no ceremony is documented. The next award was planned to be given in 2020, but again was not awarded after all. In 2025, Atatürk Association for Culture, Language and History declared the resumption of the award.

== Laureates ==
Laureates of the Atatürk International Peace Prize
Year	Laureate	Position	Comments
1986	Joseph Luns	Secretary General of NATO	
1987	Richard von Weizsäcker	President of Germany	
1989	Takahito Mikasa	Japanese prince and academic	At the award ceremony, he stated that world peace can only be achieved after poverty is eliminated.
1990	Kenan Evren	President of Turkey	
1992	Nelson Mandela	President of South Africa	Nelson Mandela declined the prize, citing the persecution of Kurds in Turkey. His decision created an uproar in Turkish society. Following it, the newspaper Hürriyet published an issue with the headline "Ugly African" (Turkish: Çirkin Afrikalı). Mandela changed his mind and accepted the award in 1999.
1995	Turkish Red Crescent	Turkish NGO	
1996	UNICEF	Children emergency fund of the United Nations	
1997	Stabilisation Force in Bosnia and Herzegovina	peacekeeping force of NATO	For their achievements in maintaining peace in Bosnia and Herzegovina.
1999	Heydar Aliyev	President of Azerbaijan	Several of his policies were inspired by Atatürk.
2000	Rauf Denktaş	President of the Turkish Republic of Cyprus	
2025	António Guterres	Secretary-General of the United Nations	
