= Sekine Evren =

First lady of Turkey from 1980 to 1982

First Lady of Turkey
- In role 12 September 1980 – 3 March 1982
- President: Kenan Evren
- Preceded by: Emel Korutürk
- Succeeded by: Semra Özal

Personal details
- Born: Sekine Muslu; 4 May 1922 Alaşehir, Ottoman Empire
- Died: 3 March 1982 (aged 59) Ankara, Turkey
- Resting place: Cebeci Asri Cemetery
- Spouse: Kenan Evren (m. 1944)
- Children: 4

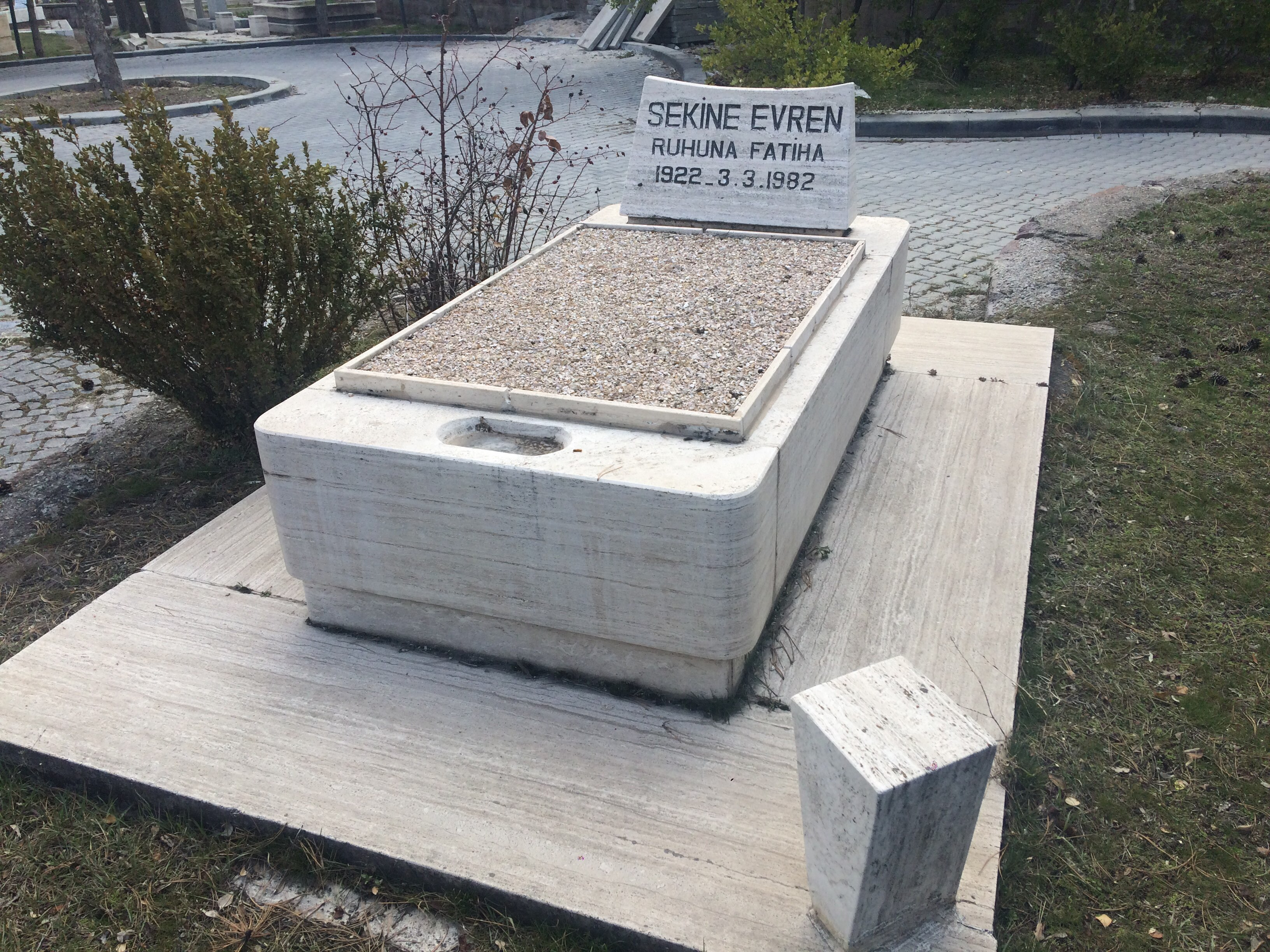
Sekine Evren's grave, Cebeci Modern Cemetery, March 2022

Sekine Evren (née Muslu; 4 May 1922 – 3 March 1982) was the First Lady of Turkey from 12 September 1980 until her death on 3 March 1982 during the presidency of her husband Kenan Evren.

Sekine Muslu was born as the first daughter of a vine grower in Alaşehir of Manisa, then Ottoman Empire, in 1922. Yet, several accounts, including those cited in Dersim’s Lost Girls by Nezahat and Kazım Gündoğan, dispute this origin, alleging that she may have been one of the abducted children from the 1938 Dersim massacre, whose identity was later altered before she was adopted in Alaşehir. She had three younger sisters. She could not complete her education. She married Senior lieutenant Kenan Evren in 1944 without the permission of her parents. She lost her first child at birth as her husband was assigned to the Turkish Brigade during the Korean War (1950–1953). She gave birth to three daughters Şenay, Gülay and Miray. Evren became diabetic at an early age. During a trip in Brussels, Belgium in May 1980, she had a heart attack and became paralyzed.

On 12 September 1980, the Turkish Armed Forces under the leadership of Chief of the General Staff four-star general Kenan Evren staged a military coup. The military junta overturned the government, and appointed Kenan Evren head of state. Sekine Evren rejected to move into the presidential residence Çankaya Mansion because her husband was self-proclaimed President and was not legitimately selected. She resided in the military lodging.

Sekine Evren died on 3 March 1982. She was interred following a state funeral held at the Hacı Bayram Mosque in Ankara.
