= Necdet Öztorun =

Turkish general

Commander of the First Army of Turkey
- In office 22 August 1983 – 23 August 1984
- Preceded by: Ali Haydar Saltık
- Succeeded by: Necip Torumtay

Commander of the Turkish Army
- In office 12 August 1985 – 2 July 1987
- President: Kenan Evren
- Preceded by: Ali Haydar Saltık
- Succeeded by: Necip Torumtay

Personal details
- Born: 1924 Konya, Turkey
- Died: October 7, 2010 (aged 86) Ankara, Turkey

Military service
- Allegiance: Turkey
- Branch/service: Turkish Army
- Years of service: 1941 – 1987
- Rank: General

Necdet Öztorun (1924, Konya – 7 October 2010, Ankara) was a Turkish general. He was Commander of the First Army of Turkey (1983 – 1984) and then Commander of the Turkish Army (1985 – 1987).

Öztorun graduated from the Turkish Military Academy in 1943 and the Turkish Military College in 1959.

He commanded a brigade of the 33rd Infantry Division; commander of the 51st Infantry Division. He was promoted to Lieutenant General in 1976. He then served as the Commander of the 6th Corps (Turkey) and the Commander of the 2nd Corps.

He retired in 1987.
