= Doğan Güreş =

21st Chief of the General Staff of the Turkish Armed Forces from 1990 to 1994

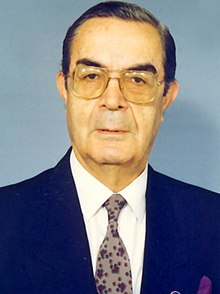

21st Chief of the General Staff of Turkey
- In office 6 December 1990 – 30 August 1994
- President: Turgut Özal; Suleyman Demirel
- Preceded by: Necip Torumtay
- Succeeded by: İsmail Hakkı Karadayı

Commander of the Turkish Army
- In office 23 August 1989 – 6 December 1990
- Preceded by: Kemal Yamak
- Succeeded by: Muhittin Füsunoğlu

Personal details
- Born: 15 February 1926 Kilis, Turkey
- Died: 14 October 2014 (aged 88) Ankara, Turkey
- Education: Turkish Military Academy

Military service
- Allegiance: Turkey
- Branch/service: Turkish Land Forces
- Years of service: 1947–1994
- Rank: General
- Unit: Armoured Corps; M4 Sherman (1947-1954) and M47 Patton (1954-1965
- Commands: B Tank Company, 1st Btn 2nd Armoured Brigade (1955-1959); 1st Battalion, 2nd Armoured Brigade (1961-1965); Special Warfare Department Regiment II (1964-1972); 2nd Armoured Brigade (1972-1977); National Military Academy (1977-1980); 5th Corps (1980-1987); First Army (1987-1990)

Doğan Güreş (15 February 1926 – 14 October 2014) was a Turkish general and True Path Party politician.

== Education ==
After he graduated from Kuleli Military High School in 1945, Güreş kept on studying at the Turkish Military Academy and accomplished a degree in 1947. Following, he received a degree from the School of Transportation in 1949. He was engaged in several posts in the Turkish Land Forces and in 1965 he also graduated from the Army Staff College.

== Military career ==
He was Chief of the General Staff of Turkey from 1990 to 1994, having been Commander of the First Army of Turkey (1987–1989) and Commander of the Turkish Army (1989–1990). As Necip Torumtay resigned from his post as Chief of General Staff, Gürsel was appointed in his stead the next day. In 1992, he proclaimed self-confidently that "Turkey is a military state". The 1991 Yeşilova incident took place under his tenure as Chief of the General Staff, as did the 1992 Operation Northern Iraq and the 26 July 1994 bombing of North Iraq.

=== The Kurdish question and military tutelage ===
In an interview with journalist Fikret Bila for his book Komutanlar Cephesi (Commanders Front), Doğan Güreş stated that from the first operation carried out by Turkey against PKK targets in northern Iraq during his tenure as Chief of General Staff, to the Çekiç Güç, the planes violating the border and the "shoot" orders he gave to Gendarmerie Asayish Commander Lieutenant General Necati Özgen, he did not consult with then-President Turgut Özal, Prime Minister Süleyman Demirel, nor meet with the National Security Council. He said that a coup d'état wasn't necessary at the time because they were already giving him an environment in which he could do whatever he wanted and that he was "de facto in charge".

Regarding the uprisings against the security forces in Eastern and Southeastern Anatolia, Doğan Güreş said in an interview he gave to the Milliyet newspaper on September 25, 26, following the National Security Council meeting held in September 1992, that there was no Kurdish problem, that there was a southeastern problem and that the period of total struggle began with the cooperation of the government of the time.

== Political career ==
After his retirement as in 1994, he was elected to parliament for the True Path Party in the 1995 parliamentary elections (representing Kilis), and re-elected in 1999, serving until November 2002. He was also True Path's presidential candidate in the 2000 Turkish presidential election.

Güreş was known for his harmonious work with Tansu Çiller, who, after taking office as prime minister in 1993, chose to pursue a policy that would further weaken the PKK. He was known as the key figure behind the operation. According to a news report from the time, Güreş responded to the British Chief of General Staff's question, "Does your female Prime Minister give orders?" and said, "What do you mean, can she give orders freely? She gives orders with a snap, and I give the salute with a snap and carry out the order." After he was elected as an MP, Güreş hung a portrait of Çiller and Atatürk in his room.

Doğan Güreş died in Ankara at the Gülhane Military Medical Academy where he was treated, on 14 October 2014.

== See also ==
- Susurluk scandal
