= Yeşilova incident =

1991 armed standoff at a Turkish refugee camp

- Yeşilova (Turkey)
Date	April 1991
Location	Yeşilova, Turkey
Result	Royal Marines withdraw with supplies

Belligerents
United Kingdom	Turkey

Commanders and leaders
(United Kingdom) Unknown	(Turkey) Unknown

Units involved
(United Kingdom) Royal Marines	(Turkey) Turkish Armed Forces

Strength
30 marines	Several hundreds

Casualties and losses
- No casualties

The Yeşilova incident was a reported armed standoff that took place at a refugee camp in Yeşilova, a small Turkish town near the border between Iraq and Turkey, between British Royal Marines and the Turkish Armed Forces. Local Turkish soldiers have been accused by reporter Robert Fisk of stealing essential goods and preventing medical care from deprived refugees in dire conditions, with a cholera outbreak ongoing. Other reporters such as Hugh Pope deny this version of the events.

== Background ==
In March 1991, with the end of hostilities between Coalition forces and the Iraqi military, Iraqi President Saddam Hussein sought to quash the rising Shiite and Kurdish insurgents who were rebelling against his regime. Saddam managed to put down the rebellions with little effort but continued to persecute the Kurds in northern Iraq. Thousands of Kurdish and Assyrian civilians were displaced, most of them finding shelter in refugee camps in Turkey. Though coalition forces ultimately chose not to intervene against the crackdown, they did launch a massive humanitarian relief effort to at least help alleviate the plight of the refugees.

== The incident ==
According to British journalist Robert Fisk, the only reporter present, in April 1991, a British Marines unit consisting of about thirty men was tasked with distributing relief supplies to 3,000 Kurds and Assyrians in Yeşilova under the watch of the Turkish military, but they found themselves in direct confrontation with the Turks. The Turkish soldiers, instead of cooperating with the British Marines in relief distribution, were charged with stealing blankets, bed linen, flour and food, including sixty boxes of water, intended for the refugees, forcing the Marines to intervene. The British Marines asked to transport the refugees out of the country, a request that was denied by the local Turkish commander. The Marines were thus forced to pile the supplies back into their helicopters to prevent further pillaging but also faced a possible firefight against the Turkish forces. On April 29, a detachment of diplomatic officials and CIA agents attached to the United States Embassy in Ankara arrived in Yeşilova to help defuse the situation. They found that various diseases, including cases of acute diarrhea and cholera, had broken out among the civilians in the camp and that the refugees had been deprived of medical services by the Turkish military.

Fisk filed an article for the newspaper The Independent on April 30 from Diyarbakır, describing the confrontation between the Royal Marines and the Turkish soldiers. Fisk's report incensed Turkish authorities, who detained him in Diyarbakır. Turkey's Foreign Ministry and the army's Chief of Staff, General Doğan Güreş, denounced Fisk's article, claiming it was "planned, programmed propaganda." He was interrogated but eventually released and expelled from Turkey. Fisk speculated that charges were being prepared by the governor of Diyarbakır for "defaming" the Turkish military and later described the interrogation session as "pathetic and frightening."

Fisk's fellow journalist at the Independent, Hugh Pope stated that his "cavalier treatment of facts seems to be true" in the case, pointing out numerous inaccuracies in Fisk's account.

John Kifner of the New York Times also covered the story quoting a Royal Marines spokesman, Sgt. N. B. Durant, who described the incident between British and Turkish soldiers as a "Mexican standoff."

== Reactions ==
The European Commission and numerous journalists protested and demanded an explanation from the Turkish government.
