= Arif Şirin =

Ozan Arif
- Born: Arif Şirin; June 10, 1949; Alucra, Giresun Province, Turkey
- Died: February 13, 2019 (aged 69) Samsun Province, Turkey
- Genres: Turkish folk music
- Occupations: Musician, Poet, Composer, Baglama virtuoso, Folk poetry, Ashik, Teacher
- Instruments: Singing, Bağlama
- Years active: 1970–2019

Arif Şirin, commonly known as Ozan Arif ("Arif the Bard"; June 10, 1949 – February 13, 2019), was a Turkish male folk music artist, poet, composer, songwriter and bağlama performer and teacher foremost known for his songs with lyrics propagating the Idealist cause and Alparslan Türkeş.

== Life ==
Ozan Arif was born in his father's village Yükselen (Hapu) in Alucra district. By 1970, he had graduated from the Male Teacher's School in Ordu Province and worked as a primary school teacher in Samsun from 1970 to 1979. Following the 1980 Turkish coup d'état, he moved to Germany where he lived until his return to Turkey in 1991.

He and fellow folk singer İsmail Türüt had been on trial for a song allegedly praising the assassination of Hrant Dink. Şirin and Türüt were acquitted in December 2009.

== Death ==
Şirin died on February 13, 2019 in the hospital of Faculty of Medicine of Ondokuz Mayıs University of laryngeal cancer.
