= Erdal Eren =

Far-left Turkish militant

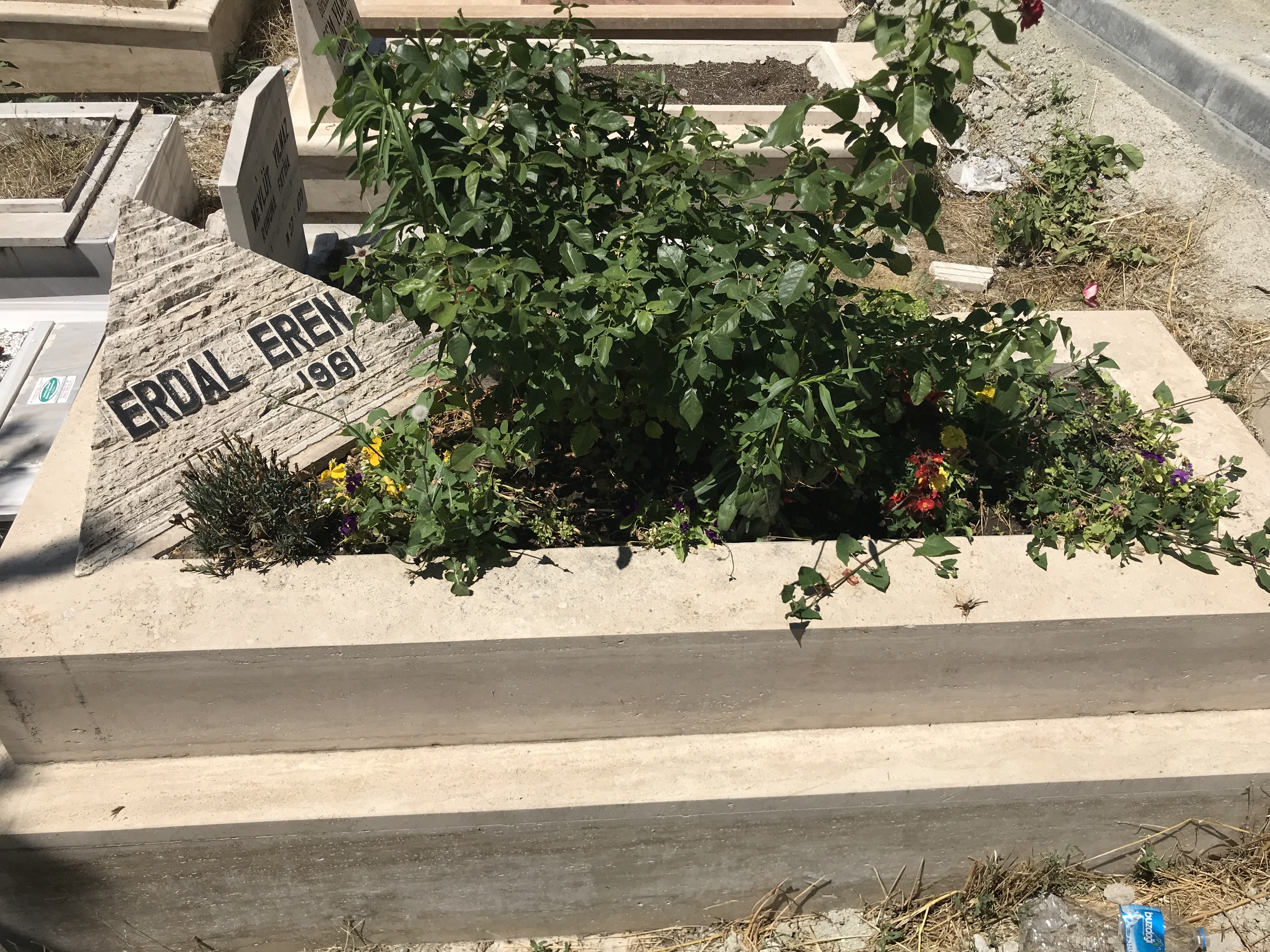
Erdal Eren's grave in Ankara Karşıyaka Cemetery

Erdal Eren was a far-left militant executed by hanging in the aftermath of the military coup in September 1980 in Turkey. Eren was born on the 25 September 1961 or March 1962 in Şebinkarahisar, Giresun. His death sparked outrage in the Turkish society, as, according to his lawyer, he was 17 years old at the time of his execution. However, his father wrote in his letter to Kenan Evren that during the event Zekeriya Önge was killed, Eren was 18 years and 4 months old. Though, the issue of his age had not been important or agitated at the trial itself. It was later brought up in an appeal statement after the death penalty sentence had already been decided by the court. Eren was a student at a vocational high school in Ankara and a member of the Patriotic Revolutionary Youth Association. He was also a member of the Hoxhaist Revolutionary Communist Party of Turkey.

He was arrested on the 2 February 1980 during a protest against the murder of Sinan Suner, who had been killed by a member of the security detail of Cengiz Gökçek from the Nationalist Movement Party (MHP). During the protest, Eren fled a confrontation with the police, but was later caught. The officer who caught him, Zekeriya Önge, was shot a few moments later and Eren was prosecuted and sentenced to death for the murder on 19 March. During trial Eren denied having killed Önge and witnesses testified that the police officer was shot from behind and from some distance by a third party. In an interview with Savaş Ay shortly before he was executed Eren claimed to have shot at soldiers randomly and assumed Önge was killed by his as well as another soldier's shot. Eren was hanged on the 13 December 1980 in Ulucanlar prison and buried in Karşıyaka cemetery. The coup leader, Kenan Evren, claimed that Eren was a terrorist and had murdered Önge by shooting him from behind.

== Legacy ==
Every year mourners would hold meetings in his memory at his grave and several artists dedicated their art and songs to his memory. Ahmet Kaya, Grup Yorum, Sezen Aksu and Teoman have recorded songs dedicated to Eren. In June 2015, the municipal assembly of Aydın decided to change the name of Kenan Evren street in Kuşadası district into Erdal Eren street.
