= Necip Torumtay =

20th Chief of the General Staff of the Turkish Armed Forces from 1987 to 1990

- Born: 1926; Vakfıkebir, Trabzon, Turkey
- Died: 28 August 2011 (aged 84–85); Ankara, Turkey
- Education: Turkish Military Academy
- Military career
- Allegiance: Turkey
- Branch: Turkish Land Forces
- Service years: 1946–1990
- Rank: General
- Commands: Chief of the Turkish General Staff; Commander of the Turkish Land Forces; Commander of the First Army
- Awards: Turkish Armed Forces Medal of Distinguished Service

Necip Torumtay (1926 – 28 August 2011) was the 20th Chief of the General Staff of the Republic of Turkey.

== Career ==
He graduated Turkish Military Academy with the rank of second lieutenant in 1944, and in 1946, he graduated the Army Artillery School. He served in various artillery units and later as an instructor at the artillery school. In 1954, Torumtay became a staff officer following his further education in the academy. Until 1970, he served at various units and then in Tokyo, Japan as a military attaché.

In 1970, Necip Torumtay was promoted to the rank of brigadier general. He became a major general in 1974. Four years later, he was appointed lieutenant general, and finally in 1982 general. As a brigadier general, he was vice-commander of the 1st Armoured Division, Commander 2nd Armoured Brigade, and Head of the Operations Plan Department at Supreme Headquarters Allied Powers Europe (SHAPE), as a major general he was Genelkumay Planning of Operations Department and the Commander 4th Infantry Division, as a lieutenant general, Commander of the Cyprus Turkish Peace Forces, General Staff Operations (J3) Head of the General Staff General Plans and Policy (J5).

In the era following the 1980 Turkish coup d'état, Necip Torumtay held important top positions within military circles.

On 2 July 1987, Necip Torumtay was appointed as the Commander of the Turkish Land Forces, and shortly after on 24 July he became the Chief of the Turkish General Staff. He resigned on 3 December 1990 before his term of office ended. He is the first chief of staff who resigned his post before the end of office in the history of Turkish Republic.

It was asserted that his resignation was due to the government's position on the Gulf War (2 August 1990 – 28 February 1991). It was told that he was strongly opposed to President Turgut Özal's stance in favor of joining the coalition forces in the war against Iraq.

On 24 June 2011, Necip Torumtay suffered symptoms of coronary artery spasm during his stay at the Aksaz Naval Base in Marmaris, and was transferred to the Gülhane Military Hospital, Ankara, by an air ambulance. He died on August 28, 2011, in the same hospital. He was married with Türkan Torumtay, who outlived her husband and the couple had three children.

Necip Torumtay was decorated with the Turkish Armed Forces Medal of Distinguished Service.

Military offices
Preceded by Necdet Öztorun	Commander of the Turkish First Army; 24 August 1984 – 11 August 1985	Succeeded by Recep Orhan Ergun
Preceded by Necdet Öztorun	Commander of the Turkish Army; 2 July 1987 – 24 July 1987	Succeeded by Kemal Yamak
Preceded by Necdet Üruğ	Chief of the General Staff of Turkey; 24 July 1987 – 3 December 1990	Succeeded by Doğan Güreş
