= Hakkı Ögelman =

Turkish astrophysicist (1940–2011)

Hakkı Boran Ögelman
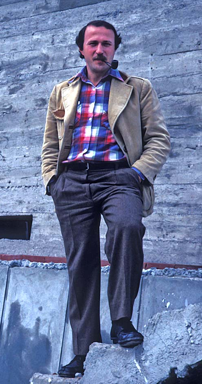
- Ögelman in front of the Çukurova University Solar House construction in 1981.
- Born: July 8, 1940
- Died: September 4, 2011 (aged 71)
- Citizenship: Turkey
- Education: DePauw University (BA); Cornell University (MA, PhD)
- Known for: Gamma-ray astronomy, neutron stars physics, solar physics
- Scientific career
- Workplaces: University of Sydney; Goddard Space Flight Center; Middle East Technical University; Çukurova University; Max Planck Institute

Hakkı Boran Ögelman (July 8, 1940 – September 4, 2011) was a Turkish physicist and astrophysicist. He was an expert on gamma ray astronomy, the physics of neutron stars, and solar energy and worked on several key topics in modern astrophysics. He made many contributions to high-energy astrophysics. In his early professional career he engaged in the SAS-II Small Gamma Ray Astronomy Satellite experiment development, data analysis, and first detection and imaging of our universe in gamma rays with his NASA colleagues, as well as in other fields of physics. His main interests in the field of astrophysics were the study of gamma ray astronomy and compact objects such as neutron stars and pulsars. Ögelman worked at NASA's Goddard Space Flight Center, Middle East Technical University (METU) in Ankara, Turkey, Çukurova University in Adana, Turkey, Max Planck Institute (MPI) at Garching, Germany and the University of Wisconsin.

== Early life and education ==
Hakkı Ögelman was born in Ankara, Turkey, on July 8, 1940. His father was Salehettin Ögelman, a lawyer, and his mother was Vedya Özlem Ögelman, a school teacher.

Ögelman attended Robert College in Istanbul, receiving his baccalaureate in 1957, then went to the United States to further his education. He received his B.A. in physics from DePauw University in June 1960 and his M.Sc. and Ph.D. from Cornell University in 1963 and 1966, respectively. He married a DePauw classmate, Ivy White.

After his 1966 graduation from Cornell, Ögelman did one year of postdoctoral research at the University of Sydney, Australia. He then worked at Goddard Space Flight Center from September 1967 to January 1970 as National Academy of Sciences Research Associate.

== Turkey and METU ==
In February 1970 Ögelman decided to return to Turkey, so that he could contribute his experimental research and teaching capabilities to his country. He was hired as an associate professor in the Middle East Technical University (METU) Physics Department, and was appointed department chairman that same year. He started an experimental High Energy Astrophysics group specializing in gamma ray astronomy—at the time, a fledgling new field—and took on graduate students for the group's M.Sc. and Ph.D. programs. Ögelman also started a new solar energy group to train graduate students to address Turkey's energy needs. Additionally, he worked with the METU's Carbon-14 Dating Group, led by Yeter Güksü, a physics department colleague who would later become his second wife.

During Ögelman's time at METU, his astrophysics group's major projects used data of NASA's SAS-II (Second Small Astronomy Satellite) gamma ray telescope. With this group and his former NASA colleagues, Ögelman co-authored several critical papers on gamma ray astronomy published using the SAS II data. Their work covered the premiere satellite based detection of gamma rays from celestial objects, the observation of galactic gamma ray emission from compact objects including the Crab Nebula, and the discovery of Geminga.

The SAS II gamma ray telescope's successful results during the 1970s brought gamma ray astronomy of age and established it as the newest astrophysics field. Under Ögelman's leadership, his group carried out actual data analysis at METU with graduate and undergraduate students, and contributed significantly to the SAS II project's success. By that time the once-fledgling field of gamma ray astronomy had since grown into a major science utilizing numerous other space-based and balloon-born telescopes, and many important discoveries have been made extending astronomy to the high energy region.

In 1973 Ögelman took a leave of absence from METU to complete his army service. In 1974 he took a sabbatical leave of absence to serve as a National Academy of Sciences Senior Research Associate at the Goddard Space Flight Center in Greenbelt, Maryland, working with his colleagues at NASA's Gamma Ray Astronomy Group led by Dr. Carl E. Fichtel. Ögelman returned to METU in 1975, becoming a full professor in 1976.

In 1977, at the invitation of the president of Çukurova University (CÜ) in Adana, Turkey, Ögelman took another leave of absence and with three of his METU colleagues (and, later, some of his graduate and post graduate students from METU, who formed the core of the new Physics Department) moved to Çukurova to start and establish its Faculty of Arts and Sciences. Becoming the founding Dean of the faculty, he decided to take students without delay, and the group started classes in barracks. Eventually, Ögelman arranged for funding from the Ford Foundation and the USAID to start a modern research laboratory in the campus. He also took an interest in the local economy and needs of the people, and encouraged the faculty to research in fields with most benefit to the region. One of the most important topics to address at that time concerning physics was Turkish society's energy needs. Ögelman gave priority to solar energy research in the Physics Department because in the Çukurova region there is plenty of sunshine throughout the year. To this end, as he had at METU, he started research in solar energy, building Turkey's first energy efficient solar house and a solar pond. Ögelman left Çukurova in 1982 to return to METU but continued working with his previous students as colleagues on astrophysics.

From July 1983 to July 1985, Ögelman again took a leave of absence from METU, spending the period as a guest scientist at the Max Planck Institute for Extraterrestrial Physics (MPE) in Munich, Germany. Ögelman then became a resident scientist at MPE and worked there from July 1985 to January 1991. He started working on X-ray data of the Einstein and Exosat satellites. After the launch of the hugely successful ROSAT (Röntgensatellit - German X-Ray Satellite) Observatory (June 1, 1990 – February 12, 1999) led by Principal Investigator (PI) Joachim Trümper at MPE and developed through a cooperative program between Germany, the United States, and the United Kingdom, Ögelman became one of the main investigators with this satellite. ROSAT performed the first all sky surveys with imaging telescopes, leading to the discovery of 125,000 X-ray and 479 EUV sources. In addition the diffuse galactic X-ray emission was mapped with unprecedented angular resolution (< 1 arcmin). Most of the mission time was devoted to pointed observations at selected targets. In total 4,580 PSPC (Position Sensitive Proportional Counter) and 4482 HRI fields were covered with observation times between ~ 2,000 sec and ~ 1 Million sec. 700 Scientists (PIs) from 24 countries were involved in these pointed observations. The total number of ROSAT based publications is 4787, with 54,9 % in referred journals (status August 2001). Ögelman took part in the analysis of ROSAT data from the beginning and published some of his most exciting research work.

In 1983 he proposed X-ray observations of a classical nova in outburst (GQ Mus) with Exosat. The nova turned to be a luminous X-ray source in the lowest range of X-ray energy (called "supersoft") proving the thermonuclear burning on the surface of a white dwarf, thought to be the cause of the outburst. With ROSAT Ögelman and collaborators could establish that novae in outburst are among the most luminous sources in the X-ray sky.

In 1988 Ögelman was awarded Turkey's highest scientific honor, the Sedat Simavi Prize. In 1991, he received the Turkish Scientific and Technical Research Council Prize. He represented Turkey on international science councils and co-operations, and served on NASA committees and working groups. He was instrumental in the 1991 establishment of the TÜBİTAK National Observatory. Around this time Ögelman's second marriage ended. He began seeing and subsequently married an Italian astronomer, Marina Orio; they spent the remainder of his life together.

== University of Wisconsin ==
At Max Planck, Ögelman had met the University of Wisconsin astrophysicist Prof. William F. "Jack" Fry, who would become a good friend and mentor. Fry returned to the University of Wisconsin from MPE with an interest in building up the Wisconsin astrophysics program by adding a high-energy astrophysics group to complement the astroparticle and neutrino group. He persuaded Hakkı Ögelman to join the Wisconsin faculty, first as a visiting professor from January 1991 to September 1992, and, then, from the end of 1992, as a full-time professor. One of Ögelman's METU students, Prof. A. Baha Balantekin, was already at Wisconsin University Physics Department, having arrived in 1986. (Balantekin served as department chairman between 2008 and 2011.)

During Ögelman's tenure at Wisconsin, he continued to pursue his interest in compact objects, and published roughly sixty papers on the subject between 1991 and 1998. As time passed and experiments became larger and more institutional, Ögelman devoted an increasing amount of time to data analysis and worked on analyzing the data from major X-ray missions such as the ROSAT Telescope, Beppo-SAX, and the Chandra X-ray Observatory.

While at Wisconsin, Ögelman visited METU, Sabancı University and Çukurova University in Turkey nearly every summer. He visited and worked with his former graduate students Profs. Ümit Kızıloğlu Mehmet Emin Özel, Akif Esendemir, Solen Balman and with İlhami Yeğingil at Çukurova—all of whom had become professors by this time—and also with Prof. Altan Baykal. Ögelman especially spent significant amount of time with Prof. Ali Alpar at Sabancı University, a private university in Istanbul on pulsar research and jointly publishing several papers, which he considered to be some of his best work. Ögelman also took part and/or organized several scientific symposiums, conferences meetings with his colleagues in Turkey.

In 1997, Ögelman suffered a major stroke. His life was saved by the intervention and treatment of University of Wisconsin doctors. He returned to work after his recovery and carried on working on his research but at a slower pace. Life was difficult for him because his movement was limited. In the spring of 2011, Ögelman's declining health forced his retirement.

== Personal life ==
Ögelman loved music, literature and sports. He was a competitive wrestler in college and a black belt in judo. Ögelman in his later years also turned his robust intellect and attention to exploring sustainable solutions to the changing climate and the world's evolving energy needs. He was an active member of the Union of Concerned Scientists. Ögelman enjoyed time and travel with his three sons and a daughter-in-law, Kenan Ögelman of Austin, Texas, Nedim and Laura Ögelman of Purcellville, Virginia, and Roberto Ögelman of Madison, Wisconsin, and two grandsons; Anders and Soren Ögelman, of Purcellville, Virginia.

Hakkı Ögelman died on September 4, 2011. In his memory, the Turkish Astronomical Society established the Hakkı Ögelman Summer Schools, to "offer intense summer training to undergraduate and graduate students of astronomy from all over Turkey, in physics, computation and other subjects related to research in astronomy." The Turkish Philanthropy Funds coordinates international contributions to this project.

== Academic history ==
- Member of NASA's High Energy Astrophysics Management Operations Working Group (1995 forward)
- Member of the Turkish Academy of Sciences (1994 forward)
- Executive Committee member of the High Energy Astrophysics Division of the High Energy Astrophysics Division of the American Astronomical Society (1993–95)
- Board member of the Astronomy and Astrophysics Division of the European Physics Society (1983–91)
- Member of the Space Science Council of the European Science Foundation (1979–86)
- Science Council member of the Turkish Science and Technology Research Council (TÜBITAK) (1976–83)
- Executive Council member of the European Science Foundation (1980–83)
- A member of the European Physical Society, the Turkish Physical Society, the American Astronomical Society, and the International Astronomical Union
- Consultant, Scientific and Technical Research Council of Turkey (1993–94)
- Professor, Department of Physics, University of Wisconsin September (1991–2011)
- Scientist, Max-Planck Institut für Extraterrestrische Physik Garching bei München, F.R. Germany (July 1985-January 1991)
- Guest Scientist, Max-Planck Institut für Extraterrestrische Physik Garching bei München, F.R. Germany (on leave from METU, Ankara) (July 1983 - July 1985)
- Professor, Physics Department, Middle East Technical University (METU) Ankara, Turkey (February 1970 - July 1985)
- Dean, Faculty of Basic Sciences, Çukurova University, Adana, Turkey (on leave from METU, Ankara) (September 1978 - June 1981)
- National Academy Sciences Senior Research Associate at Goddard Space Flight Center (on leave from METU, Ankara) (September 1974 - September 1975)
- National Academy Sciences Research Associate at Goddard Space Flight Center (September 1967 - January 1970)

== Awards, prizes and honors ==
- Sedat Simavi Prize, 1988
- Turkish Scientific and Technical Research Council Science Prize, 1991

== Selected publications ==
- Achterberg, A., Ogelman, H.; et al. (February 2008). "The search for muon neutrinos from northern hemisphere gamma-ray bursts with AMANDA". Astrophysical Journal. 674 (1): 357–370. arXiv:0705.1186. Bibcode:2008ApJ...674..357A. doi:10.1086/524920. S2CID 19937691.
- Ackermann, T. Ogelman, H.; et al. (January 2006). "Limits to the muon flux from neutralino annihilations in the sun with the AMANDA detector". Astroparticle Physics. 24 (6): 459–466. arXiv:astro-ph/0508518. Bibcode:2006APh....24..459A. doi:10.1016/j.astropartphys.2005.09.006. S2CID 11288592.
- Ahrens, J., Ogelman, H.; et al. (April 2004). "Status of the IceCube neutrino observatory - 2nd VERITAS symposium on the astrophysics of extragalactic sources, April 24-26, 2003". New Astronomy Reviews. 48 (5–6): 519–525. Bibcode:2004NewAR..48..519A. doi:10.1016/j.newar.2003.12.031.
- Alpar, M., Ogelman, H., Shaham, J. (June 1993). "Is Geminga A Glitching Pulsar". Astronomy and Astrophysics. 273 (1): L35–L37. Bibcode:1993A&A...273L..35A.
- Ayasli, S., Ogelman, H. (April 1980). "Gamma-rays from pulsars". Astrophysical Journal. 237 (1): 227–235. Bibcode:1980ApJ...237..227A. doi:10.1086/157862.
- Balman, S., Orio, M., Ogelman, H. (August 1995). "ROSAT observation of the old classical nova CP Puppis". The Astrophysical Journal. 449 (1): L47–L50. Bibcode:1995ApJ...449L..47B. doi:10.1086/309628.
- Baykal, A., Ogelman, H. (1993). "An empirical torque noise and spin-up model for accretion-powered x-ray pulsars". Astronomy and Astrophysics. 267 (1): 119–125. Bibcode:1993A&A...267..119B.
- Bignami, G., Fichtel, C., Hartman, R., Kniffen, D., Ogelman, H., Thompson, D., Ozel, M., Tümer, T. (January 1975). "High-energy galactic gamma-radiation from Sas-2 satellite". Bulletin of the American Physical Society. 20 (4): 656.
- Brinkmann, W., Ogelman, H. (August 1987). "Soft x-ray observations of the radio pulsar PSR-1055-52". Astronomy and Astrophysics. 182 (1): 71–74. Bibcode:1987A&A...182...71B.
- Buccheri, R., Ogelman, H. (January 1988). "Two neutrino periodicities from supernova 1987A". Nature. 331 (6154): 309–310. Bibcode:1988Natur.331..309O. doi:10.1038/331309d0. S2CID 4283270.
- Fichtel, C., Hartman, R., Kniffen, D., Thompson, D., Bignami, G., Ogelman, H., Ozel, M., Tümer, T. (May 1975). "High-energy gamma-ray results from second small astronomy satellite". Astrophysical Journal. 198 (1): 163–182. Bibcode:1975ApJ...198..163F. doi:10.1086/153590. hdl:2060/19740027105.
- Fichtel, C., Hartman, R., Kniffen, D., Thompson, D., Ogelman, H., Ozel, M., Tümer, T. (October 1977). "SAS-2 Observations of the diffuse gamma-radiation in the galactic latitude interval 10-degrees less than (B) less than or equal to 90-degrees". Astrophysical Journal. 217 (1): L9–L13. Bibcode:1977ApJ...217L...9F. doi:10.1086/182528.
- Finley, J., Ogelman, H. (October 1994). "The PSR 1800-21/G8.7-0.1 association - a view from ROSAT". Astrophysical Journal. 434 (1, Part 2): L25–L28. Bibcode:1994ApJ...434L..25F. doi:10.1086/187563.
- Gurkan, M., Baykal, A., Alpar, M., Ogelman, H., Strohmayer, T. (April 2000). "Post-glitch RXTE-PCA observations of the Vela pulsar". Astronomy & Astrophysics. 356 (3): 1136–1140. Bibcode:2000A&A...356.1136G.
- Hartman, R., Kniffen, D., Thompson, D., Fichtel, C., Ogelman, H., Tümer, T., Ozel, M. (June 1979). "Galactic plane gamma-radiation". Astrophysical Journal. 230 (2): 597–606. Bibcode:1979ApJ...230..597H. doi:10.1086/157118. hdl:2060/19790010706.
- Kiziloglu, U., Derman, E., Ogelman, H., Tokdemir, F. (June 1983). "Ultraviolet observations of AR-Lacertae". Astronomy and Astrophysics. 123 (1): 17–21. Bibcode:1983A&A...123...17K.
- Kniffen, D., Hartman, R., Thompson, D., Bignami, G., Fichtel, C., Tümer, T., Ogelman, H. (October 1974). "Gamma radiation from the Crab Nebula above 35 MeV". Nature. 251 (5474): 397–399. Bibcode:1974Natur.251..397K. doi:10.1038/251397a0. hdl:2060/19740024128. S2CID 4255664.
- Krautter, J.; Ogelman, H.; Starrfield, S.; Wichmann, R.; Pfeffermann, E. (January 1996). "ROSAT X-Ray Observations of Nova V1974 Cygni: the rise and fall of the brightest supersoft x-ray source". Astrophysical Journal. 456 (2, Part 1): 788–797. Bibcode:1996ApJ...456..788K. doi:10.1086/176697.
- Maran, S., Ogelman, H. (October 1969). "Pulsar periods and rapid changes in terrestrial rotation rate". Nature. 224 (5217): 349. Bibcode:1969Natur.224..349M. doi:10.1038/224349a0. S2CID 4172553.
- Markwardt, C., Ogelman, H. (May 1995). "An x-ray jet from the Vela pulsar". Nature. 375 (6526): 40–42. Bibcode:1995Natur.375...40M. doi:10.1038/375040a0. S2CID 4343974.
- Ogelman, H. (February 1969). "Discrete source interpretation of recent high energy cosmic gamma ray measurements". Nature. 221 (5182): 753–754. Bibcode:1969Natur.221..753O. doi:10.1038/221753a0. S2CID 4282544.
- Ogelman, H. (December 1970). "Extensive air shower arrays as detectors of prompt gamma rays from supernovae explosions". Nature. 228 (5277): 1181. Bibcode:1970Natur.228.1181O. doi:10.1038/2281181a0. PMID 16058852. S2CID 4286836.
- Ogelman, H. (June 1973). "Millisecond time scale atmospheric light pulses associated with solar and magnetospheric activity". Journal of Geophysical Research. 78 (16): 3033–3039. Bibcode:1973JGR....78.3033O. doi:10.1029/JA078i016p03033.
- Ogelman, H. (December 1993). "ROSAT observations of single pulsars". Advances in Space Research. 13 (12): 135–137. Bibcode:1993AdSpR..13l.135O. doi:10.1016/0273-1177(93)90105-k.
- Ogelman, H., Fichtel, C., Kniffen, D. (May 1975). "Observations of low-energy gamma-ray bursts with Sas-2". Nature. 255 (5505): 208–210. Bibcode:1975Natur.255..208O. doi:10.1038/255208b0. S2CID 4215489.
- Ogelman, H., Finley, J., Zimmermann, H. (January 1993). "Pulsed x-rays from the Vela pulsar". Nature. 361 (6408): 136–138. Bibcode:1993Natur.361..136O. doi:10.1038/361136a0. S2CID 4332537.
- Ogelman, H., Orio, M., Krautter, J., Starrfield, S. (January 1993). "Detection of supersoft x-ray emission from GQ-Muscae nine years after a nova outburst". Nature. 361 (6410): 331–333. Bibcode:1993Natur.361..331O. doi:10.1038/361331a0. S2CID 25251311.
- Ogelman, H., Sobieski, S. (July 1969). "Search for ultra-short light pulses from pulsars". Nature. 223 (5201): 47–48. Bibcode:1969Natur.223...47O. doi:10.1038/223047a0. S2CID 4273428.
- Ogelman, H., Swank, J. (December 1974). "Neutron stars with main-sequence binary companions as low luminosity x-ray sources". Astronomy and Astrophysics. 37 (1): 101–104. Bibcode:1974A&A....37..101O.
- Ogelman, H., Tepedelenlioglu, E. (2004). "Chandra observations of two pulsars PSR 0628-28 and PSR 1813-36". Advances in Space Research. 33 (4): 597–600. arXiv:astro-ph/0212017. Bibcode:2004AdSpR..33..597O. doi:10.1016/j.asr.2003.02.018. S2CID 5858088.
- Ogelman, H., Zimmermann, H. (April 1989). "Soft x-ray observations of the VELA pulsar PSR 0833-45". Astronomy and Astrophysics. 214 (1–2): 179–185. Bibcode:1989A&A...214..179O.
- Orio, M., Balman, S., DellaValle, M., Gallagher, J., Ogelman, H. (July 1996). "X-ray emission of nova Puppis 1991: accretion or a shocked shell?". Astrophysical Journal. 466 (1, Part 1): 410–414. Bibcode:1996ApJ...466..410O. doi:10.1086/177520.
- Seward, F., Alpar, M., Flanagan, C., Kiziloglu, U., Markwardt, C., Mcculloch, P., Ogelman, H. (June 2000). "ROSAT observations of the Vela pulsar". Astrophysical Journal. 536 (2): 948–953. arXiv:astro-ph/0004015. Bibcode:2000ApJ...536..948S. doi:10.1086/308961. S2CID 16143980.
- Tepedelenlioglu, E., Ogelman, H. (April 2007). "Discovery of extended emission around the pulsar B0355+54". Astrophysical Journal. 658 (2): 1183–1187. arXiv:astro-ph/0512209. Bibcode:2007ApJ...658.1183T. doi:10.1086/510995. S2CID 122050184.
- Thompson, D., Bailes, M., Bertsch, D., Cordes, J., D'Amico, N., Esposito, J., Finley, J., Hartman, R., Hermsen, W., Kanbach, G., Kaspi, V., Kniffen, D., Kuiper, L., Lin, Y., Lyne, A., Manchester, R., Matz, S., Mayer-Hasselwander, H., Michelson, P., Nolan, P., Ogelman, H., Pohl, M., Ramanamurthy, P., Sreekumar, P., Reimer, O., Taylor, J., Ulmer, M. (May 1999). "Gamma radiation from PSR B1055-52". Astrophysical Journal. 516 (1): 297–306. arXiv:astro-ph/9811219. Bibcode:1999ApJ...516..297T. doi:10.1086/307083. S2CID 59500284.
- Trumper, J., Kahabka, P., Ogelman, H., Pietsch, W., Voges, W. (January 1986). "EXOSAT observations of the 35 day cycle of Hercules X-1 - evidence for neutron-star precession". Astrophysical Journal. 300 (2, Part 2): L63–L67. Bibcode:1986ApJ...300L..63T. doi:10.1086/184604.
- Tümer, T., Gordon, E., Hamilton, W., Hurley, K., Maeding, D., Mohanty, G., Ogelman, H., Paulos, R., Puetter, R., Souchkov, V., Zweerink, J. (December 1999). "Preliminary test results of pixel detectors developed for the All-sky X-ray and Gamma-ray Astronomy Monitor (AXGAM)". 1999 IEEE Nuclear Science Symposium. Conference Record. 1999 Nuclear Science Symposium and Medical Imaging Conference (Cat. No.99CH37019). Vol. 2. pp. 626–632. doi:10.1109/NSSMIC.1999.845748. ISBN 978-0-7803-5696-2. S2CID 110962241.
- Yegingil, I., Ogelman, H., Kiziloglu, N. (1980). "Investigation of sodium in the upper atmosphere". Journal of Geophysical Research: Oceans. 85 (C10): 5507–5510. Bibcode:1980JGR....85.5507Y. doi:10.1029/JC085iC10p05507.
