= Haydar Saltık =

Turkish general

Commander of the First Army of Turkey
- In office 25 August 1981 – 22 August 1983
- Preceded by: Necdet Üruğ
- Succeeded by: Necdet Öztorun

Commander of the Turkish Army
- In office 6 December 1983 – 12 August 1985
- President: Kenan Evren
- Preceded by: Necdet Üruğ
- Succeeded by: Necdet Öztorun

Personal details
- Born: 23 April 1923 Istanbul
- Died: 8 April 2011 (aged 87)

Military service
- Allegiance: Turkey
- Branch/service: Turkish Army
- Rank: General

Ali Haydar Saltık (1923, Istanbul – 8 April 2011) was a Turkish general. He was Commander of the First Army of Turkey (1981 – 1983) and then Commander of the Turkish Army (1983 – 1985). He was Secretary-General of the Presidential Council.

In September 1979 General Kenan Evren ordered a hand-written report from Saltık on whether or not a coup was in order, or if the government merely needed a stern warning. The report, which recommended preparing for a coup, was delivered in six months. Evren kept the report in his office safe, and launched the 1980 Turkish coup d'état.
