= Hanife Çetiner =

Turkish fashion designer

- Born: 06/14/1938; Çanakkale, Turkey
- Died: 10 January 2011 (aged 72–73); İzmir, Turkey
- Occupation: Fashion designer

Hanife Çetiner (14 June 1938 – 10 January 2011) was a Turkish fashion designer.

An art and home economics teacher, Çetiner started her career in fashion in 1990 and gained significant popularity over the next decade by making couture women's bridal and evening gowns in her workshop. Subsequently Çetiner became the principal designer for the 67th Miss Turkey competition, creating 134 outfits for the various beauty pageant contestants. She is considered ahead of her time in the use of sustainable fashion when the concept was not yet fully developed in the early 1990s. In her designs Çetiner frequently used textiles handwoven by women from small villages in Turkey, or repurposed embroidery pieces from antique Ottoman Empire clothing. She was passionate about supporting women and introducing the rich culture of Anatolia by creating responsible fashion. She frequently combined traditional and modern and fused old with the new. Her designs were showcased at competitions such as Miss Universal, Miss World, Miss Europe, and Miss International. A number of them won the "Best In Evening Gown" and "National Costume" awards, 9 and 4 times in total respectively. In 1998, she organized the first ever fashion show in Şırnak and exhibited a collection of her shawls under the title "İzmir'den Şırnak'a Sevgi Bağları".

Hanife Çetiner died on 10 January 2011 in İzmir after suffering a heart attack. Her body was interred at the Balçova Upper Cemetery.

Also an avid environmentalist, Hanife Çetiner supported many charitable organizations. For example, in 1995, together with Ege Orman (Forestry) Foundation she launched the charity event 'Ateşsiz Piknik' (Fire-free Picnic) to prevent forest fires. Starting from May, each year she tried to spread the news about this event by organizing picnics with different NGOs and schools.
