= Berrin Menderes =

Wife of Turkish prime minister Adnan Menderes (1905–1994)

- Born: Fatma Berrin; 1905; İzmir, Ottoman Empire
- Died: April 22, 1994 (aged 88–89); Ankara, Turkey
- Years active: 1931–1961
- Spouse: Adnan Menderes (m. 1928; d. 1961)
- Children: Yüksel; Mutlu; Aydın

Fatma Berrin Menderes (1905 – April 22, 1994) was the wife of Adnan Menderes, the ninth prime minister of Turkey.

== Life ==
In 1905, Evliyazade Hacı Mehmet Efendi's daughter Evliyazade Naciye Hanım and Yemişçibaşı İzzet Bey's youngest child came to the world in İzmir. Berrin Menderes married Adnan Menderes in 1928. In 1931, her husband was elected as a member of the Republican People's Party (CHP), the only political party at the time. After this, their children Yüksel (1930–1972), Mutlu (1937–1978) and Aydın (1946–2011) came to the world in Ankara.

Her husband Adnan Menderes became prime minister after the Democratic Party (DP) came to power in 1950. Adnan Menderes, who served as prime minister for 10 years, was arrested on May 27, 1960, when the DP was removed from power. He was executed on 17 September 1961 in İmralı Island. Berrin Menderes lost her eldest son, Yüksel Menderes, in 1972. After her older sister Güzin Dülger died in 1975 and her middle son Mutlu died in 1978, she continued her life with her younger son Aydın. His brother Samim Yemişçibaşı died in 1985.

== Death ==
On April 22, 1994, when she was 88 years old, she lost her life in Ankara due to heart attack and kidney failure. The funeral was brought to Istanbul and buried at the mausoleum of Topkapı where Adnan Menderes was buried.
