= Kaşif Kozinoğlu =

Turkish intelligence official

Kaşif Kozinoğlu (1955, Trabzon – 13 November 2011, Istanbul) was a senior Turkish intelligence official in the National Intelligence Organization (MIT). He died of an apparent heart attack in prison, shortly before he was due to give evidence in the Ergenekon trials, in which he was considered a suspect. His death was considered suspicious and investigated by prosecutors.

== Career ==
Kozinoğlu graduated from the Turkish Military Academy in 1976, joining the Army's Special Warfare Department in 1980. He was part of this department and its Special Forces Command successor until his retirement in 1995, when he joined the National Intelligence Organization (MIT). He served abroad in locations including Bosnia, Syria and Afghanistan and became head of the Asia Region. In 1986 he helped train police special forces, and in 1987 helped set up MIT's first foreign department.

He was arrested in 2011 on charges of passing information to odatv.com, which prosecutors allege is part of Ergenekon. He told prosecutors that he had been in contact with Alaettin Çakıcı as part of an attempt to prevent an assassination of a high-profile politician. Mehmet Eymür told Ergenekon prosecutors that Kozinoğlu had ordered the assassination of Kurdish politician Murat Bozlak, while Akın Birdal has suggested Kozinoğlu was part of the team which attempted to assassinate him in 1998. Kozinoğlu is said to have monitored MIT chief Hakan Fidan.
