= Kaya Köstepen =

Turkish footballer (1934–2011)

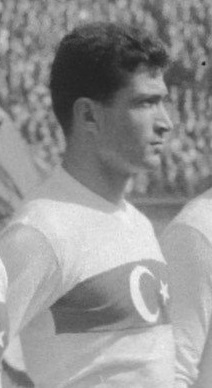

Personal information
- Date of birth: 12 December 1934
- Place of birth: Aydın, Turkey
- Date of death: 29 June 2011 (aged 76)
- Place of death: Istanbul, Turkey
- Position: Midfielder

Senior career*
Years	Team	Apps	(Gls)
1955–1957	Altay		
1957–1970	Beşiktaş	322	(7)

International career
1958–1963	Turkey	4	(0)

Managerial career
- 1974: Beşiktaş (interim)
- * Club domestic league appearances and goals

Kaya Köstepen (12 December 1934 – 29 June 2011) was a Turkish football player who played club football for Altay and Beşiktaş. He was born in Aydın. He also earned four caps for the Turkey national team.

Köstepen died on 29 June 2011 in Istanbul.
