= Nurettin Ersin =

18th Chief of the General Staff of the Turkish Armed Forces (1918-2005)

18th General Commander of the Gendarmerie of Turkey
- In office 22 August 1975 – 5 January 1976
- Preceded by: Orhan Yiğit
- Succeeded by: Şahap Yardımoğlu

Chief of the General Staff of Turkey
- In office 1 July 1983 – 6 December 1983
- Preceded by: Kenan Evren
- Succeeded by: Necdet Üruğ

Commander of the Turkish Army
- In office 9 March 1978 – 1 July 1983
- Preceded by: Kenan Evren
- Succeeded by: Necdet Üruğ

Personal details
- Born: 1918 Gelibolu, Ottoman Empire
- Died: 3 October 2005 (aged 86–87) Ankara, Turkey
- Education: Turkish Military Academy

Military service
- Allegiance: Turkey
- Branch/service: Turkish Land Forces
- Rank: General

Nurettin Ersin (1918 – 3 October 2005) was a Turkish general.

He was the Commander of the 4th Infantry Division in 1969-70; Commander of the 6th Corps during the 1974 invasion of Cyprus, and the Commander of the Turkish Army during the 1980 Turkish coup d'état. After the coup he was a member of the Presidential Council, and was Chief of the General Staff of Turkey in the second half of 1983.

Ersin, who was born in Çanakkale, was also head of the National Intelligence Organization (2 August 1971 – 25 July 1973), Secretary General of the National Security Council (5 January 1976 – 30 August 1977), and Commander of the First Army of Turkey (30 August 1977 – 8 March 1978).
