= Defne Joy Foster =

Turkish actress and presenter (1975–2011)

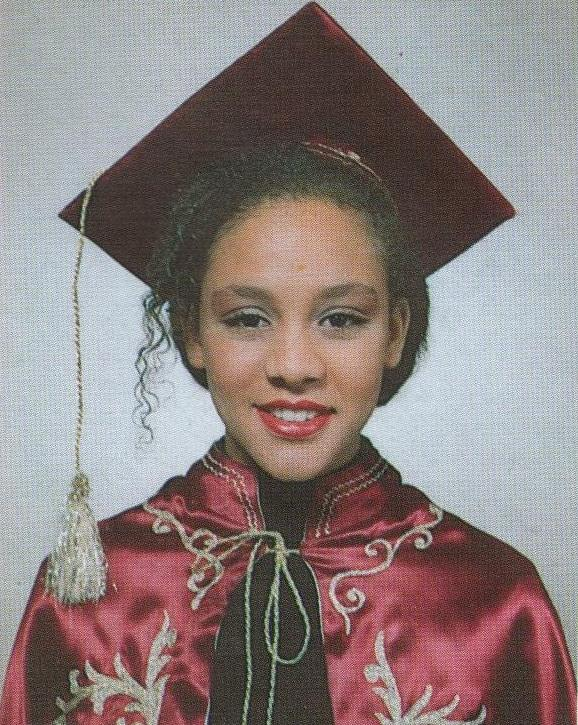
- From high school graduation, 1992
- Born: September 2, 1975; İncirlik, Turkey
- Died: February 2, 2011 (aged 35); Istanbul, Turkey
- Resting place: Zincirlikuyu Cemetery
- Occupations: Actress, presenter, VJ
- Years active: 1996–2011
- Notable work: Sihirli Annem
- Spouse: İlker Yasin Solmaz (m. 2008)
- Children: 1

Defne Joy Foster (September 2, 1975 – February 2, 2011) was an American-Turkish actress, presenter and VJ.

== Biography ==
Defne Joy Foster was born in Adana, Turkey. She was born to her Turkish mother Hatice from İzmir, Turkey and American father Steve. Defne (occasionally rendered as "Daphne" or "Daphné" in some sources) did her studies in Alsancak primary school and at İzmir Özel Fatih Lisesi, a private school, also in İzmir. Foster married Yasin Solmaz in 2008 and gave birth to only child of couple, male, Can Kılıç in 2009.

=== Death ===
Foster was found dead at her friend Kerem Altan's apartment in Istanbul on February 2, 2011. She was thought to have died from respiratory difficulty and a heart attack. The results of her autopsy was cardiac arrest caused by asthma and consumption of alcoholic drinks with medication. In February 2015, Kerem Altan was sentenced to two months in prison for waiting over two and a half hours after Foster fell unconscious before calling emergency services, however his sentence was suspended shortly after. Altan's statements were also contradictory to the forensic investigation. According to the investigators there was a total of four people in the house on the night of Foster's death, while Altan stated he and Foster were the only people home. Furthermore, according to Altan's testimony he did not have a sexual act with Foster during the night yet Foster's bottom underwear were found near the bed.

In 2016, further investigation into her death revealed that Kerem Altan was the only person whose testimony was taken by the police despite the taxi driver who brought the two home and the neighbor saying they had heard fighting and screams. A Ahmet Altan has been arrested in 2016 and the case has been reopened into the death of Foster, while a travel ban is placed on Kerem to prevent him from fleeing the country.

== Career ==
Foster first appeared on TV screens as a VJ on Kral TV and later went into acting on various TV series. She last participated in Yok Böyle Dans, the Turkish version of Dancing with the Stars, where she finished 4th, having been eliminated in January 2011.

=== Television ===
Year	Title	Role	Notes
2000	Beyaz Yalanlar	Ahu	TV series
2000	Dadı	Defne	TV series
2001	Ruhsar		TV series
2003	Sihirli Annem	Eda	TV series
2006	Selena	Pandora	TV series
2007	Hayal ve Gerçek	Gizem	TV series
2010	Yok Böyle Dans	Herself	Reality show
