= Tahsin Şahinkaya =

Turkish general (1925–2015)

Commander of the Turkish Air Force
- In office 21 August 1978 – 6 December 1983
- Preceded by: Ethem Ayan
- Succeeded by: Halil Sözer

Personal details
- Born: 1 May 1925 Merzifon, Turkey
- Died: 9 July 2015 (aged 90) Istanbul, Turkey
- Resting place: Karacaahmet Cemetery

Military service
- Allegiance: Turkey
- Branch/service: Turkish Air Force
- Years of service: 1943–1983
- Rank: General

Tahsin Şahinkaya (1 May 1925 – 9 July 2015) was a Turkish Air Force general. After completing his compulsory military service in the Turkish Army Artillery between 1943 and 1945, he was commissioned as a Supermarine Spitfire pilot in the Air Force. From 1955 he flew the North American F-86 Sabre and was a squadron commander from 1958 to 1961. In 1960 he also qualified as a pilot for the North American F-100 Super Sabre. Promoted to colonel in 1962, he commanded a regiment of Sabrejet fighters between 1962 and 1964 and a regiment of Super Sabre fighters from 1966 to 1968. Between 1964 and 1966 he was an instructor at the Air Warfare School. Promoted to brigadier general in 1968 and appointed as the air attaché to Israel till 1971. From 1971 to 1974 he was deputy director of air planning as a staff officer. Promoted to major general in 1974 and commanded all Turkish Air Force units in the Cyprus War. In 1976 promoted to lieutenant general and chief of Air Training Command. In 1978 became commander of the First Air Force. In 1979 a full general. He was Commander of the Turkish Air Force from 1978 to 1983, and previously secretary-general of the National Security Council (1977–1978). He was one of the five leaders of the 1980 military coup, and after the coup he was a member of the Presidential Council.

In 2012, a court case was launched against Şahinkaya and Kenan Evren relating to the 1980 military coup. Both were sentenced to life imprisonment on 18 June 2014 by a court in Ankara, the capital of Turkey. After having been sentenced he was not sent to prison as he was in medical treatment for several illnesses at the Gülhane Military Research Hospital (GATA) in Ankara and later on also in Istanbul.

== Death ==
Şahinkaya died at age 90 in the Gülhane Military Medical Academy (GATA) in Haydarpaşa, Istanbul on July 9, 2015. He was interred at Karacaahmet Cemetery on July 11 following a memorial ceremony held at the Turkish First Army headquarters in the Selimiye Barracks and subsequent religious funeral service at the nearby Big Selimiye Mosque in Üsküdar. He was survived by his wife Sema, son Serdar, daughter Sevgi Kartal and son-in-law Mustafa Kartal.
