= Menderes Utku =

Turkish actor and businessman (born 1963)

- Born: May 5, 1963 (age 63)
- Citizenship: Turkey
- Years active: 1970–present

Menderes Utku (born May 5, 1963) is a Turkish actor and businessman. He is known for the 1970s films in the Afacan series.

== Early life ==
He is the son of producer, director and screenwriter Ümit Utku. He was named Best Child Actor at the 8th Golden Orange Film Festival for Afacan Küçük Serseri (1972) and at the 10th Golden Orange Film Festival for Afacan Harika Çocuk (1973).

== Career ==
In 1991, together with Bülent Özler, he was part of the Turkish team that won the Camel Trophy in Tanzania and Burundi.

In 2001, together with Muzaffer Yıldırım, he founded Mars Entertainment Group, working in movie production, distribution, and screening.

In 2020, it acquired Kronotrop Coffee & Roastery.

== Personal life ==
In 2022 he married Sura Zaatari from Lebanon.
