= Hasan Mutlucan =

Turkish singer (1926–2011)

- Born: 3 March 1926; İzmir, Turkey
- Died: 28 December 2011 (aged 85) Istanbul, Turkey
- Genres: Turkish folk music; Mehter; Ottoman music; national anthem
- Occupation: Bağlama

Hasan Mutlucan (born 1 March 1926 – 28 December 2011) was a Turkish folk music (türkü) singer.

== Life and career ==
Mutlucan was born on 1 March 1926 in İzmir. His father died when he was six. In Istanbul, he began working in a theatre group as an assistant decorator. Soon, he took several small roles, but he preferred a music career. In the late 1940s, he attended the conservatoire of the Istanbul municipality. With his exceptionally low bass voice, he was offered a position in the opera, but he preferred to sing folk songs. Among the folk songs, especially those with epic lyrics, were his favorites. After 1973, he began singing epic-style songs in Turkish Radio and Television Corporation. After the 1980 Turkish coup d'état, his songs were played so often that he was nicknamed the "singer of the coup", though he rigorously denied any association to military government and announced that he was a democrat. After retirement, he lived mostly in İzmir.

== Death ==
He died on 28 December 2011 in Istanbul.

== Album discography ==
Year	Name
1974	Kahramanlık Türküleri
1975	Kahramanlık Türküleri Vol 2
1975	Hasan Mutlucan
1976	Serhat Türküleri
?	Yiğitler silkinip ata binende
1998	Efe Türküleri Zeybekler
?	Eşkiya Dünyaya Hükümdar Olmaz
