= Ezginin Günlüğü =

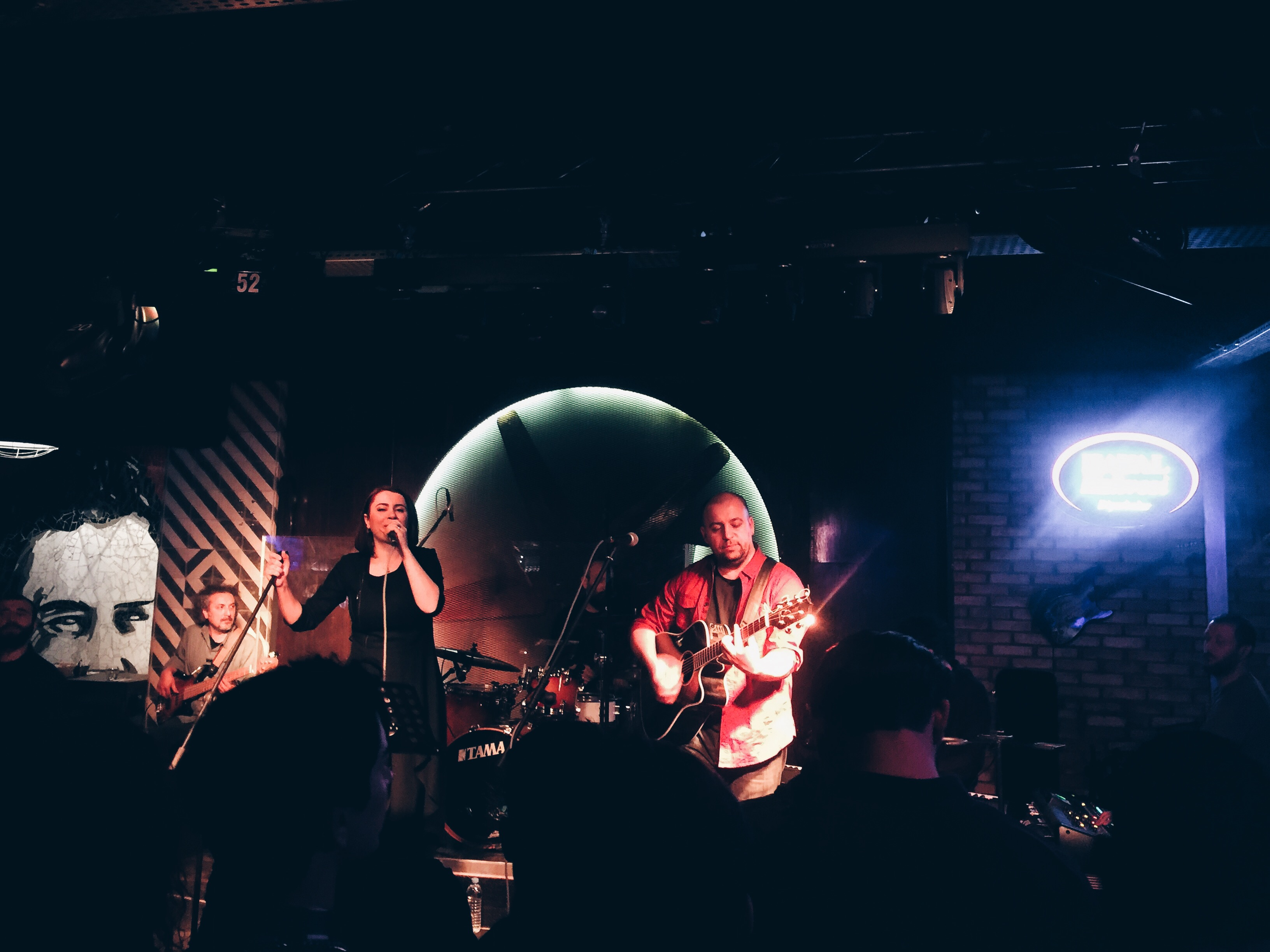
- Ezginin Günlüğü in Diyarbakir, 2017

Background information
- Origin: Istanbul, Turkey
- Genres: Indie folk; folk
- Years active: 1982–present
- Members: Nadir Göktürk; Deniz Sujana; Mahmut Çınar; Can Göktürk; Deniz Bayrak; Erkan Gürer; Cafer İşleyen; Güven Şancı
- Website: Group Web Site

Ezginin Günlüğü (Melody's Diary in Turkish) is a Turkish band formed in 1982 in Istanbul by Emin İgüs, Hakan Yılmaz, Şebnem Başar, Tugay Başar, and Vedat Verter. Shortly after its foundation, three new members joined the band: Nadir Göktürk, Tanju Duru, and Cüneyt Duru. They made their first concert in 1983. Their first album, Seni Düşünmek (To think of You), was released in 1985.

The original group dissolved itself in 1990, following personal disagreements on the kind of music different members wanted to make. However, Nadir Göktürk, without the approval of the other group members, brought in new members and continued to perform under the same name. Hüsnü Arkan and Fatih Saçlı have joined the band and the first album involving them, İstavrit, was released in 1993. The popularity of the band increased dramatically after the album Oyun released in 1995.

Ezginin Günlüğü is noted for their musical diversity and vocal harmonies. One of the strongest connections to their listeners is their use of the lyrics. In the 80s they were using well-known poems and singing songs with political allusions. In the 90s they were still using poems but they also started to write their own lyrics. Their music is based on Anatolian folk music, with a contemporary interpretation.

== Discography ==
- Seni Düşünmek ("To Think of You," 1985)
- Sabah Türküsü ("Morning Ballad," 1986)
- Alagözlü Yar ("Hazel-eyed Love," 1987)
- Bahçedeki Sandal ("The Boat in the Garden," 1988)
- Ölüdeniz ("Dead Sea," 1990)
- İstavrit ("Horse Mackerel," 1993)
- Oyun ("Game," 1995)
- Ebruli ("Variegated," 1996)
- Hürriyete Doğru ("Through to Freedom," 1997)
- Aşk Yüzünden ("Because of Love," 1998)
- Rüya ("Dream," 2000)
- Her Şey Yolunda ("Everything's Alright," 2002)
- İlk Aşk ("First Love," 2003)
- Dargın mıyız ("Are We Peeved," 2005)
- Çeyrek ("Quarter," 2007) (Tribute album. Ezginin Günlüğü songs by various Turkish artists)
- Eski Arkadaş ("Old Friend" 2010)
- İstanbul Gibi (2015)
- Aşk Zamanı (2018)
- 40 Yıllık Şarkılar ("Songs of 40 Years" 2020)

== Line up ==
=== Current members ===
- Nadir Göktürk - keyboards
- Deniz Sujana - vocals
- Mahmut Çınar - vocals
- Can Göktürk - woodwinds
- Deniz Bayrak - guitar
- Erkan Gürer - bass guitar
- Cafer İşleyen - flute, vocals
- Güven Şancı - drums

=== Former members ===
- Tanju Duru - guitar (d. October 2, 2008)
- Feyza Erenmemiş - vocals
- Emin İgüs - vocals
- Hakan Yılmaz - vocals
- Hüsnü Arkan - vocals
- Gülnaz Göver - vocals
- Sumru Ağıryürüyen - vocals
- Cüneyt Duru - bass guitar
- Vedat Verter - bağlama
- Göksun Doğan - clarinet
- Serdar Gönenç - drums
- Şebnem Başar - vocals
- Güneş Uras
- Cem Doğan
- İsmail Atalan
- Arzu Bursa - vocals
- Ebru Kalabas
- Fatih Saçlı - flute, saxophone
- Sedat Yapıcı - guitar
- Gökhan Tümkaya - drums
- Eylem Atmaca - vocals
- Çağrı Çetinsel - vocals
- Murat Kurt - guitar, vocals
- Cem Gezginti - drums
