= Sumner Starrfield =

American astronomer

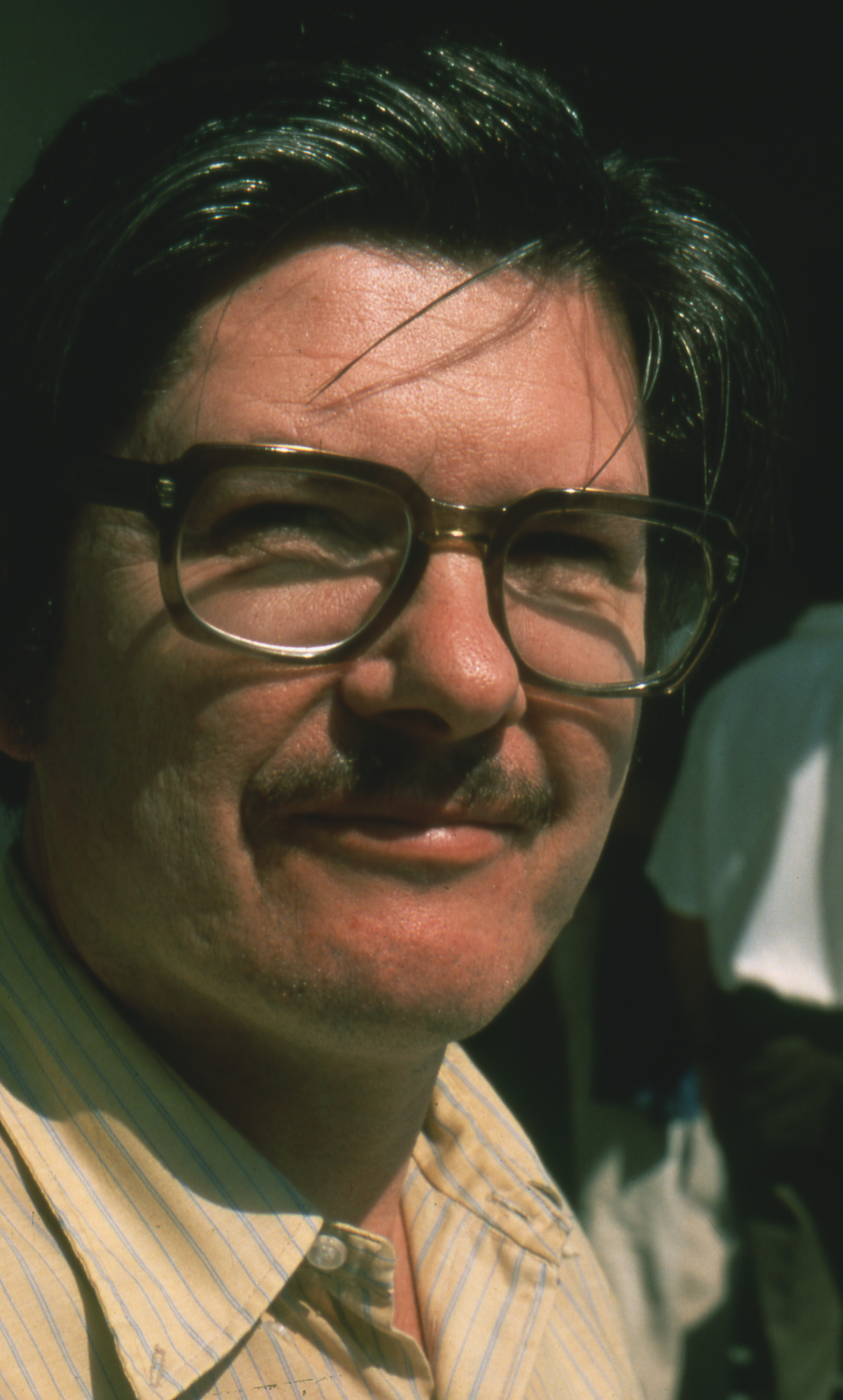
- Starrfield in 1976
- Born: Sumner Grosby Starrfield; December 29, 1940 (age 84)
- Education: University of California, Berkeley, University of California, Los Angeles
- Known for: nova outbursts
- Scientific career
- Fields: astrophysics
- Institutions: Arizona State University

Sumner Grosby Starrfield (born 29 December 1940) is an American astronomer.

Starrfield earned a bachelor's degree from the University of California, Berkeley and completed his master's and doctoral degrees at the University of California, Los Angeles. He began teaching at Arizona State University in 1972, and was later named a Regents' Professor at the institution. In 1999, Starrfield was elected a fellow of the American Physical Society "[f]or fundamental contributions to our understanding of the cause and evolution of the nova outburst involving forefront observational and theoretical studies of these explosions." From 2002 to 2005, Starrfield was head of the publication board for the American Astronomical Society, and later ran for the vice presidency.

Starrfield is married to Susan Lee Hutt, with whom he raised three children. The minor planet 19208 Starrfield is named for him.
