= Vedii Tosuncuk =

Turkish footballer

Personal information
- Date of birth: 1921
- Place of birth: Istanbul, Turkey
- Date of death: 10 May 2011 (aged 89–90)
- Place of death: Istanbul, Turkey

International career
| Years | Team | Apps | (Gls) |
- Turkey

Vedii Tosuncuk (1921 – 10 May 2011) was a Turkish footballer. He competed in the men's tournament at the 1948 Summer Olympics.

== Individual ==
- Beşiktaş J.K. Squads of Century (Silver Team)
