= Mustafa Haluk Güçlü =

Mustafa Haluk Güçlü (12 August 1951 – 18 August 2011) was a Turkish painter known for his paintings depicting Turkish culture and mythology. He was also known for being a portrait artist.

== Biography ==
=== Early life (1951–1970) ===
Güçlü, was born on the 12th of August 1951. At age 13, he created his first oil painting, titled “Winter in Erzurum,” painted on plywood. He was supported by his teacher, the painter Fuat İğdebeli, during his time at secondary school.

In 1968, Güçlü started working as a correspondent for a local newspaper. He painted made-to-order portraits and posters and paintings for display boards at fairs and festivals. His paintings were also sold for interior decorating and as window-shop decorations.

Güçlü met the painter Mehmet Sabir Bey and worked for more than five years. Güçlü created decorations for Erzurum Atatürk University Lounge, Hacıbaba Kebab Hall etc. and Erzurum Folk Dance Association's "Hurrem Sultan", “IV. Murat “, and” Köroğlu” theatre decorations.

=== Philosophy education (1970–1984) ===
In the 1970s, while working as the publishing editor of the East Express newspaper, Güçlü drew daily stencil drawings. He met Ali Karaavcı from whom he received a philosophy education. Güçlü created paintings of local scenes, including Red Fountain, Leman, Çaykara, Emirgan, Karadeniz Tea Garden, Musalla Stone, Hülya, Serçeme Deresi, and Yakutiye.

Güçlü's paintings would include philosophical interpretations like Garibanam, Passion, Ambush, Deli Nazım, Sarıgelin, Kuşbaz, Devlerin Aşkı, Nene, and Ali Karaavcı. He held his first exhibitions during these years. He also made the decorations of Erzurum Television.

Guclu started his civil service in the Ministry of Culture and continued in Turkish Radio and Television. He created and exhibited large-sized paintings such as, “The Birth of the Turkish Flag”, “Departure of Turks from Ergenekon”, “The Epic of Kürşad's Revolution”, “100 Great Turkish.”

In the 1980s, his paintings were banned and subsequently removed from public display, to be destroyed.

=== İstanbul (1984–1990) ===
Guclu painted the Sarıkamış Battleground during his compulsory military service as a lieutenant in the Turkish military. After 1980, he moved to İstanbul, where he produced illustrations, paintings, logos, graphic designs and book covers.

Güçlü founded a publishing house, and published the philosophical books (Judgment, Passion, Invocation) of his tutor Ali Karaavcı. He built a Turkish style cute restaurant (Young Buffet) near the Üsküdar wharf, and restored Ilıca Touristic Hotel belonging to the municipality and the Historical Mansion.

=== Turkish World (1990–1995) ===
Guclu spent three years preparing for the children's animation project "Ti“in-Flash Khan". However, his work was not completed.

Güçlü he turned to painting again. Despair of Turkish Thinker 68x98 cm, Lambs 100x71 cm, Schizophrenia 100x64cm, Rough Black Sea 100x71 cm, Pamukbaba 70x50 cm, Heva-i Nefs 100x140 cm, Fire Dance 100x70 cm, Synthesis 100x140 cm, Three Girls One Mother 114x94 cm are his works he created in this period.

=== Inner Realism (1995) ===
Guclu held many exhibitions in Antalya, Ankara and Erzurum. He published a declaration of the art movement "Inner Realism" at the Ömer Sunar Art Gallery in Ankara on August 4, 1995. He briefly presented his views on art with this manifesto to the public. He exhibited over 500 works with his philosophy of "Art is for the created deriving from God".

=== The Hands reaching towards the Art (1996-1999) ===
On 4 December 1995 Ali Karaavcı died. Güçlü commemorated him with an exhibition in Erzurum in March 1996. He published a catalog containing as many as one hundred paintings In June 1996. In the same year, he started to work as a lecturer in Atatürk University Fine Arts Faculty.

Guclu activated the painting workshop at the Culture Center in Erzurum. He held free courses there and opened a series of mixed and personal exhibitions under the name of " The Hands reaching towards the Art". In 1998, Güçlü held 'Atatürk with Portraits' exhibition Erzurum Painting and Sculpture Gallery where 17 paintings were displayed.

Güçlü worked as Erzurum Metropolitan Municipality Presidency of Culture and Art Consultant for two terms (1996–2000 and 2001–2004). Red Fountain, Aziziye, Nenehatun, İbrahim Hakkı Hz. Are the works of this period. The oil painting on the Commemorative Stamp of 300th Birthday of Erzurumlu İbrahim Hakkı is his work. His painting Aziziye 140x200cm is still hanging in the entrance hall of the Erzurum Metropolitan Municipality.

=== Turkish Mythology (2000-2004) ===
Güçlü concentrated to work on the Turkish Mythology. Alper Tunga in Otuken 100x100cm, A morning in Ergenekon 120x90cm, Migration Preparation 120x50cm, The Red Apple 70x100cm were painted in this term.

Güçlü's 19th personal exhibition was in Ankara in 2003, displaying a series of studies on superstitions. Udagan Kam, Vow Ceremony, Aşık Falı, Nazar Nene, Purification with Fire, Coffee Fortune-telling, The Peace Street, İje-Kil, The Portrait, In the Light of the Darkness are works of this period.

=== Last Period (2004-2011) ===
Guclu got cancer, his stomach was surgically removed in 2004. He kept working on his paintings despite his serious disease and pains. He held a painting exhibition in İzmir Painting-Sculpture Museum in commemoration of his painting teacher Mehmet Sabır in October 2006 in İzmir.

Güçlü staged 45 new works in his 21st personal exhibition "Gökçeada Landscapes" between 17 and 22 August 2008 as part of Gökçeada Movie Festival. Lastly, Guclu tried to complete 54 pieces of miniature paintings about Erzurumlu Emrah in his workshop.

Güçlü died in Ankara on 16 August 2011.
