= Aydın Menderes =

Turkish politician (1946–2011)

- Born: 5 May 1946; Ankara, Turkey
- Died: 23 December 2011 (aged 65); Ankara, Turkey
- Education: TED Ankara College
- Alma mater: Ankara Academy of Commerce and Economics
- Occupation: Politician
- Years active: 1970–2002
- Title: Member of the Grand National Assembly
- Term: 1977–1980; 1995–2002
- Political party: DP (1970–1977); AP (1977–1980); BDP (1993–1994); DP (1994–1995); RP (1995–1998); FP (1998–1999); DYP (2002–2007); DP (2007–2009)
- Spouse: Ümran Menderes
- Parent(s): Adnan Menderes; Berin Menderes
- Relatives: Mutlu; Yüksel; (siblings)

Aydın Menderes (5 May 1946 – 23 December 2011) was a Turkish politician. He was a deputy, who represented various parties from 1977 to 2002. He was the youngest son of former Prime Minister Adnan Menderes.

== Biography ==
Menderes was born in 1946 as the third son of Adnan and Berrin Menderes in Ankara. His father, who was the prime minister since 1950 in office, was ousted by the 1960 military coup, tried and executed in 1961 along with Fatin Rüştü Zorlu and Hasan Polatkan.

Following completion of his secondary education at the TED Ankara College in 1964, he attended Ankara Academy of Commerce and Economics, graduating in 1968. He entered trade business first, switched over to politics in 1970. In 1976, Aydın Menderes completed his military service at Iskenderun.

His brother Yüksel committed suicide in 1972, and the other brother Mutlu died in a traffic accident in 1978. Aydın Menderes became disabled following a traffic accident in 1996, and was reliant on a wheelchair since then.

He died on 23 December 2011 in a hospital in Ankara, where was treated for a long time. He was survived by his wife Ümran whom he married in 1991.

== Politics career ==
Aydın Menders entered politics as the leader of Democratic Party's Aydın Province organization in 1970. Following the 1977 general election, he entered the parliament as deputy of Konya Province from the Justice Party (AP).

He was among the politicians, who were banned from the active politics for a time of ten-years after the 1980 military coup. In 1993, he established the "Great Change Party" (BDP) and became its leader. In 1994, his party merged into the Democrat Party (DP), which was relaunched in 1992 after its closure in 1980. Aydın Menderes was elected its leader and served at this post until 1995.

at the 1995 general election, he was elected Deputy of Istanbul from the Islamist Welfare Party (RP). The next year, he became deputy party leader. After the ban of the party in 1998, Aydın Menderes shifted to Virtue Party (FP), another Islamist party, and was elected deputy of Istanbul Province in the 1999 general election. After a while, he resigned from the Virtue Party.

In the 2002 general election, he ran for a seat in the parliament from the True Path Party (DYP) in Aydın. However, the DYP failed to gain any seat in the parliament. In 2007, the DYP and the Motherland Party (ANAP) merged to form and to revive the Democratic Party (DP). Aydın Menderes quit the politics after Hüsamettin Cindoruk became leader of the party in May 2009.

== Writing career ==
In 2003, Aydın Menderes began to write for the newspaper Tercüman. He wrote later columns for the daily Yeni Asır.

Between 1987 and 2005, he published books on his political thoughts.

== Works ==
- Tarihte Bir Yolculuk (1987), Dergah Yayınları
- Aydın Menderes ve Siyasette Yeni Yönelişler (1992), Dergah Yayınları
- Yirmibirinci Yüzyıla Girerken Dünya ve Türkiye (1995, Demokrat Parti Yayınları
- Yirmibirinci Yüzyıla Girerken Demokrat Partinin Misyonu, Demokrat Parti Yayınları)
- Gelenekten Güncele (1999), Gün Yayıncılık
- Devletin Alınyazısı (2005), Kızılelma Yayınları
