= Sedat Celasun =

Turkish general

General Commander of the Gendarmerie of Turkey
- In office 25 August 1978 – 6 December 1983
- Preceded by: Şahap Yardımoğlu
- Succeeded by: Mehmet Buyruk

Personal details
- Born: 1915 Istanbul, Ottoman Empire
- Died: 17 July 1998

Military service
- Allegiance: Turkey
- Branch/service: Turkish Army
- Rank: General

Sedat Celasun (1915, in Istanbul – 17 July 1998) was a Turkish general. He was General Commander of the Gendarmerie of Turkey from 1978 to 1983. He was one of the five leaders of the 1980 military coup, and after the coup he was a member of the Presidential Council.
