= Kramp =

Kramp is a surname. Notable people with the surname include:

- Christian Kramp (1760–1826), French mathematician who worked primarily with factorials
- Daryl Kramp (1947–2024), Canadian politician
- Paul L. Kramp (1887–1975), Danish zoologist who worked extensively on jellyfish
