= Meral Menderes =

Turkish opera singer (1933–2011)

- Born: 1933; Kuşadası, Aydın Province, Turkey
- Died: 27 December 2011 (aged 77–78) Maltepe, Istanbul, Turkey
- Genres: Opera
- Occupation: soprano
- Years active: 1960–1990

Meral Menderes (1933 – 27 December 2011) was a Turkish opera singer as soprano.

== Early life ==
Meral Menderes was born in Kuşadası of Aydın Province, western Turkey in 1933. She took her first singing lessons from Münir Ceyhan at Istanbul Municipal Conservatory. She further was educated in the newly established Opera Studio. She was mentored by foreign and Turkish voice coaches.

== Career ==
Menderes debuted on stage on 19 March 1960 performing in the opera Tosca by Giacomo Puccini staged at the 1959-established Istanbul City Opera. Her next performance was in the opera Madama Butterfly by Puccini. Her further roles were as Santuzza in Cavalleria rusticana by Pietro Mascagni and in La bohème by Puccini. In Puccini's Turandot staged in Ankara, she played both the princess Turandot and the slave girl Liu. She performed in operas like Macbeth by Giuseppe Verdi, the role of Antonia in The Tales of Hoffmann by Jacques Offenbach, Un ballo in maschera by Verdi, The Bartered Bride by Bedřich Smetana and Il trovatore by Verdi.

She was known as a soprano with natural and sonorous voice in highest pitch vocal range. She was one of the first opera singers in the Republican era. She performed almost thirty years on stage.

In 2010, Menderes was honored for the 50th anniversary of the foundation of Istanbul Opera with the "Art Award" bestowed by Rengim Gökmen, the Director General of the Turkish State Opera and Ballet.

== Death ==
Meral Menderes died at age 78 in her home in Maltepe, Istanbul, on 27 December 2011. She was interred at Küçükyalı Cemetery after a memorial ceremony held at Süreyya Opera House and the religious funeral service at Maltepe Merkez Mosque.
