= Nejat Tümer =

Turkish admiral

Commander of the Turkish Naval Forces
- In office 10 August 1978 – 6 December 1983
- Preceded by: Bülend Ulusu
- Succeeded by: Zahit Atakan

Personal details
- Born: 1924 Istanbul, Turkey
- Died: May 29, 2011 (aged 87)

Military service
- Allegiance: Turkey
- Branch/service: Turkish Naval Forces
- Years of service: 1944 – 1983
- Rank: Admiral

Nejat Tümer (1924, Istanbul – 29 May 2011) was a Turkish admiral. He was Commander of the Turkish Naval Forces from 1980 to 1983. He was one of the five leaders of the 1980 military coup, and after the coup he was a member of the Presidential Council.
