= Kenan Evren =

7th President of Turkey from 1982 to 1989

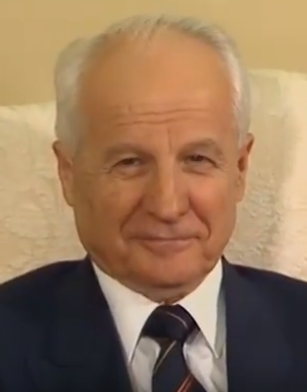
- Evren in 1988

7th President of Turkey
- In office 12 September 1980 – 9 November 1989 (Note: As Chairman of the National Security Council until 9 November 1982.)
- Prime Minister: Bülend Ulusu; Turgut Özal
- Preceded by: İhsan Sabri Çağlayangil (acting)
- Succeeded by: Turgut Özal

17th Chief of the General Staff of Turkey
- In office 7 March 1978 – 1 July 1983
- Preceded by: Semih Sancar
- Succeeded by: Nurettin Ersin

Commander of the Turkish Army
- In office 5 September 1977 – 6 March 1978
- Preceded by: Semih Sancar
- Succeeded by: Nurettin Ersin

Personal details
- Born: 17 July 1917 Alaşehir, Ottoman Empire
- Died: 9 May 2015 (aged 97) Ankara, Turkey
- Resting place: Turkish State Cemetery
- Spouse: Sekine Muslu (m. 1944; died 1982)
- Children: 4
- Education: Turkish Military Academy; Army War Institute
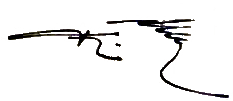
- Signature

Military service
- Allegiance: Turkey
- Branch/service: Turkish Land Forces
- Years of service: 1938–1983
- Rank: General
- Commands: 2nd Corps; Aegean Army; Turkish Land Forces; Turkish Armed Forces
- Battles/wars: Korean War; Operation Atilla

Ahmet Kenan Evren (Note: Turkish: [ceˈnan evˈɾɛn]) (17 July 1917 – 9 May 2015) was a Turkish military officer who served as the 7th president of Turkey from 1982 to 1989. He assumed the post by leading the 1980 military coup.

On 18 June 2014, a Turkish court sentenced him to life imprisonment and demotion of his military rank, (down to private from army general) for leading the military coup in 1980. He was found guilty of obstructing democracy by deposing the prime minister Süleyman Demirel and of abolishing the parliament, senate and the constitution. This sentence was under appeal at the time of his death.

== Early life ==
Ahmet Kenan Evren was born in Alaşehir, Manisa Province. His father, who was an imam, was of Albanian origins. He was originally from the town of Preševo and immigrated to Turkey to live with his uncle, who was in Istanbul. Kenan Evren's mother was from a Turkish Bulgarian background. After going to elementary school and middle school in Manisa, Balıkesir and Istanbul, he attended military high school in Maltepe, Ankara. In 1938, he graduated from army school and in 1949 from military academy as a staff officer.

From 1958 to 1959, he served in the Turkish Brigade in Korea. In 1964, he was promoted to general. Evren served at various posts as Army Chief. He was the commander of Operation Gladio's Turkish branch; the Counter-Guerrilla. The Counter-Guerrilla was an anti-communist "stay-behind" guerrilla force set up with the support of NATO. He became Chief of General Staff in March 1978. He was selected by then Prime Minister Bülent Ecevit for not being a member of any political group inside the Turkish Military

== 1980 military coup d'état ==
The years leading to the coup were characterized as a fierce struggle between the far-right and the far-left. Hoping to see a communist revolution, the leftist militants rioted in the streets; on the other hand, the right-wing nationalist militants fought back the left-wing revolutionaries and provoked religious division (similar to the Sunni-Shia conflict). Universities had taken sides and each became controlled by either the leftists or the rightists. The chaotic situation created by far-left and far-right groups had destroyed public security in the country. Communist and neo-fascist groups tried to keep neighborhoods under their control, beating or killing anyone who was not one of them. Finally, an anti-secularist rally organised by Islamists in Konya on 6 September 1980 was the last straw.

With the coup came the National Security Council as the ruling body. The council of 1980 was composed of the commanders Kenan Evren, the Chief of Staff and President of the State. The parliament was dissolved. On a speech in Muş in 1984, about the execution of Erdal Eren, a communist militant alleged 17-year-old but according to official records born in 1961 who was accused of killing a Turkish soldier, he said "Let's hang two of them in the Freedom Square and see if they can do it again. Should we feed them instead of hanging them?

== President of Turkey ==
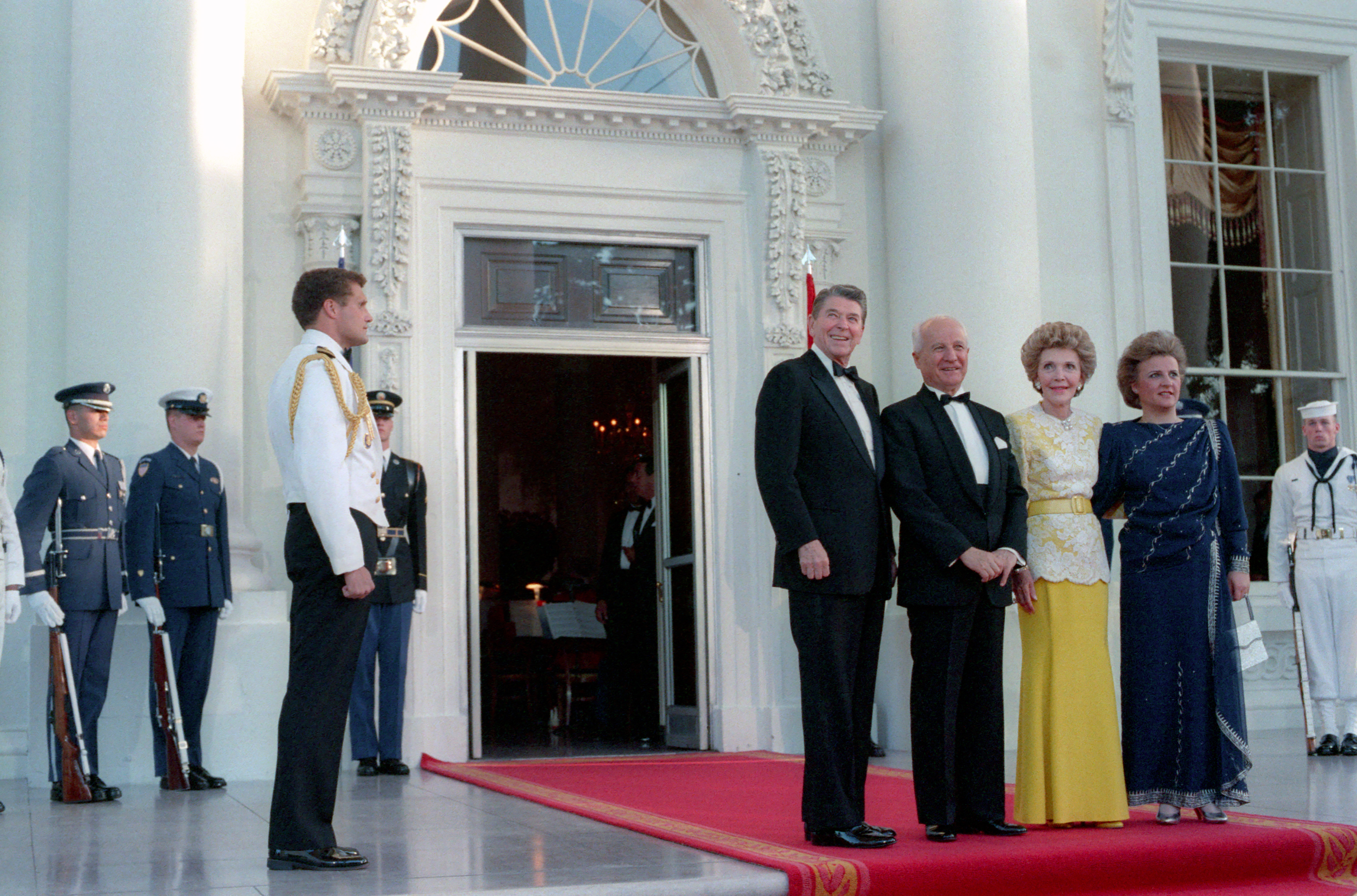
Kenan Evren and his daughter Şenay Evren with President Ronald Reagan and Nancy Reagan, June 1988

After the coup, Kenan Evren was elected as President of Turkey on 7 November 1982 with the 91.37% approval of the new constitution that was submitted to a controversial referendum, replacing the older constitution which, according to him, had liberties too "luxurious" for Turkey.

Kenan Evren, after leading the 1980 military coup in Turkey, used a combination of brutal repression, ideological indoctrination, and legal restructuring to instill obedience in the population. He oversaw mass arrests of over 600,000 people, widespread torture, and dozens of executions, and mass firings, which created a climate of fear. Political parties, unions, and dissenting voices were silenced, while media and education were tightly controlled to promote the military's nationalist and conservative ideology, particularly the "Turkish-Islamic Synthesis" which blended Sunni Islam with Turkish nationalism to foster obedience. A new 1982 constitution centralized power in the presidency (which Evren assumed), gave the military a lasting role in governance, and enforced loyalty to the state as a legal and educational principle. Through this system of fear, ideological control, and institutional redesign, Evren aimed to create a disciplined and obedient citizenry loyal to the military-led order.

In Summary, Evren suspended many forms of civil liberties and human rights on the grounds that it was necessary to establish stability. He professed great admiration for the founder of the Republic of Turkey, Mustafa Kemal Atatürk.

Kenan Evren despite being a staunch defender of Kemalism used a religious rhetoric in his speeches to make his remarks more relatable.

Evren took strong measures to ensure that the division between the political left and right would not turn into violence again; the new constitution limited the rights and depoliticized the youth.

Kenan Evren's junta regime stressed the importance of family planning and passed more liberal laws on abortion.

According to a report on the Susurluk scandal of 1996, prepared by Prime Ministry Inspection Board Deputy Chairman Kutlu Savaş, quoted by the Human Rights Foundation of Turkey, "Fascists had been released from prison in return for 'finishing some jobs' under Evren's rule after 12 September 1980".

Concerning Kurds, he denied their existence and claimed the word Kurd comes from the noise that is heard when walking in the snow. Referring to Kurds he used the term Mountain Turk.

Evren was also the last Turkish president to have been born in the Ottoman Empire.

== Post-presidency ==
After his retirement, he moved to the Turkish Mediterranean resort town of Armutalan, Marmaris, and took up painting.

On 2 August 2006, a reported plan for assassinating Evren was thwarted when two men were apprehended and arrested in Muğla.

A previous attempt in 1996 had already been tracked down when two members of the assassination team spoke on a cellphone eavesdropped by the police, and the Islamic call to prayer (adhan) could be heard during their conversation. Since the timing of the adhan was 4–5 minutes after Istanbul, a point slightly more to the west by that time margin was sought and the team members were caught in Marmaris itself.

In 2004, he revealed that his daughter, Şenay Gürvit, and son-in-law, Erkan Gürvit, are members of the National Intelligence Organization. His daughter presided over the reprisal operations against the militant Armenian organization ASALA.

After Bülent Ecevit's death, he expressed remorse over the arrest of political leaders after the 1980 coup, but defended the coup itself and the 35 executions.

Civilian resentment exists, and there were demands for his being called to account following the Ergenekon investigation.

== Trial and conviction ==
On 10 January 2012, Turkish courts decided to press charges against General Kenan Evren and General Tahsin Şahinkaya, former Commander of the Turkish Air Force, for their role in the 1980 coup. Prosecutors sought life sentences against them. The first court hearing of the case was scheduled for 4 April 2012. Both were sentenced to life imprisonment on 18 June 2014 by a court in Ankara. In accordance with Article 30 of the Military Penal Code, Evren and Şahinkaya were demoted to the lowest rank of private; as the decision was appealed and Evren died before the final decision of the court of appeals, the demotion was not final. On his gravestone he is commemorated as the seventh President of Turkey.

== Personal life ==
Evren married Sekine Evren in 1944. They had a child that died in infancy and three daughters, Şenay, Gülay and Miray. Sekine died in 1982. In 1990, he was awarded the Atatürk International Peace Prize. He was also fluent in English.

== Illness and death ==
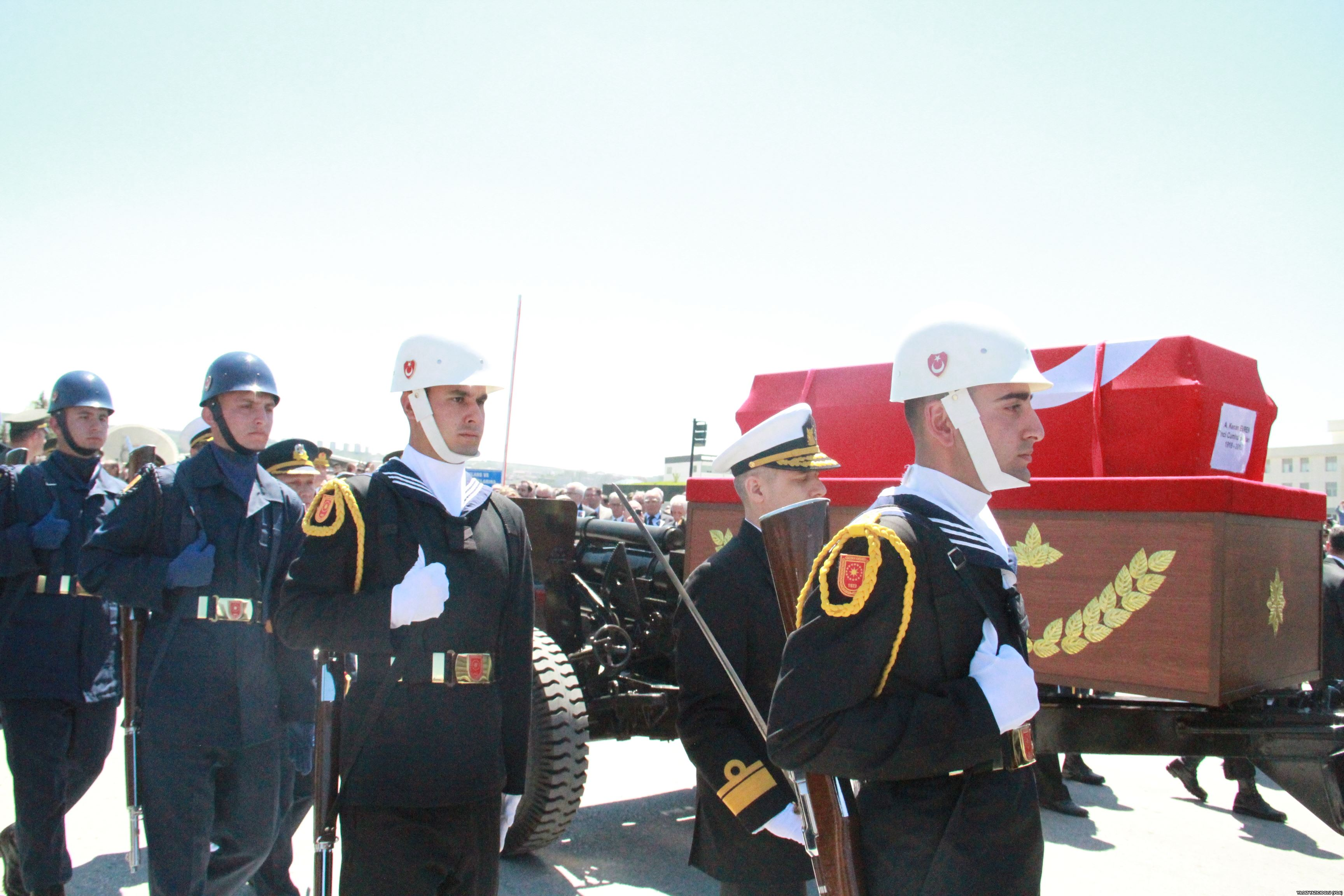
Funeral of Kenan Evren held on 12 May 2015

Evren was hospitalized for massive gastrointestinal bleeding on 3 August 2009, in Yalıkavak, Bodrum, where his summer house is located. A temporary artificial pacemaker was applied to Evren while in intensive care due to bradycardia. His large intestine was removed a week later at the Gülhane Military Medical Academy (GATA) in Haydarpaşa, Istanbul where he was transferred. He was discharged on 24 September 2009.

Evren died at a military hospital in Ankara on 9 May 2015, aged 97. On 12 May, he was buried in the Turkish State Cemetery in Ankara following the funeral service held at Ahmet Hamdi Akseki Mosque. The funeral was attended by his close relatives and military personnel. In protest, political parties sent no representatives to the former president's funeral. A number of people protested during the religious service in the mosque's courtyard.

== Notes ==
Military offices
Preceded by Semih Sancar	Commander of the Turkish Army; 5 September 1977 – 6 March 1978	Succeeded by Nurettin Ersin
Preceded by Semih Sancar	Chief of the General Staff of Turkey; 7 March 1978 – 1 July 1983	Succeeded by Nurettin Ersin
Political offices
Preceded by Fahri Korutürk	President of Turkey; 12 September 1980 – 9 November 1989	Succeeded by Turgut Özal
