= Özal =

Özal is a Turkish surname. Notable people with the surname include:

- Ahmet Özal (born 1955), Turkish politician
- Korkut Özal (1929–2016), Turkish engineer and politician
- Mehmet Özal (born 1978), Turkish wrestler in Greco-Roman style
- Turgut Özal (1927–1993), Turkish politician and 8th President of Turkey
- Semra Özal (born 1934), wife of Turgut Özal

== See also ==
- Özal family
- Özalp
