= Turgut Özal (disambiguation) =

Turgut Özal (1927–1993) was a Turkish politician who served as the 8th President of Turkey from 1989 to 1993. He previously served as the 26th Prime Minister of Turkey from 1983 to 1989 as the leader of the Motherland Party.

Turgut Özal may also refer to:

- Turgut Özal (Istanbul Metro), Turkey
- Malatya Turgut Özal University, Malatya, Turkey
- Turgut Özal University, Ankara, Turkey
- Turgut Özal Medical Center at İnönü University, Turkey

== See also ==
- Özal family
- Özal, disambiguation
