= Yalçın =

Yalçın or Yalchin is a given name and a surname of Turkic origin that means “steep, rocky”. Notable people with the name include:

== Given name ==
- Yalchin Adigezalov (born 1959), Azerbaijani conductor and teacher
- Yalçın Akdoğan (born 1969), Turkish politician
- Yalçın Ayaslı (born 1946), Turkish-American business executive
- Yalçın Ayhan (born 1982), Turkish football player
- Yalçın Çaka (born 1931), Turkish football player
- Yalçın Didman (born 1947), Turkish comic book creator
- Yalçın Granit (1932–2020), Turkish basketball player, coach and sports journalist
- Yalçın Hafızoğlu (born 1989), Turkish actor
- Yalçın Karapınar (born 1967), Turkish wrestler
- Yalçın Kayan (born 1999), Turkish footballer
- Yalçın Koşukavak (born 1972), Turkish football manager
- Yalçın Küçük (1938–2026), Turkish socialist writer, philosopher, economist and historian
- Yalchin Rzazadeh (born 1969), Azerbaijani pop singer
- Yalçın Topçu (born 1957), Turkish politician
- Yalçın Tura (born 1934), Turkish composer, music theorist, musicologist, and academic
- Yalçın Ünsal (born 1933), Turkish athlete
- Yiğit Yalçın Çıtak (born 2001), Turkish Olympian sailor

== Surname ==
- Lev Yalcin (born 1985), Turkish football player
- Nihal Yalçın (born 1981), Turkish actress
- Pınar Yalçın (born 1988), Turkish-Swedish football player
- Robin Yalçın (born 1994), German football player of Turkish descent
- Saygin Yalcin (born 1985), German businessman based in Dubai of Turkish descent
- Sergen Yalçın (born 1972), Turkish football player and coach
- Serkan Yalçın (born 1982), Turkish football player
- Soner Yalçın (born 1966), Turkish journalist and writer
- Süleyman Yalçın (1926–2016), Turkish physician and conservative thinker
- Taner Yalçın (born 1990), Turkish-German football player
- Yeter Yalçın (born 1988), Turkish female volleyball player

== See also ==
- Yalçıntaş, list of people with a similar surname
