= Community of İskenderpaşa =

Turkish Islamic order

İskenderpaşa Jamia or the Iskenderpasha Community (Turkish: İskenderpaşa Cemaati) is a branch of Naqshbandiyya-Khalidiyya Ṭarīqah (Sufi Order) in Turkey.

== History ==
The Jamia of Iskenderpaşa was first established by Mehmed Zahid Kotku (1897–1980) when he was appointed as the imam of Iskender Pasha Mosque in Fatih district of Istanbul, which was constructed by the Grand Vizier Skender Pasha of Ottoman Sultan Bayezid II (reigned 1481–1512). The leader of the jamia after Kotku's death was Mahmud Esad Coşan. Then, Coşan's son Muharrem Nureddin Coşan as the successor became the leader.

== Notable members ==
This community has many prominent members, including current Turkish president Recep Tayyip Erdoğan.

=== Former Prime Ministers of Turkey ===
Necmettin Erbakan, Turgut Özal, Yıldırım Akbulut, and Recep Tayyip Erdoğan.

=== Other politicians ===
Numan Kurtulmuş, Celal Adan, Korkut Özal, Hasan Celal Güzel, Fahrettin Koca, Yusuf Bozkurt Özal, Recai Kutan, Ahmet Özal, Nevzat Yalçıntaş and Muhsin Yazıcıoğlu.
