= İskender Pasha Mosque, Fatih =

Mosque in Fatih, Istanbul, Turkey

İskender Pasha Mosque (Terkim Masjid)
- İskender Paşa Cami) (Terkim Mescidi)
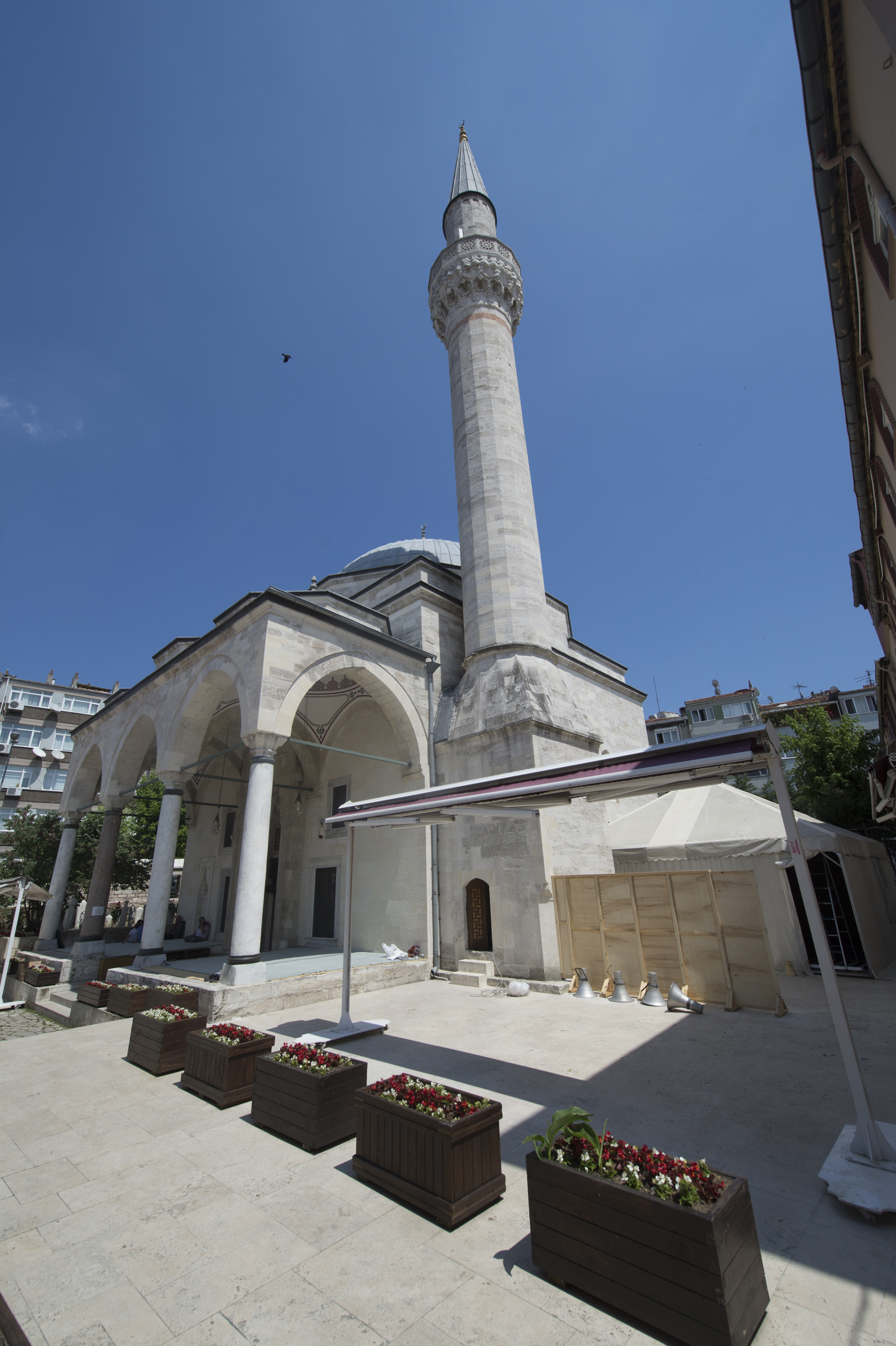

- Location in the Fatih district of Istanbul

Religion
- Affiliation: Sunni Islam

Location
- Location: Akşemsettin Mah. Sarıgüzel Cad.no 36, Fatih, Istanbul
- Country: Turkey
- Interactive map of İskender Pasha Mosque (Terkim Masjid)
- Coordinates: 41.01667°N 28.94788°E

Architecture
- Type: Mosque
- Style: Classical Ottoman
- General contractor: İskender Pasha
- Completed: 15th or 16th-century

Specifications
- Length: 10.90 m (35.8 ft)
- Width: 10.90 + 4.25 m (35.8 + 13.9 ft)
- Dome: 1 main + 3 side domes
- Minaret: 1
- Materials: Ashlar

İskender Pasha Mosque (Turkish: İskender Paşa Cami), a.k.a. Terkim Masjid (Turkish: Terkim Mescidi) is a historic mosque located in Fatih district in Istanbul, Turkey.

Located on Sarıgüzel Street in İskenderpaşa neighborhood of Fatih, it was endowed in 1505–06 by İskender Pasha, who lived at the time of Mehmed the Conqueror (1432–1481) and served as a vizier of Bayezid II (reigned 1481–1512). A native of Çakallı village of Vize, İskender Pasha died in 1507, so it is assumed that the mosque was built at the end of the 15th century or in the beginning of the 16th century. The mosque takes its other name "Terkim Masjid" from the Janissary barracks situated in the vicinity in the past.

The mosque was repaired and restored in the years 1756, 1887, 1945 and 1956. In 1989, a two-story annex of 360 m^{2} (3,900 sq ft) was added to enlarge the prayer room. The 1999 İzmit earthquake, caused the spire of the minaret fell onto the main dome and caused considerable damage. The mosque underwent major repair and restoration works in 2006.

== Architecture ==
The mosque courtyard is entered through by two gates to the north and south. Around the courtyard, there are course rooms. In the center of it, a newly built marble shadirvan is situated.

The 4.25 m (13.9 ft)-deep portico has three pointed arched openings and four columns carrying three domes. It was once a closed space walled with glass windows. The column capitals were taken from a Byzanyine work. However, they lost their originality due to chipping during repair works. On the left side of the portico, a mihrab is situated. The entrance of the mosque is enclosed in a rectangular frame and decorated with a marble muqarnas on its top.

Covered by a single dome, the mosque has a square plan with dimension of 10.90 m × 10.90 m (35.8 ft × 35.8 ft). The walls are built with ashlar. The dome sits on a dodecagonal squinch and has one window at each of the four sides.

There are two rows of windows, one upon the other, on both sides of the mosque. The two lower windows on each side are rectangular. The three upper windows on each side are slightly arched. The windows on the portico wall are aligned only at the lower row. All the windows are enclosed in hand-carved decorations colored with white on blue.

The mihrab is made of soft limestone. It is decorated with a muqarnas. The minbar was renewed in wood. The pulpit is made of marble. The wooden upper mahfil stretches along the wall on the entrance side supported by six twin wooden masts. The original marble staircase leading from the portico up to the upper mahfil was canceled. Currently, it is reached by a newly constructed wooden staircase inside the harem on the right side of the entrance. In the center of the dome ceiling, Quran ayah inscriptions are painted, which are enclosed in hand-carved ornaments.

The minaret is adjacent to the right side of the portico wall. It is entered through a door inside the portico. Built in ashlar, it sits on a square-plan base and has a polygonal-formed shaft. It has one balcony with muqarnas underpart. Under the balcony, a red-colored stone belt winds round. The minaret's spire has been restored.

== Center of Naqshbandi Order ==
Mehmet Zahit Kotku (1897–1980), notable Sheikh of a Naqshbandi tariqa, a major Sunni Islam spiritual order of Sufism, served as the mosque's imam. During his time, he made the mosque and its environment an attractive place for the followers of the order, who were popularly called the "Community of İskenderpaşa" (Turkish: İskenderpaşa Cemaati).

Among Kotku's followers were many prominent Islamist politicians including Recai Kutan (born 1930), Necmettin Erbakan (1926–2011), Turgut Özal (1927–1993), Süleyman Demirel (1924–2015) and Recep Tayyip Erdoğan (born 1954), who later became political party leaders and served as prime minister and president. Kotku supported Erbakan in 1969 as he co-founded the National Order Party (Turkish: Milli Nizam Partisi, MNP). Under Kotku's leadership, the Naqshbandi order had an important role in Turkish political life. The MNP was banned after the 1971 Turkish military memorandum on the grounds that it violated the articles of the Constitution of Turkey dealing with secularism. The order's followers founded the successor National Salvation Party (Turkish: Millî Selâmet Partisi, MSP) in 1972, which entered parliament in 1974, but was closed down after the 1980 Turkish coup d'état.

Even though the central structure of the order decayed, and it began to lose its power in politics right after the death of Kotku in 1980, the mosque still keeps its position as the center of the Naqshbandi Order.

It was reported that the upper middle class religious people favor close vicinity of mosques matching their denomination in order to be able to steadily attend prayers and to be a part of the order's community. They invest in such places, and for this reason the rental and sale prices of homes in the neighborhood of İskender Pasha Mosque are extraordinarily high.

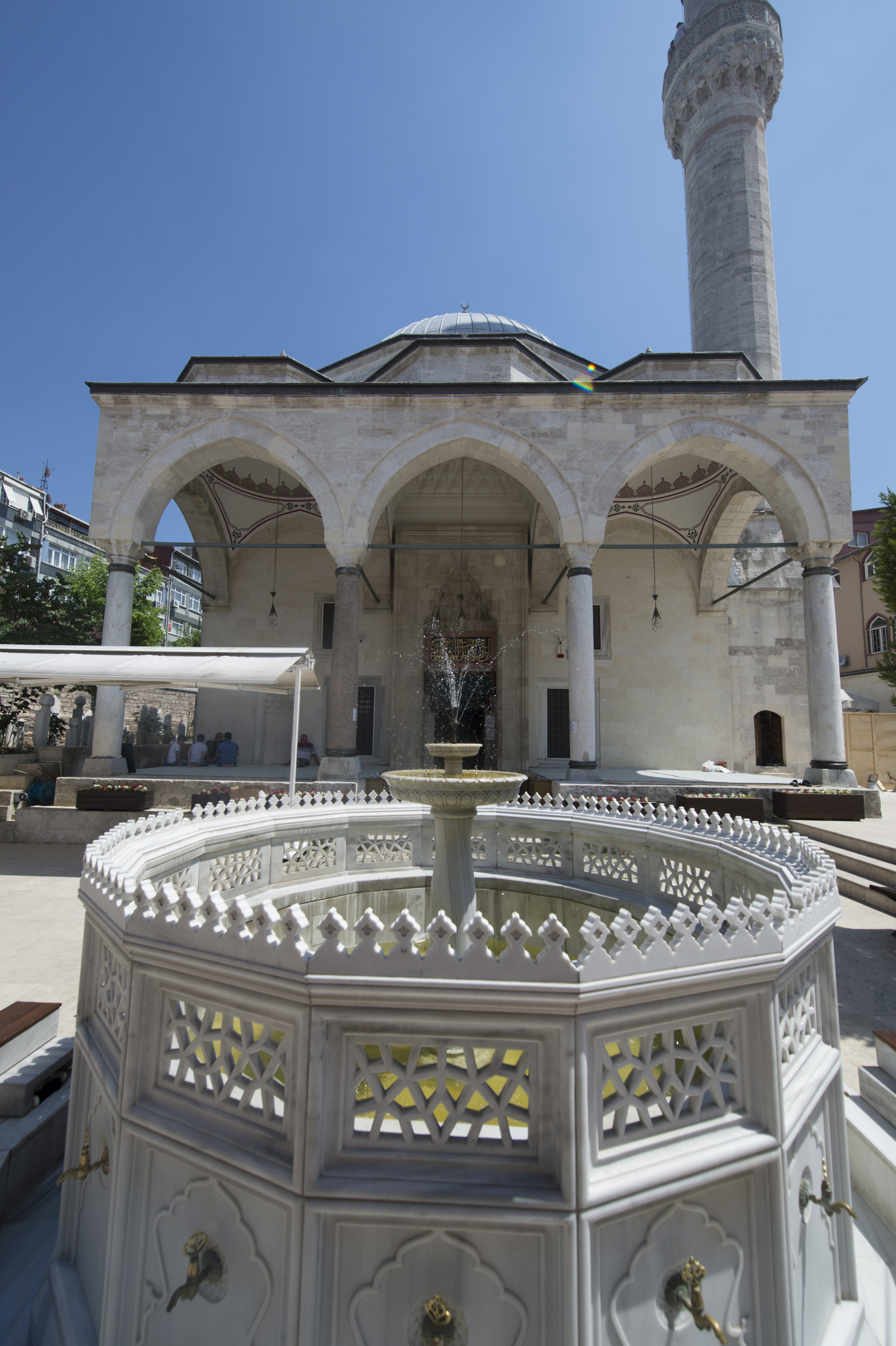
Iskender Pasha Mosque view over şadırvan

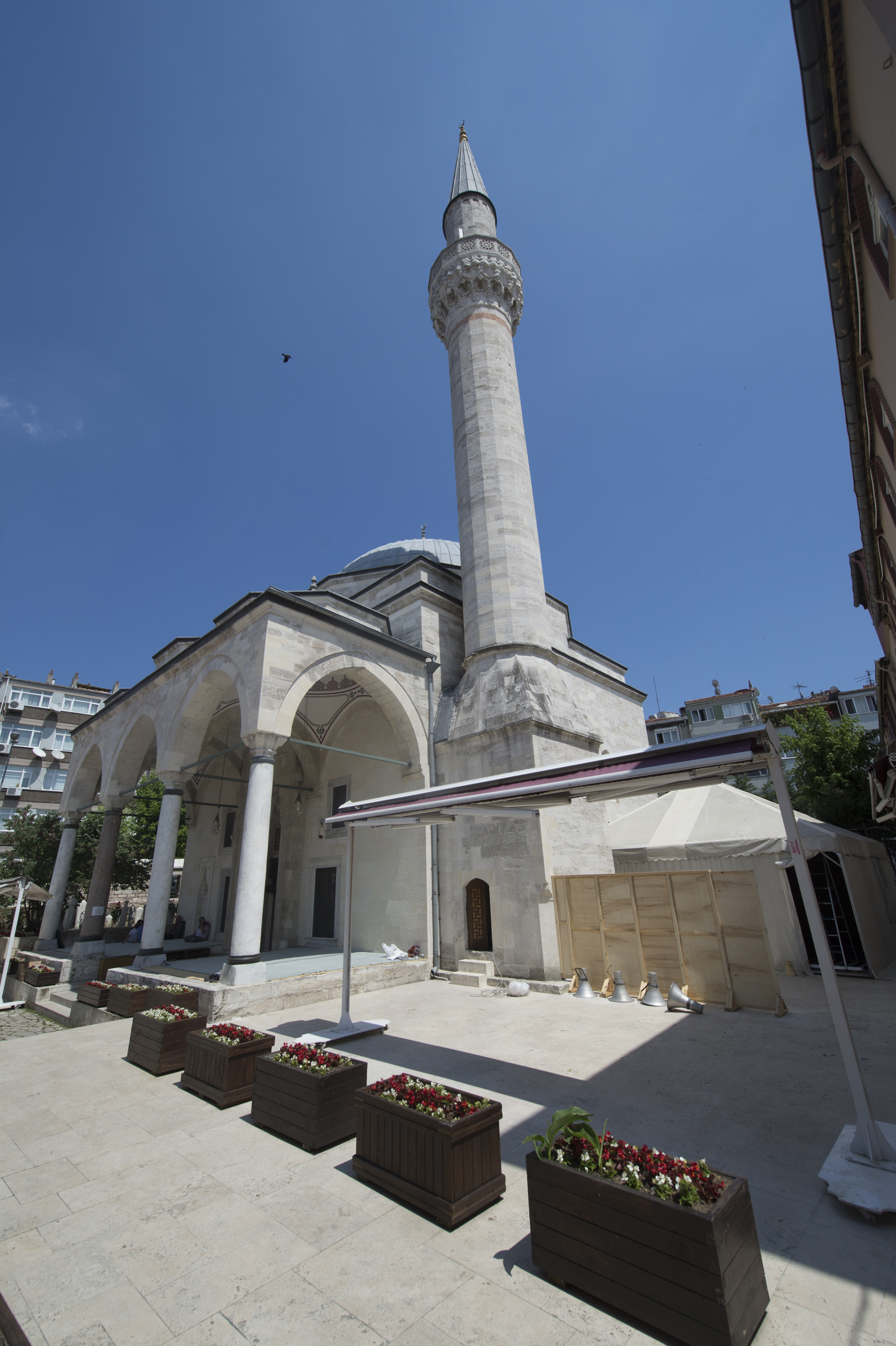
Iskender Pasha Mosque from side

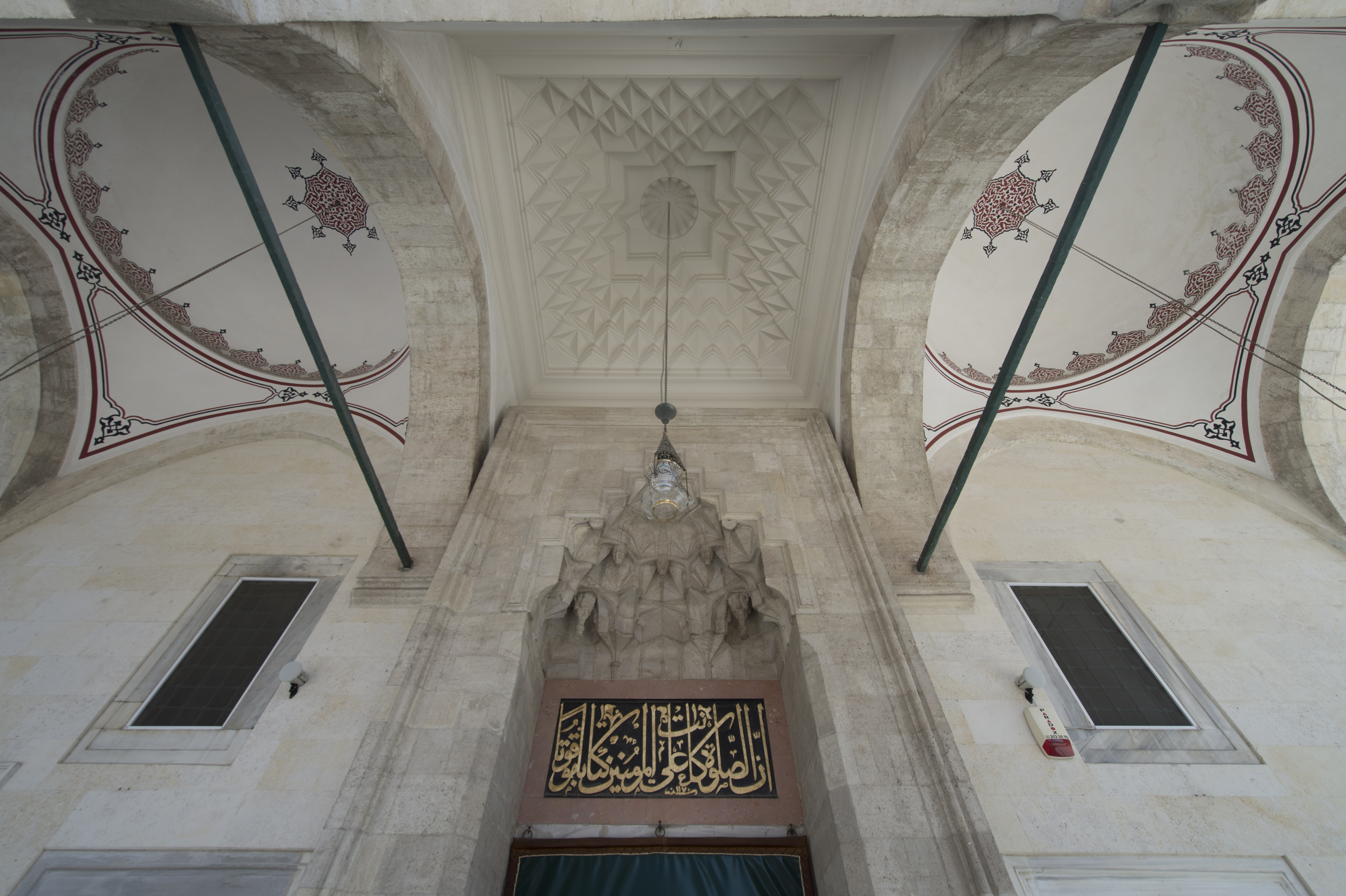
Iskender Pasha Mosque entrance

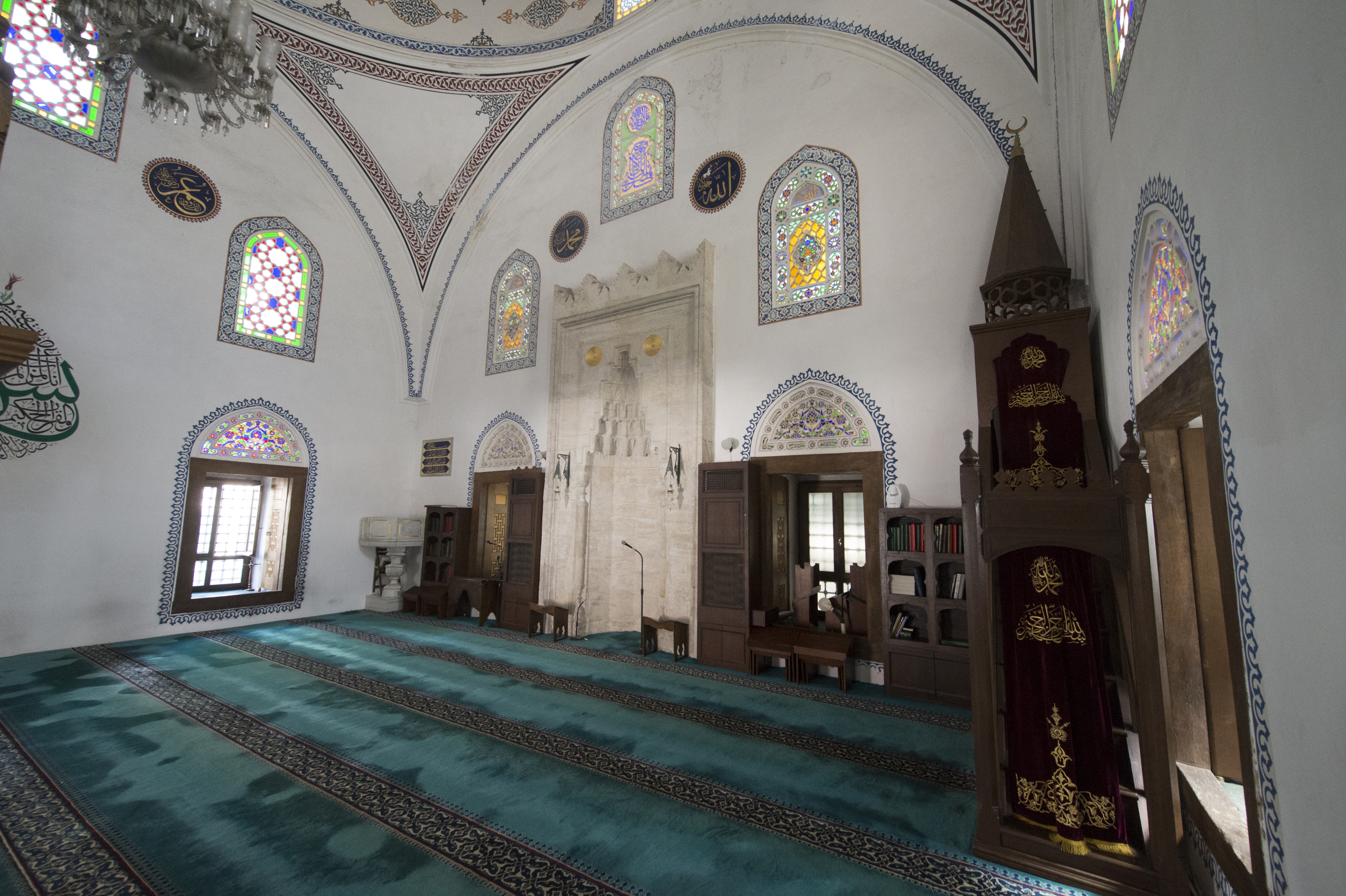
Iskender Pasha Mosque interior

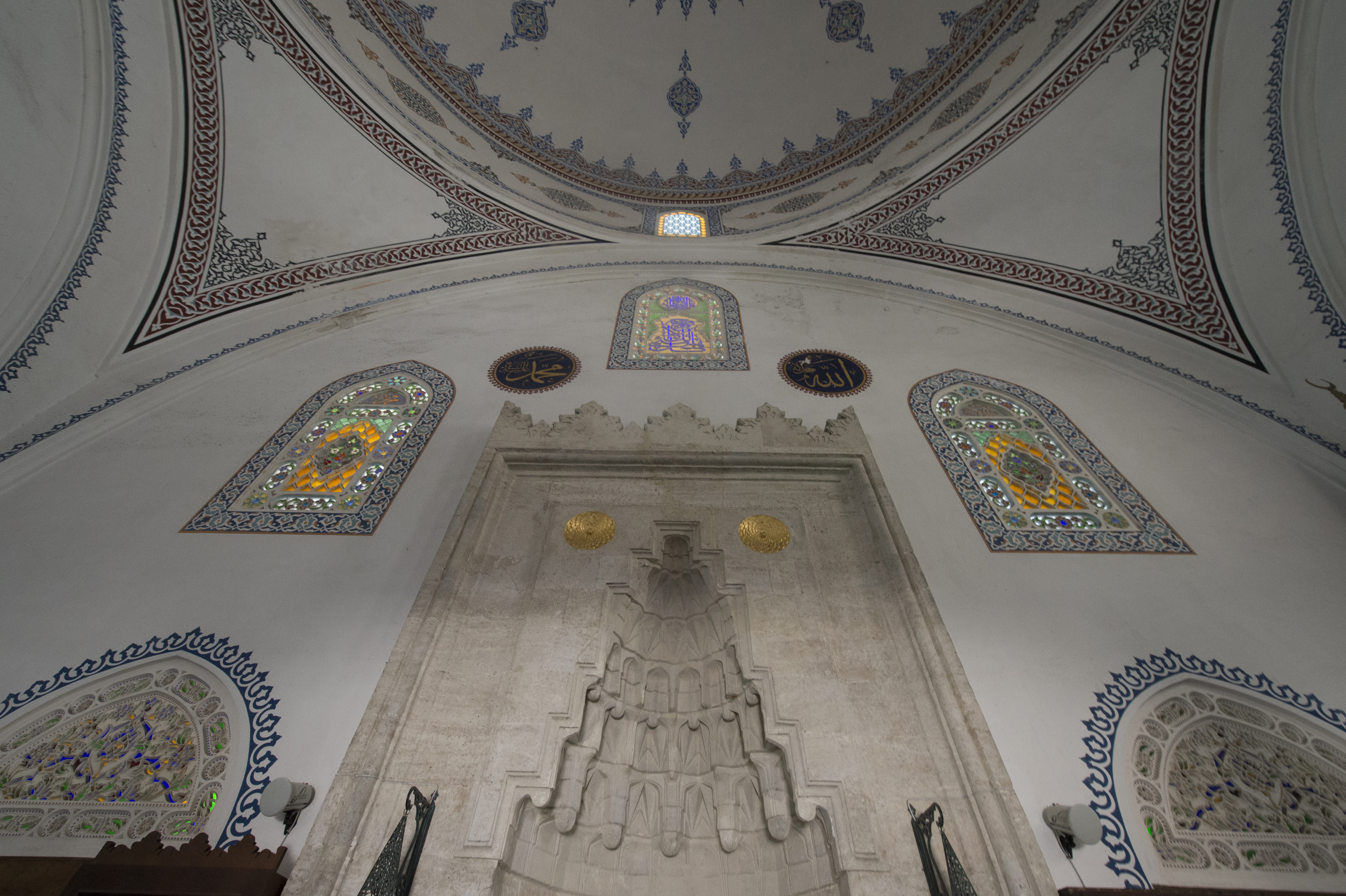
Iskender Pasha Mosque interior at mihrab
