= Yalçıntaş =

Yalçıntaş is a Turkish name which is a compound word: Yalçın+taş. In Turkish yalçın means steep, smooth, slippery, shiny, polished and taş means stone.

Notable people with the surname include:

== People ==
- İlyas Yalçıntaş (born 1989), Turkish musical artist
- Murat Yalçıntaş, Turkish businessman
- Nevzat Yalçıntaş (1933–2016), Turkish academic and politician
