= Mahmud Esad Coşan =

Turkish academic and writer (1938–2001)

Prof. Dr. Mahmud Esad Coşan
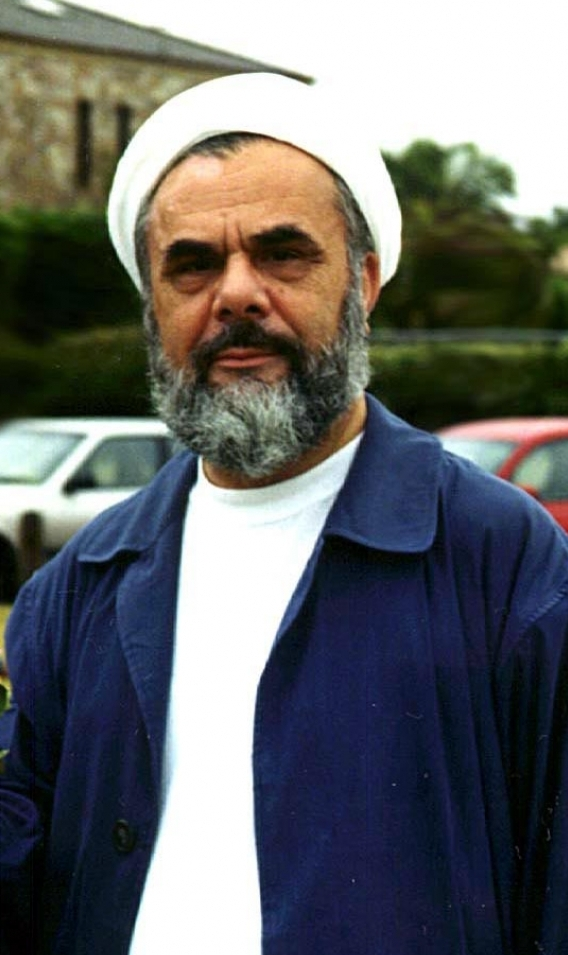
- Coşan in Australia, 1999

Personal life
- Born: 14 April 1938 Ahmetçe, Ayvacık, Çanakkale, Turkey
- Died: 4 February 2001 (aged 62) Dubbo, Orana, New South Wales, Australia
- Cause of death: Car crash
- Resting place: Eyüp Cemetery, Eyüp, Istanbul; 41°03′10″N 28°56′04″E
- Parents: Halil Necati Coşan (father); Şadiye Coşan (mother)
- Main interest(s): Fiqh, Tafsir, Hadith
- Notable works: Hadji Baktash Veli and his Work Maqalat (1982); Hatiboğlu Muhammed and His Works (2008); Historical and Mystical Figures (2008); The Conquest of Istanbul and Conqueror (2009); Our Language and Culture (2009); The Printer Ibrahim-i Muteferriqa and Risale-i Islamiyye (2010)
- Education: Vefa High School; Istanbul University; Ankara University

Religious life
- Religion: Islam
- Denomination: Sunni
- Jurisprudence: Hanafi
- Tariqa: Naqshbandi
- Creed: Maturidi
- Movement: İskenderpaşa

Muslim leader
- Influenced by: Abu al-Hassan al-Kharaqani, Baha' al-Din Naqshband, Ahmad Sirhindi, Abu Hanifa, Abu Mansur al-Maturidi, Mirza Mazhar Jan-e-Janaan
- Influenced: Community of İskenderpaşa

Military service
- Website: mec.org.tr

Mahmud Esad Coşan (14 April 1938 – 4 February 2001) was a Turkish academic author, preacher, professor of Islam and Naqshbandi leader.

== Early life ==
He was born in Çanakkale's Ayvacık county, Ahmetçe village. He finished Vezneciler Primary School in 1950 and Vefa High School in 1956. He started Istanbul University, Faculty of Letters, the Arab-Persian Philology. He took certificates of Arabic Language and Literature, Persian Language and Literature, Medieval History and Turkish-Islamic Art. Classic-Religious Turkish Texts Chair won first place in the residency exam in Ankara, in 1960. He served as secretary for two years in first years of assistance in faculty editorial board. In 1965, he received his PhD by completing a dissertation on the fifteenth century poet Hatiboğlu Muhammed and his works. In 1973, he became Associate Professor and became a faculty member in University of Ankara Turkish-Islamic Literature Department. In 1977–1980, while teaching at the College of Theology, he also taught Turkish Language and Literature at the Sakarya Government Architecture and Engineering Academy. In 1982, he became full Professor and he served as guest lecturer abroad.

== Community of İskenderpaşa ==
In 1977, he began to chats of hadith with Mehmed Zahid Kotku's order. He was the leader of İskenderpaşa Jamia of the Nakşibendi-Khalidiyya Ṭarīqah when Mehmed Zahid Kotku died on 13 November 1980. He voluntarily retired in 1987. He continued his conferencing, chat, publishing, and various corporate activities. He went to Australia after the 28 February operation. From 1997 until his death, he lived in Australia and attended conferences in Australia, the United States, and Europe.

== Death ==
Coşan and his son-in-law Ali Yücel Uyarel died in a car accident on the night of 4 February 2001 in Dubbo, Australia.

Congregation members went to the community centre in Bulgurlu, Üsküdar following the arrival of the news of Coşan's death. Coşan's father Halil Necati Coşan and his brother Ahmet Mithat Coşan agreed condolences in Çilhane Mosque.

On 9 February 2001 his funeral prayer was held in Fatih Mosque. He was buried in Eyup Sultan Cemetery.

== Works ==
=== Published By Server İletişim ===
- İslâm Dergisi Başmakaleleri (Editorials of Magazine of Islam)
- Kadın ve Aile Dergisi Başmakaleleri (Editorials of Magazine of Women and Family)
- İlim Sanat ve Panzehir Dergileri Başmakaleleri (Editorials of Magazines of Science&Art and Antidote)
- İdeal Yol (Ideal Way)
- Dilimiz ve Kültürümüz (Our Language and Culture)
- Tarihi ve Tasavvufi Şahsiyetler (Historical and Mystical Figures)
- Mehmed Zahid Kotku (Mehmed Zahid Kotku)
- İstanbul'un Fethi ve Fatih (The Conquest of Istanbul and Conqueror)
- Hatiboğlu Muhammed ve Eserleri (Hatiboğlu Muhammed and His Works)

=== Published By Seha Neşriyat ===
- Matbaaci Ibrâhîm-i Müteferrika ve Risâle-i Islâmiye (1982) (The Printer Ibrahim-i Muteferriqa and Risale-i Islamiyye)
- Haji Bektashi Veli ve Maqàlat (Hadji Baktash Veli and his Work Maqalat)
- Gayemiz (1987) (Our Aim)
- İslâm Çağrısı (1990) (The Message of Islam)
- Yeni Ufuklar (1992) (New Horizons)
- Çocuklarla Basbasa (Amongst Children)
- Basarinin Prensipleri (The principles of success)
- Türk Dili ve Kültürü (Turkish Language and Culture)
- Islâm'da Nefis Terbiyesi ve Tasavvufa Giriş (1992) (The Purification of Self in Islam and introduction to Sufism)
- Avustralya Sohbetleri-1 (1992) (Australia Discourses 1)
- Avustralya Sohbetleri-2 (1994) (Australia Discourses 2)
- Avustralya Sohbetleri-3 (1995) (Australia Discourses 3)
- Avustralya Sohbetleri-4 (1996) (Australia Discourses 4)
- Yeni Dönemde Yeni Görevler (1993) (New Duties in the New Era)
- Haccın Fazîletleri ve İncelikleri (1994) (The Virtues and Subtleties of Hajj)
- Zaferin Yolu ve Şartları (1994) (The Path and Fundamentals of Victory)
- Islâm, Sevgi ve Tasavvuf (1994) (Islam, Love and Tasawwuf )
- Sosyal Çalışmalarda Organizasyon ve Başarı (1994) (Organisation and Success in Social Activities)
- Güncel Meseleler-1 (1994) (Current Issues 1)
- Güncel Meseleler-2 (1995) (Current Issues 2)
- Hazret-i Ali Efendimiz'den Vecîzeler (1995) (The Jewels of Wisdom from our Master Hadrat Ali)
- Haci Bektâsh-i Velî (1995) (Hadji Baktash-i Walî)
- Yunus Emre ve Tasavvuf (1995) (Yunus Emre and Sufism)
- Başarı Yolunda Sevginin Gücü (1995) (The Power of Love in the Path of Success)
- Islâmî Çalışma ve Hizmetlerde Metod (1995) (Methodology in Islamic Activities)
- Sosyal Hizmetlerde Hanimlar (1995) (Women in Social Activities)
- Ramazan ve Takvâ Eğitimi (1996) (Ramadan and Acquisition of Piety)
- Teblig ve Irşad Çalişmalari (1996) (Dawah Activities)
- Islâm, Tasavvuf ve Hayat (1996) (Islam, Tasawwuf and Life)
- Haydi Hizmete!.. (1997) (Come to Serving Society)
- Islâm'da Eğitimin İncelikleri (1997) (Subtleties of Education in Islam)
- Tasavvuf Yolu Nedir? (1997) (What is Tasawwuf?)
- Imanin ve Islâm'in Korunmasi-1 (1997) (The Protection of Faith and Islam 1)
- Imanin ve Islâm'in Korunmasi-2 (1998) (The Protection of Faith and Islam 2)
- Allah'ın Gazabi ve Riızasi (1997) (The Wrath and Pleasure of Allah)
- Mi'rac Gecesi (1998) (The Night of Ascension)
- Dogru Inanç ve Güzel Kulluk (1998) (True Faith and Good Servitude)
- Ramazan ve Güzel Ameller (1998) (Ramadhan and Good Deeds)
