= Özalism =

Economic & social views and political style of Turgut Özal in Turkey

Özalism (Turkish: Özalcılık) refers to the economic and social views and political style of Turgut Özal, who was the Prime Minister of Turkey between 1983 and 1989 and the President of Turkey between 1989 and 1993. Özalism can also be used to cover the periods of Yıldırım Akbulut and Mesut Yılmaz, who were prime ministers after Özal and partially continued his economic views.

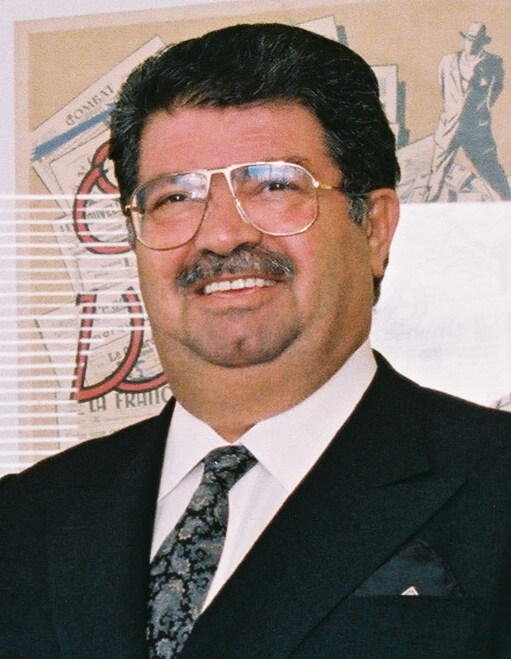
Turgut Özal

== Formation ==
This process, in which the New Right policies directly affected the understanding of public service with Thatcherism in the UK and Reaganism in the US, also found a response in Turkey. In the first general elections held in the country after the military coup of 12 September 1980, the newly established Motherland Party under the leadership of Turgut Özal came to power by a wide margin and remained in office without sharing the power with anyone until 1991. Supported by both Istanbul and Ankara, Özal, the leader of the movement, made important changes and started a new process called Özalism with the new right-wing policies he implemented in Turkey.

The 1980s, when Özal was also in power, was a period when the New Right understanding began to dominate all over the world, and Özal, being affected by this process, became the political subject of this new era. Margaret Thatcher's statement "I am a defender of Özal's policies until the end" is considered as an important statement in terms of showing that Özal's liberal conservative understanding of politics is appreciated in the outside world as well as emphasizing his charismatic and pragmatist identity.

Özal, who was affected by the New Right understanding; It has taken the risk of being the clear target of the status quo in the context of voicing demands on the downsizing and operationalization of the public, governance, and economic liberalization. In this framework, Özal and his party ANAP became the architects of the synthesis of neo-liberalism and neo-conservatism in Turkish political life, in the form of Özalism. Özalism refers to the implementation of the New Right policies in Turkey that combines neoliberal and neoconservative elements. It is the first expression in Turkey of the views describing the policies and practices known as Reaganism and Thatcherism. With this understanding, Özal argued that in line with liberalization policies, the state should be a guide rather than a regulatory actor in the economy, and the individual should be an entrepreneur instead of the state. He tried to put these ideas into practice with the privatization policies he implemented in the fields of health, education, social services and social insurance.

=== Economy ===
The structural change program based on the free market order in the economy was put into practice during the Turgut Özal government. The per capita income in Turkey, which includes the Prime Ministry period between 1983 and 1987, rose from 1,539 dollars in 1980 to 1,636 dollars in 1987. It succeeded in transforming Turkey from an import substitution model to an export-led growth model and the Turkish economy was opened to competition. Organized industrial zones were established in many Anatolian provinces and districts in the period, and Anatolia made production and turned to export directly.

=== Turkish nationalism and Islam ===
During his tenure he continued the Kemalist tradition of secularism and nationalism, although he was much more tolerant towards Islam than hardline Kemalists.
