= Kartal Demirağ =

Kartal Demirağ is a Turkish assassin who tried to assassinate then Turkish Prime Minister Turgut Özal on June 18, 1988. Özal was wounded by one bullet but suffered no serious injuries.

Demirağ was captured and sentenced to life imprisonment. After Özal became President of Turkey, Demirağ was released on parole after serving 4 years. In late 2008, after Demirağ had broken his parole, he was retried before Ankara's 1st High Criminal Court and reconvicted of the attempted murder. He was sentenced to 20 years in prison.
