= Nazmiye Demirel =

First lady of Turkey from 1993 to 2000

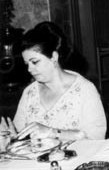

First Lady of Turkey
- In role 16 May 1993 – 16 May 2000
- President: Süleyman Demirel
- Preceded by: Semra Özal
- Succeeded by: Semra Sezer

Spouse of the Prime Minister of Turkey
- In role 20 November 1991 – 16 May 1993
- Prime Minister: Süleyman Demirel
- Preceded by: Berna Yılmaz
- Succeeded by: Sevinç İnönü (acting)
- In role 12 November 1979 – 12 September 1980
- Prime Minister: Süleyman Demirel
- Preceded by: Rahşan Ecevit
- In role 21 July 1977 – 5 January 1978
- Prime Minister: Süleyman Demirel
- Preceded by: Rahşan Ecevit
- Succeeded by: Rahşan Ecevit
- In role 31 March 1975 – 21 June 1977
- Prime Minister: Süleyman Demirel
- Preceded by: Ayşe Seniha Irmak
- Succeeded by: Rahşan Ecevit
- In role 21 October 1965 – 16 March 1971
- Prime Minister: Süleyman Demirel
- Preceded by: Zeynep Nigar Ürgüplü
- Succeeded by: Kamile Okutman

Personal details
- Born: Nazmiye Şener; 3 January 1927 Isparta, Turkey
- Died: 27 May 2013 (aged 86) Ankara, Turkey
- Resting place: Süleyman Demirel Memorial Tomb, Atabey
- Spouse: Süleyman Demirel (m. 1948)

Nazmiye Demirel (3 January 1927 – 27 May 2013) was the 9th First Lady of Turkey. She was the wife of Süleyman Demirel, the 9th President of Turkey, until her death.

She was born on 3 January 1927 in Isparta. On 12 March 1948 she married Süleyman Demirel; she became the 9th first lady of Turkey in 1993 when her husband became president. She suffered from Alzheimer's disease since 2005. She died on 27 May 2013 at a hospital in Ankara.
