= Semra Sezer =

First Lady of Turkey from 2000 to 2007

- Sezer in 2004

First Lady of Turkey
- In role May 16, 2000 – August 28, 2007
- President: Ahmet Necdet Sezer
- Preceded by: Nazmiye Demirel
- Succeeded by: Hayrünnisa Gül

Personal details
- Born: Semra Kürümoğlu; August 16, 1944 (age 82) Yenimahalle, Ankara, Turkey
- Spouse: Ahmet Necdet Sezer (m. 1964)
- Children: 3
- Education: Ankara University, Law School; Atatürk Teachers' School; Hacettepe University
- Profession: School teacher

Semra Sezer (née Kürümoğlu; born August 16, 1944) was the First Lady of Turkey from May 2000 until August 2007 during the presidency of her husband Ahmet Necdet Sezer.

She was born on August 16, 1944, in Yenimahalle, Ankara to the family of a bank officer, Kemal Kürümoğlu. She completed her secondary education in 1962 at the Yenimahalle High School in Ankara.

She met her husband Ahmet Necdet Sezer while a student at the Law School of Ankara University. The couple were engaged in 1962. She then left the Law School in her second year, and attended the Atatürk Teachers' School for Primary Education in Ankara to become a teacher.

After the completion of her fiancé's military service, the couple married in 1964 and moved to Dicle town in Diyarbakır Province, where her husband was appointed as a judge. In 1966, she mothered their first child, a daughter named Zeynep. Later, the family moved to Yerköy in Yozgat Province due to Ahmet Necdet Sezer's next appointment. In Yerköy, the twins, daughter Ebru and son Levent, were born.

In 1975, the family finally moved to Ankara, where they lived from then on. Following her service of more than 30 years, Semra Sezer attended Faculty of Education at the Hacettepe University graduating in 1996 with a bachelor's degree. She became a grandmother through the birth of her oldest daughter, Zeynep's baby in 1998.

Semra Sezer served as a teacher for primary school in Dicle, Yerköy and Ankara until her retirement on January 28, 2000.

Semra Sezer is known for her modest way of life adequate to her husband's. She did not color her gray hair, paint her nails or wear jewelry. During her time as the first lady, she also avoided the media. Once, she lined up for physical examination in the hospital that is not usual.

Semra Sezer lives with her husband in Gölbaşı, Ankara.
