= AJet =

Low-cost airline of Turkey

AJet Ajet Hava Taşımacılığı Anonim Şirketi

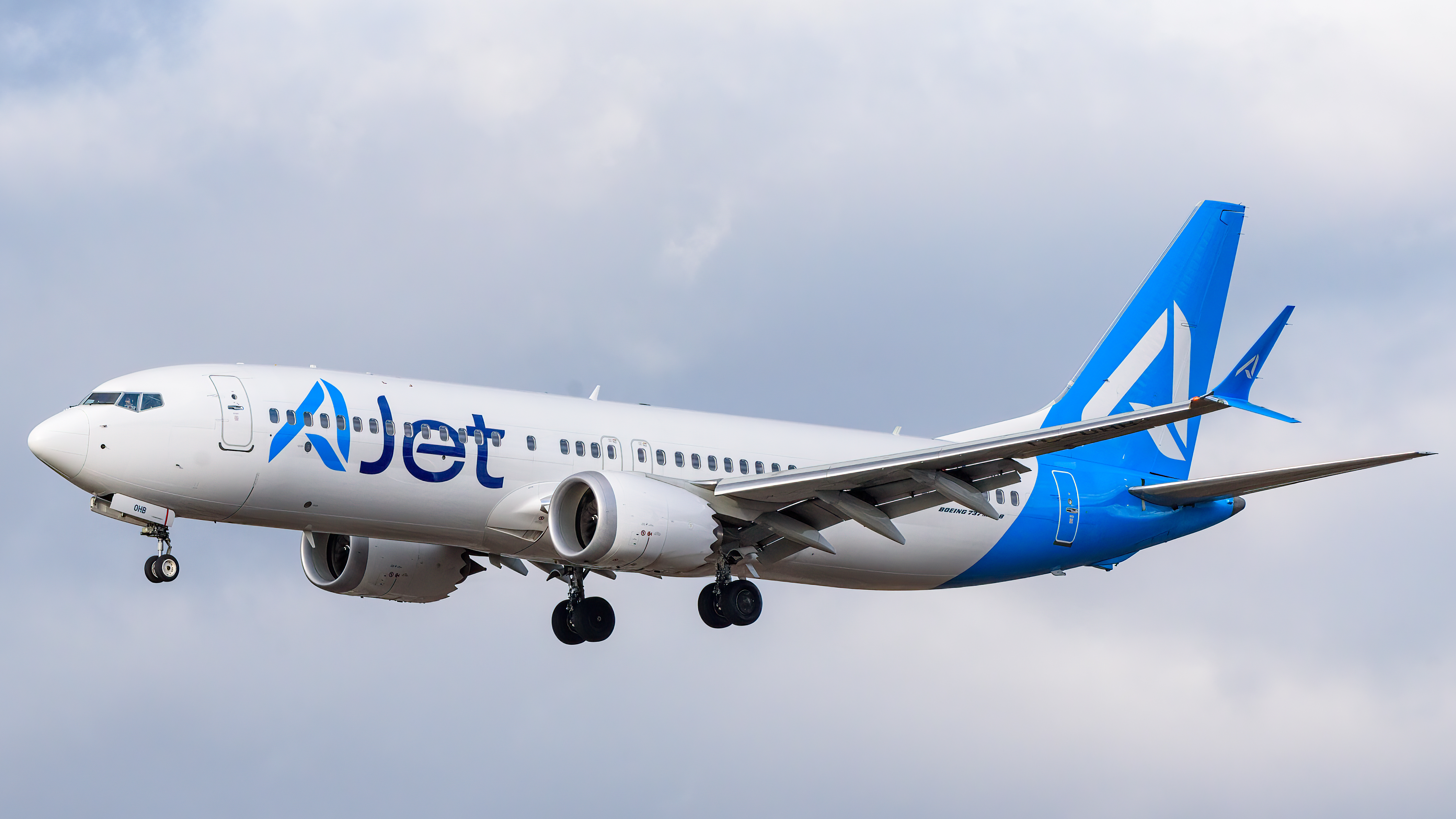
- AJet Boeing 737 MAX 8
IATA	ICAO	Call sign
VF	TKJ	ANATOLIA
- Founded: 23 April 2008; 18 years ago (as AnadoluJet)
- Commenced operations: 1 April 2024; 2 years ago (as AJet)
- Operating bases: Ankara; Antalya; Istanbul–Sabiha Gökçen
- Fleet size: 86
- Destinations: 93
- Parent company: Turkish Airlines
- Headquarters: Istanbul, Turkey
- Key people: Kerem Sarp (CEO)
- Website: www.ajet.com

AJet (branded as AnadoluJet until 31 March 2024) is a Turkish low-cost airline operating domestic flights as well as international flights to Northern Cyprus, Europe and Western Asia from its base at Sabiha Gökçen International Airport. It is a subsidiary of Turkish Airlines which previously operated it as a trademark before becoming an independent airline.

== History ==
=== AnadoluJet ===
The AnadoluJet trademark used by Turkish Airlines until March 2024

AnadoluJet was created on 23 April 2008 as a trademark by Turkish Airlines. In March 2020, the brand was reconfigured to apply to the entire Turkish Airlines international route network operating from Istanbul Sabiha Gökçen International Airport, consisting of over 20 routes.

=== AJet ===
In February 2023, Turkish Airlines confirmed plans to spin off AnadoluJet from an incorporated brand name into an independent airline with the name AJet Hava Taşımacılığı Anonim Şirketi (English: AJet Air Transportation Joint Stock Company), but it will continue to be a 100% subsidiary of Turkish Airlines. Turkish Airlines said in a stock market disclosure that the new company was incorporated on 14 July 2023, with an initial paid-up capital of TRY450 million (EUR15.75 million), and will continue operating as a low-cost carrier.

In November 2023, Turkish Airlines unveiled the airline's new branding and livery. The airline was to operate as a fully owned low-cost subsidiary of Turkish Airlines. It also announced plans to acquire a separate AOC for the carrier.

On 2 January 2024, AnadoluJet received its own independent air operator's certificate ahead of its rebranding due in early 2024. It is subsequently rebranded into its new corporate identity as AJet on 1 April 2024.

== Destinations ==
Countries served by AJet as of March 2026

AJet operates flights to domestic and international destinations in several countries across Europe, Asia and Africa.

=== Codeshare agreements ===
AJet additionally maintains codeshare agreements with its parent company Turkish Airlines.

== Fleet ==
=== Current fleet ===
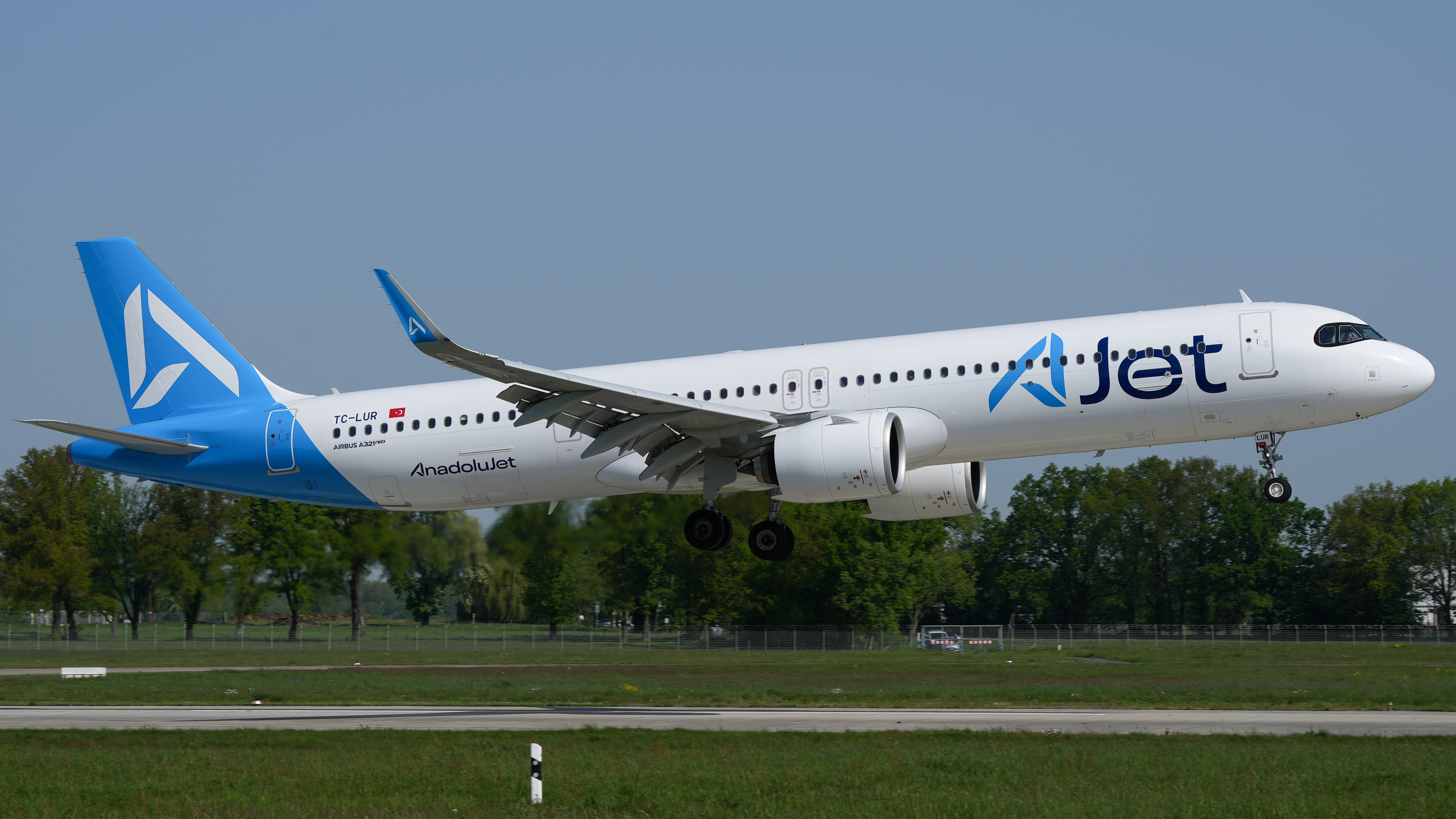
AJet Airbus A321neo

As of December 2025, AJet operates an all-narrow-body fleet composed of the following aircraft:

AJet fleet
Aircraft	In service	Orders	Passengers			Notes
Aircraft	In service	Orders	J	Y	Total	Notes
Airbus A320-200	5	—	—			
Airbus A320neo	27	—	—	186	186	Originally ordered by S7 Airlines. Some former Go First and IndiGo aircraft will also join the fleet.
Airbus A321-200	8	—	—	220	220	Leased from SmartLynx Airlines and SmartLynx Airlines Malta.
Airbus A321neo	17	—	8	203	211	Originally ordered by S7 Airlines.
Airbus A321neo	17	—	—	240	240	
Boeing 737-800	44	—	—	186	186	Most transferred from Turkish Airlines.
Boeing 737-800	44	—	—	189	189	Most transferred from Turkish Airlines.
Boeing 737 MAX 8	25	2	8	168	176	Originally ordered by S7 Airlines.
Boeing 737 MAX 8	25	2	—	189	189	
Total	126	2				

And they also restored 2 Airbus A320ceos as of August 1, before that, it was retired temporarily and only Turkish Airlines livery was used.

=== Historic fleet ===
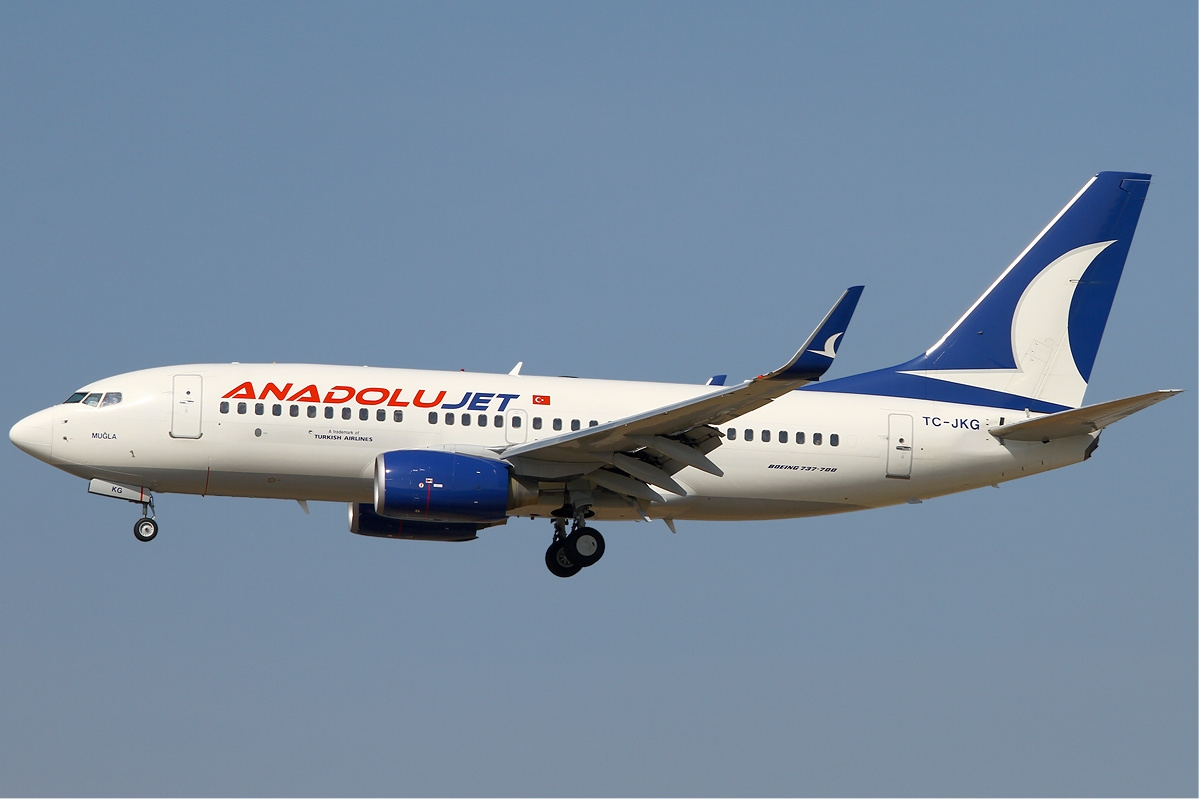
Former AnadoluJet 737-700 wearing its original livery in 2011

AJet and formerly AnadoluJet had also operated the following aircraft types in the past:

Former AnadoluJet fleet
Aircraft	Total	Introduced	Retired	Notes
ATR 72-500	2	2010	2014	Operated by Borajet.
Boeing 737-400	8	2008	2010	
Boeing 737-700	10	2012	2016	
Embraer E190	3	2015	2016	Operated by Borajet.
Embraer E195	3	2015	2016	Operated by Borajet.

== See also ==
- Pegasus Airlines
