= Borajet =

Privately owned Turkish airline

IATA	ICAO	Call sign
YB	BRJ	BORA JET
- Founded: 2008
- Commenced operations: 8 May 2010
- Ceased operations: 24 April 2017
- Operating bases: Sabiha Gökçen International Airport
- Frequent-flyer program: fly borajet
- Fleet size: 8
- Destinations: 20 scheduled
- Parent company: SBK Holding
- Headquarters: Istanbul, Turkey
- Key people: Yalçın Ayaslı (Founder); Fatih Akol (Chairman of the Board)
- Website: www.borajet.com.tr

Borajet (Turkish: Borajet Havayolları) was a privately owned Turkish airline based in Yeşilköy, Bakırköy, Istanbul operating domestic and international services. It suspended operations on 24 April 2017.

== History ==
=== Early years ===
The airline was founded in 2008 by Yalcin Ayasli, a Turkish businessman living in the US. Fatih Akol is chairman of the board. The company rented a hangar at Atatürk International Airport, Istanbul and then purchased three second-hand ATR 72-500 turboprop aircraft, which were delivered at the beginning of 2010.

Borajet received its "Regional Airline Operations License" on 22 April 2010 and started operations on 7 May 2010 with its first flight from Istanbul to Tokat.

In 2014, Borajet agreed a deal to lease five Embraer 190 aircraft (with options on a further three) from GE Capital Aviation Services. In October 2016 Borajet announced long-term lease deals with AerCap for three Embraer 190-E2 and two Embraer 195-E2 aircraft, with deliveries to begin in 2018. In January 2017 the airline was sold to Sezgin Baran Korkmaz for 260 Million Dollars.

=== Suspension of operations ===
On 24 April 2017, Borajet announced that they will temporarily suspend their operations and 30,000 existing flight reservations would be transferred to Turkish Airlines. The airline stated maintenance issues as a reason for this move and plans to resume operations sometime during 2018 when Istanbul's new international airport becomes operational. In June 2017, a Turkish court ordered that seven aircraft of the company are to be seized.

As of January 2021, the airline did not resume its operations.

== Destinations ==
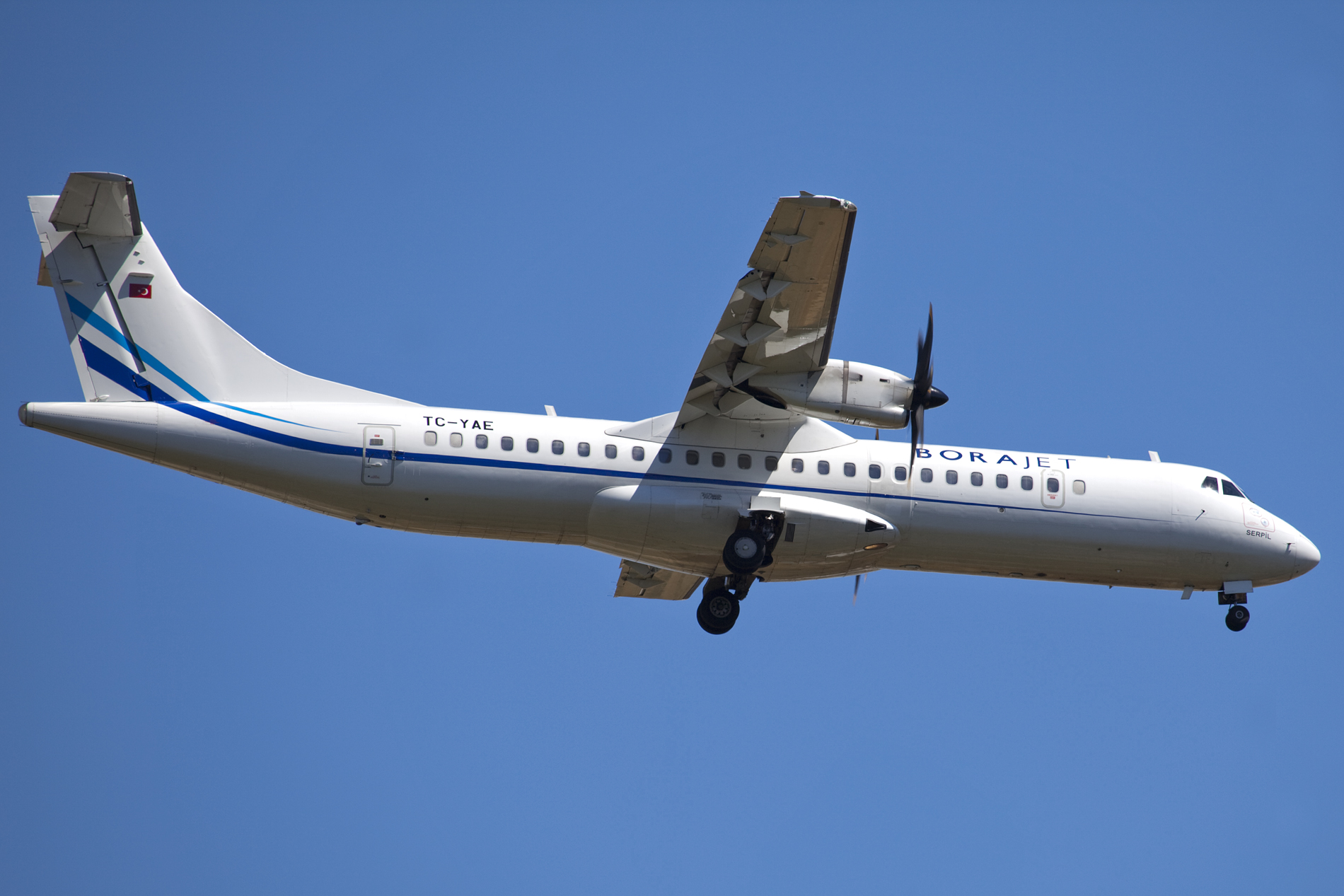
Former Borajet ATR 72-500 in 2012

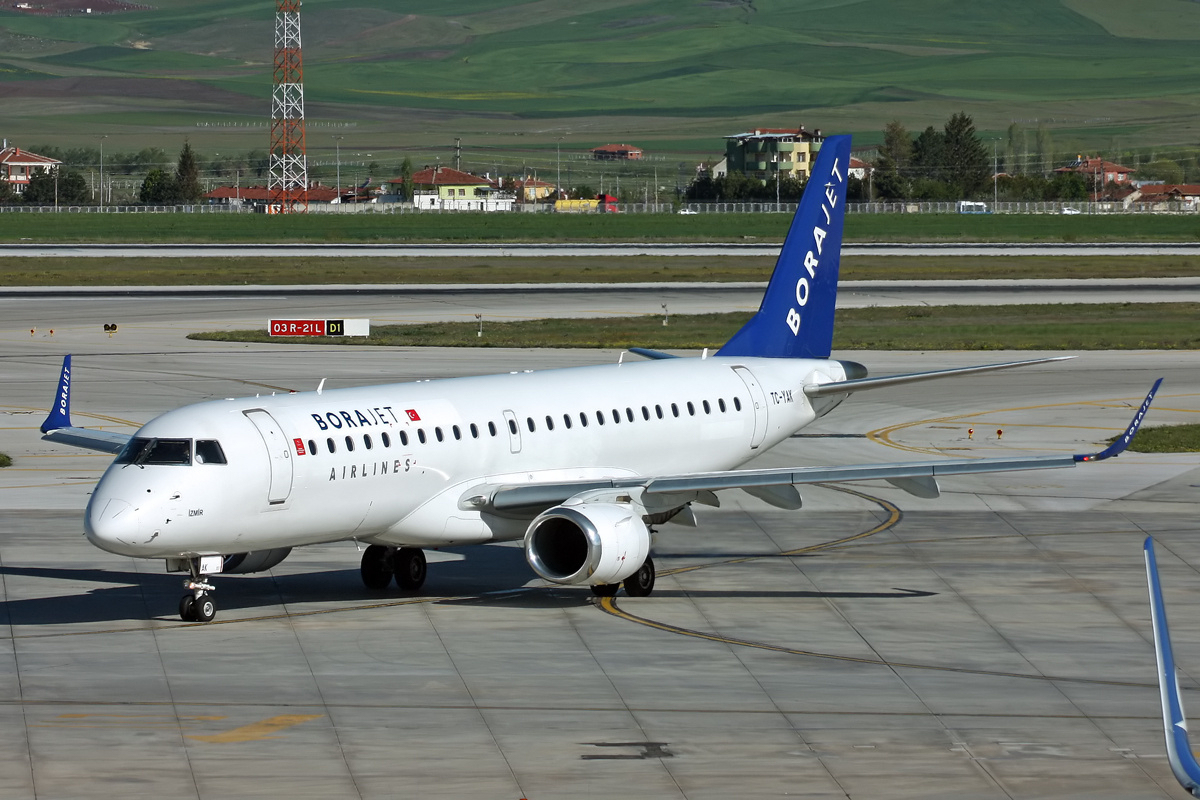
Borajet Embraer 190

Prior to the suspension of operations in April 2017, Borajet served the following scheduled destinations. Several more airports in Europe and the Middle East were served as charters while more domestic destinations were operated on a wet-lease basis.

Germany

- Berlin – Berlin Tegel Airport
- Cologne/Bonn – Cologne Bonn Airport
- Munich – Munich Airport

Greece

- Mykonos – Mykonos Island National Airport
- Rhodes - Rhodes International Airport

Iraq

- Erbil - Erbil International Airport

Lebanon

- Beirut - Beirut Rafic Hariri International Airport

Northern Cyprus

- Nicosia - Ercan International Airport

Spain

- Ibiza - Ibiza Airport

Turkey

- Adana - Adana Şakirpaşa Airport
- Alanya – Gazipaşa Airport
- Ankara – Esenboğa International Airport
- Antalya – Antalya Airport
- Bodrum - Milas–Bodrum Airport
- Çanakkale – Çanakkale Airport
- Diyarbakır – Diyarbakır Airport
- Edremit – Balikesir Koca Seyit Airport
- Istanbul – Sabiha Gökçen International Airport Base
- İzmir - Adnan Menderes Airport
- Siirt – Siirt Airport

=== Codeshare agreements ===
Borajet also maintained codeshare agreements with the following airlines:

- AnadoluJet

== Fleet ==
As of April 2017 - prior to the suspension of operations - the Borajet fleet included the following aircraft:

Borajet Airlines Fleet
Aircraft	In Fleet	Orders	Passengers	Notes
Embraer 190	3	—	100	
Embraer 195	5	—	118	1 painted in Fenerbahçe S.K. special livery
Embraer 190-E2	—	3	TBA	
Embraer 195-E2	—	2	TBA	
Total	8	5		
