= İrfan Özaydınlı =

Minister of Internal Affairs of Turkey
- In office 5 January 1978 – 2 January 1979
- President: Fahri Korutürk
- Preceded by: Korkut Özal
- Succeeded by: Hasan Fehmi Güneş

Personal details
- Born: 1924 Aydın, Turkey
- Died: 1 August 1999 (aged 75) Istanbul, Turkey

İrfan Özaydınlı (1924, Aydın, Turkey – August 1, 1999, Istanbul) was a Turkish soldier and politician.

== Biography ==
Özaydınlı, who was born in 1924 in Aydın, completed his primary and secondary education in 1939 and then entered the Kuleli Military High School and started his military service. After finishing the Military Academy in 1943, he travelled to England for 2 years pilotage training. In various stages of the Turkish Air Force, volunteers, flight instructors and union commanders were in charge.

Decree was prepared for the appointment of İrfan Özaydınlı. However, Süleyman Demirel's Özaydınlı's Command was withdrawn by removing the approval of Prime Minister Özgül. On April 24, Lieutenant General Cemal Engin was appointed Commander of the Air Force when he was not in his ranks. However, Özaydınlı, who was on the ranks of his country, sued for the cancellation of the appointment. The Supreme Military Administrative Court has annulled the appointment of Lieutenant General Engin. Ethem Ayan became Air Command Commander. Özaydınlı left the Turkish Armed Forces between his generals and the members of the Supreme Military Council (6 April 1977). In the 1977 general elections, he was elected deputy to the Republican People's Party (CHP) from Balıkesir. Bülent Ecevit was founded in 1978 and served as Interior Minister in the government. After the events of Kahramanmaraş that took place in December 1978, he resigned from the Ministry of Interior. After his departure from the Ministry, he served as the Chairman of the Turkish Parliamentary Committee of NATO North Atlantic Assemblies from 1979 to 1982.

Özaydınlı died in İstanbul on 1 August 1999.

Legal offices
Preceded by Korkut Özal	Minister of Internal Affairs of Turkey; 5 January 1978 - 2 January 1979	Succeeded by Hasan Fehmi Güneş
