= Sezgin Baran Korkmaz =

Turkish businessman

Sezgin Baran Korkmaz (1977 Digor, Kars) is a Kurdish businessman and chairman of the SBK holding. In June 2021, he was arrested in Austria on request of a court in the United States.

== Biography ==
According to his own account he was a shoe shiner in his childhood. He is known as a charitable figure in Turkey where he provided scholarships to students in Kars and also Syrian refugees. He is also reported to be the owner of several companies in the energy sector and the pharmaceutical industry. He was the founding majority shareholder of the Konak heat in 2009. In 2016, the SBK holding partnered together with American Washakie Renewable Energy as the latter wanted to make investments in Turkey. Through the SBK Holding he bought the airline Borajet in 2017 for 260 million dollars from Yalçin Ayasli. The Turkish Interior Minister Süleyman Soylu, used a Bombardier business jet from Borajet during the campaign for the Constitutional Referendum in 2017. The Organized Crime and Corruption Reporting Project reports that Korkmaz together with American businessmen was involved in an attempt to liberate the christian pastor Andrew Brunson from Turkish detention in October 2018. He is also credited with having organized meetings with Turkish president Recep Tayyip Erdogan for his American business-partner now prosecuted in the USA.

=== Legal prosecution ===
In late September 2020, a Court in Istanbul ordered the confiscation of the assets owned by Korkmaz in Turkey together with a prohibition to leave the country. On 17 November his assets however where released and he was allowed to travel again by a Turkish court. Korkmaz left Turkey on the 5 December 2020 while ten executives of his companies were arrested on money laundering related charges. According to the Turkish mafia boss Sedat Peker Korkmaz was adverted of an eventual prosecution and arrest by the Interior Minister Soylu and according to Duvar, he was able to sell several of his properties in Turkey before they were confiscated. In late December 2020 an arrest warrant was released for him in Turkey on grounds of his financial partnership with executives of the Washakie Renewable Energy, who both pleaded guilty before a court in Utah. In April 2021 it was reported that he was in Switzerland, and on the 19 June 2021 he was arrested by the Austrian authorities for money laundering over the sum of $133 Million, which he re-invested in the purchase of properties in Switzerland and Turkey, the Turkish airline Borajet, and a yacht called Queen Anne. The United States have demanded his extradition from Austria on a request of judge Jill Parrish of the District Court of Utah. After Austria approved the extradition to both Turkey and the USA, in July 2022 the latter was preferred as in the USA the crimes were initially detected and the potential victims were primarily residing in that country.

On July 15, 2022, Korkmaz was extradited from Austria to the United States to face money laundering and wire fraud charges.
