= Yalçın Ayaslı =

Turkish-American business executive

- Born: 1946 (age 79–80); Ankara, Turkey
- Education: Middle East Technical University (B.E., '68) Massachusetts Institute of Technology (M.S.E.E. & Sc.D. '73)
- Occupations: Electrical Engineer, Entrepreneur, Manager
- Spouse: Serpil Ayasli
- Children: Ceylan, Orhan, Bahar

Yalçın Ayaslı (born 1946) is a Turkish-American business executive and electrical engineer.

== Education ==
A graduate of the Ankara Atatürk High School, Ayasli received his B.S. in electrical engineering from the Middle East Technical University Electrical Engineering Department in 1968. Yalcin Ayasli received his M.S.E.E. and Sc.D. degrees from Massachusetts Institute of Technology in 1973 and worked as a faculty member and Deputy Department Chair at the METU Electrical Engineering Department for six years.

== Career ==
A Massachusetts (MA) resident in 1979-2006, and NH resident since 2006, Ayasli has conducted theoretical and experimental studies on Microwave Monolithic Integrated Circuit techniques involving GaAs Field-Effect Transistors and related devices. He began his professional career at the MA based Raytheon's research division. In 1985, he founded Hittite Microwave Corporation, a public company traded on Nasdaq, in Chelmsford, MA. The company is a supplier of mixed signal RFIC and Microwave and Millimeter-Wave Integrated Circuit components and subsystems for wireless and telecommunication markets. After serving as the company's CEO and Chairman of the Board for 20 years, Ayasli served as Chairman Emeritus until the company was purchased by Analog Devices Inc. in 2014 for $2.45 billion. In 2017 he sold the airline Borajet to the SBK Holding of Sezgin Baran Korkmaz.

Ayasli is the author of numerous scientific papers in this research area and holds 15 patents. He was the General Chairman for the 1987 IEEE Microwave and Millimeter Wave Monolithic Circuits Symposium.

Ayasli is founder and chairman of two US public charitable organizations; Turkish Cultural Foundation and Turkish Coalition of America. Both organizations have offices in Boston, Washington, D.C. and Istanbul.

Ayasli also established the Culinary Arts Center and Cultural Heritage Preservation and Natural Dyes Laboratory in Istanbul.

In 2012, he donated the Ayasli Research Center to his alma mater, Middle East Technical University Engineering Department.

Yalcin Ayasli also is a member of the High Advisory Board of the World Turkish Business Council. The board last met in Istanbul on June 7, 2012.

In addition, Ayasli is an investor in the Borajet, Armaggan and Nar companies in Turkey.

== Awards ==
- 1986 — IEEE Microwave Prize
- 1994 — IEEE Fellow for contribution to the design and development of wide-band gallium arsenide (GaAs) monolithic microwave integrated circuits (MMICs).
- 2011 — Macedonia Friendship Award
