= Murat Yalçıntaş =

Turkish businessman (born 1965)

- Murat Yalçıntaş
- Born: 1965 (age 60–61); Istanbul
- Education: Saint Joseph French Lycée, Boğaziçi University
- Occupations: Businessman, civic leader
- Spouse: Karin Ayşe Yalçıntaş
- Awards: Legion D'Honneur

Murat Yalçıntaş is a businessman and civic leader in Istanbul, Turkey.

== Personal life and educationb ==
His father was Nevzat Yalçıntaş. Murat began his education (1977–1984) at Saint Joseph French Lycée in Istanbul. He studied mechanical engineering at Boğaziçi University and holds a Joint master's degree (1988–1990) from Boston University and Vrije Universiteit Brussel in Corporate Management. He completed his Ph.D. at the Faculty of Management, Istanbul University, focusing on customer service in the service industry. A father of three, Yalçıntaş speaks fluent English and French and intermediate German and Arabic.

== Experience ==
Throughout his career, Dr. Murat Yalçıntaş has held various positions at different institutions and organizations, including the following:

- 2009 – Vice-President of the Union of Chambers and Commodity Exchanges of Turkey (TOBB)
- 2009 – Istanbul Chamber of Commerce (ICOC) Committee Member (Sanitation System and Climate Control Committee)
- 2007 – President of the Association of the Mediterranean Chambers of Commerce and Industry (ASCAME)
- 2007 – Vice-President of the Turkish Wushu Federation
- 2006 – President of the Istanbul Convention Visitors Bureau (ICVB)
- 2006 – President of the Tourism Development and Education Foundation (TUGEV)
- 2005 – Member of the Istanbul Commerce University (İTİCÜ) Board of Trustees
- 2005 – Deputy Chairman of the Board of Directors of the Istanbul World Trade Center
- 2005 – President of the Istanbul Chamber of Commerce (ICOC),
- 2005 - 2009 Istanbul Chamber of Commerce (ICOC) Committee Member (Metal Goods Branch Committee)
- 2001 - 2005 Vice-President of the Justice and Development Party (AK Party), Istanbul Province
- 2001 – Member of the AK Party Board of Founders
- 2001–2003 Istanbul Chamber of Commerce (ICOC) Metal Goods Branch Committee Member
- 1998 - 2001 Vice-President of the Fazilet (Virtue) Party, Istanbul Province
- 1996 - 1998 Member of the Board of Directors of the Independent Industrialists and Businessmen Association (MÜSİAD)
- 1995 - 2001 Istanbul Chamber of Commerce (ICOC) Committee Member (Metal Goods Branch Committee Member)
- 1991 - 1994 Islamic Development Bank, Project Head, Jeddah
- 1989 - 1990 European Union Research Specialist, Brussels

== Honors ==
Murat Yalçıntaş has received various awards, some of which are listed below:

- 2010 - France / Légion d'Honneur
- 2010 - Italy State Medal, Commendatore
- 2009 - Kyrgyzstan Presidential Academy, Honorary Professor
- 2009 - Istanbul Social Sciences High School, Economist of the Year Award
- 2008 - Istanbul Exporters Association, Honor Award for Export Service
- 2008 - TRUE Avrupa Dergisi (TRUE Europe Magazine), Honor Plaque
- 2008 - Istanbul Governor's Office, Honor Award
- 2006 - Platin Ekonomi Dergisi (Platinum Economics Magazine) Social Responsibility Award
- 2006 - GAP Journalists Association, Association President of the Year Award
- 2006 - Siyaset Dergisi (Politics Magazine), Association President of the Year Award
- 2000 - Independent Industrialists and Businessmen Association (MÜSİAD), Certificate of Achievement
