= Ahmetçe, Ayvacık =

Village in Turkey

Ahmetçe
- Village
- Location in Turkey Ahmetçe (Marmara)
- Coordinates: 39.5489°N 26.4942°E
- Country: Turkey
- Province: Çanakkale
- District: Ayvacık
- Population (2021): 461
- Time zone: UTC+3 (TRT)

Ahmetçe is a village in the Ayvacık District of Çanakkale Province in Turkey. Its population is 461 (2021).
