= Korkut Özal =

Turkish politician (1929–2016)

Minister of the Interior
- In office 21 July 1977 – 5 January 1978
- President: Fahri Korutürk
- Preceded by: Necdet Uğur
- Succeeded by: İrfan Özaydınlı

Minister of Food, Agriculture and Livestock
- In office 1 April 1975 – 21 June 1977
- President: Fahri Korutürk
- Preceded by: Reşat Aktan
- Succeeded by: Fikret Gündoğan
- In office 26 January 1974 – 16 November 1974
- President: Fahri Korutürk
- Preceded by: Ahmet Nusret Tuna
- Succeeded by: Fikret Gündoğan

Member of the Grand National Assembly
- In office 24 December 1995 – 18 April 1999
- Constituency: Istanbul (1995)
- In office 14 October 1973 – 12 September 1980
- Constituency: Erzurum (1973, 1977)

Personal details
- Born: 29 May 1929 Malatya, Turkey
- Died: 2 November 2016 (aged 87) Istanbul, Turkey
- Children: 5
- Relatives: Özal family

Korkut Özal (29 May 1929 – 2 November 2016) was a Turkish engineer and politician. He was the brother of Turkish President Turgut Özal and Yusuf Bozkurt Özal. His cause of death in 2016 was respiratory and circulatory failure.

== Academic career ==
Korkut Özal studied at the Faculty of Civil Engineering at Istanbul Technical University. He then completed his postgraduate studies in the United States between 1956 and 1957. He became an academic at the Middle East Technical University after returning to Turkey. In 1965, he was awarded a professorship and became a lecturer at the State Academy of Architecture and Engineering.

== Early political career ==
Özal entered politics through the National Salvation Party; he was elected as the party's deputy for Erzurum in the 1973 and 1977 elections. In 1974, he was the minister of food, agriculture, and livestock in the CHP-MSP coalition government, and later in the first Nationalist Front cabinet established in 1975. He served as the interior minister in the second Nationalist Front cabinet in 1977 for six months. Shortly after the 1980 Turkish coup d'état Korkut Özal suffered a traffic accident on 25 September 1980, and withdrew from politics.

== Later political life ==
His brother, Turgut Özal, served as president until his death in 1993, after which Korkut Özal re-entered politics through the Motherland Party and was elected as an Istanbul deputy in 1995. He chaired the Turkish Parliament’s Home Affairs Commission and the Turkish Parliamentary Group of the OSCE. He was critical of many of the policies of the Anasol-D government and resigned from the Motherland Party on 13 August 1997. He joined the newly established Democratic Party and was elected president of the party at the congress on 28 September 1997. On 22 March 2001, he left the chairmanship of the Democratic Party.

=== Influence ===
Özal was active in the İlim Yayma Foundation and was mentor of many significant conservative politicians, including Kadir Topbaş, Ahmet Davutoğlu, Ali Coşkun, Mehmet Aydın and Nevzat Yalçıntaş. In addition, he was close to the leading members of the Justice and Development Party.

== Death ==
Korkut Özal died on 2 November 2016, at his home in Istanbul. He was buried in the family plot in the Topkapi cemetery.

| Preceded by Necdet Uğur | Minister of Internal Affairs of Turkey; 21 July 1977 - 5 January 1978 | Succeeded by İrfan Özaydınlı |
| Preceded by Reşat Aktan | Turkey Minister of Food, Agriculture and Livestock; 1 April 1975 - 21 June 1977 | Succeeded by Fikret Gündoğan |
| Preceded by Ahmet Nusret Tuna | Turkey Minister of Food, Agriculture and Livestock; 26 November 1974 - 16 November 1974 | Succeeded by Reşat Aktan |
