= Özalp =

Özalp may refer to:

- Özalp (given name), a Turkish given name
- Özalp, Van, a district of Van Province, Turkey
- Kâzım Özalp (1880–1968), Turkish military officer
