= Semra Özal =

First lady of Turkey from 1989 to 1993

First Lady of Turkey
- In role 9 November 1989 – 17 April 1993
- President: Turgut Özal
- Preceded by: Sekine Evren
- Succeeded by: Nazmiye Demirel

Spouse of the Prime Minister of Turkey
- In role 13 December 1983 – 31 October 1989
- Prime Minister: Turgut Özal
- Preceded by: Nazmiye Demirel (1980)
- Succeeded by: Saime Akbulut

Provincial President of the Motherland Party in Istanbul
- In office 1991–1992

Personal details
- Born: Semra Yeğinmen; 12 January 1934 (age 92) Istanbul, Turkey
- Spouse: Turgut Özal (m. 1954; died 1993)
- Relations: Özal family
- Children: 3, including Ahmet

Semra Özal (née Yeğinmen; born 12 January 1934) is the widow of Turgut Özal, who served as the eighth president of Turkey from 1989 to 1993 and as prime minister from 1983 to 1989. During her husband's presidency, she was the first lady of Turkey. The couple had three children: Ahmet (born 1955), Zeynep (born 1956) and Efe (born 1967).

During the government of the Motherland Party (ANAP), she presided over the Turkish Women Empowerment and Promotion Foundation, also known as the "Daisies" (Papatyalar). From 1991 to 1992, she was the head of ANAP's provincial organization in Istanbul, where she currently lives.

== See also ==
- Özal family
- List of prime ministers of Turkey
