= Nevzat Yalçıntaş =

Turkish academic and politician (1933–2016)

- Born: 1933; Keskin, Turkey
- Died: 16 July 2016 (aged 82–83); Çatalca, Istanbul, Turkey
- Resting place: New Topkapi Cemetery, Istanbul
- Education: Istanbul Higher School of Economics and Commerce; Caen University
- Children: 2
- Scientific career
- Fields: Economics
- Workplaces: Ankara University; Istanbul University
- Notable students: Abdullah Gül

Nevzat Yalçıntaş (1933–2016) was a Turkish economist, academic and conservative politician. He worked at Ankara University and Istanbul University. He headed a conservative think entitled Intellectuals' Hearth from 1988 to 1998. He served at the Parliament for two terms: from 1999 to 2002 and from 2007 and 2011.

== Early life and education ==
Yalçıntaş was born in Keskin in 1933 and was raised in Ankara. He had nine siblings.

Yalçıntaş graduated from Ankara Commerce High School in 1951 and from Istanbul Higher School of Economics and Commerce in 1954. During his university education he became a member of the Nationalists Association (Turkish: Milliyetçiler Derneği) of which the president was Sait Bilgiç, a politician. Yalçıntaş received his Ph.D. in economics in 1957 from the Caen University, France.

== Career and activities ==
After his graduation, Yalçıntaş started his career as an expert at the General Directorate of State Hydraulic Works. He joined Ankara University's Faculty of Political Sciences in 1959. Then he joined Istanbul University's Faculty of Economics where he worked until his retirement in 1999. He was a visiting scholar at the London School of Economics and Social Sciences between 1962 and 1963. He became an associate professor in 1965 and a full professor in 1971 at Istanbul University. One of his notable pupils at Istanbul University was Abdullah Gül, former President of Turkey.

Yalçıntaş was active in the Turkish National Student Union. He worked at the State Planning Organization from 1965. He served as a member of the European Migrant Workers Board between 1973 and 1975. He was named as the director general of the Turkish Radio and Television Corporation (TRT) on 12 May 1975, and his appointment was accepted by President Fahri Korutürk. However, İsmail Cem who had been the director general of TRT appealed to the Council of State to annul the Presidential decree. In addition, the parliamentary group of the Republican People's Party also applied to the Constitutional Court arguing that the decree in question was unconstitutional. On 5 June 1975, the Council of State validated İsmail Cem's request. The cabinet led by Süleyman Demirel objected to the decision of the Council of State, but the Council rejected this objection. Ultimately, Yalçıntaş had to resign from the post on 24 November 1975.

Yalçıntaş was the president of the Research and Training Institute of the Islamic Development Bank based in Jeddah, Saudi Arabia, between 1982 and 1986 and the chief counselor and then chairman of the Advisory Board of the Union of Chambers and Commodity Exchanges of Turkey (TOBB) between 1986 and 1990. He also served as a senior consultant to many private companies.

Yalçıntaş was the president of the conservative think thank Intellectuals' Hearth from 1988 to 1998. Then he was involved in politics becoming a member of the Virtue Party. He was elected to the Parliament for the party representing Istanbul and served in the 21st term between 1999 and 2002. Later he joined the Justice and Development Party and served in the 23rd term of the Parliament as an Istanbul deputy between 2007 and 2011.

=== Work and views ===
Yalçıntaş published many books, book chapters, articles, reports and communiqués mainly on Turkey's social structure and social politics. Some of his publications have been published in the German, Arabic, English and Japanese languages. He also contributed to Tercüman and was the editor-in-chief of the daily newspaper Türkiye.

Yalçıntaş was part of the Community of İskenderpaşa. He had a nationalist-conservatist political stance. One of his mentors in this ideology was Korkut Özal.

== Personal life and death ==
Yalçıntaş was married and had two children. His son, Murat Yalçıntaş, is a businessman. He was fluent in French, English and Arabic.

Yalçıntaş died of heart attack in Çatalca, Istanbul, on 15 July 2016 at the age of 83. After the funeral prayer at Fatih Mosque he was buried in New Topkapı Cemetery, Istanbul, on 17 July.
