= Ahmet Özal =

Turkish politician (born 1955)

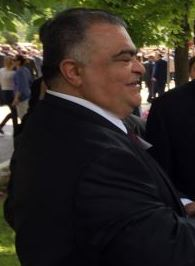

Member of the Grand National Assembly
- In office 18 April 1999 – 3 November 2002
- Constituency: Malatya (1999)

Personal details
- Born: 3 December 1955 (age 70) Ankara, Turkey
- Spouse(s): Elvan Özal Asuman Duran (m. 2022)
- Children: 2
- Parent(s): Turgut Özal; Semra Özal
- Relatives: Özal family
- Education: North Carolina State University

Tevfik Ahmet Özal (born 3 December 1955) is a Turkish politician, the son of former Turkish President and Prime Minister Turgut Özal and a member of the Özal family. He has been an MP, and co-founded the Uzan Group and later the Özal Group.

== Career ==
After graduating from the North Carolina State University he worked at the International Monetary Fund and in international banking from 1979 to 1988. In 1989 he co-founded (with Cem Uzan) Turkey's first private television station, "Magic Box" (now Star TV).

Özal was elected to the Grand National Assembly of Turkey in 1999 as an independent MP; he joined the Motherland Party in 2002, and was the party's candidate for Mayor of Istanbul in the March 2009 local elections (gaining less than 1% of the vote). Later, he would become Deputy Chairman of the Democratic Party, after the Motherland Party merged with it in October 2009.

Since taking public office, he has adamantly stated that he feels his late father, former Turkish President and Prime Minister Turgut Özal, was assassinated. He has suggested that the Soviet Union might have been responsible, because of Turgut's efforts to unite the Turkic republics of Central Asia. In 2013 Özal said that several months before the 1988 assassination attempt on Turgut, Turgut had survived a plane incident in which his official plane lost an engine and crash-landed (Ahmet was on board at the time). The manufacturer later reported a 95% probability that the plane would explode under the circumstances present.

He is on the Board of Trustees of Turgut Özal University, named after his father.

On 23 July 2016, in the course of the 2016 Turkish purges, the university was shut down by the Turkish government among other 15 universities due to its alleged ties with the Gülen movement.
