= Özal family =

Turkish family

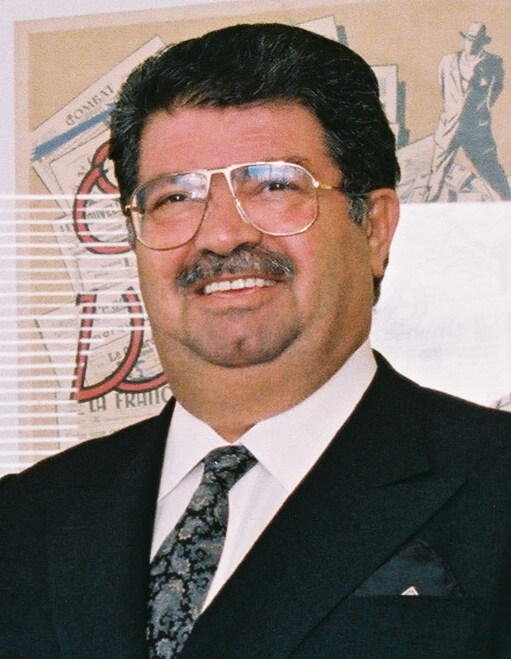
- Turgut Özal, President of Turkey (1989–1993), and Prime Minister of Turkey (1983–1989)
- Country: Turkey
- Founded: 1970; 56 years ago
- Founder: Turgut Özal
- Connected members: Yeğinmen family
- Traditions: Sunni Islam

The Özal family is a political family in Turkey, the most prominent member being Turgut Özal, the 8th President (1989–1993) and Prime Minister of Turkey (1983–1989).

The family has been active in Turkish politics since the 1970s. Özal was a popular political figure in Turkey and founded the Motherland Party in 1983, which won the general elections of the same year. After his death in 1993, his son Ahmet Özal succeeded him as the de facto patriarch of the family.

== Members of Özal family ==
- Mehmet Sıddık Özal (1900–1953) and Hafize (1906–1988):
  - Turgut Özal (1927–1993) and Semra Yeğinmen (born 1934):
    - Zeynep Özal (born 1955), businesswoman
    - Ahmet Özal (born 1955), politician and businessman
    - Efe Özal (born 1968), businessman
  - Korkut Özal (1929–2014), politician
    - F. Zehra Özal
    - Murat Mehmet Özal (1955–2013), businessman
    - H. Ayşegül Özal
    - M. Ali Özal
    - A. Bahaddin Özal
  - Yusuf Bozkurt Özal (1940–2001), politician
    - İbrahim Reyhan Özal (born 1965 in London), politician
    - Elif Özal Danışman (born 1968 in Ankara)
    - Yasemin Özal Fırat (born 1971 in Ankara)

== Politics ==
Turgut Özal's son, Ahmet, remained in parliament until 2002. His younger brother Efe stayed out of politics and is a businessman. Efe's son, Kaan Turgut Özal, who was born the day after his grandfather Turgut's burial in 1993 and was named after him, briefly said in an interview that he was interested in politics and wanted to follow in his grandfather's footsteps.

== See also ==
- Özal University
