= Turgut Özal =

President of Turkey from 1989 to 1993

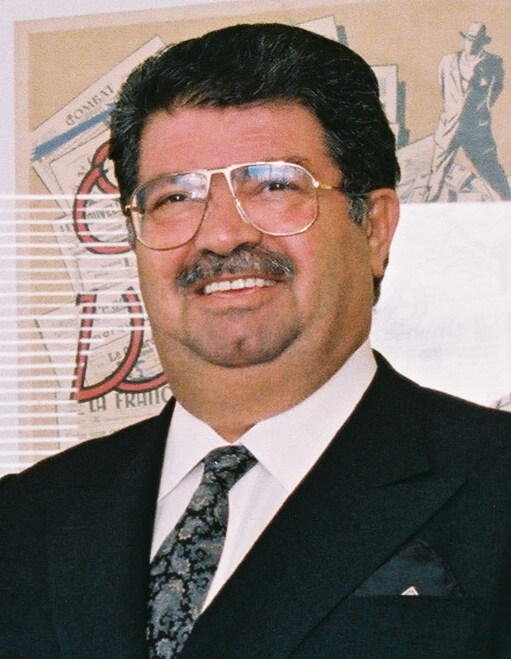
- Özal in 1989

8th President of Turkey
- In office 9 November 1989 – 17 April 1993
- Prime Minister: Yıldırım Akbulut; Mesut Yılmaz; Süleyman Demirel
- Preceded by: Kenan Evren
- Succeeded by: Süleyman Demirel; Hüsamettin Cindoruk (acting)

19th Prime Minister of Turkey
- In office 13 December 1983 – 31 October 1989
- President: Kenan Evren
- Deputy: Kaya Erdem; Ali Bozer
- Preceded by: Bülend Ulusu
- Succeeded by: Ali Bozer (acting)

Leader of the Motherland Party
- In office 20 May 1983 – 31 October 1989
- Preceded by: Party established
- Succeeded by: Yıldırım Akbulut

Deputy Prime Minister of Turkey
- In office 20 September 1980 – 14 July 1982 Serving with Zeyyat Baykara
- Prime Minister: Bülend Ulusu
- Preceded by: Turhan Feyzioğlu
- Succeeded by: Kaya Erdem

Member of the Grand National Assembly
- In office 6 November 1983 – 9 November 1989
- Constituency: Istanbul (1983, 1987)

Undersecretary to the Prime Minister of Turkey
- In office 3 December 1979 – 22 September 1980
- Preceded by: Ahmet Durakoğlu
- Succeeded by: Necdet Calp

Personal details
- Born: 13 October 1927 Malatya, Turkey
- Died: 17 April 1993 (aged 65) Ankara, Turkey
- Resting place: Turgut Özal Memorial Tomb
- Party: Motherland Party; National Salvation Party
- Spouses: Ayhan İnal (m. 1952; div. 1952) Semra Yeğinmen (m. 1954)
- Children: Ahmet Özal; Zeynep Özal; Efe Özal
- Relatives: Özal family
- Education: Istanbul Technical University

Halil Turgut Özal (Note: Turkish: [haˈlil tuɾˈɡut øˈzaɫ]) (13 October 1927 – 17 April 1993) was a Turkish politician, bureaucrat, engineer and statesman who served as the president of Turkey from 1989 to 1993. He previously served as the prime minister of Turkey from 1983 to 1989 as the leader of the Motherland Party. He was the deputy prime minister of Turkey in the military government of Bülend Ulusu between 1980 and 1982.

After working briefly at the World Bank in the United States and as a university lecturer, Özal became the general secretary and later the leader of the main miners' trade union of Turkey in 1979, serving as a chief negotiator during large-scale industrial action in 1977. He unsuccessfully stood for Parliament in the 1977 general election as a National Salvation Party (MSP) candidate from İzmir. In 1979, he became an undersecretary to Prime Minister Süleyman Demirel's minority government until the 1980 military coup. As an undersecretary, he played a major role in developing economic reforms, known as the 24 January decisions, which paved the way for greater neoliberalism in the Turkish economy. After the coup, he was appointed Deputy Prime Minister of Turkey responsible for the economy in Bülend Ulusu's government and continued to implement economic reforms. He resigned in 1982 following disagreements over economic policy.

Özal formed the Motherland Party (ANAP) in 1983 after the ban on political parties was lifted by the military government. ANAP won a parliamentary majority in the 1983 general election and Özal subsequently became the prime minister of Turkey. While implementing several economic reforms concerning the exchange rate and deregulation, a rise in inflation and the growing conflict with Kurdish separatists led to ANAP winning reduced pluralities in the 1984 local elections. Despite a referendum in 1987 allowing politicians banned during the 1980 coup to resume political activities, ANAP was re-elected with a parliamentary majority in the 1987 general election, albeit with a reduced share of the vote. He survived an assassination attempt during a party congress in 1988. Özal's foreign policy focused on averting war with Greece following the Şimşek Incident and temporarily allowed Bulgarian Turks to emigrate to Turkey.

Özal was elected President of the Turkish Republic in the 1989 presidential election, while Yıldırım Akbulut replaced him as Prime Minister. Despite assuming a ceremonial role with minimal political duties, Özal remained occupied with government activities, such as intervening in the 1990 Zonguldak miners' strikes. While Akbulut took a docile approach as Prime Minister, disputes over the President's and Prime Minister's duties were dominant when Süleyman Demirel became Prime Minister after the 1991 general election. The Southeastern Anatolia development project began with the construction of the Atatürk Dam in Şanlıurfa, while Özal participated in the first ever summit of Turkic Republics in 1992 held in Ankara. He maintained close relations with the president of the United States George H. W. Bush during the Gulf War and the end of the Cold War. Özal died unexpectedly while in office in 1993, with an exhumation in 2012 leading to evidence of poisoning but the cause of death was unclear.

== Early life and career ==
Halil Turgut Özal was born in Malatya, the eldest of three sons. His father was Mehmet Sıddık Özal, a bank clerk. His mother, Hafize Özal, was originally from Çemişgezek, Tunceli and of either half or full Kurdish descent.

His parents have been described as "devout Muslims", his father having trained as an imam before becoming a branch manager at the state-owned Agricultural Bank while his mother was an elementary school teacher associated with the community of İskenderpaşa, affiliated with the Naqshbandi Sufi order, and Turgut Özal himself would get involved with the group later on.

He completed elementary school in Silifke, middle school in Mardin, and high school in Kayseri. Özal studied electrical engineering at Istanbul Technical University, graduating in 1950.

Between 1950 and 1952, he worked at the State Electrical Power Planning Administration and continued his studies in the United States on electrical energy and engineering management between 1952 and 1953. After his return to Turkey, he worked in the same organization again on electrification projects until 1958. Özal was in the State Planning Organization in 1959, and in the Planning Coordination Department in 1960. After his military service in 1961, he worked at several state organizations in leading positions and lectured at ODTÜ (Middle East Technical University). The World Bank employed him between 1971 and 1973. Then, he was chairman of some private Turkish companies until 1979. Back to the state service, he was undersecretary to Turkish Prime Minister Süleyman Demirel until the military coup on 12 September 1980.

== Political career ==
The military junta under Kenan Evren appointed him state minister and deputy prime minister in charge of economic affairs until July 1982.

=== Prime Ministership (1983–1989) ===
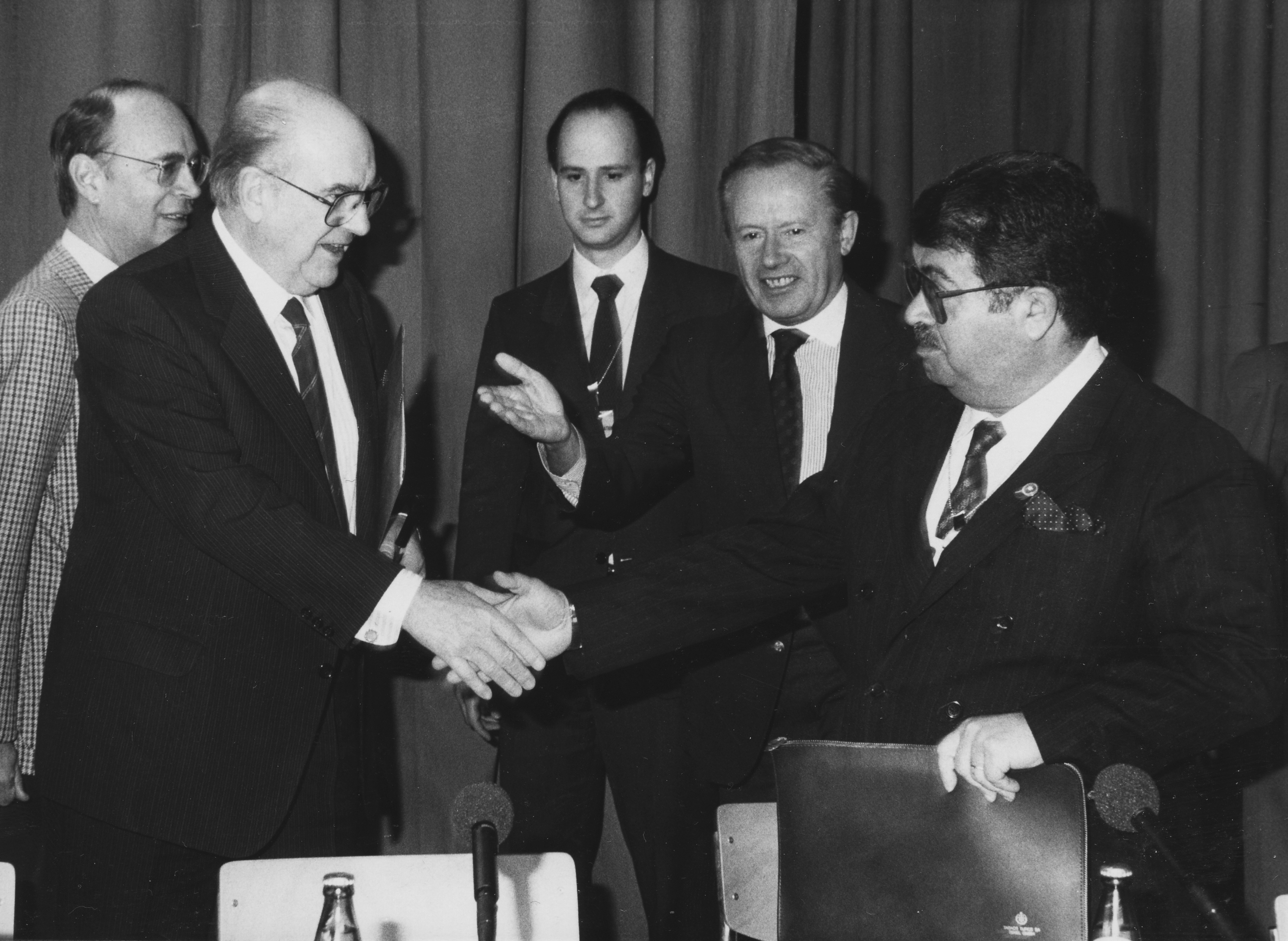
Andreas Papandreou and Turgut Özal in Davos, 1986

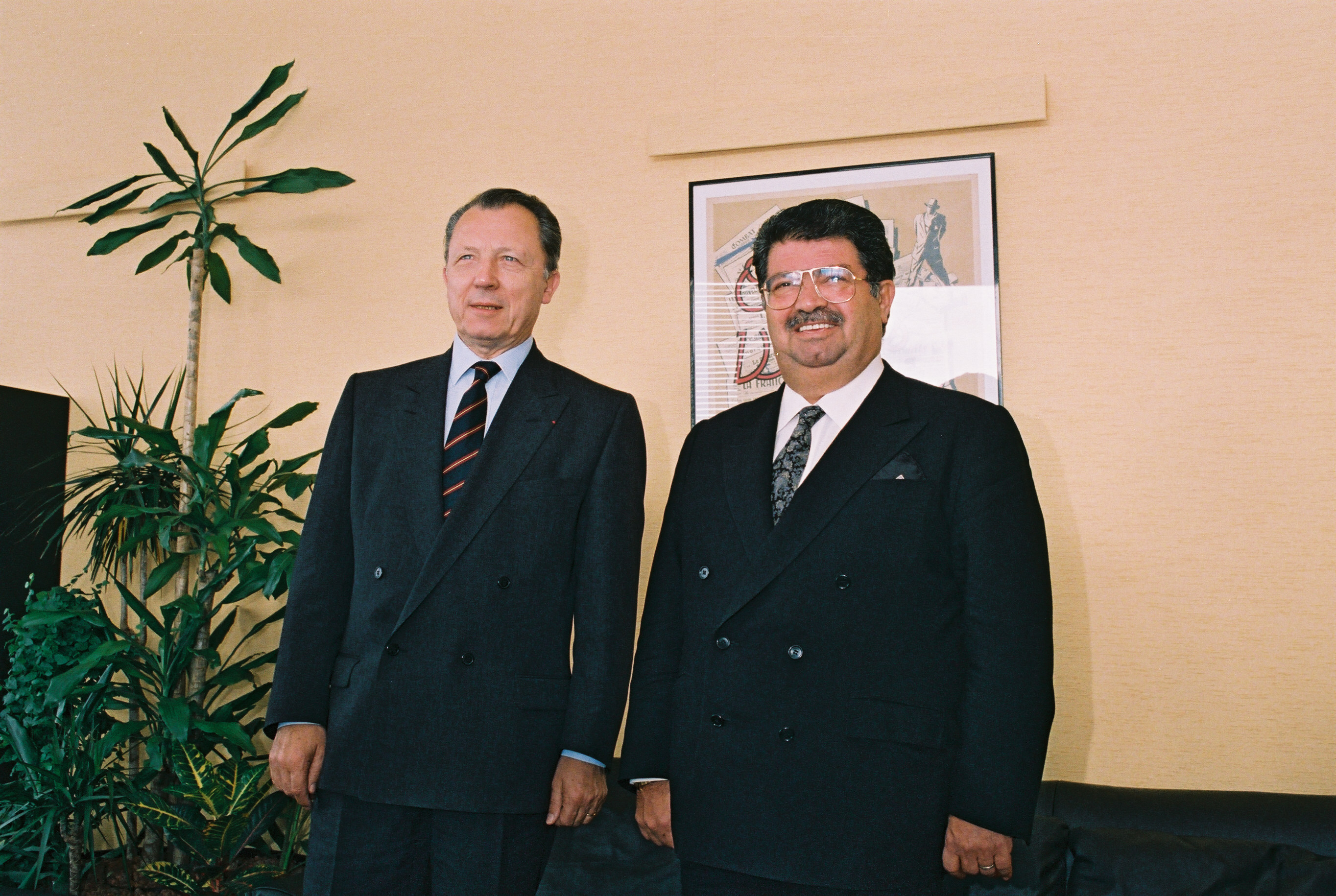
Özal with European Commission President Jacques Delors, 23 May 1989

In the parliamentary elections of 1977 he became a candidate for the National Salvation Party (MSP) on the insistence of his brother, but did not succeed. On 20 May 1983 he founded the Motherland Party (Turkish: Anavatan Partisi) and became its leader. His party won the elections and he formed the government to become the 19th Prime minister on 13 December 1983. In 1987 he again became prime minister after winning elections. During his tenure as a prime minister he was involved in shaping the foreign economic relations of Turkey and with his support the Foreign Economic Relations Board of Turkey (DEİK) was established in 1986. He also began to take delegations of business leaders on his foreign trips.

He became the head of the transformation of the social and economic outlook of Turkey which was led by the Motherland Party due to the wider global trend of neoliberal transformation with anti-labor-union discourses.

=== Assassination attempt ===
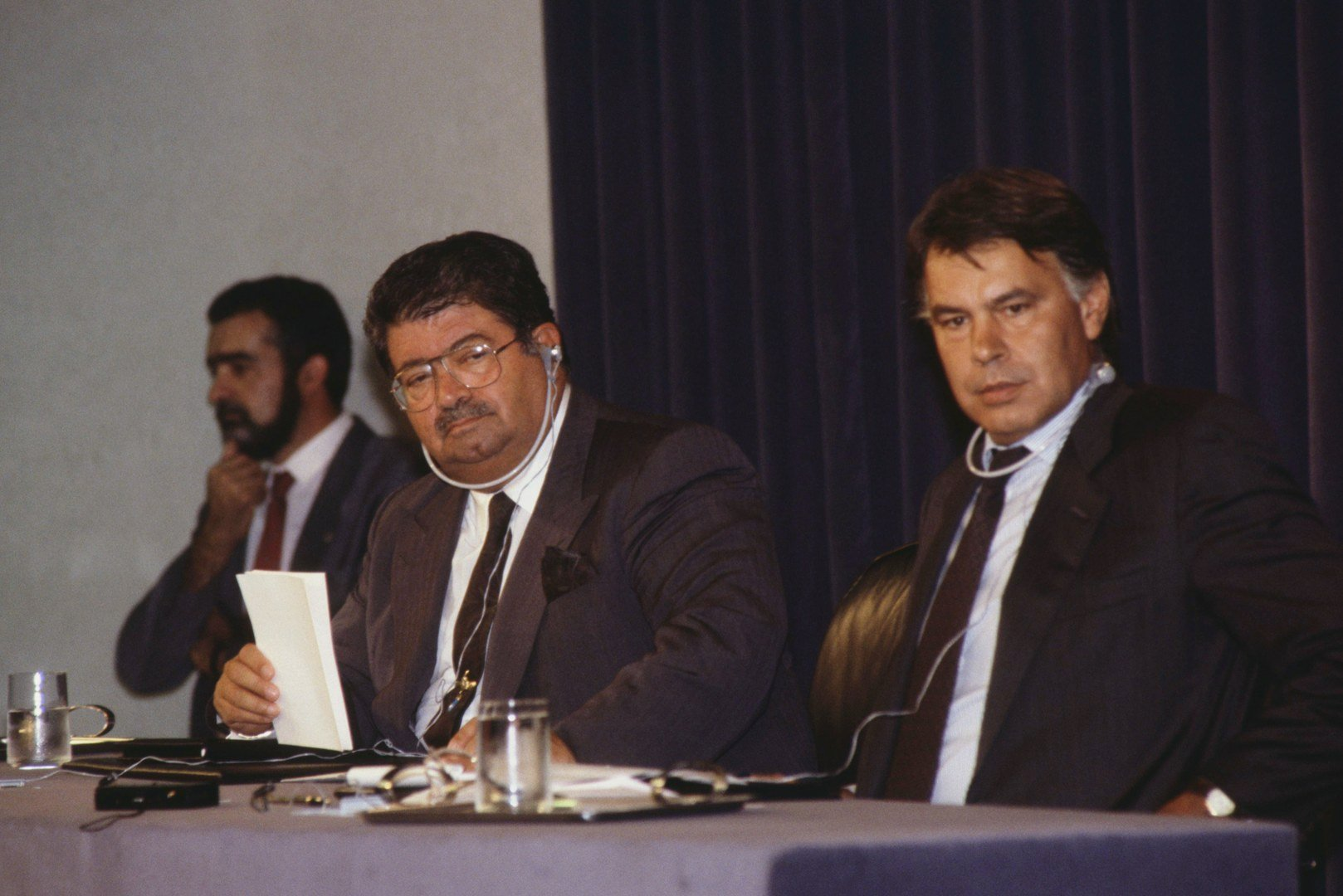
Turgut Özal and Felipe González at Moncloa Palace, September 1989

On 18 June 1988 he survived an assassination attempt during the party congress. One bullet wounded his finger while another bullet missed his head. The assassin, Kartal Demirağ, was captured and sentenced to life imprisonment but pardoned by Özal in 1992. Demirağ was allegedly a Counter-Guerrilla, contracted by the movement's hawkish leader, General Sabri Yirmibeşoğlu. Two months later, Yirmibeşoğlu became the Secretary-General of the National Security Council. During Yirmibeşoğlu's tenure as secretary general, Özal heard about the allegations of Yirmibeşoğlu's role in the affair and forced him into retirement. In late 2008, Demirağ was re-tried by the Ankara 11th Heavy Penal Court and sentenced to twenty years in prison. In 2013 Özal's son Ahmet Özal said that several months before the assassination attempt Özal had survived a plane incident in which his official plane lost an engine and crash-landed. The manufacturer later reported a 95% probability that the plane would have exploded under the circumstances present.

=== Presidency (1989–1993) ===
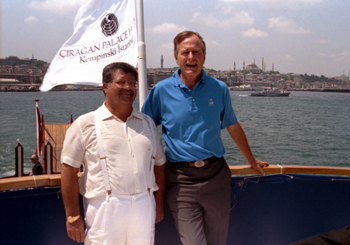
Turgut Özal and George H. W. Bush in Istanbul, July 1991

On 9 November 1989, Özal became the eighth President of Turkey elected by the Grand National Assembly of Turkey and the first president to be born in the Republic of Turkey rather than the Ottoman Empire.

With the dissolution of the Soviet Union, Özal made an effort to found alliances with the Turkic countries of Central Asia as well as Azerbaijan in the South Caucasus. He was also a keen proponent of the country's rapprochement with the Middle East and the Muslim countries. Ozal was very supportive of the Gulf War, urging President George H. W. Bush to go to war with Iraq, with which Turkey shared a border. He said that Saddam Hussein "must go" and called him "more dangerous than Gaddafi."

Özal's free market instinct perhaps defined some of his greatest achievements - the opening up of the Turkish economy. At a stroke, capital controls were abolished - Turks could take out or bring in whatever declared foreign currency they wished. He also liberalized the foreign exchange regime and embarked on one of the most aggressive and ambitious export-driven policies anywhere in post-war history.

The watchword of this campaign was "Export-or-Die". Turkish contractors such as Kutlutaş, Enka, STFA and Tekfen, to name but a few, alone amassed $20 billion worth of contracts in the Gulf Cooperation Council (GCC) and Libyan markets in the 1980–1990 decade.

President Turgut Özal agreed to negotiations with the Kurdistan Workers' Party (PKK). Apart from Özal, himself half-Kurdish, few Turkish politicians were interested, nor was more than a part of the PKK itself. A first round occurred in the early 90s, and led to a cease-fire declaration by the PKK on 17 March 1993. After the president's death on 17 April 1993, in suspicious circumstances, the hope of reconciliation evaporated, and the Castle Plan, which Özal had opposed, was enacted. Some journalists and politicians maintain that Özal's death was part of a covert military coup in 1993 aimed at stopping the peace plans.

Özal had a firm vision of a Turkey straddling as a bridge between Asia and Europe – a modern and scientific Turkey. He strongly believed that Islam is compatible with democracy and accountability, and that a Muslim country can also be modern, scientific and progressive.

== Controversies ==
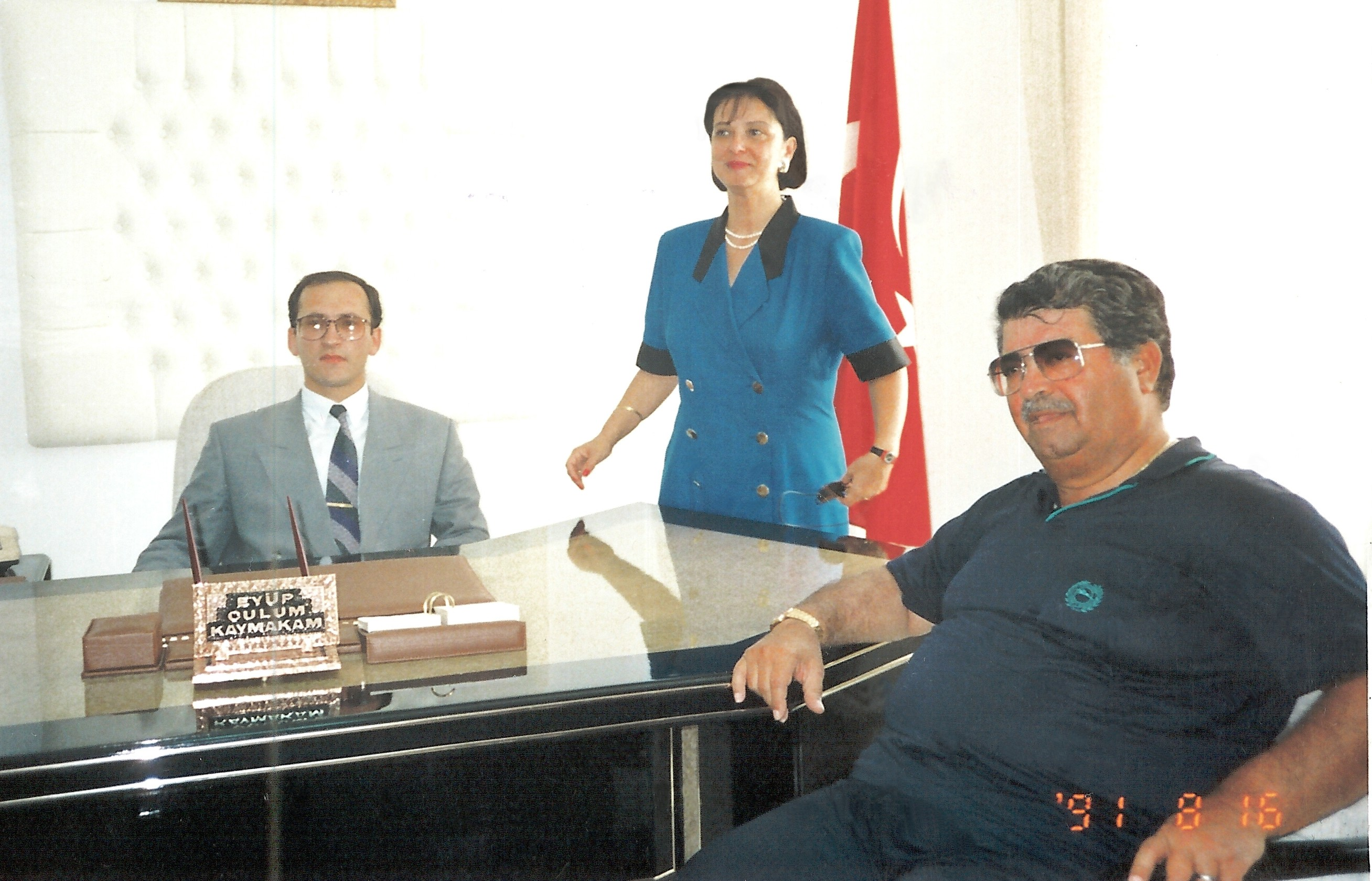
The ceremony marking of the beginning of governance for the first Kaymakam Eyüp Sabri Kartal in Kavaklıdere, with President Turgut Özal and Vali Lale Aytaman, August 1991

=== Views on the Armenian genocide ===
The issue of the Armenian genocide was part of Özal's agenda because he came to believe that Turkey's ongoing denial policy harmed his country's international relations. He wanted to reach an agreement with the Armenians and solve the problem as soon as possible by making compromises. The reason for this was his first confrontation with the topic of the genocide in the 1950s while he was still studying in the United States. Özal noticed an emerging Armenian lobby which aimed to introduce the recognition of the Armenian Genocide on the political agenda in the United States.

When he became prime minister in 1983, the Armenian issue was one of the topics on his agenda. However, he faced tough challenges as the Armenian Secret Army for the Liberation of Armenia (ASALA) intensified its attacks on Turkish diplomats abroad in the early 1980s. The ASALA factor made it very difficult to take any bold steps in domestic politics with respect to bridging the gap between Turks and Armenians. Behind closed doors, Özal defended the idea of holding negotiations with Armenians to settle a dispute that has had great potential to deal a serious blow to Turkish interests in international politics.

In 1984, Özal tasked his advisers to work out different scenarios of the political and economic costs that Turkey would have to incur if it would agree to compromise with the Armenian diaspora and recognize the Genocide. In 1991, after a meeting with representatives of the Armenian community, Özal said in front of journalists and diplomats:

What happens if we compromise with the Armenians and end this issue? What if we officially recognize the 1915 Armenian genocide and face up to our past? Let's take the initiative and find the truth. Let's pay the political and economic price, if necessary.

Özal tried to implement several projects, including the "Van project", as part of his solution to the Genocide issue. The Van Project envisioned the return of some lands to Armenians in Van. However, Özal was unable to make concrete progress because his policies sparked criticism and fury among the Turkish public, the Motherland Party, and the Turkish military as they considered the idea of negotiating with the Armenian diaspora itself as unacceptable and unthinkable. After Özal's death, his policies of compromising with the Armenians in order to solve the conflict concerning the Armenian genocide were abandoned.

== Death and exhumation ==
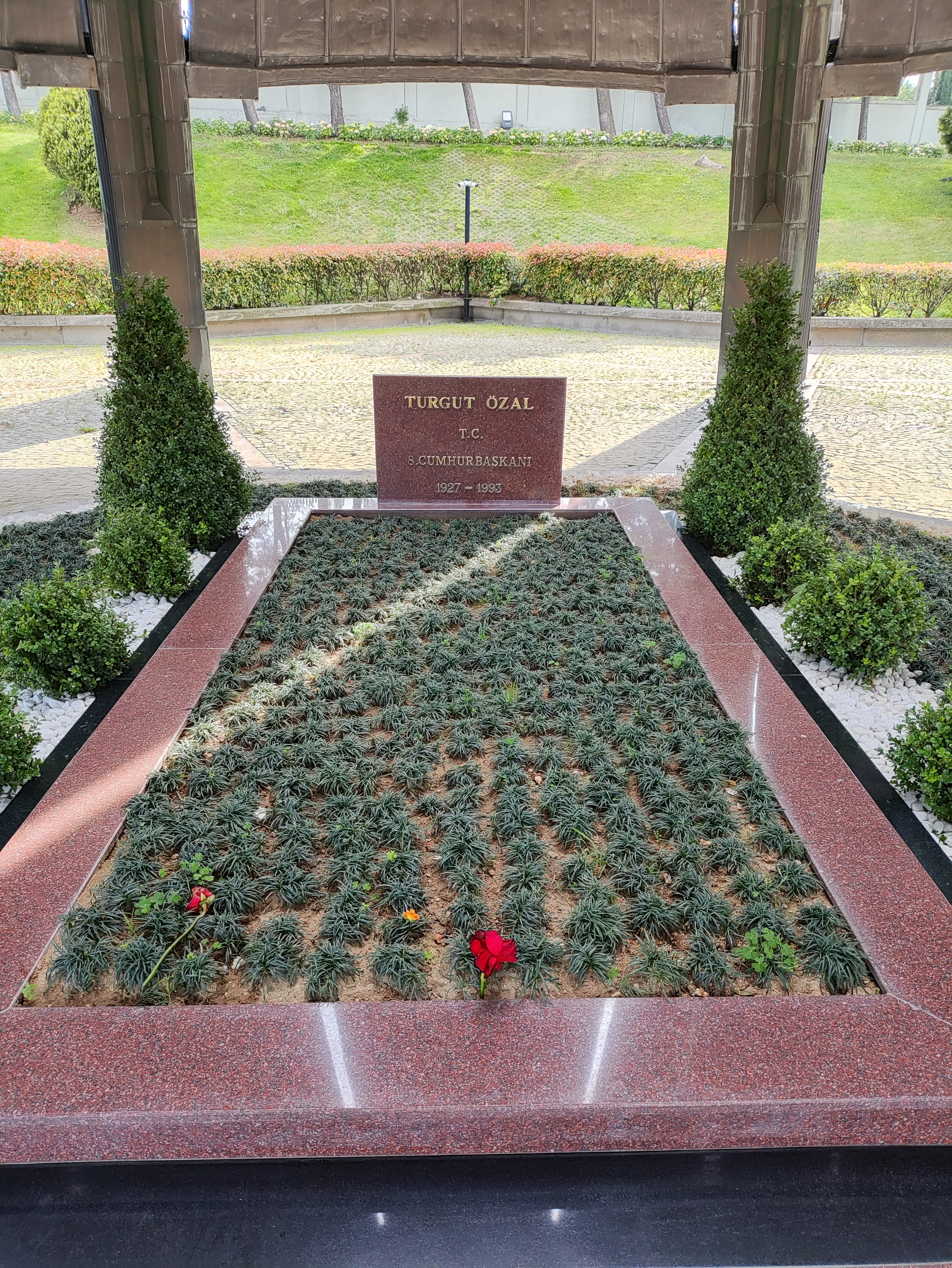
Özal's grave in his mausoleum

On 17 April 1993 Özal died of a suspicious heart attack while still in office, leading some to suspect an assassination. Özal had first become ill a month earlier.

He died just before he had the chance to negotiate with the Kurdish rebel organization, the PKK. His wife Semra Özal claimed he had been poisoned by lemonade and she questioned the lack of an autopsy. The blood samples taken to determine cause of death were lost or disposed of. Özal had sought to create a Turkic union, and had obtained the commitment of several presidents of the newly independent Turkic states from the former Soviet Union. His wife Semra alleged that the perpetrator might have wanted to foil the plan.

Hundreds of thousands of people attended the state burial ceremony in Istanbul, in which Özal was buried next to the mausoleum of Adnan Menderes. Among those attending were dignitaries of 72 countries, including several heads of state and government, such as Greek Prime Minister Konstantinos Mitsotakis, Armenian President Levon Ter-Petrosyan, German President Richard von Weizsäcker, and Azerbaijani President Abulfaz Elchibey attended the funeral, as well as former U.S. Secretary of State James Baker.

On the fourteenth anniversary of his death, thousands gathered in Ankara in commemoration. Investigators wanted to exhume the body to examine it for poisoning. In September 2012, a court ruled that the grave be opened for another autopsy. On 3 October 2012 his body was exhumed. It contained the banned insecticide DDT at ten times the normal level. According to press reports, the "partially embalmed" remains were found to be well preserved, much to the experts' and public's surprise. It is reported that while the lower half of the body was subject to skeletonization, the upper half was preserved due to adipocere.

An autopsy report issued on 12 December 2012 stated his body contained poison but the cause of death was unclear. A trial charging retired general Levent Ersöz with his murder began in September 2013 who eventually was cleared of all charges.

== Legacy ==
Numerous streets, parks, and public buildings in Turkey are named after Özal.

== Family and personal life ==
With his wife Semra, Özal had two sons: Ahmet and Efe, and a daughter: Zeynep. Ahmet Özal, was elected to parliament after the elections of 1999, but stayed out after the elections of 2002.

Turgut was a member of a powerful Islamic order in Turkey, Community of İskenderpaşa, which is a Turkish branch of the Naqshbandi tariqah.

== Electoral history ==
=== Parliamentary ===
Election date	Votes	Percentage of votes	Seats won	Political party	Map
1983	7,833,148	45.14%	211 / 400	Motherland Party	
1987	8,704,335	36.31%	292 / 450	Motherland Party	

=== Local ===
Election date	Votes	Percentage of votes	Political party	Map
1984	7,355,796	41.52%	Motherland Party	
1989	4,828,164	21.80%	Motherland Party	

== See also ==
- Özalism

Party political offices
New political party	Leader of the Motherland Party; 1983–1989	Succeeded by Yıldırım Akbulut
Political offices
Preceded by Orhan Eyüpoğlu	Deputy Prime Minister of Turkey; 1980–1982	Succeeded by Kaya Erdem
Preceded by Hikmet Çetin	Deputy Prime Minister of Turkey; 1980–1982	Succeeded by Kaya Erdem
Preceded by Bülend Ulusu	Prime Minister of Turkey; 1983–1989	Succeeded by Yıldırım Akbulut
Preceded by Kenan Evren	President of Turkey; 1989–1993	Succeeded by Hüsamettin Cindoruk; Acting
