= Platanovrysi =

Platanovrysi (Greek: Πλατανόβρυση) may refer to several places in Greece:

- Platanovrysi, Achaea, a village in the municipality of Erymanthos, Achaea
- Platanovrysi, Drama, a village in the municipality of Paranesti, Drama regional unit
- Platanovrysi, Messenia, a village in the municipality of Messini, Messenia
