= Greek National Road 13 =

Trunk road in Greece

Coordinates: 40.1340°N 22.2188°E

National Road 13
- Εθνική Οδός 13
- Route of the EO13 road, in blue

Route information
- Length: 61.9 km (38.5 mi)
- Existed: 9 July 1963–present

Major junctions
- North end: Katerini
- South end: Elassona

Location
- Country: Greece
- Regions: Central Macedonia; Thessaly
- Primary destinations: Katerini; Agios Dimitrios; Elassona

Highway system
- Highways in Greece; Motorways; National roads
← EO12	→ EO14

Greek National Road 13 (Greek: Εθνική Οδός 13), abbreviated as the EO13, is a national road in northern Greece. It connects Katerini with the Greek National Road 3 at Mikro Eleftherochori, about 8.06 kilometres (5.01 miles) north of Elassona.

== Route ==
The EO13 is officially defined as a north–south road in the Larissa and Pieria regional units: it runs between Katerini to the north and Mikro Eleftherochori (near Elassona) to the south, passing through Agios Dimitrios. The EO13 connects with the EO1 in Katerini, which leads to the A1 motorway, and the EO3 (also part of the E65) in Mikro Eleftherochori.

== History ==
Ministerial Decision G25871 of 9 July 1963 created the EO13 from the old EO80, which existed by royal decree from 1955 until 1963, and followed the same route as the current EO13.
