= The Turkish Einstein, Oktay Sinanoglu =

Book by Emine Çaykara

- Author: Oktay Sinanoğlu
- Language: Turkish
- Genre: Autobiography
- ISBN: 978-9754582949

The Turkish Einstein Oktay Sinanoglu (Turkish: Türk Aynştaynı Oktay Sinanoğlu Kitabı) is a book in which Scientist Oktay Sinanoğlu tells the story of his life and works. Interviewee Sinanoglu replies to

the questions of interviewer Emine Çaykara. Sinanoglu details his journey from Ankara, Turkey, to the United States when he was sixteen, to attend the University of California - Berkeley, and to subsequently earn Masters and Doctoral degrees from MIT and Berkeley, before becoming one of the youngest full professors in Yale University's history, where Sinanoglu remained on the faculty for over forty years. The book was first published in 2001 and 58,000 copies were sold out in record time. Only the pirated publication of a further 150,000 copies was able to satisfy demand.
