= Saadet =

"Saadet" is a Turkish feminine given name, meaning "Felicity." People with this name include:

== Given name ==
- Saadet Aksoy (born 1983), Turkish-born actress
- Saadet I Giray (1492–1538), Khan of the Crimean Khanate
- Saadet II Giray (?–1587), Khan of the Crimean Khanate
- Saadet İkesus Altan (1916–2007), Turkish opera singer, vocal coach and opera director
- Saadet Özkan (born 1978), Turkish activist against child abuse
- Saadet Yüksel (born 1983), Turkish judge at the European Court of Human Rights

== Other uses ==
- Felicity Party (Turkish: Saadet Partisi), an Islamist Turkish political party
