= Oktay Sinanoğlu =

Turkish chemist (1935–2015)

- Born: February 25, 1935; Bari, Italy
- Died: April 19, 2015 (aged 80); Miami, Florida, United States
- Resting place: Karacaahmet Cemetery, Istanbul, Turkey
- Education: TED Ankara College
- Alma mater: UC Berkeley (BS, PhD); MIT (MS)
- Awards: Humboldt Prize (1973)
- Scientific career
- Fields: Physical chemistry and molecular biophysics
- Institutions: Yale University; Middle East Technical University; Yıldız Technical University
- Thesis: Intermolecular Forces and Statistical Mechanics (1959)
- Doctoral advisor: Kenneth Pitzer
- Doctoral students: Ariel Fernandez

Oktay Sinanoğlu (February 25, 1935 – April 19, 2015) was a Turkish physical chemist and molecular biophysicist who made contributions to the theory of electron correlation in molecules, the statistical mechanics of clathrate hydrates, quantum chemistry, and the theory of solvation.

== Early life and education ==
Sinanoğlu was born in Bari, Italy on February 25, 1935. His parents were Rüveyde (Karacabey) Sinanoğlu and Nüzhet Haşim. His father Rüveyde was a writer, and a consular official in the Bari consulate of Turkey. Following his father's recall to Turkey in July 1938, the family returned to Turkey before the start of World War II. He had a sister, Esin Afşar (1936-2011), who became a well-known singer and actress.

Sinanoğlu graduated from TED Ankara Koleji in 1951. He went to the United States in 1953, where he studied in University of California, Berkeley graduating with a BSc degree in 1956. The following year, he completed an MSc degree at MIT (1957), and was awarded a Sloan Research Fellowship. He completed a predoctoral fellowship (1958-1959) and earned his PhD in physical chemistry (1959-1960) at the University of California, Berkeley, advised by Kenneth Pitzer.

== Academic career ==
In 1960, Sinanoğlu joined the chemistry department at Yale University. He was appointed full professor of chemistry in 1963. At age 28, he became the youngest full professor in Yale’s 20th-century history. It has been claimed that he was also the third-youngest full professor in the 300-plus year history of Yale University.

During his tenure at Yale he wrote a number of papers in various subfields of theoretical chemistry, the most widely cited of which was his 1961 paper on electron correlation. This work anticipated the widely used coupled cluster method for describing electrons in molecules with greater accuracy than is possible via the Hartree-Fock method. He also published notable papers on the statistical mechanics of clathrate hydrates, solvation, and surface tension. His final projects were focused on the development of his valency interaction formula (VIF) theory, a method for predicting energy level patterns for compounds from the manipulation of graphs. He intended for chemists to be able to use the VIF method to predict the ways in which complex chemical reactions would proceed, using only a chalkboard or pencil and paper; however, he apparently never presented it at conferences and it was not widely adopted by other chemists. He continued to develop the VIF method, which he sometimes referred to as "Sinanoğlu Made Simple," and other problems related to graph theory and quantum mechanics for the rest of his career. After 37 years on the Yale faculty, Sinanoğlu retired in 1997.

During his time at Yale, Sinanoğlu served as a consultant to Turkish universities, the Scientific and Technological Research Council of Turkey (TÜBİTAK), and the Japan Society for the Promotion of Science (JSPS). In 1962, the Board of Trustees of Middle East Technical University in Ankara granted him the title of "consulting professor."

After his retirement from Yale, Sinanoğlu was appointed to the chemistry department of Yıldız Technical University in Istanbul, serving until 2002.

Sinanoğlu was the author or co-author of over 200 scientific articles and books. He also authored books on contemporary affairs in Turkey and Turkish language, such as "Target Turkey" and "Bye Bye Turkish" (2005). In "Bye Bye Turkish", he propounded the idea of cognation between Turkish and Japanese based on the alleged similarity of a number of words.

A 2001 best-seller book about his life and works, edited by Turkish writer Emine Çaykara, referred to him as "The Turkish Einstein, Oktay Sinanoğlu" (Turkish: Türk Aynştaynı Oktay Sinanoğlu Kitabı).

== Honors ==
He received the "TÜBİTAK Science Award" for chemistry in 1966, the Alexander von Humboldt Research Award in chemistry in 1973, and the "International Outstanding Scientist Award of Japan" in 1975. It has been reported in Turkish media that Sinanoğlu was a two-time nominee for the Nobel Prize in Chemistry, but this claim is not supported by actual data from the Nobel Foundation.

== Personal life and death ==
On December 21, 1963, Oktay Sinanoğlu married Paula Armbruster, who was doing graduate work at Yale University. The wedding ceremony took place in the Branford College Chapel of Yale. They had three children. After their later divorce, he married Dilek Sinanoğlu and from this marriage he became the father of twins. The family resided in the Emerald Lakes neighborhood of Fort Lauderdale, Florida, and in Istanbul, Turkey.

Dilek Sinanoğlu made public on April 10, 2015, that Oktay Sinanoğlu was hospitalized in Miami, Florida, and was in a coma in the intensive care unit. He died at age 80 on April 19, 2015. No medical statement was released about the cause of the death. His body was transferred to Turkey, where he was buried in Karacaahmet Cemetery, Üsküdar following the religious funeral service at Şakirin Mosque.
