= Hüner Coşkuner =

Turkish singer (1963–2021)

- Born: 1 April 1963; Istanbul, Turkey
- Died: 4 February 2021 (aged 57); Istanbul, Turkey
- Resting place: Karacaahmet Cemetery
- Occupation: Singer
- Musical career
- Genres: Classical Turkish
- Years active: 1987–2021
- Labels: Şahinler, Çaçan, Elenor, DMC, Arpej Müzik
- Website: www.hunercoskuner.com

Hüner Coşkuner (1 April 1963 – 4 February 2021) was a Turkish singer active between 1987 and 2021. Her family roots are from the Western Black Sea region, and she is originally from Cide,Kastamonu.

Coşkuner died in Istanbul on 4 February 2021, aged 57, after a 10-month battle with bone marrow cancer. On 8 February, her funeral prayers were held at Şakirin Mosque and she was buried at Karacaahmet Cemetery.

== Discography ==
=== Albums ===
- Doğuş (1987) Birth / Genesis
- Sakın Dönme Geriye (1989) Never Turn Back
- Beni Sevmeni İstiyorum (1990)I Want You to Love Me
- Gidemezsin (1991) You Can't Go
- Haydi Tut Ellerimi (1992) Come On, Hold My Hands
- Gidiyor (1993) He Is Going
- Olamaz (1994) It Cannot be/Impossible
- Bir Evcilik Oyunu (1995) A Marriage Game
- Bir Hüner Coşkuner Klasiği (1996)- A Hüner Coşkuner Classic
- Beni Tek Sen Anlarsın (1997) Only You Understand Me
- Ben Ölürüm (1998) I Would Die
- İşte Düet Sevemem (with Erol Büyükburç) (1999)Here's the Duet: I Can't Love
- Klasikler 2 (2000) Classic 2
- Vurgunum Sana (2002)I'm Devoted to You / I'm Struck by You
- Geleceksen Gelme Yar (2005)If You're Coming, Don't Come, My Love
- Nerede (2007) Where Is It?
- Klasikler 3 (2009) Classics 3
- Güle Güle Git (2011) Go Safely / Go With a Smile (a farewell phrase)
- Yeşilçam Klasikleri (2013)
- Seni Acele Görmem Lazım (2015) I Need to See You Urgently
