= Sait Maden =

Turkish translator, poet, painter and graphic designer

- Born: 3 May 1931; Çorum, Turkey
- Died: 19 June 2013 (aged 82); Istanbul, Turkey
- Resting place: Karacaahmet Cemetery
- Education: Istanbul State Academy of Fine Arts
- Occupations: Translator; poet; painter; graphic designer
- Known for: Poem translations, poems, logos, book covers, posters, typefaces
- Website: https://saitmadenwebsite.pages.dev/

Sait Maden (3 May 1931 – 19 June 2013) was a Turkish translator, poet, painter and graphic designer.

He died on 19 June 2013 in Istanbul due to pneumonia after bypass surgery. His funeral was held at Şakirin Mosque and buried in Karacaahmet Cemetery on 21 June 2013.
