= Esin Afşar =

Turkish singer (1936–2011)

- Born: Esin Sinanoğlu; January 1, 1936; Bari, Italy
- Origin: Turkish
- Died: November 14, 2011 (aged 75) Istanbul, Turkey
- Genres: Anatolian rock, türkü, opera
- Occupations: Singer-songwriter, actress, artist, writer
- Years active: 1970–2002

Esin Afşar (née Sinanoğlu; 1 January 1936 – 14 November 2011) was a Turkish singer and stage actress.

== Personal life ==
She was born in Bari, Italy to Necat Haşim Sinanoğlu, a writer and consular official of Turkey and his wife Rüveyde, a journalist and writer. Esin was the youngest of five siblings. One of her brothers, Oktay Sinanoğlu, became a notable professor of chemistry. Other brothers became professor of Latin, professor of ancient Greek, and press chief at the European Council in Strasbourg.

She attended TED Ankara Koleji, and then studied piano at the Ankara State Conservatory. After graduation, she entered Turkish State Opera and Ballet as a pianist. But then her focus shifted to the stage. In 1958 she married Kerim Afşar, another stage artist. After 12 years of stage she returned to music and began singing in French and Italian. But after collaborating with Ruhi Su, she included Turkish folk music (türkü) to her repertoire. After she got a divorce from Kerim Afşar, she married Şener Aral in 1975. After the mid-1980s, she was mainly active in foreign tours. She also played parts in drama. In 1999, she was hospitalized and her recovery was slow.

Although she briefly returned to concerts and album recordings, Afşar died on 14 November 2011 in a hospital in Istanbul, where she was taken due to leukemia about three weeks earlier. She was laid to rest at the Karacaahmet Cemetery. She was survived by her husband Şener Aral, son Doğan Can and daughter Pınar.

== Career ==
Although her repertoire included a wide collection of various melodies of different tastes, her fame mainly stems from Turkish folklore. In 1969 two of her arranged folklore melodies became hits. These were Bana seni gerek (lyrics by Yunus Emre (1240–1321) and composition by Esin Afşar herself) and Yoh Yoh (by contemporary folklore poet Kul Ahmet). The melody on the reverse side of the Yoh Yoh 45 rpm was Bebek, a well-known anonymous Turkmen folklore melody. After the release of Yoh Yoh she was nicknamed "Bayan Yoh Yoh" ("Mrs. Yoh Yoh").

She was sent to Hungary by İhsan Sabri Çağlayangil, the minister of Foreign Affairs as an official representative of Turkish culture. In 1970, she gave a series of concerts in Italy. In 1972, she visited Soviet Union (especially those republics which would soon be called Turkic Republics) and South Korea. In 1973, she was in Israel, Great Britain, Belgium and Tunis and in 1974 in Australia. She also participated in the Turkish under contest to nominate a Turkish participant for the Eurovision Song Contest 1975. In 1980, in a live TV program, she sang a melody with lyrics from Nazım Hikmet and her melodies were banned by the military junta. In 1985, she gave a concert in Paris. In 1988, she appeared in concerts at Lausanne, Switzerland, and the next year, in 1989 at Mulhouse, France.

== Opposition to arabesque ==
Esin Afşar was strictly against a new style of music in Turkey that emerged after the 1970s, named arabesque. She protested arabesque by composing a melody "Arabeske İnat" ("In Spite of Arabesque").

== Discography ==
=== Albums ===
- Dün ve Bugünün Türk Şiir ve Ezgileri, 1986 (poems)
- Ruhi Su'ya Türkü, 1987
- Yunus Emre, 1991
- Esin Alaturka, 1995
- Atatürk, 1997
- Özlem, 1998
- Pembe Uçurtma, 1998
- Caz Yorumlarıyla Aşık Veysel, 1999
- Nazım Hikmet Şarkıları, 2000
- Yunus Emre & Mevlana Şarkıları, 2002
- Söz Çiğdem Talu, 2006
- Büyük Türk Şairi Nazım Hihmet, 2010
- Esin Afşar Odeon Yılları, 2010

=== 45 rpm singles ===
- Allam Allam Seni Yar / Yoh Yoh, 1970
- Niksarın Fidanları / Aliyi Gördüm Aliyi, 1970
- Gurbet Yorganı / Elif, 1970
- Halalay Çocuk / Güzelliğin On Para Etmez, 1970
- Allam Allam Seni Yar / Drama Köprüsü, 1970
- Yoh Yoh / Bebek (Bir Masal Türküsü), 1970
- Kara Toprak / Yunus (Bana Seni gerek Seni), 1970
- Yağan Yağmur / Çatladı Dudaklarım Öpülmeyi Öpülmeyi, 1971
- Diley Diley Yar / Yaprağı, 1971
- Sivastopol / Küçük Kuşum, 1971
- Gel Dosta Gidelim / Sorma, 1971
- Dert Şarkısı / Niye Çattın Kaşlarını, 1974
- Sandığımı Açamadım / Güneşe Giden Gemi, 1974
- Canı Sıkılan Adam / Yiğidin Öyküsü, 1975
- Sanatçının Kaderi / O Pencere, 1975
- Hacer Hanım / Ben Olayım, 1976
- Zühtü / Kaz, 1976
