= Natural History Museum (Paranesti) =

Natural history museum in Paranesti, Greece

- Μουσείο Φυσικής Ιστορίας
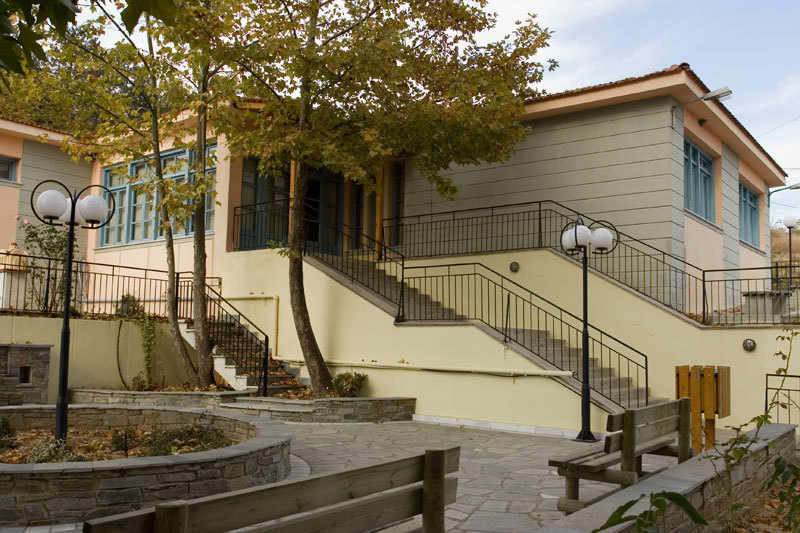
- Museum's external view
- Established: 1 October 2002
- Location: Paranesti
- Coordinates: 41.2684024°N 24.50112°E

The Natural History Museum is a museum in Paranesti, Greece, which has been operating since October 2002 and has an exhibition space exceeding 300 sq. m., in which the presentation of the exhibits is done in the most modern way, providing rich information about the geology, the rocks, the fossils and the wealth flora and fauna of Rhodope region and the valley of Nestos.

== Gallery ==
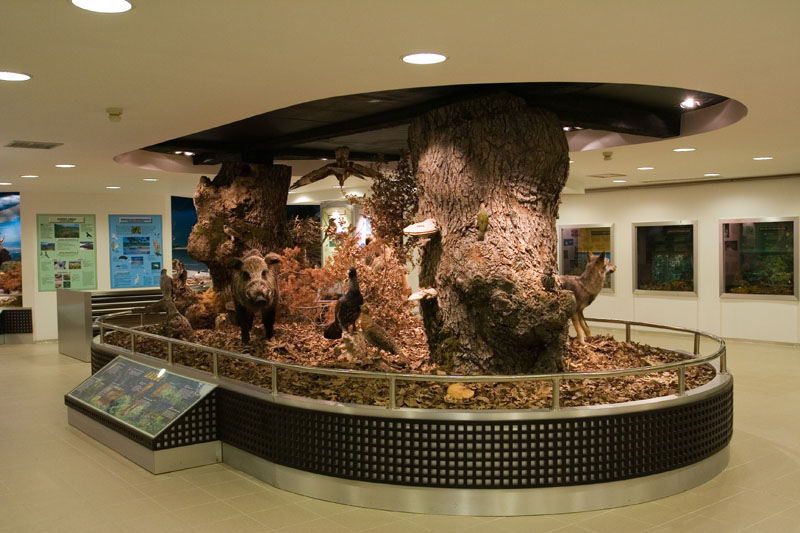
Interior view with samples of local flora

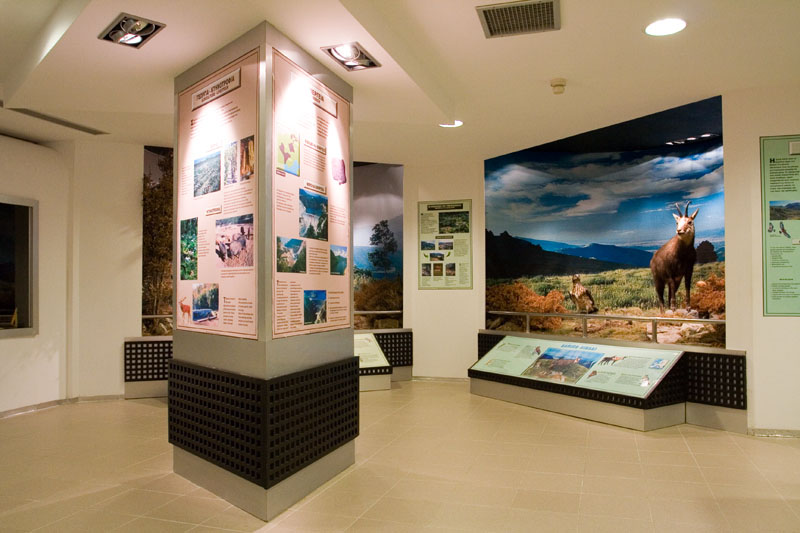
View of the interior with information about the local flora and fauna

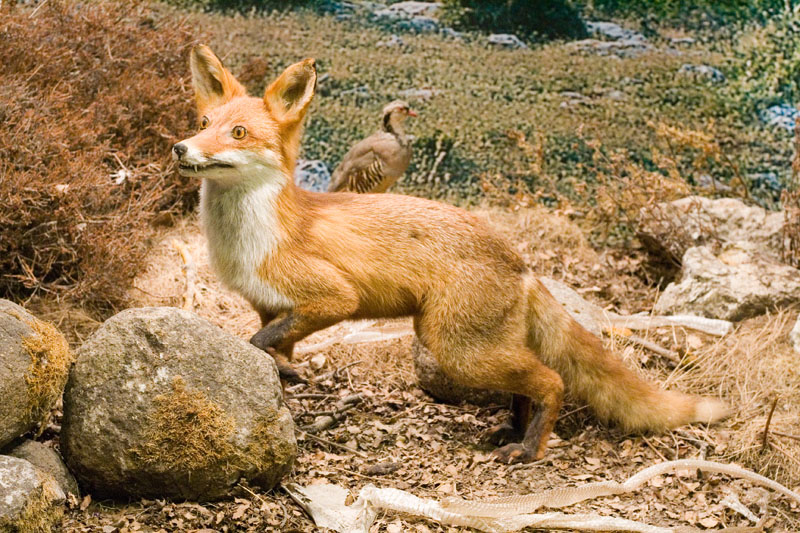
Fox

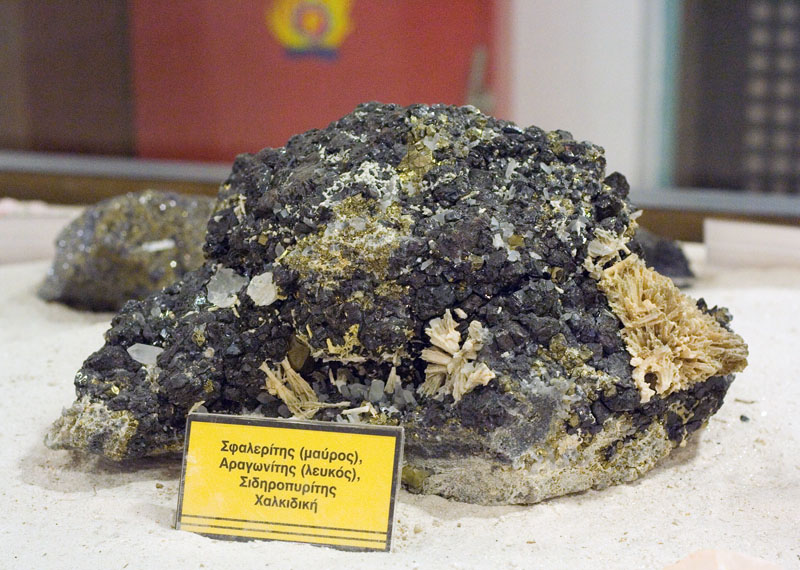
Samples of minerals (sphalerite, aragonite, pyrite) from Chalkidike
