= Ariel Fernandez =

Argentine biophysicist

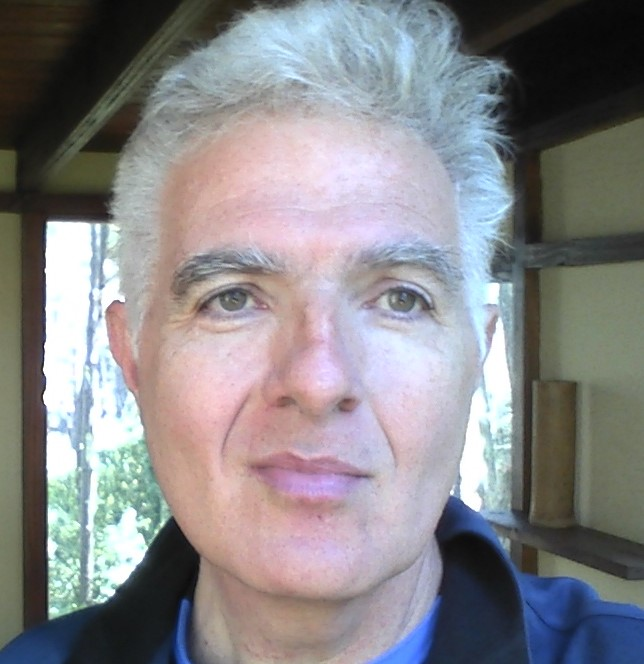
- Fernandez in 2016
- Born: April 8, 1957 (age 69); Bahía Blanca, Argentina
- Citizenship: Argentina; United States
- Education: Universidad Nacional del Sur; Yale University
- Known for: Dehydrons
- Scientific career
- Fields: Biophysics; Statistical mechanics; Drug design
- Workplaces: Rice University; University of Miami
- Thesis: Structural Stability of Chemical Systems at Critical Regimes (1984)
- Doctoral advisor: Oktay Sinanoğlu
- Website: www.profarielfernandez.com

Ariel Fernandez (born Ariel Fernández Stigliano, April 8, 1957) is an Argentinian–American physical chemist and pharmaceutical researcher.

In 2025, a judge determined that Fernandez had engaged in scientific misconduct, and in 2026 he was barred from receiving federal research funding in the US for 15 years. Fernandez denies the misconduct findings.

== Education ==
Fernandez received licentiate degrees in chemistry (1979) and mathematics (1980) from the Universidad Nacional del Sur, Argentina. He then earned a Ph.D. from Yale University in 1984 with a thesis entitled Structural Stability of Chemical Systems at Critical Regimes.

== Career ==
Fernandez held the Karl F. Hasselmann Professorship of Bioengineering at Rice University from 2006 until 2011 when he left as part of a settlement of a research misconduct investigation by the university.

Fernandez developed the concept of the dehydron, an adhesive structural defect in a soluble protein that promotes its own dehydration. The nonconserved nature of protein dehydrons has implications for drug discovery, as dehydrons may be targeted by highly specific drugs/ligands. This technology was applied by Fernandez and collaborators to design a new compound based on the anticancer drug Gleevec, in order to reduce its cardiotoxicity.

=== Misconduct findings ===
The editorial board of the Proceedings of the National Academy of Sciences retracted a January 2006 paper coauthored by Fernandez because it had "substantial overlap", without attribution, of figures and text from an article by Fernandez published in Structure the previous month, a form of duplicate publication. An expression of concern was issued in 2013 by the editors of BMC Genomics about a 2011 paper published there by Fernandez. In 2014, geneticist Michael Lynch asked the editors of Nature to remove his name from a 2011 paper he had coauthored with Fernandez, leading the editors there to also publish an expression of concern.

The United States Office of Research Integrity (ORI) opened an investigation in 2010 and determined in 2022 that Fernandez had falsified research findings "in 12 published papers, four unpublished manuscripts, one presentation, and three grant applications". ORI proposed a 15-year debarment sanction by the US Department of Health and Human Service. In May 2025, an administrative law judge reviewing that report found that Fernandez's "research misconduct squandered Rice and NIH funds", referring to $1.2 million in grant funding, and recommended upholding the proposed debarment. In May 2026, ORI formally debarred Fernandez for scientific misconduct, for a period of fifteen years, finding that he intentionally fabricated data.
