= Verda Ün =

Turkish pianist (1919–2011)

- Born: 22 November 1919
- Died: 15 February 2011 (aged 91) Milas, Muğla Province, Turkey
- Occupations: Classical pianist, music teacher
- Instrument: Piano
- Spouse: Ekrem Zeki Ün

,

Verda Ün

Verda Ün (22 November 1919 – 15 February 2011) was a Turkish female classical pianist and piano teacher.

== Career ==
Ün was the first Turkish concert pianist. Ün, one of Turkey's most renowned piano teachers, taught at the Istanbul Municipal Conservatory for a long time and trained many pianists. She had trained many distinguished pianists and music educators, such as Mehru Ensari, Pınar Yılancıoğlu, Ova Sünder, Gülsin Onay (born 1954), and Ahmet Say, father of Fazıl Say.

== Personal life ==
Ün was born at Moda, Kadıköy in Istanbul , then Ottoman Empire on 22 November 1919. She was married to composer Ekrem Zeki Ün (1910–1987), was the daughter-in-law of Osman Zeki Üngör (1880– 1958), an orchestra conductor and the composer of the Turkish national anthem.

She died at her home in Milas, Muğla Province, as a result of a brain hemorrhage on the morning of 15 February 2011. Her body was transferred to Istanbul, and she was buried on 19 February at Karacaahmet Cemetery following amemorial ceremony at the Istanbul University State Conservatory Concert Hall in Kadıköy and the religious service at Moda
