= Greek National Road 14 =

Trunk road in Greece

Coordinates: 41.2306°N 24.5987°E

National Road 14
- Εθνική Οδός 14
- Route of the EO14 road, in blue

Route information
- Length: 84.0 km (52.2 mi)
- Existed: 9 July 1963–present

Major junctions
- West end: Drama
- East end: Xanthi

Location
- Country: Greece
- Regions: Eastern Macedonia and Thrace
- Primary destinations: Drama; Paranesti; Stavroupoli; Xanthi

Highway system
- Highways in Greece; Motorways; National roads
← EO13	→ EO15

Greek National Road 14 (Greek: Εθνική Οδός 14), abbreviated as the EO14, is a national road in northeastern Greece. It connects Drama with Xanthi, passing through Paranesti and Stavroupoli.

== Route ==
The EO14 is officially defined as an east–west road in the Drama and Xanthi regional units: it runs between the EO12 in Choristi (east of Drama), and the EO2 in Xanthi, via Paranesti and Stavroupoli. The EO55 branches off the EO14 at Gorgona, north of Xanthi.

== History ==
Ministerial Decision G25871 of 9 July 1963 created the EO14 from the old EO46, which existed by royal decree from 1955 until 1963, and followed the same route as the current EO14.
