= Greek National Road 12 =

Trunk road in Greece

National Road 12
- Εθνική Οδός 12
- Route of the EO12 road, in blue

Route information
- Length: 170.1 km (105.7 mi)
- Existed: 9 July 1963–present

Major junctions
- West end: Lagyna
- East end: Kavala

Location
- Country: Greece
- Regions: Central Macedonia; Eastern Macedonia and Thrace
- Primary destinations: Lagyna; Serres; Mesorrachi; Drama; Kavala

Highway system
- Highways in Greece; Motorways; National roads
← EO10	→ EO13

National Road 12 (Greek: Εθνική Οδός 12), abbreviated as the EO12, is a national road in Macedonia, northern Greece. When created in 1963, it was an indirect alternative to the EO2 between Thessaloniki and Kavala, passing through Thessaloniki and Kavala instead of Amphipolis: today, part of the EO12 west of Serres has been replaced by the A25 motorway.

== Route ==
The EO12 is officially defined as an M-shaped east–west road in the Thessaloniki, Serres, Drama and Kavala regional units: it branches off the A2 motorway at Lagyna, and heads east towards Kavala, passing through Serres, Mesorrachi and Drama. Part of the EO12, between Strymoniko and Mitrousi, has been replaced by the A25 motorway, which leads to Thessaloniki (via the A2) and the border with Bulgaria near Promachonas. The EO12 also connects with the EO2, EO14, EO57, EO59, EO63 and the Liti–Nea Santa National Road.

== History ==
Ministerial Decision G25871 of 9 July 1963 created the EO12 from the old EO42, which existed by royal decree from 1955 until 1963, and followed the same route as the current EO12: until the A25 motorway was built, the EO12 between Lagyna and Serres was part of European route E79.
