= Karacaahmet Cemetery =

Cemetery in Turkey

Karacaahmet Mezarlığı
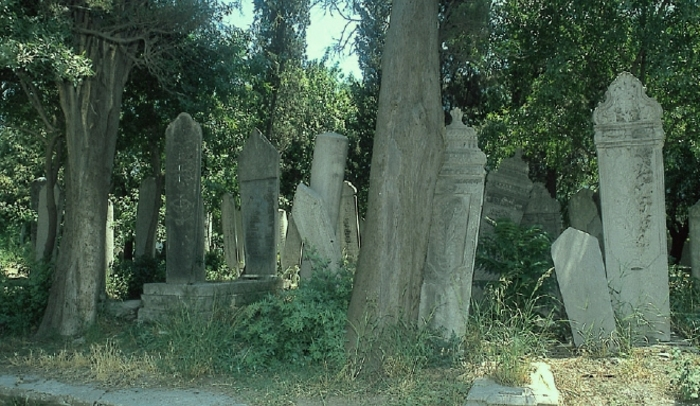
- Old gravestones in Karacaahmet Cemetery
- Interactive map of Karacaahmet Mezarlığı

Details
- Established: Mid-14th century
- Location: Üsküdar, Istanbul
- Country: Turkey
- Coordinates: 41°00′40″N 29°01′34″E
- Type: Public
- Owned by: Istanbul Metropolitan Municipality
- Size: 750 acres (3.0 km^{2})
- No. of interments: over 1 million
- Website: İBB Mezarlıklar Md. website

The Karacaahmet Cemetery (Turkish: Karacaahmet Mezarlığı) is a 700-year-old historic cemetery located in Üsküdar, on the Asian side of Istanbul. Karacaahmet cemetery is the largest and second oldest in Istanbul at 750 acres (3.0 km^{2}), and the largest burial ground in Turkey by number of interred.

The cemetery was named after a warrior companion of Orhan, the second Ottoman sultan and is believed to have been founded in the mid-14th century. Karacaahmet Cemetery, which hosts many bird species, looks like a forest with trees such as cypress, plane tree, oak, laurel, hackberry, and various other plants. The burial ground is covered by high cypress trees.

As a 700-year-old burial ground of historical importance, Karacaahmet Cemetery was declared a natural protected area and national historical landmark site in 1991, in accordance with the decision of the Istanbul Cultural and Natural Heritage Preservation Board. According to this decision, the cemetery area can only be used for burial of the dead, the cemetery cannot be removed or used as a park area in any way.

Karacaahmet Cemetery comprises 12 parcels, each dedicated to different religious groups. Many historical headstones can still be seen with inscriptions written in the Ottoman Turkish alphabet, a version of the Arabic alphabet. The total number of burials is not known precisely, because no records were kept in the past, but it is estimated in millions. Because the burial registers of the Istanbul Cemeteries Directorate started to be kept only after 1937.

The shrine of Karaca Ahmet Sultan, a 13th-century physician and saint of Bektashis, a tariqah of Islam, is situated within the cemetery. There are also many other historical tombs and masjids, which is the Arabic word for mosques, built during the Ottoman period.

== General information and history ==
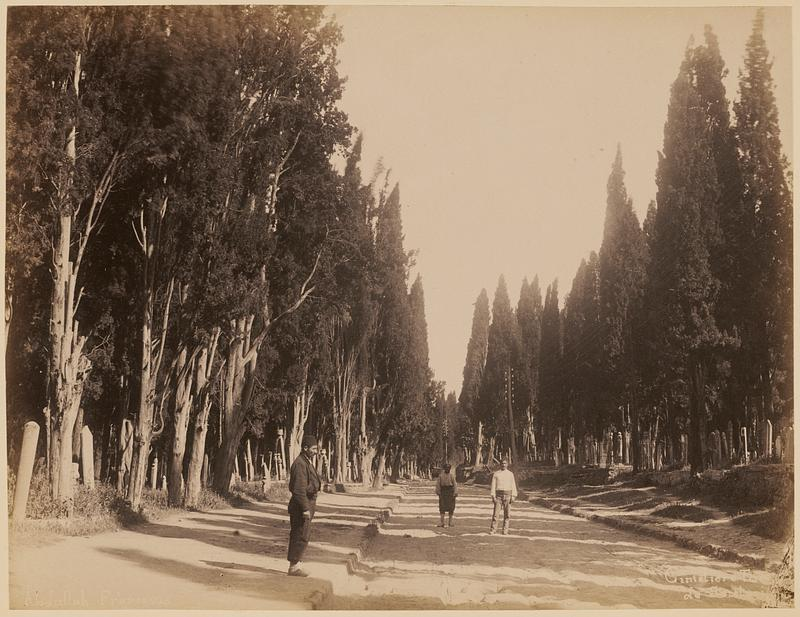
Cimetière Turc de Scutari, ca. 1860-1880; from the Nicholas Catsimpoolas Collection of the Boston Public Library

Prior to the Ottoman period, the ridge occupied by Karacaahmet Cemetery formed part of the extensive extramural necropolis belt situated between the ancient settlements of Chalcedon (modern Kadıköy) and Chrysopolis (modern Üsküdar). Rescue excavations conducted along the southern and eastern borders of the cemetery—particularly around Haydarpaşa, İbrahimağa, and Acıbadem—have uncovered Hellenistic cremation burials, Roman sarcophagi, funerary stelae, and Early Byzantine subterranean burial chambers (hypogea). Furthermore, the presence of Roman and Byzantine architectural fragments reused as spolia within historic structures inside the cemetery grounds attests to the continuous funerary and topographical use of the area since antiquity.

The Muslim cemetery, which began to expand in parallel with the increase in the Turkish population during the reign of Sultan Murad I, expanded further after the conquest of Istanbul in 1453. Karacaahmet was officially turned into a cemetery in 1582 by the mother of Murad III and Selim II's wife, Nurbanu Sultan, who donated 124 hectares of land from her own property for a city cemetery and ordered the cypress trees to be planted there. In addition, she appointed 13 guards for the preservation of these cypress trees and 24 people as gravediggers for the burial of dead.

The name of the cemetery, which was first mentioned in official sources as the cemetery of Karacaahmet Sultan in 1698, is also "Usküdar Mekabir-i Muslimini".

This cemetery, which was originally an empty, vast and clean ground, has always been a favorite place for the people of Istanbul for centuries and has served as a burial ground without interruption since its foundation.

The famous English poet Lord Byron included Üsküdar and the Karacaahmet cemetery in the following lines: «O Scutari! Your white houses look at thousands of graves, and above these graves rises that evergreen tree, that tender and dark cypress, inscribed in the foliage of eternal sorrow, like unrequited love». The cemetery has fascinated foreign travelers for centuries with its impressive view and architectural splendor, and many travelers have mentioned this cemetery in their memoirs. The French poet and writer Theophile Gautier, who was one of the first to describe the cemetery in his memoir, expressed his admiration, saying that Karacaahmet is the largest cemetery in the East. In addition, the Polish Count Edward Raczyński in 1814 in his book “Journey to Istanbul and Canakkale” and the German Generalfeldmarschall Helmuth Karl Bernhard von Moltke in his book “Letters from Turkey” gave a large place to the Karacaahmet cemetery. Calculating that the underground population of Karacaahmet far exceeds the living population of Istanbul, Marshal Moltke said in 1836: "You can build a big city out of these gravestones."

The famous Danish writer and master of fairy tales, Hans Christian Andersen, who was impressed by its size during his visit to Istanbul in 1841, just 5 years after Moltke, described the Karacaahmet cemetery, as if confirming Moltke: “The area of this cemetery is so vast that if sow wheat, it would feed the whole city, and if all the local tombstones were used, then a new wall could be built that would surround Istanbul."

As if in unanimous agreement, Western travelers and writers have argued that the cemetery does not receive much sunlight, because it is covered with cypresses, and looks like a forest in dark greenery. This is one of the rare cemeteries for which poetry has been written in history.

The oldest photographs of the cemetery were taken by Ernest de Caranza in 1852–1854, followed by the brothers Abdullah, Bergren and Photo Sabah. The Anglican clergyman Robert Walsh, who had been the personal chaplain to the British ambassador Lord Strangford in Istanbul since 1820, compared the place to a large forest divided by wide roads on sloping ground. The scene he depicts was engraved by the English artist Thomas Allom.

The excavation works in the tunnel for the Marmaray project caused little damage as by June 2007, a dent of 1.5 m diameter and 4 m depth occurred close to the cemetery wall. It was reported that some graves were damaged.

== Gallery ==
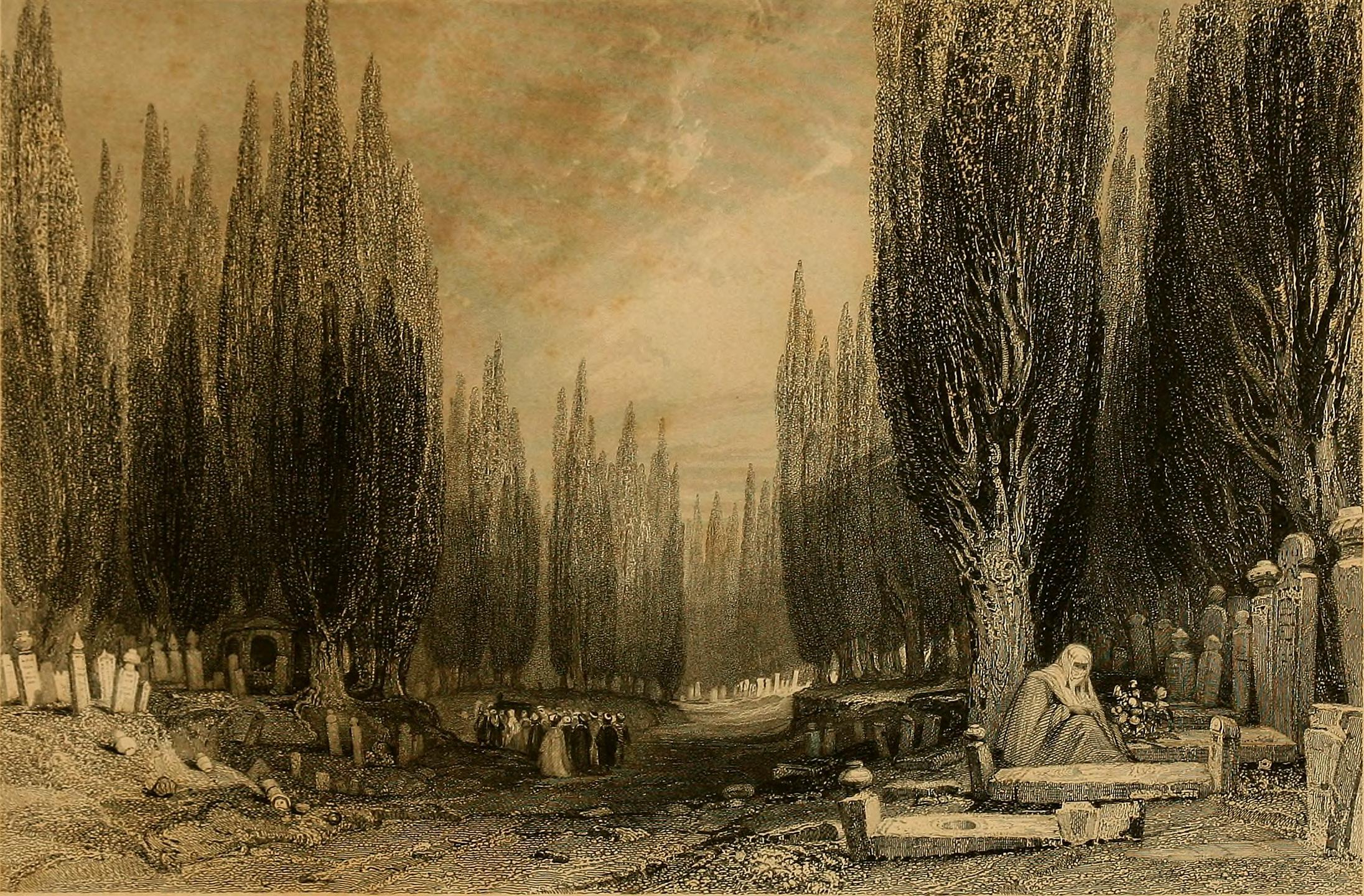
Thomas Allom's drawing from 1839

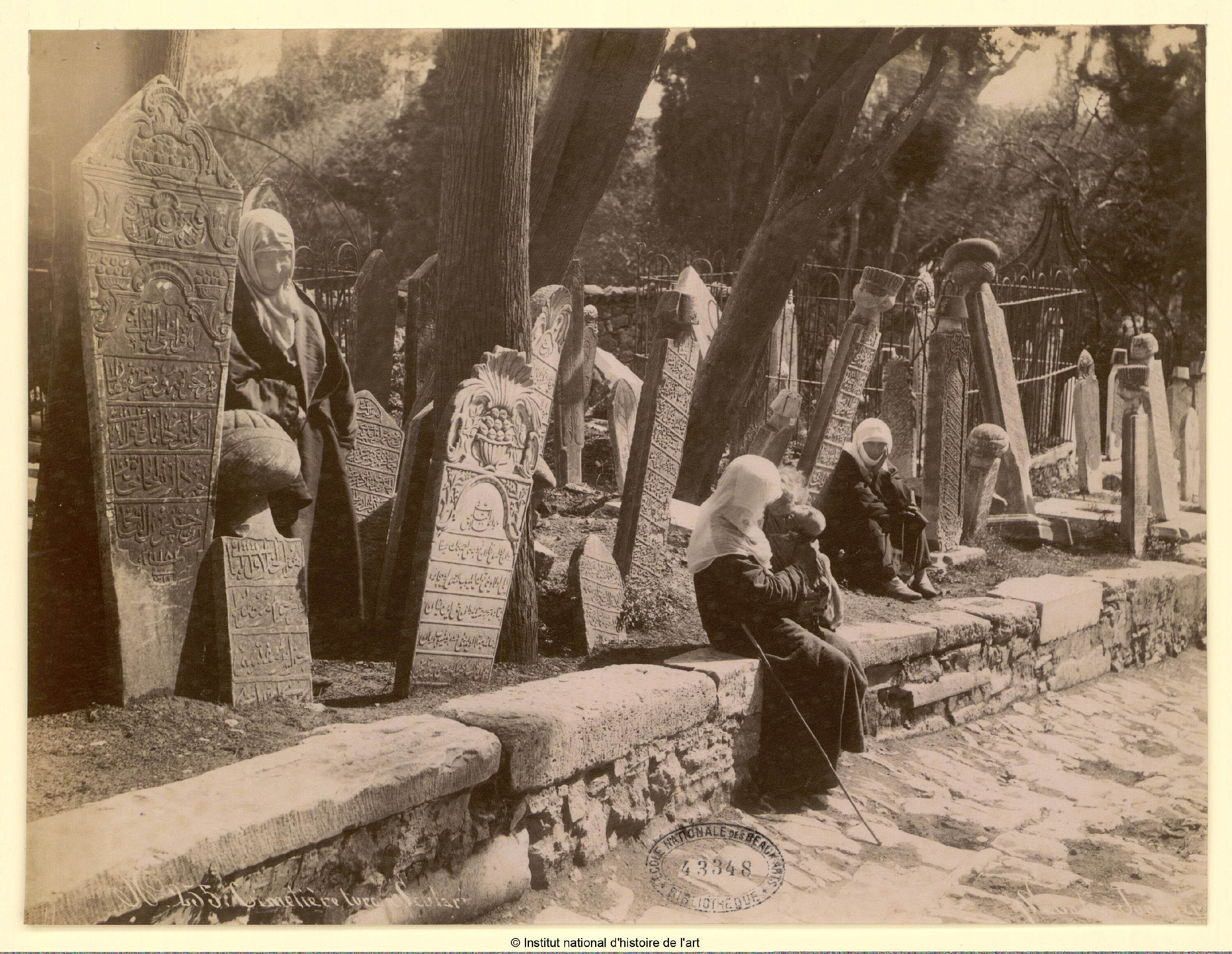
Pascal Sebah Women in Karacaahmet, 1870

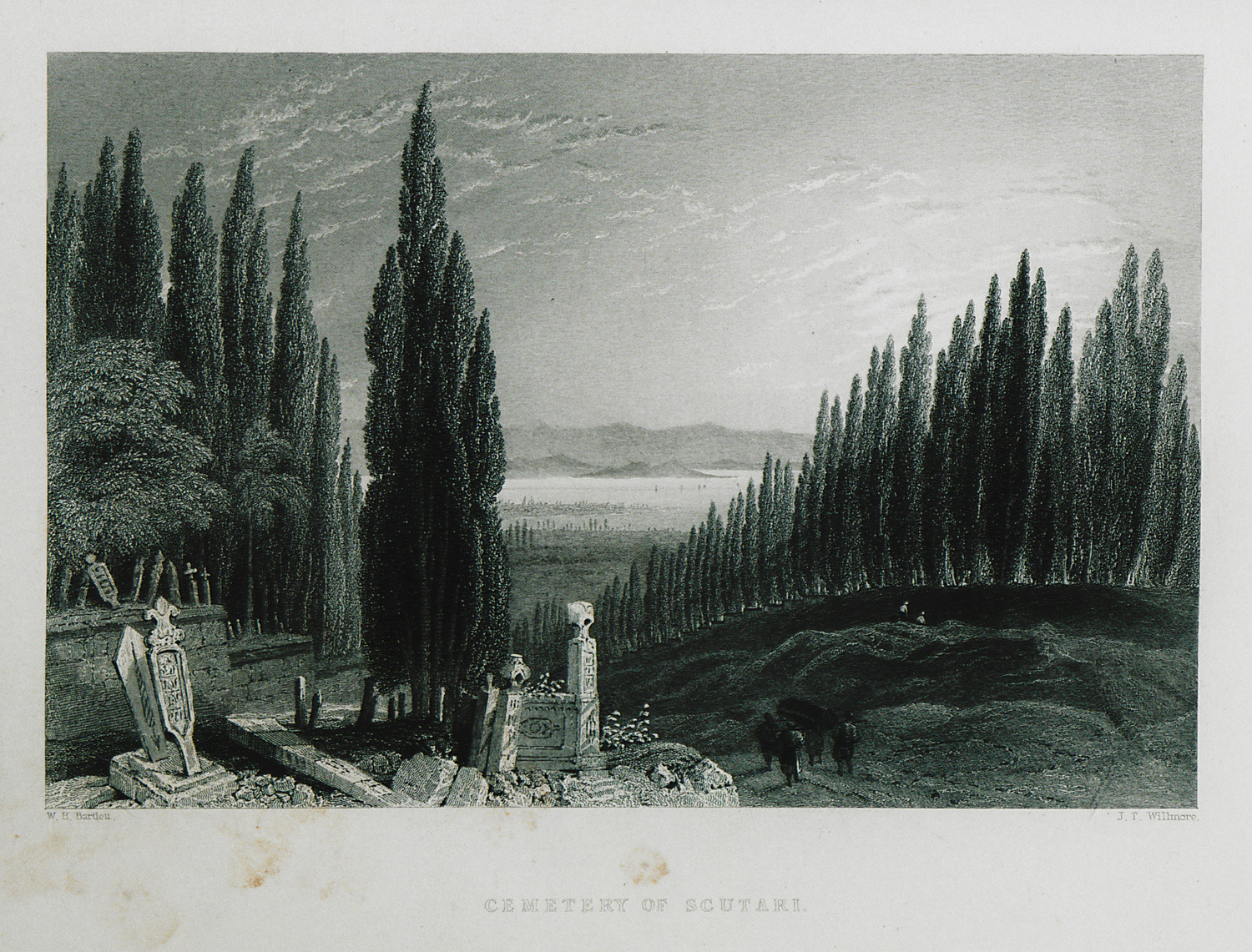
William Henry Bartlett Cemetery of Scutari, 1838

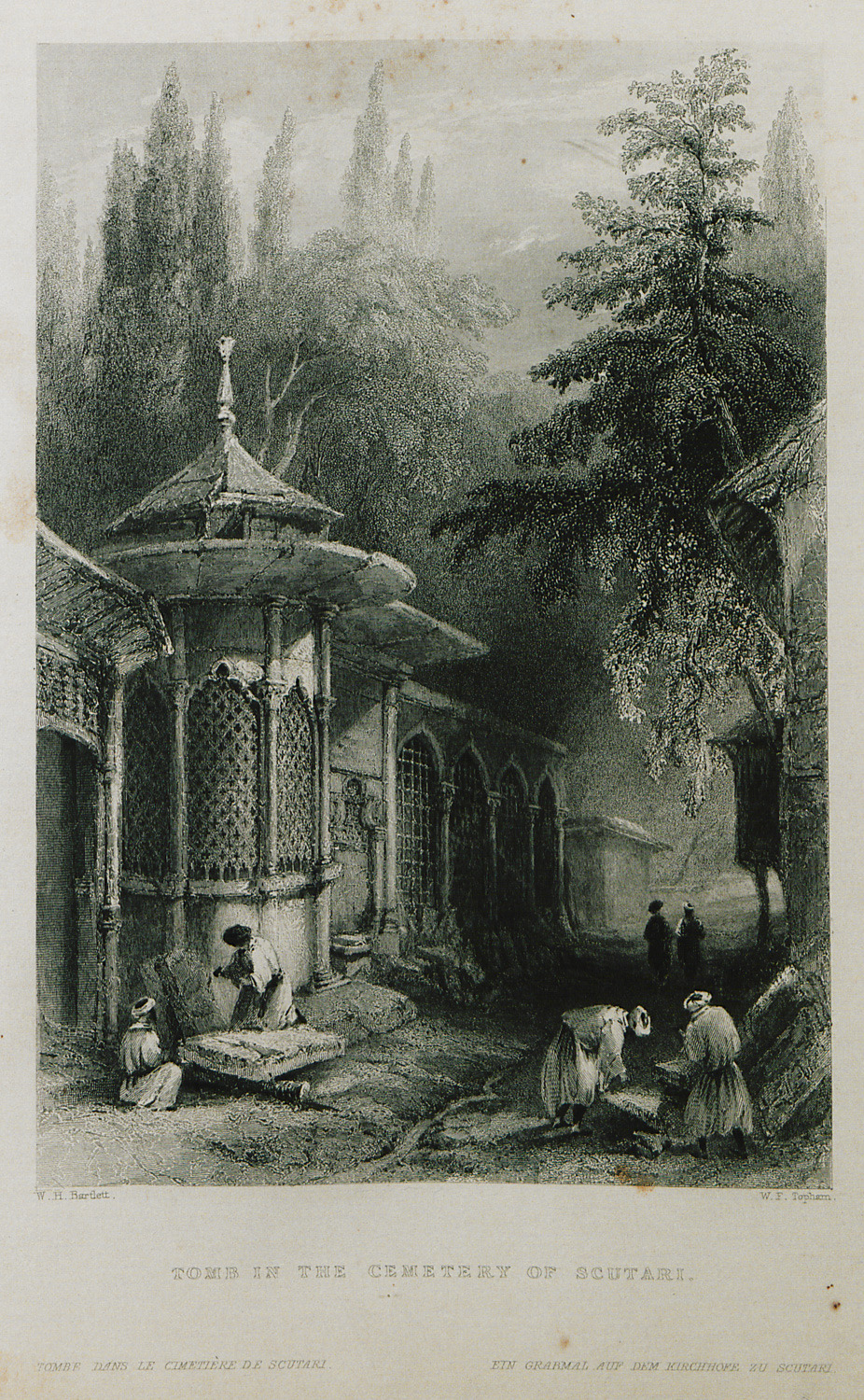
Karacaahmet cemetery, Hoca Sadettin Efendi Sebili, 1838

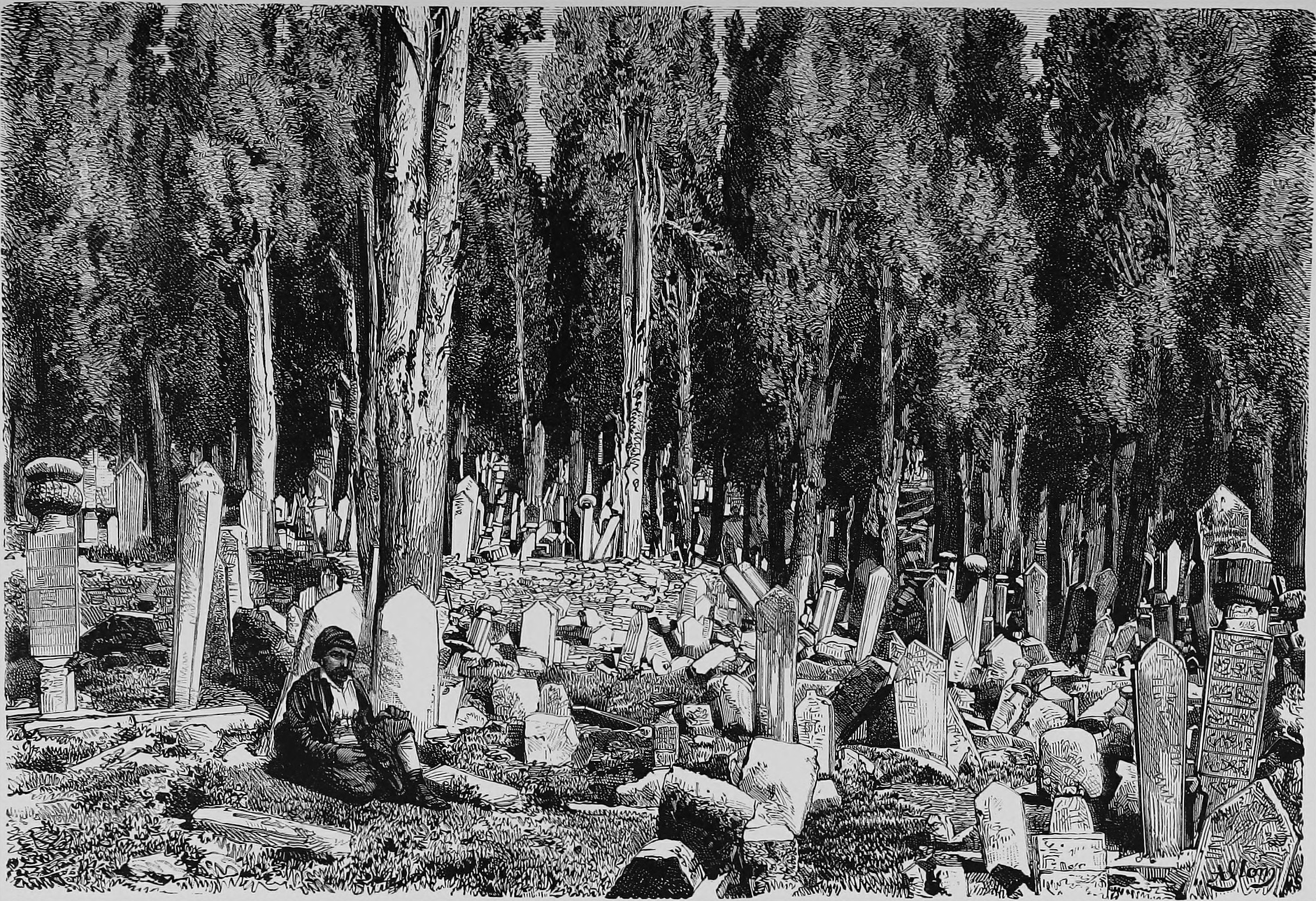
Cemetery of Scutari, 1876

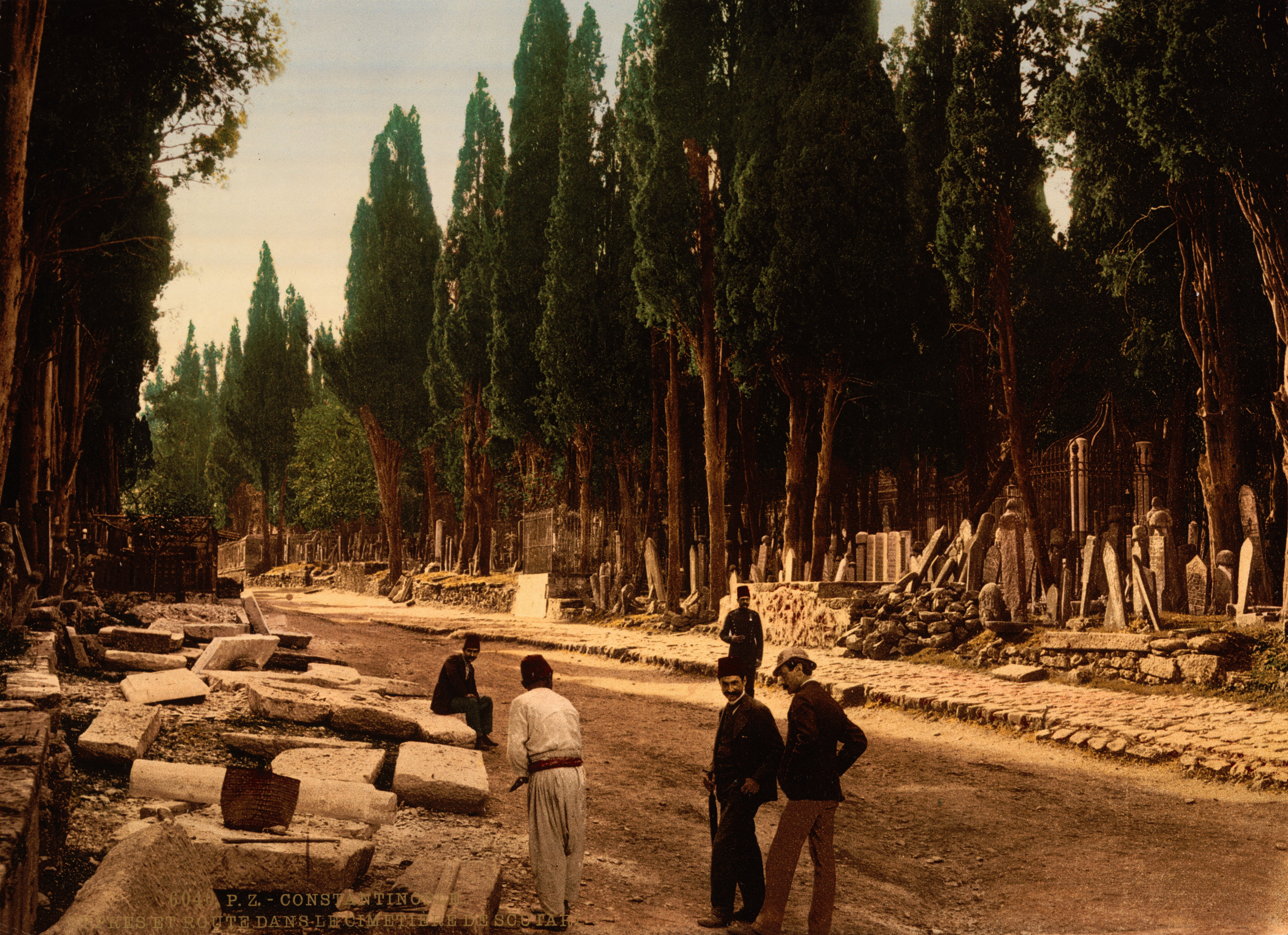
Cypresses and road leading to the cemetery, Scutari, Constantinople, Turkey, 1890s

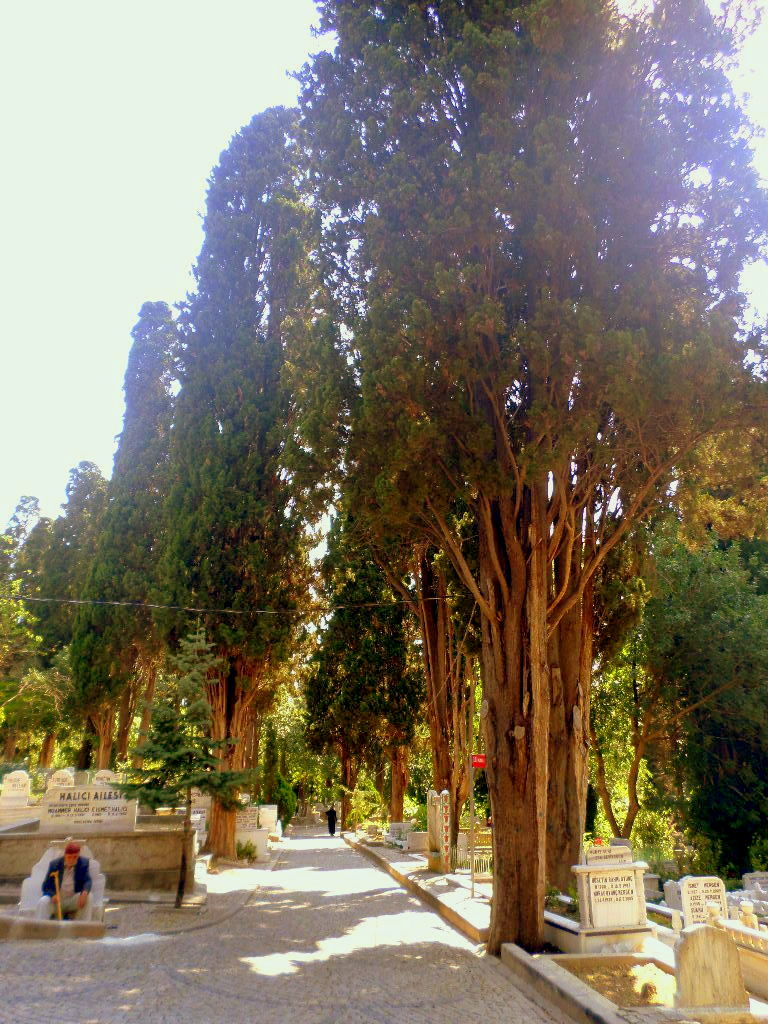
An old man with a walking stick resting in the shade beneath the tall cypress trees on a hot summer day in Karacaahmet cemetery, Istanbul, 2010s

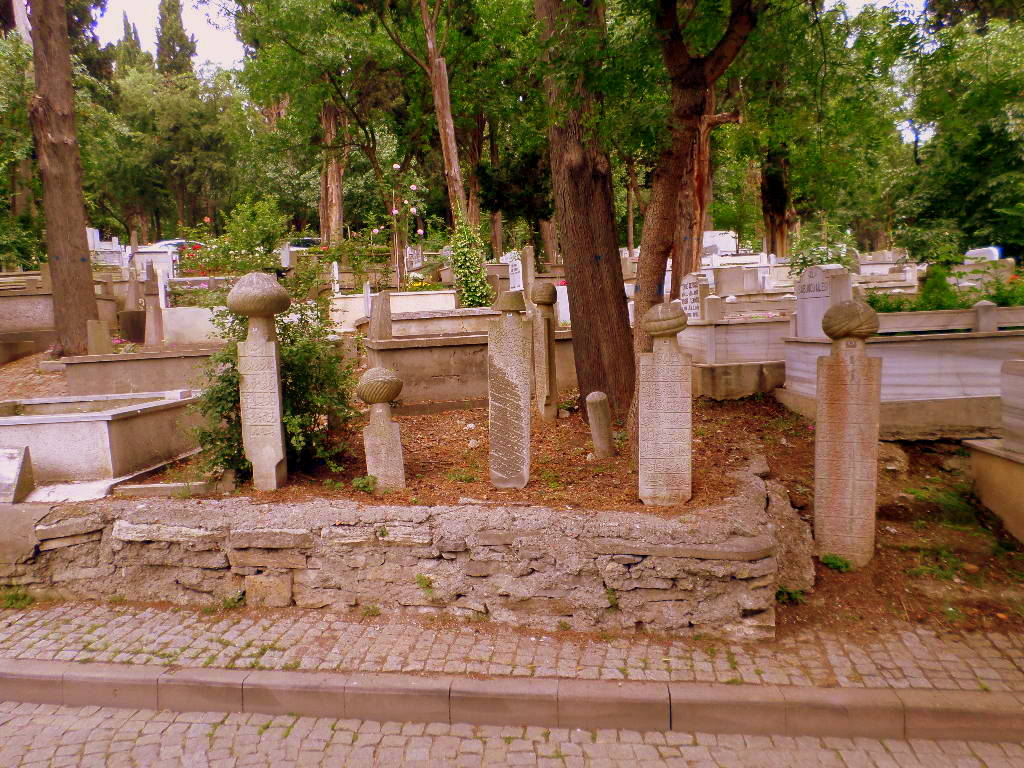
A set of historic Ottoman headstones in Karacaahmet cemetery, Üsküdar, 2010s

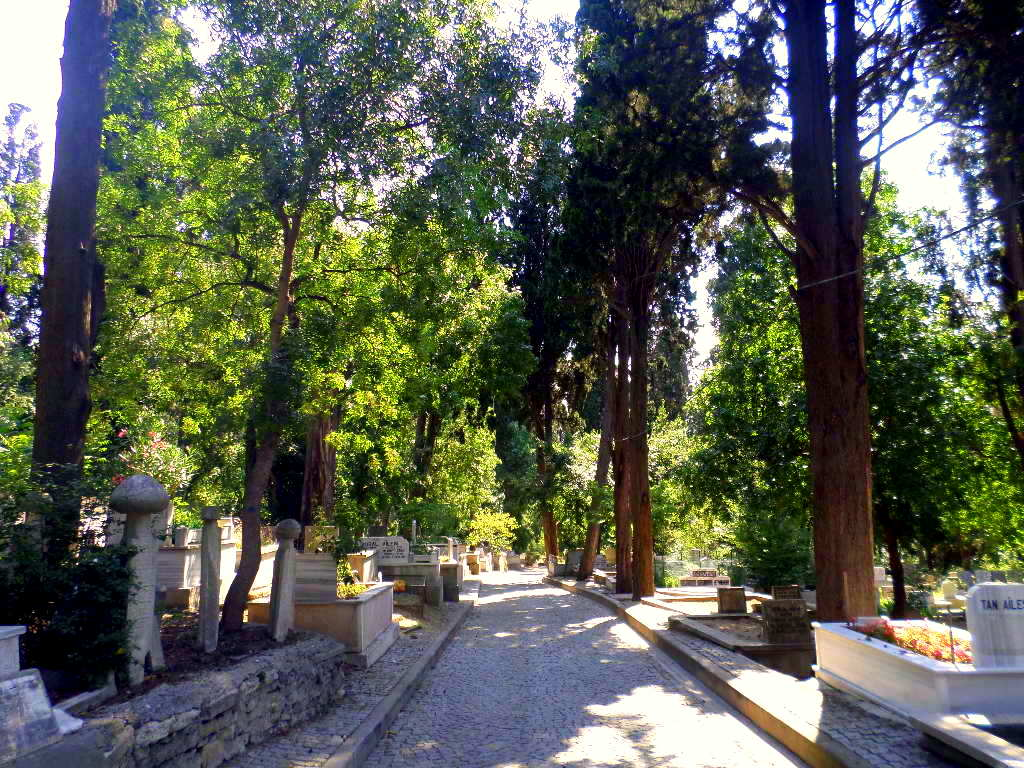
Shady cobblestone cemetery pathway, Karacaahmet cemetery, Istanbul, 2010s

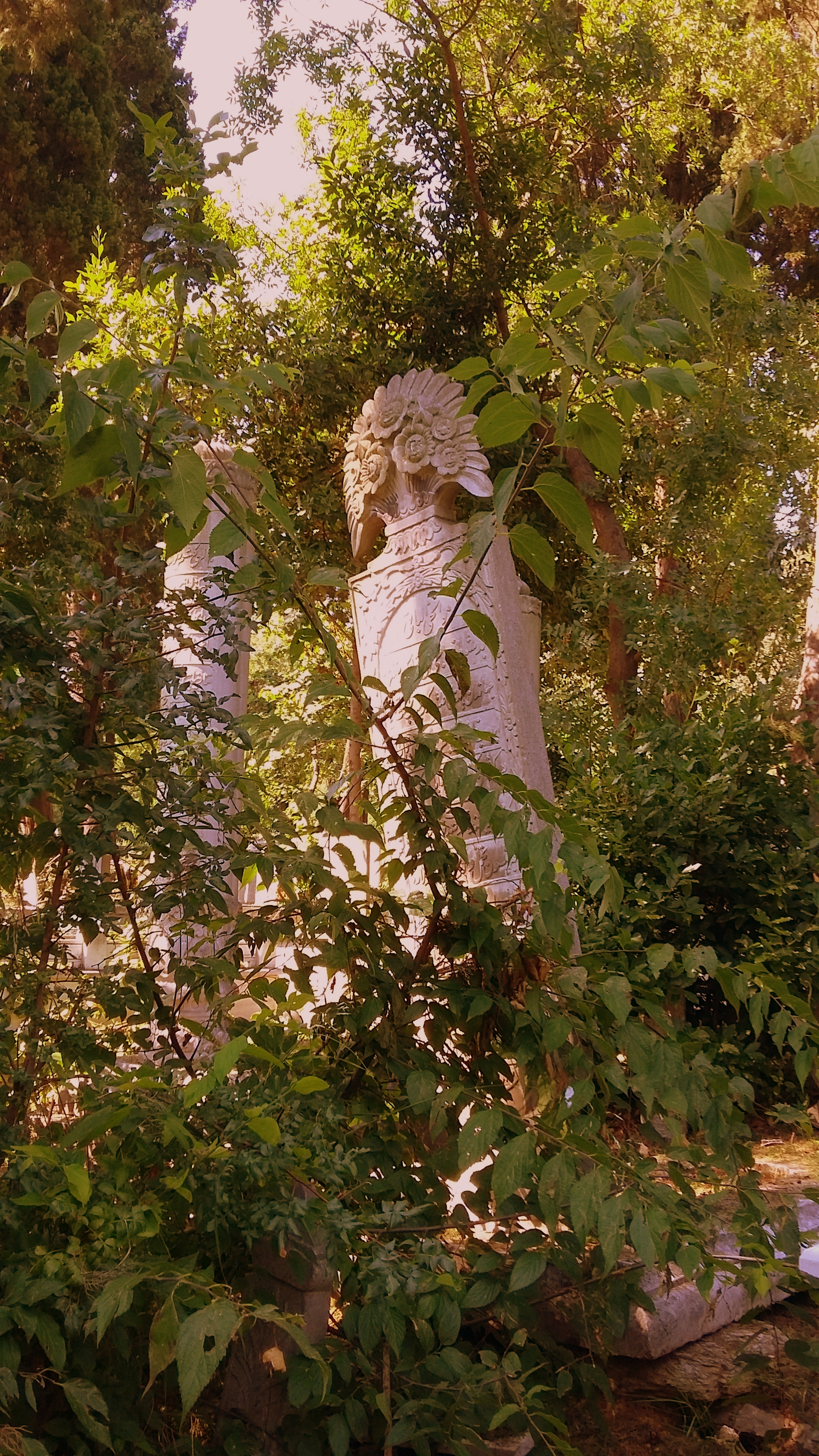
Floral pattern carved stone historical headstone of an Ottoman-era woman at the Karacaahmet Cemetery,2010s

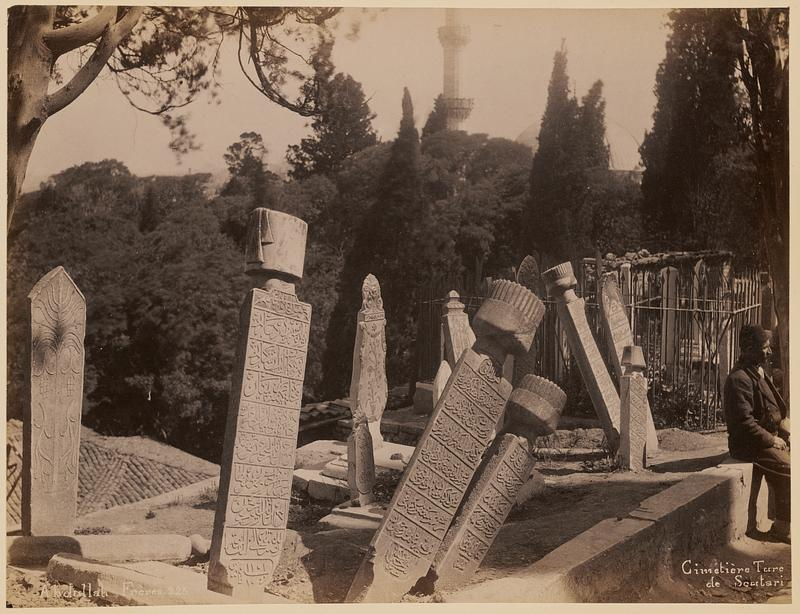
Cimetière Turc de Scutari, ca. 1860-1880; from the Nicholas Catsimpoolas Collection of the Boston Public Library

== Notable burials ==
List is sorted in order of the year of death.

Historical

- Sheikh Hamdullah (1436–1520), calligrapher
- Boşnak Derviş Mehmed Pasha (1569–1606), Grand Vizier of the Ottoman Empire
- Dilaver Pasha (?–1622), Grand Vizier of the Ottoman Empire
- Mere Hüseyin Pasha (?–1624), Grand Vizier of the Ottoman Empire
- Hafız Ahmed Pasha (1564–1632), Grand Vizier of the Ottoman Empire
- Tabanıyassı Mehmed Pasha (1589–1637), Grand Vizier of the Ottoman Empire
- Tarhoncu Ahmed Pasha (1592–1653), Grand Vizier of the Ottoman Empire
- Hafız Post (1630–1694), composer
- Yusuf Nabi (1642–1717), Divan poet of Kurdish descent
- Nedîm (1681–1730), one of the most celebrated Ottoman poets
- Halil Hamid Pasha (1736–1785), Grand Vizier of the Ottoman Empire
- Benderli Ali Pasha (? – 1821), Sultan Mahmud II's Grand Vizier
- Jamaluddin al-Kumuki (1788–1869), Naqshbandi tariqa shaykh and relative of Imam Shamil
- Haji Qadir Koyi (1817–1897), Kurdish poet
- Mehmed Rauf Pasha bin Abdi Pasha (1832–1908), Ottoman Serasker and Vali
- Müfide Kadri (1890–1912), painter and composer; one of the first female artists in Turkey and the first professional female art teacher in the Ottoman Empire

1940s

- Kaçı Vehip Pasha (1877–1940), Ottoman general
- Ali bey Huseynzade (1864–1940), Azerbaijani writer, thinker, philosopher, artist and doctor, and was the creator of the modern Flag of Azerbaijan

1950s

- Mehmet Esat Bülkat (1862–1952), Ottoman general and Senior commander of the Gallipoli Campaign
- Reşat Nuri Güntekin (1889–1956), novelist
- Cafer Tayyar Eğilmez (1877–1958), Ottoman Army officer and Turkish Army general
- Osman Zeki Üngör (1880–1958), composer, initial conductor of the Presidential Symphony Orchestra, general
- Süleyman Hilmi Tunahan (1888–1959), Islamic scholar and Naqshbandi master, his disciples are referred to as Süleymancılar

1960s

- Safiye Erol (1902–1964), novelist
- Fikret Mualla Saygı (1903–1967), painter

1970s

- Nejdet Sançar (1910–1975), nationalist writer and ideologue
- Nihal Atsız (1905–1975), nationalist writer, ideologue, novelist, poet and philosopher

1980s

- Burhan Felek (1889–1982), journalist
- Oktay Rifat Horozcu (1914–1988), poet
- Ömer Boncuk (1917–1988), footballer and high school teacher

1990s

- Hamiyet Yüceses (1915–1996), singer and performer of Turkish classical music

2000s

- Cem Karaca (1945–2004), rock musician
- Nezihe Viranyalı (1925–2004), one of the first Turkish female aviators
- Arif Mardin (1932–2006), Turkish-American music producer
- Nükhet Ruacan (1951–2007), jazz singer
- Mustafa Şekip Birgöl (1903–2008), retired colonel and the last veteran of the Turkish War of Independence
- Saadet İkesus Altan (1916–2007), opera singer, vocal coach and opera director
- Fazıl Hüsnü Dağlarca (1914–2008), poet
- Gazanfer Özcan (1931–2009), actor

2010s

- Verda Ün (1919–2011), classical pianist
- Esin Afşar (1936–2011), singer and stage actress
- Sait Maden (1931–2013), translator, poet, painter and graphic designer
- Muzaffer Tekin (1950–2015), captain, veteran of the Cyprus Operation
- Oktay Sinanoğlu (1935–2015), theoretical chemist
- Tahsin Şahinkaya (1925–2015), Air Force general and one of the five leaders of the 1980 military coup
- Halit Akçatepe (1939–2017), actor
- İbrahim Erkal (1966–2017), singer and songwriter
- Can Bartu (1936–2019), basketball player, footballer and columnist
- Süleyman Turan (1936–2019), stage and film actor,
- Yaşar Büyükanıt (1940–2019), former Chief General Staff of the Turkish Armed Forces,

2020s

- Cahit Tanyol (1914–2020), writer, poet, and sociologist
- Hüner Coşkuner (1963–2021), singer and performer of the Turkish classical music
- Adnan Coker (1927–2022), abstract artist
- Yılmaz Gruda (1930–2023), actor, poet, playwright, and translator
- Şener Eruygur (1941–2023), general commander of the Turkish Gendarmerie
- Burhan Sargun (1929–2023), footballer
- Özkan Uğur (1953–2023), pop and rock musician, actor
- Edip Akbayram (1950–2025), composer and folk/rock musician,
- İlhan Şeşen (1948–2025), musician and song writer, actor
- Şükrü Ersoy (1931–2026), footballer and manager

== See also ==
- Şakirin Mosque
- List of cemeteries in Turkey
