= Nikiforos =

Nikiforos Νικηφόρος
- Municipal unit
- Location within the regional unit

- Location within Greece
- Coordinates: 41°10′N 24°19′E
- Country: Greece
- Administrative region: East Macedonia and Thrace
- Regional unit: Drama
- Municipality: Paranesti

Area
  - Municipal unit: 241.0 km^{2} (93.1 sq mi)

Population (2021)
  - Municipal unit: 1,849
  - Municipal unit density: 7.672/km^{2} (19.87/sq mi)
  - Community: 240
- Time zone: UTC+2 (EET)
  - Summer (DST): UTC+3 (EEST)
- Vehicle registration: ΡΜ

Nikiforos (Greek: Νικηφόρος, Turkish: Nusretli) is a village and a former municipality in the Drama regional unit, of East Macedonia and Thrace, Greece. Since the 2011 local government reform, it has been a municipal unit of the municipality of Paranesti. The municipal unit has an area of 240.998 km^{2}. The 2021 census reported a population of 1,849 inhabitants in the municipal unit and 240 in the community.

== "Drama Köprüsü" ==
The Rumelia Turkish folk song "Drama Köprüsü" (Bridge Of Drama), is set near Nikiforos. The two- to three-century-old bridge has been located between Nikiforos and the nearby village of Karyafiton. Research was conducted by Nikos Latsistalis, the chairman of the Drama Asia Minor Refugees Association with the help of a Turkish refugee from Drama to Bursa.

== Transport ==
The settlement is served by Nikiforos railway station on the Thessaloniki-Alexandroupoli line, with daily services to Thessaloniki and Alexandroupolis.

== People ==
- Ibrahim Pasha of Egypt (1770–1848), A famous Albanian, he is believed to have been born in Nikiforos, then Nusratli.
- Nikiforos also refers to Pheidippides, the herald who ran from Marathon to Athens to inform the authorities that the Persians were defeated.
- Amina Hanim (Arabic: أمينة خانم; Turkish: Emine Hanım; 1770 – 1824) was the first princess consort of Muhammad Ali of Egypt, the first monarch of the Muhammad Ali dynasty.
