= Zeynep Fadıllıoğlu =

Turkish designer (born 1955)

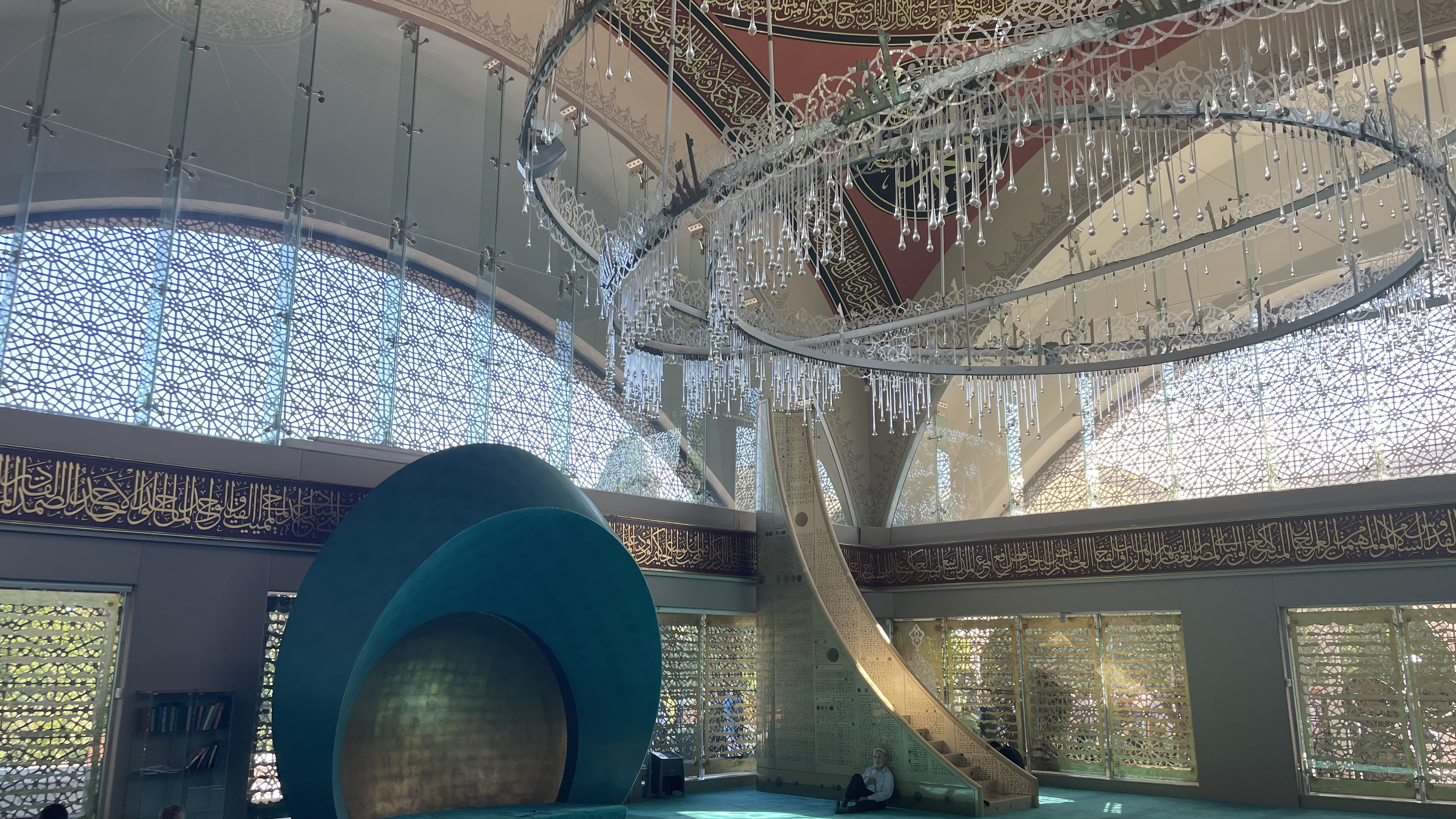
Şakirin Mosque, Istanbul: interior design by Zeynep Fadıllıoğlu (2009)

Zeynep Fadıllıoğlu (1955, Istanbul) is a Turkish designer and owner of a Turkish architecture and interior design company. She designed the interiors of Istanbul's Şakirin Mosque in 2009 to wide international acclaim, possibly becoming the first woman to design a mosque.

== Biography ==
Fadillioglu studied computer science at the University of Sussex and at Control Data Institute. In 1978, she became interested in interior design, completing a course in art history and design at London's Inchbald School of Design. Attracted to the world of restaurants and clubs as a result of her husband's business, she went on to design some 20 establishments before setting up her own firm, Zeynep Fadıllıoğlu Design or ZF Design, where she has completed more than 140 projects. With a staff of 18, her company brings together architects, interior designers and artists. It is licensed in Qatar, the Netherlands, India and Turkey. Examples of her restaurants, hotels and luxury homes can be seen in New Delhi, Abu Dhabi and London. Fadillioglu's design of the Şakirin Mosque has been widely acclaimed despite the fact that it appears to be the first time a mosque has been designed by a woman. In addition to managing her design studio, Zeynep Fadıllıoğlu teaches at Istanbul Bilgi University.

== Designing the Şakirin Mosque ==
Fadıllıoğlu is the interior designer of the Şakirin Mosque in Istanbul, combining modern techniques with traditional Islamic art. Her contributions include a large metal sphere above the entrance, a graceful curved minbar and a glass chandelier crafted in China. Conscious of the need to pay special attention to women, she has ensured that the women's upper gallery matches the men's area of the mosque in both size and beauty. It is separated from the rest of the mosque only by criss-crossed rails. The chandelier consists of globules shaped like drops of water, recalling a prayer that Allah's light should fall like rain. The large windows have gold designs reminiscent of pages from the Quran. The overall impression is one of light, space and elegance. The mosque was built in memory of Ibrahim and Semiha Şakir by their descendants. Zeynep Fadıllıoğlu is in fact their great-niece.

Fadıllıoğlu's design of the mosque makes her the first female interior designer of a mosque, as well as the first woman to design a mosque in modern Turkey.

== Awards ==
Among the awards Fadıllıoglu has received are:

- Andrew Martin International Designer of the Year Award (2002)
- House & Garden International Interior Designer of the Year (2002)
- Modern Designer of the Year, Design and Decoration Awards (London, 2005) for an apartment overlooking the Bosphorus
- The Wifts Foundation International Visionary Award (2011)
