= Agios Dimitrios, Pieria =

Agios Dimitrios Άγιος Δημήτριος
- Community
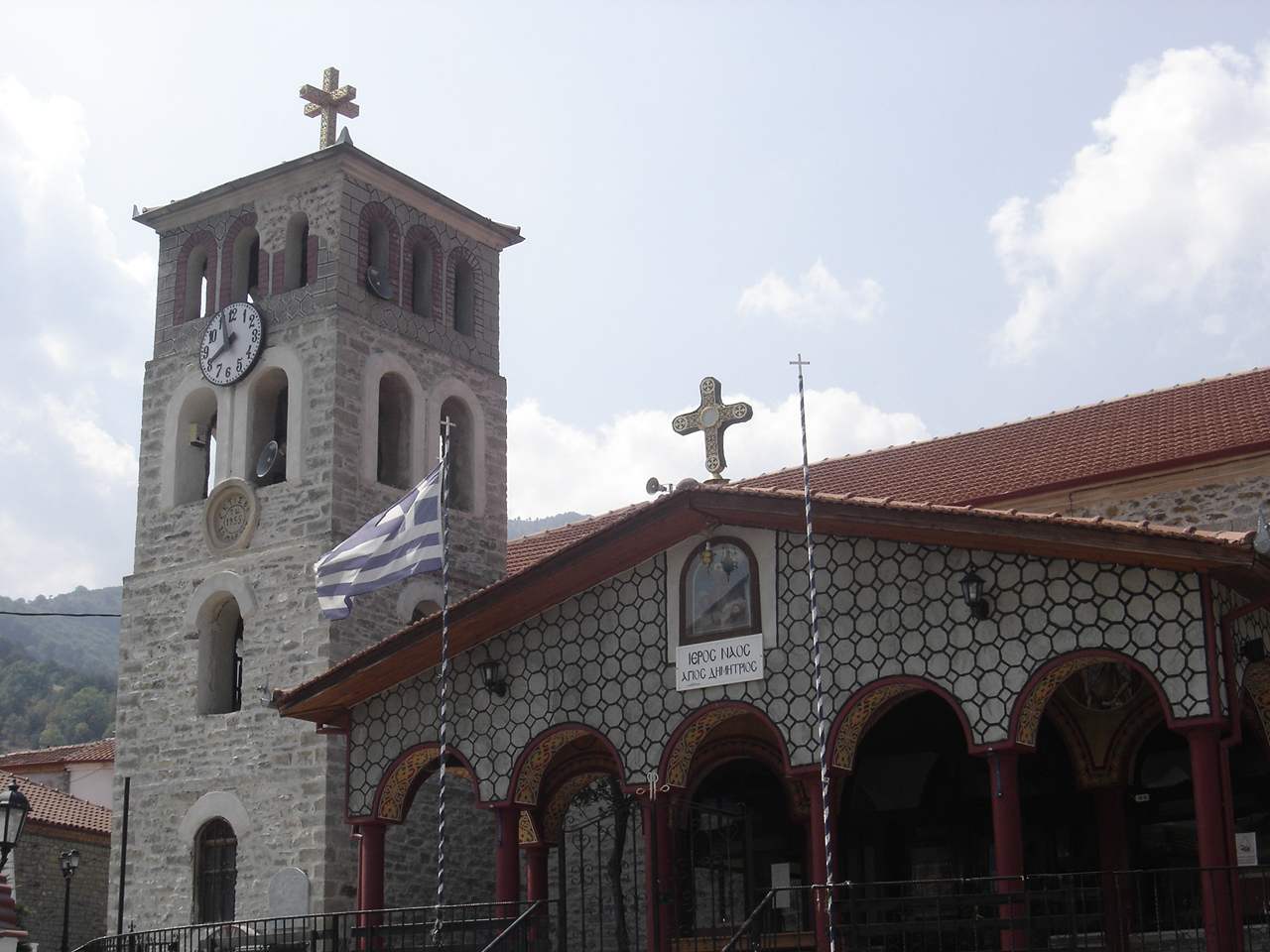
- The church of Agios Dimitrios in the village

- Location within Greece
- Coordinates: 40°09.5′N 22°14′E
- Country: Greece
- Administrative region: Central Macedonia
- Regional unit: Pieria
- Municipality: Katerini
- Municipal unit: Petra
- Elevation: 800 m (2,600 ft)

Population (2021)
  - Community: 520
- Time zone: UTC+2 (EET)
  - Summer (DST): UTC+3 (EEST)
- Postal code: 601 00
- Area code: 23510
- Vehicle registration: KN

Agios Dimitrios (Greek: Άγιος Δημήτριος) is a village and a community of the Katerini municipality. Before the 2011 local government reform, it was part of the municipality of Petra, of which it was a municipal district. The 2021 census recorded 520 inhabitants in the village.
