= Paranesti =

Paranesti Παρανέστι
- Municipality
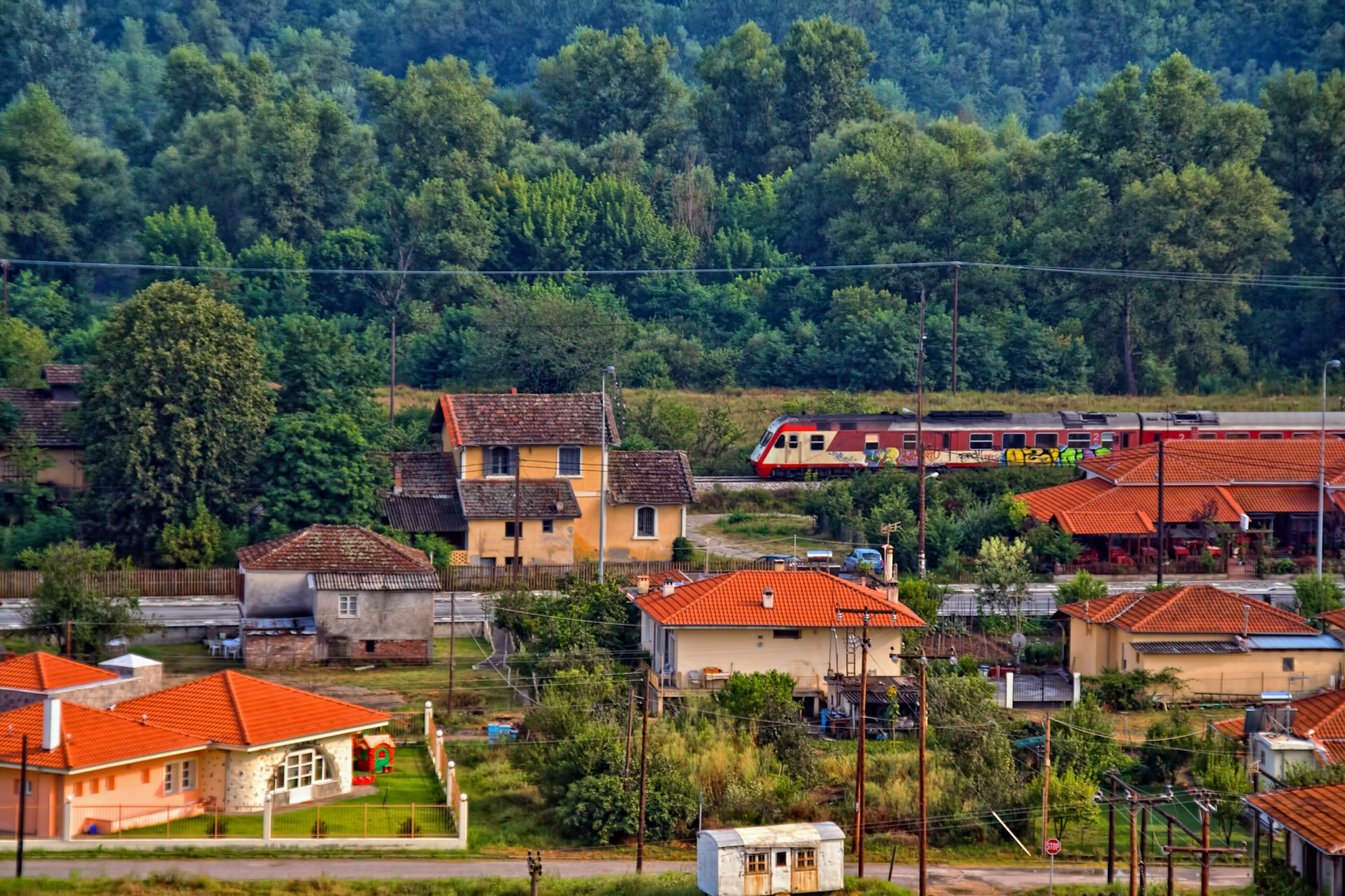
- Paranesti railway station, November 2016

- Location within Greece
- Coordinates: 41°16′N 24°30′E
- Country: Greece
- Administrative region: East Macedonia and Thrace
- Regional unit: Drama

Area
  - Municipality: 1,029.4 km^{2} (397.5 sq mi)
  - Municipal unit: 788.4 km^{2} (304.4 sq mi)

Population (2021)
  - Municipality: 2,843
  - Density: 2.762/km^{2} (7.153/sq mi)
  - Municipal unit: 994
  - Municipal unit density: 1.26/km^{2} (3.27/sq mi)
  - Community: 824
- Time zone: UTC+2 (EET)
  - Summer (DST): UTC+3 (EEST)
- Vehicle registration: ΡΜ

Paranesti (Greek: Παρανέστι, romanized: Paranésti) is a municipality in the Rhodope Mountains of northeastern Drama regional unit, Greece. It consists of two municipal units: Paranesti and Nikiforos. The largest villages of the municipal unit Paranesti are Paranésti (the municipal seat, pop. 625), Mesochório (105), Káto Thólos (123), Χágnanto (43), and Prasináda (32).

The Natural History Museum of Paranesti is located in Paranesti.

== Transport ==
The settlement has a railway station on the Thessaloniki–Alexandroupoli Line.

Paranesti lies on the Greek National Road 14 (Drama to Xanthi). A rough unpaved (gravel and dirt) road connects Paranesti directly with the Bulgarian village of Gorna Arda and thus to the paved Bulgarian road network of Smolyan Province. The full length of the road became usable after Bulgaria's full accession to the Schengen Area in 2025 and locals have called for its improvement.

== Municipality ==
The municipality Paranesti was formed at the 2011 local government reform by the merger of the following 2 former municipalities, that became municipal units (constituent communities in brackets):

- Nikiforos (Adriani, Ano Pyxari, Nikiforos, Platania, Platanovrysi, Ptelea, Ypsili Rachi)
- Paranesti (Paranesti, Sili, Tholos)

The area of the municipality is 1029.392 km^{2}, and of the municipal unit 788.394 km^{2}.
