= Saadet İkesus Altan =

Turkish opera singer (1916-2007)

- Born: Fatma Saadet; 3 March 1916; Üsküdar, Istanbul, Ottoman Empire
- Died: 12 December 2007 (aged 91) Ankara, Turkey
- Genres: Opera, Operetta
- Occupations: Mezzo-soprano, vocal coach, opera director
- Years active: 1940–1970

Fatma Saadet İkesus Altan (born Saadet İkesus; 3 March 1916 – 12 December 2007) was a Turkish opera singer and her country's first female vocal coach and first female opera director. She also translated numerous librettos and lieder into Turkish. She was the author of a textbook of singing technique and a biographical story book.

== Early life ==
Fatma Saadet İkesus was born in Üsküdar, Istanbul, then the Ottoman Empire, as the youngest of three siblings on 3 March 1916. She spent her childhood in Istanbul and her years after age nine in Ankara. Her military officer father fell in the Turkish War of Independence and the family had to move to the new capital when her mother found employment with the Ministry of Foreign Affairs.

Born into a wealthy and educated family with a piano-playing and singing mother and violin-playing father and elder brother, İkesus developed an interest in music. In high school, she was encouraged by her teachers to sing at school events. She graduated from the science branch of Ankara High School for Girls in 1934. At age 18, she was allowed to direct a theatre play. She was impressed by a performance by a visiting Soviet musician group that featured members Dmitri Shostakovich, David Oistrakh, and Lev Oborin.

İkesus then attended the Faculty of Veterinary Medicine without completing her education. After she was accepted into the newly established Ankara State Conservatory, she received a state scholarship to study abroad for music education in Germany, upon the recommendation of composer Paul Hindemith, the German music teacher at Ankara State Conservatory who had been forced by the Nazis to leave his post at the Music Academy Berlin. In 1935, İkesus went to Germany and enrolled in the Academy of Arts, Berlin. She was educated in vocal pedagogy by Heinrich Schlusnus and later in stage acting by Maria Schuli, graduating after three years. She gave her first concert performing songs from Wesendonck Lieder by Richard Wagner on Radio Berlin.

== Career ==
=== Mezzo-soprano ===
İkesus appeared on stage and continued her musical artistic life in Germany during the early years of World War II. She performed on stage at Folk Opera Berlin. She performed as a mezzo-soprano at Theater Duisburg in the operas Rigoletto, Hansel and Gretel, The Merry Wives of Windsor, Don Carlos, Così fan tutte, and Carmen. Stage appearances followed in Düsseldorf, Regensburg, and Essen.

=== Vocal coach ===
In 1941, İkesus returned to Turkey on the request of theatre director Carl Ebert, who had fled Nazi Germany in 1940 to help establish opera and theatre in Turkey. İkesus was employed at Ankara State Conservatory as the first Turkish female vocal coach. She spent most of her professional life teaching vocal pedagogy. She performed in operas and taught vocal pedagogy for 28 years, from October 1941 until 1970.

In addition to her work as a vocal coach, İkesus did stage works, translations, and co-directing.

=== Opera director ===
İkesus became assistant director to Arnulf Schröder, the German director of the Turkish State Theatres, who was appointed chief director of the Ankara State Opera in 1952. She produced the operetta Die Fledermaus by Johann Strauss II, and performed the role of Rosalinde. She was her country's first female opera director. She admitted that "Schröder was her Maestro".

=== Translator ===
Thanks to her knowledge of Italian, German, and English, İkesus translated nearly fifty librettos, including La traviata, The Queen of Spades, Don Carlos, Hansel and Gretel, Salome, Un ballo in maschera, Eugene Onegin, and La fille du régiment , as well as numerous lieder by Brahms, Schubert, Tchaikovsky, and Mussorgski. More than forty hand-written transcripts are in the possession of her son Can Altan.

=== Writer ===
İkesus authored a Turkish music textbook titled Şan Tekniği (Singing Technique) and a biographical story book titled Kara Böcek (literally, Cockroach, her nickname).

== Private life ==
During her stay in Germany, İkesus met German Helmut Henze; they were engaged but did not marry. She married three times, giving birth to her son Can from her last marriage with Erdoğan Altan.

After İkesus's retirement in 1972, the family moved to Istanbul. She spent the last years by her son in Ankara.

== Death ==
İkesus died on 12 December 2007 in Ankara, aged 91. Subsequently, her remains were transferred to Istanbul. A memorial ceremony was held in the Atatürk Cultural Center, where Franz Schubert's lied An die Musik was performed in accordance with her will. Following the religious funeral service at Teşvikiye Mosque, she was interred at Karacaahmet Cemetery.

== Legacy ==
By November 2019, the Süleyman Demirel University in Isparta named its concert hall in the Faculty of Fine Arts in honor of İkesus.
