= Emine Çaykara =

Turkish writer

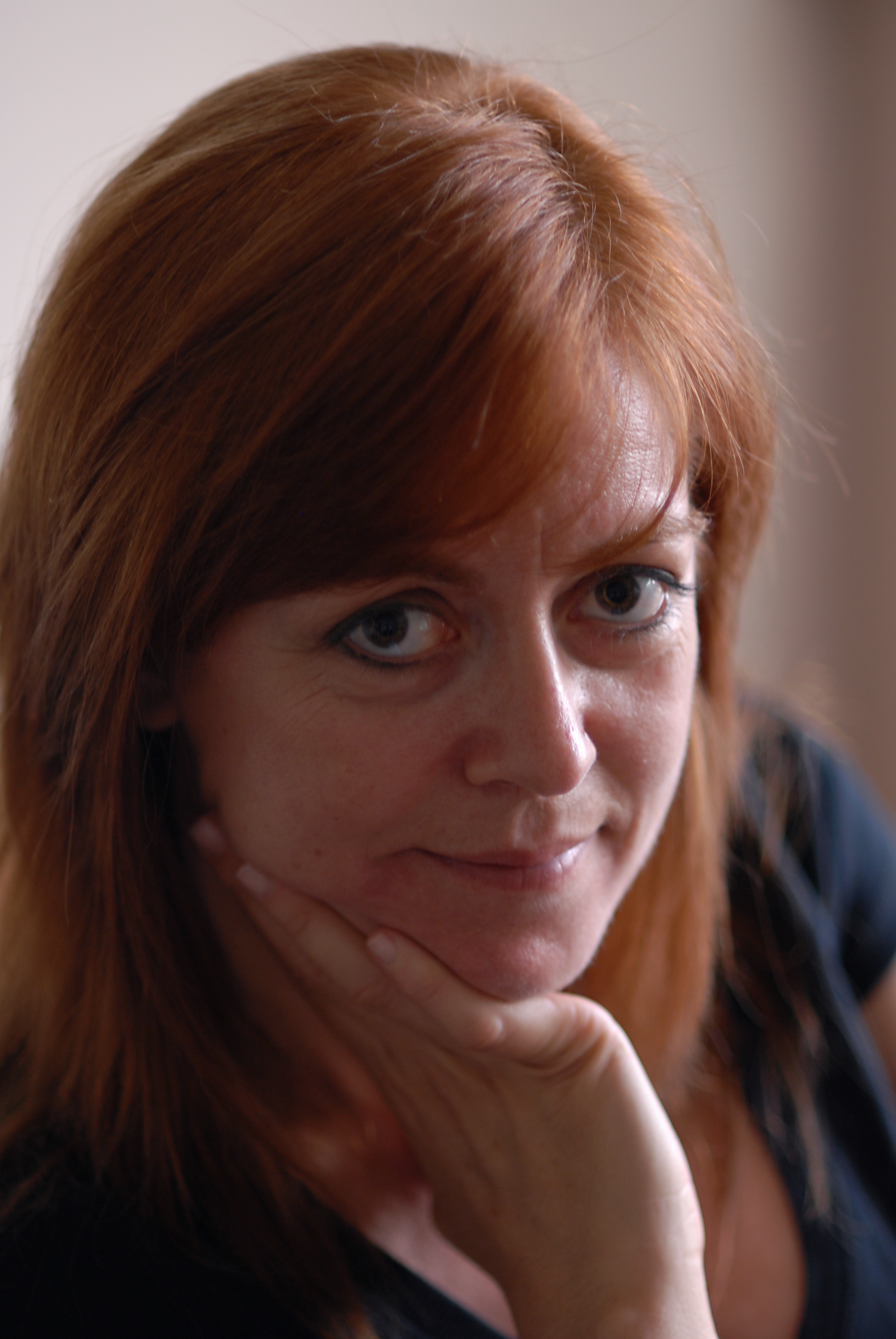
Emine Çaykara

Emine Çaykara (born 1964) is a Turkish writer and historian. Born in Istanbul, Turkey, she is a graduate of Istanbul University’s Classical Archeology Faculty. During her studies at Istanbul University she worked at the Ephesus Museum cataloguing ancient sculptures, followed by a two-year participation with an Austrian Archeological Team during their Artemis’ Temple excavation. Due to her background in French she spent the next few years after graduation as a professional tour guide. During that period she translated many works to Turkish.

Between 1993 and 1994 Çaykara worked as a journalist with the weekly magazine Panorama and as an editor with Turkuaz, a monthly cultural and environmental periodical. In 1994, she joined the periodical Tempo penning a weekly political column The 8th Day and as a science, religion, and culture and arts editor.

After leaving Tempo in 2000, she translated The Best History of Human Being, a book outlining seven million years of human history and development. In 2001 she released her first work, My Angel Mother and I (Melek Annem ve Ben), followed by The Turkish Einstein, Oktay Sinanoglu in October 2001. The following year Çaykara released her third book, The Lad(y) of Archeology, Muhibbe Darga. Her translation of Picasso’s Table was released in December 2002.

Between 2001 and 2004 she worked as editor-in-chief with the monthly magazine SeaLife, published by IDO (Istanbul Marine Coach Enterprises), and Istanbullu (The Istanbulite), a magazine for the Istanbul Municipality.

In September 2005 she edited the book The Turkish Superbrands. She released her fourth work, The North Star of Historians, Halil Inalcik (Tarihçilerin Kutbu Halil İnalcık Kitabı), an in-depth biography of Ottoman historian Halil İnalcık, in October 2005. In April 2007 Çaykara released her fifth work, The Entrusted Shadow / From New Zealand to Gallipoli 1915, a book about an unknown Anzac soldier whose camera and photographs were rediscovered 90 years after his death in Gallipoli.
