= Drama Köprüsü =

Turkish folk song

External videos
- Drama Köprüsü-Bre Hasan Hikayesi
- Εβραιοπούλα- Νίκος Ζιώγαλας
- Debreli Hasan / Ta Daoulia Kroun Greek Turkish Shared Musics
- Καστοριά, Μακεδονία 1917 Kastoria, Macedonia 1917
- Στέργιος Πεισμάνεψε Πέτρος Γαϊτάνος Petros Gaitanos, Greek traditional song from Thrace
- Çambaşına Çıktım Türküsü
- ΤΑ ΝΤΑΟΥΛΙΑ ΚΡΟΥΝ - Macedonian folk song (Nikisiani, Kavala, Greece)

"Drama Köprüsü" (English: "The Bridge of Drama") is a popular Turkish türkü (folk song) and a legend on which the song is based.

== Geography ==
The song refers to the Drama Bridge. The town of Drama, which was then a part of the Ottoman Empire, is now in the East Macedonia and Thrace region of Greece. What is called a bridge in the song is actually an aqueduct between the villages of Nikiforos (Turkish: Nusratlı) and Karyafiton (Turkish: Kozluköy). When viewed from the valley the aqueduct looks like a bridge.

On 17 April 2010 Nikos Latsistalis, a member of a population exchange from Adapazarı as well as the Chairman of Drama Asia Minor Refugees Association and a Turkish muhacir from Drama to Bursa collaborated to pinpoint the location of the "bridge". The families of both men had been effected by the Population exchange between Greece and Turkey of the 1920s, when Turks from Greece had been sent to Turkey and Greeks from Turkey were sent to Greece.

== Legend ==
The song is based on the legend of Debreli Hasan (Hasan from Debre), who lived at the end of the 19th century and the beginning of the 20th century. He was a soldier who killed his superior after a quarrel and was jailed in Drama. He escaped from the prison to hide in the mountains where he lived as a bandit. He was more or less like Robin Hood of English folklore. He robbed the rich and supported the poor. Before becoming a bandit he had been engaged to be married. Judging that life in the mountains would be too difficult for his fiancé, he broke his engagement but continued to send her presents even when she married another man. According to the legend, he was later pardoned by the sultan.

== Song ==
The anonymous song emerged in the early years of the 20th century with the title "Drama Köprüsü". Like many folk songs of the time, several versions exist. The most common first and the last couplets are:

Drama köprüsü bre Hasan dardır geçilmez
Soğuktur suları Hasan bir tas içilmez

At martini Debreli Hasan dağlar inlesin
Drama mahpusunda bre Hasan dostlar dinlesin

Drama bridge is narrow O Hasan, it can't be crossed,
Its water is so cold Hasan that it can't be drunk.

Shoot your "Martini" Debreli Hasan, let its bang echo throughout the mountains,
Let the friends in Drama prison listen (to the sound).

The first couplet is a further proof that the bridge is actually an aqueduct. In the last couplet, the word martini refers to a Peabody-Martini-Henry rifle. In some versions of the last couplet, the word Karakedi ("Black cat"), code name of Hasan's friend, replaces the word dostlar (friends).

The song has been covered by many singers.
