= Şakirin Mosque =

Mosque in Istanbul, Turkey

- Şakirin Camii
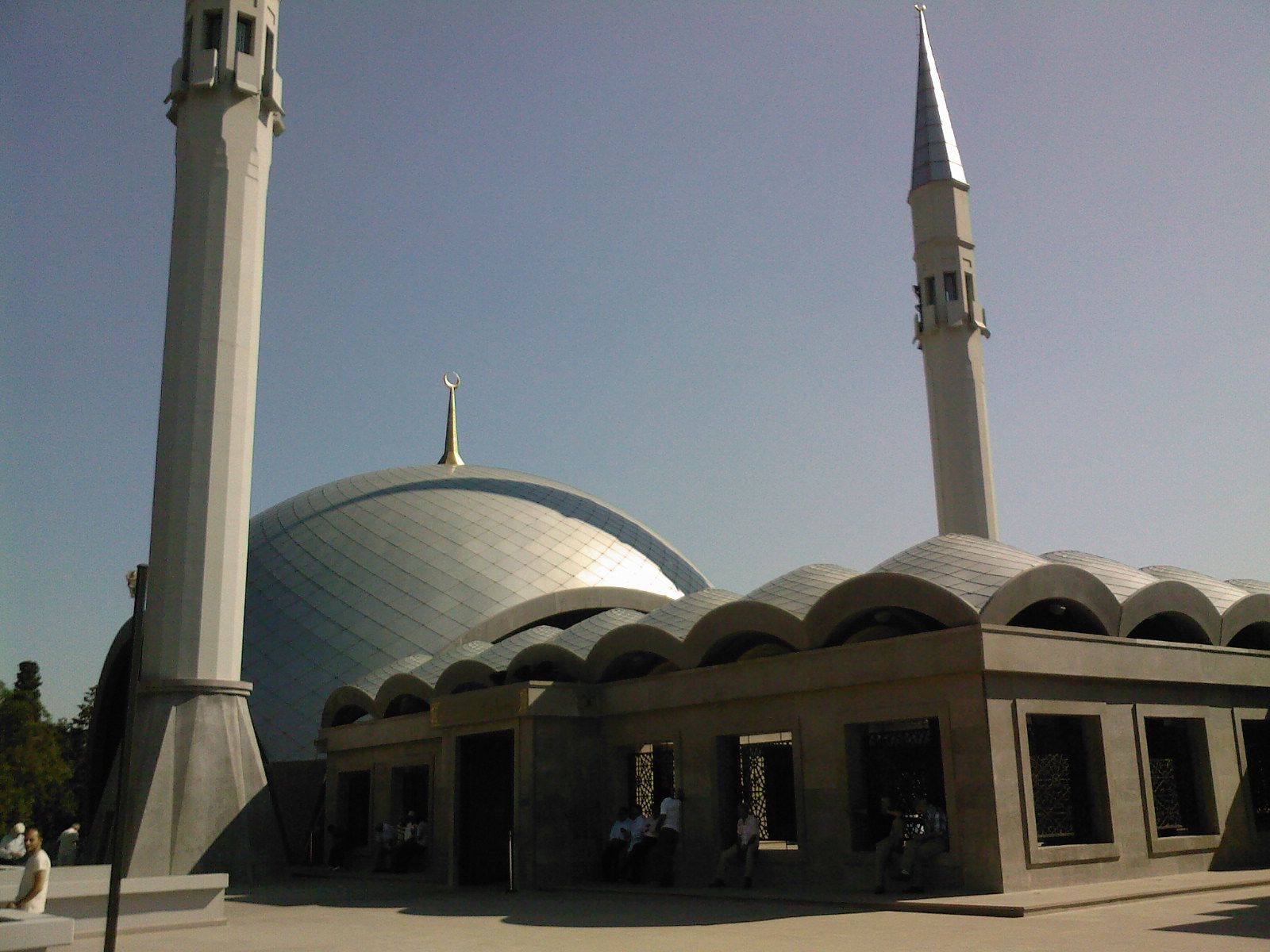

Religion
- Affiliation: Islam
- Branch/tradition: Sunni
- Ownership: Semiha Şakir Foundation
- Leadership: Imam(s): Hüseyin Kutlu

Location
- Location: Üsküdar, Istanbul, Turkey
- Interactive map of Şakirin Mosque
- Coordinates: 41°00′47″N 29°01′28″E

Architecture
- Architects: Hüsrev Tayla, Zeynep Fadıllıoğlu
- Type: Mosque
- Style: Modern
- General contractor: MİM Yapı
- Established: 7 May 2009

Specifications
- Capacity: 500
- Dome: 1
- Minaret: 2
- Minaret height: 35 m (115 ft)
- Site area: 10,000 m^{2} (110,000 sq ft)

Website
- sakirincamii.com

Şakirin Mosque (Turkish: Şakirin Camii; pronounced Shakirin) is a mosque in Istanbul, Turkey. The building is located at one of the entrances of the historic Karacaahmet Cemetery in Üsküdar. It was built by the Semiha Şakir Foundation in memory of İbrahim Şakir and Semiha Şakir and opened on 7 May 2009. According to newspaper reports, it is the most carbon-neutral mosque in Turkey.

== History ==
The mosque's architect was Hüsrev Tayla, known for his work on Kocatepe Mosque in Ankara and for his architectural conservation work. Its interior designer was Zeynep Fadıllıoğlu, a great-niece of Semiha Şakir, and also according to newspaper reports, the first female interior designer of a mosque, as well as the first woman to design a mosque in modern Turkey.

Construction of the mosque took four years. It is 10,000 square meters in area. It has two minarets, each 35 meters high, and a dome of aluminum composite. The calligraphy on the interior of the dome was written by Semih İrteş. The large windows on three sides of the prayer hall were designed by Orhan Koçan. The minbar is acrylic and was designed by Tayfun Erdoğmuş. Decorative motifs are derived from Seljuk art. The large, asymmetrical chandelier has waterdrop-shaped glass globes made by Nahide Büyükkaymakçı, "reflecting a prayer that Allah's light should fall on worshipers like rain," and the women's section is designed especially to allow a clear view of the chandelier. The fountain in the courtyard was designed by William Pye. The mosque is built over a parking garage and also includes an exhibition area. The mosque's architect is believed to be the first woman to design a mosque in modern times.

== See also ==
- Çamlıca Mosque, designed by two female architects
