= 23rd government of Turkey =

Government of the Republic of Turkey (1957-1960)

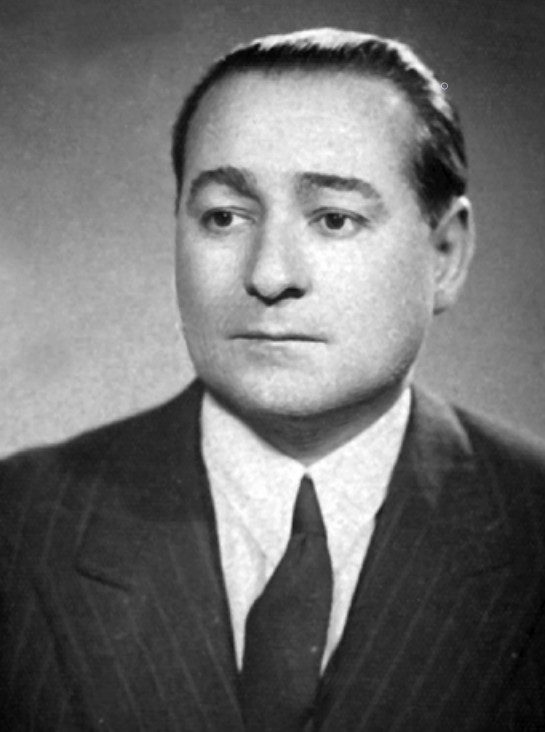
Adnan Menderes

The 23rd government of Turkey (25 December 1957 – 27 May 1960) was a government in the history of Turkey. It is also called the fifth Menderes government.

== Background ==
Democrat Party (DP) won the elections held on 27 October 1957, and its leader Adnan Menderes formed the government.

== The government ==
In the list below, the cabinet members who served only a part of the cabinet's lifespan are shown in the column "Notes".

Title	Name	Notes
Prime Minister	Adnan Menderes	
Deputy Prime Minister	Tevfik İleri; Medeni Berk	25 November 1957 – 19 January 1958; 11 December 1959 – 27 May 1960
Minister of State
Minister of State	Samet Ağaoğlu; Haluk Şaman	8 February 1958 – 4 September 1958; 4 September 1958 – 12 June 1959
Minister of State	Emin Kalafat; Abdullah Aker	25 November 1957 – 4 September 1958; 4 September 1958 – 14 December 1959
Minister of State	Muzaffer Kurbanoğlu; İzzet Akçal	25 November 1957 – 1 November 1959; 1 November 1959 – 27 May 1960
Ministry of Justice	Esat Budakoğlu; Celal Yardımcı	25 November 1957 – 3 April 1960; 3 April 1960 – 27 May 1960
Ministry of National Defense	Şemi Ergin; Etem Menderes	25 November 1957 – 19 January 1958; 19 January 1958 – 27 May 1960
Ministry of the Interior	Namık Gedik	
Ministry of Foreign Affairs	Fatin Rüştü Zorlu	
Ministry of Finance	Hasan Polatkan	
Ministry of National Education	Celal Yardımcı; Atıf Benderlioğlu	25 November 1957 – 8 June 1959; 9 December 1959 – 27 May 1960
Ministry of Public Works	Etem Menderes; Tevfik İleri	25 November 1957 – 19 January 1958; 19 January 1958 – 27 May 1960
Ministry of Construction and Settlement	Medeni Berk; Hayrettin Erkmen	25 November 1957 – 11 December 1959; 11 December 1959 – 27 May 1960
Ministry of Health and Social Security	Lütfi Kırdar	
Ministry of Customs and Monopolies	Hadi Hüsman	
Ministry of Transport	Fevzi Uçamer; Muzaffer Kurbanoğlu; Şemi Ergin	25 November 1957 – 18 September 1958; 1 November 1959 – 9 December 1959; 9 December 1959 – 27 May 1960
Ministry of Industry	Samet Ağaoğlu; Sıtkı Yırcalı; Sebati Ataman	25 November 1957 – 8 February 1958; 10 July 1958 – 1 September 1958; 14 December 1959 – 27 May 1960
Ministry of Economy and Commerce	Abdullah Aker; Hayrettin Erkmen	25 November 1957 – 4 September 1958; 4 September 1958 – 27 May 1960
Ministry of Agriculture	Nedim Ökmen	
Ministry of Labour	Hayrettin Erkmen; Haluk Şaman	25 November 1957 – 4 September 1958; 12 June 1959 – 27 May 1960
Ministry Tourism and Press	Sıtkı Yırcalı; Server Somuncuoğlu	25 November 1957 – 10 July 1958; 10 July 1958 – 17 February 1959
Ministry of Coordination	Sebati Ataman; Abdullah Aker	10 July 1958 – 14 December 1959; 14 December 1959 – 27 May 1960

== Aftermath ==
The government ended with the 1960 Turkish coup d'état.

Preceded by 22nd government of Turkey (Adnan Menderes)	23rd Government of Turkey; 25 December 1957 – 27 May 1960	Succeeded by 24th government of Turkey (Cemal Gürsel)
