= 21st government of Turkey =

Government of the Republic of Turkey (1954–1955)

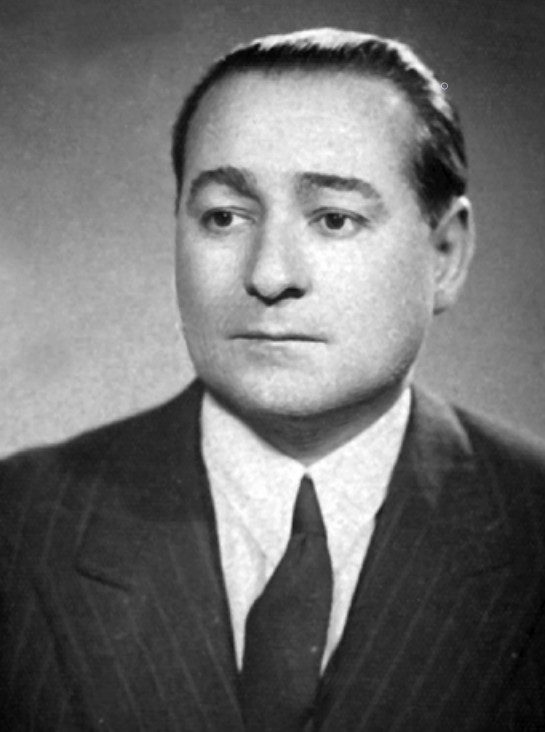
Adnan Menderes

The 21st government of Turkey (17 May 1954 – 9 December 1955) was a government in the history of Turkey. It is also called "the third Menderes government".

== Background ==
The Democrat Party (DP) won the elections held on 2 May 1954. President Celal Bayar appointed Adnan Menderes to form the new government.

== The government ==
In the list below, the cabinet members who served only a part of the cabinet's lifespan are shown in the column "Notes". The cabinet was consisted of the following:

Title	Name	Notes
Prime Minister	Adnan Menderes	
Deputy Prime Minister	Fatin Rüştü Zorlu; Fuat Köprülü	17 May 1954 – 29 July 1955; 29 July 1955 – 9 December 1955
Minister of State
Minister of State	Mükerrem Sarol	17 May 1954 – 12 October 1955
Minister of State	Osman Kapani; Etem Menders	17 May 1954 – 15 September 1955; 15 September 1955 – 30 September 1955
Minister of State	Fahrettin Ulaş	30 September 1955 – 9 December 1955
Ministry of Justice	Osman Şevki Çiçekdağ	
Minister of National Defence	Etem Menderes; Adnan Menderes	17 May 1954 – 15 September 1955; 15 September 1955 – 9 December 1955
Ministry of the Interior	Namık Gedik; Etem Menderes	17 May 1954 – 10 September 1955; 30 September 1955 – 9 December 1955
Ministry of Foreign Affairs	Fuat Köprülü	15 April 1955 – 29 July 1955
Ministry of Finance	Hasan Polatkan	
Ministry of National Education	Celal Yardımcı	
Ministry of Public Works	Kemal Zeytinoğlu	
Ministry of Health and Social Security	Behçet Uz	
Ministry of Customs and Monopolies	Emin Kalafat	
Ministry of Transport	Muammer Çavuşoğlu	
Ministry of Establishments	Fethi Çelikbaş; Samet Ağaoğlu	17 May 1954 – 6 December 1954; 6 December 1954 – 9 December 1955
Ministry of Economy and Commerce	Sıtkı Yırcalı	
Ministry of Agriculture	Nedim Ökmen	
Ministry of Labour	Hayrettin Erkmen	

== Aftermath ==
Although the government had the support of the majority in the parliament, Adnan Menderes resigned because of a political crisis about press freedom, called the "right to prove" (Turkish: İspat hakkı). Following this resignation, a group of MPs left the DP to form the Liberty Party.

Preceded by 20th government of Turkey (Adnan Menderes)	21st Government of Turkey; 17 June 1954 – 9 December 1955	Succeeded by 22nd government of Turkey (Adnan Menderes)
