= 20th government of Turkey =

Government of the Republic of Turkey (1951-1954)

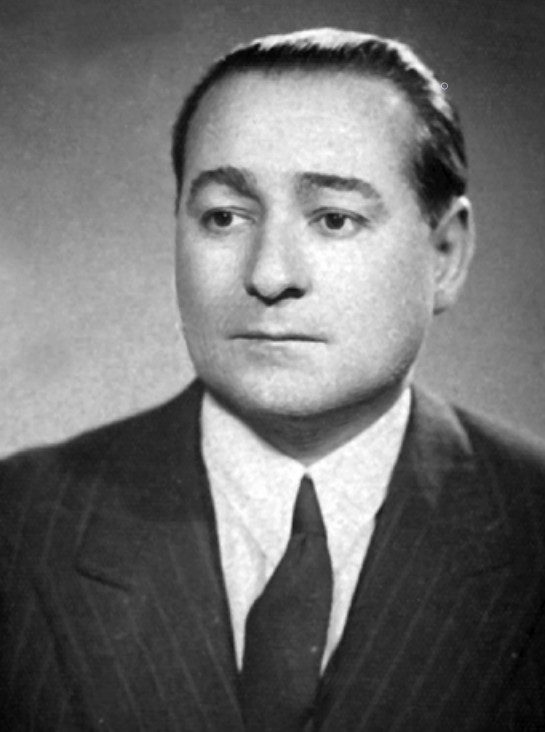
Adnan Menderes

The 20th government of Turkey (9 March 1951 – 17 May 1954) was a government in the history of Turkey. It is also called the second Menderes government.

== Background ==
Democrat Party (DP) had won the elections held on 14 May 1950, but prime minister Adnan Menderes resigned on 8 March 1951 in order to renew his cabinet. There were three new names in the new cabinet.

== The government ==
In the list below, the cabinet members who served only a part of the cabinet's lifespan are shown in the column "Notes".

Title	Name	Notes
Prime Minister	Adnan Menderes	
Deputy Prime Minister	Samet Ağaoğlu	9 March 1951 – 10 November 1952
Minister of State
Minister of State	Fethi Çelikbaş	8 April 1953 – 28 May 1953
Minister of State	Refik Şevket İnce; Fevzi Lütfi Karaosmanoğlu; Muammer Alakant; Celal Yardımcı	9 March 1951 – 30 March 1951; 18 June 1951 – 2 December 1951; 1 November 1952 – 8 April 1953; 8 April 1953 – 17 May 1954
Ministry of Justice	Rüknettin Nasuhioğlu; Osman Şevki Çiçekdağ	9 March 1951 – 10 November 1952; 10 November 1952 – 17 May 1954
Ministry of National Defense	Hulusi Köymen; Seyfi Kurtbek; Kenan Yılmaz	9 March 1951 – 10 November 1952; 10 November 1952 – 1 November 1953; 1 November 1953 – 17 May 1954
Ministry of the Interior	Halil Özyörük; Fevzi Lütfi Karaosmanoğlu; Etem Menderes	9 March 1951 – 20 October 1951; 2 December 1951 – 7 April 1952; 1 August 1952 – 17 May 1954
Ministry of Foreign Affairs	Fuat Köprülü	
Ministry of Finance	Hasan Polatkan	
Ministry of National Education	Tevfik İleri; Rıfkı Salim Burçak	9 March 1951 – 8 April 1953; 8 April 1953 – 17 May 1954
Ministry of Public Works	Kemal Zeytinoğlu	
Ministry of Health and Social Security	Ekrem Hayri Üstündağ	
Ministry of Customs and Monopolies	Rıfkı Salim Burçak; Nuri Özsan; Sıtkı Yırcalı; Emin Kalafat	9 March 1951 – 26 October 1951; 26 October 1951 – 2 December 1951; 2 December 1951 – 18 September 1952; 8 April 1953 – 17 May 1954
Ministry of Transport	Seyfi Kurtbek; Yümnü Üresin	9 March 1951 – 10 November 1952; 10 November 1952 – 17 May 1954
Ministry of Establishments	Hakkı Gedik; Sıtkı Yırcalı	9 March 1951 – 14 December 1951; 18 September 1952 – 17 May 1954
Ministry of Economy and Commerce	Muhlis Ata; Enver Güreli; Fethi Çelikbaş	9 March 1951 – 1 November 1952; 1 November 1952 – 27 May 1953; 28 May 1953 – 17 May 1954
Ministry of Agriculture	Nedim Ökmen	
Ministry of Labour	Nuri Özsan; Samet Ağaoğlu; Hayrettin Erkmen	9 March 1951 – 10 November 1952; 10 November 1952 – 8 April 1953; 8 April 1953 – 17 May 1954

== Aftermath ==
The government ended with the general elections held on 2 May 1954.

Preceded by 19th government of Turkey (Adnan Menderes)	20th Government of Turkey; 9 March 1951 – 17 May 1954	Succeeded by 21st government of Turkey (Adnan Menderes)
