= 22nd government of Turkey =

Government of the Republic of Turkey (1955-1957)

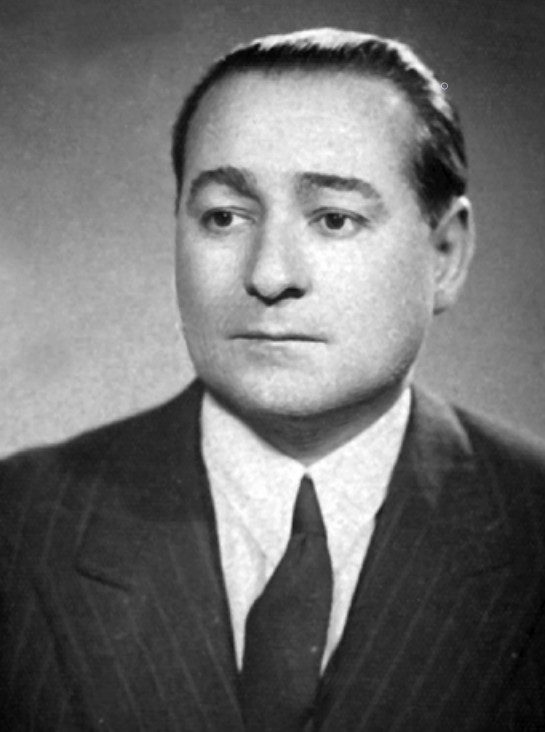
Adnan Menderes

The 22nd government of Turkey (9 December 1955 – 25 November 1957) was a government in the history of Turkey. It is also called the fourth Menderes government.

== Background ==
Adnan Menderes, the prime minister of the previous government resigned because of a political crisis about press freedom, called the "right to prove" (Turkish: İspat hakkı). However, his party, the Democrat Party (DP), had the majority in the parliament, and therefore he founded the next cabinet.

The cabinet received a vote of confidence (343 to 37) on 14 December 1955.

== The government ==
In the list below, the cabinet members who served only a part of the cabinet's lifespan are shown in the column "Notes". The members of the cabinet were as follows:

Title	Name	Notes
Prime Minister	Adnan Menderes	
Minister of State
Minister of State	Cemil Bengü	9 December 1955 – 12 October 1955
Minister of State	Şemi Ergin; Fatin Rüştü Zorlu	9 December 1955 – 28 July 1957; 28 July 1957 – 25 November 1957
Minister of State	Emin Kalafat	
Minister of State	Celal Yardımcı	
Ministry of Justice	Hüseyin Avni Göktürk	
Ministry of National Defense	Şemi Ergin	28 July 1957 – 25 November 1957
Ministry of the Interior	Etem Menderes; Namık Gedik	9 December 1955 – 12 October 1956; 12 October 1956 – 25 November 1957
Ministry of Foreign Affairs	Fuat Köprülü	9 December 1955 – 20 June 1956
Ministry of Finance	Nedim Ökmen; Hasan Polatkan	9 December 1955 – 24 August 1956; 3 December 1956 – 25 November 1957
Ministry of National Education	Ahmet Özel; Tevfik İleri; Celal Yardımcı	9 December 1955 – 12 April 1957; 12 April 1957 – 25 November 1957
Ministry of Public Works	Muammer Çavuşoğlu; Etem Menderes	9 December 1955 – 12 October 1956; 12 October 1956 – 25 November 1957
Ministry of Health and Social Security	Nafiz Körez	
Ministry of Customs and Monopolies	Hadi Hüsman	
Ministry of Transport	Arif Demirer	
Ministry of Establishments	Samet Ağaoğlu	After 2 September 1957, the ministry was renamed the Ministry of Industry
Ministry of Economy and Commerce	Fahrettin Ulaş; Zeyyat Mandalinci; Abdullah Aker	9 December 1955 – 13 April 1956; 7 May 1956 – 30 November 1956; 30 November 1956 – 25 November 1957
Ministry of Agriculture	Esat Budakoğlu	
Ministry of Labour	Mümtaz Tarhan	

== Aftermath ==
The government ended because of the general elections held on 27 October 1957, in which DP won the majority once again, albeit with reduced support.

Preceded by 21st government of Turkey (Adnan Menderes)	22nd government of Turkey; 9 December 1955 – 25 November 1957	Succeeded by 23rd government of Turkey (Adnan Menderes)
