= Ayhan Aydan =

Turkish opera singer

Ayhan Aydan (1924 – 19 February 2009) was a Turkish opera singer.

== Biography ==
She was born in 1924 in Ankara. In 1944, she graduated from Ankara State Conservatory Opera Department. She appeared in some small operas. Carl Ebert noticed her, and her role as Susanna in the opera The Marriage of Figaro started her professional career. When she was 19 years old, she married musician Hasan Ferit Alnar and had a son named Aydan from this marriage. Ebert wanted to take Ayhan Aydan to England to participate on stage at the Glyndebourne Opera Festival, but she could not participate for some reason.

In 1951, Ayhan Aydan's uncle, Mithat Dulge, the General Manager of Ziraat Bank, held a reception for Adnan Menderes at Çubuk Dam, a resort near Ankara.. It was at this reception that Ayhan Aydan met Menderes.

Aydan and Menderes were involved in a scandal that led to charges of adultery and baby-killing. Menderes was the first democratically elected prime minister of Turkey. In 1960, the May 27 coup d'état toppled the government, and Menderes and others were imprisoned on the island Yassıada and put on trial in a courthouse there.

In the "Baby Case", Menderes was accused of adultery with Aydan and killing the baby she gave birth to. She confessed her love by saying, "I love this man and he told me that my baby died during childbirth".

The "Baby Case" is the only case that resulted in acquittal in 13 cases. In the case of discretionary funds, it was understood that Adnan Menderes paid Ayhan Aydan's ex-husband at certain intervals. Menderes, the tenth Turkish Prime Minister, was executed by hanging by the coup soldiers.

Aydan's son died in London at the age of 18, poisoned by air. She did not comment on newspapers and magazines until the end of her life. She died on 19 February 2009 at noon in Çeşme district of İzmir.
