= Motion with four signatures =

Motion with four signatures (Turkish: Dörtlü takrir) was a motion given to the Grand National Assembly of Turkey in June 1945 by the quadrumvirate of Celâl Bayar, Refik Koraltan, Mehmet Fuat Köprülü and Adnan Menderes; all Republican People's Party (CHP) deputies at the time. By calling for widespread political liberalization, it posed the first significant open challenge to the existing one party system from inside CHP itself. Although the motion itself was denied, it is considered an important milestone in the parliamentary history of Turkey, as it kicked off the establishment of a multi-party political system in the country.

== Background ==
The Turkish Republic was proclaimed on 29 October 1923. However the Republican People's Party (CHP) was the only party in the parliament. Although two times opposition parties were founded (the Progressive Republican Party of 1924 and the Liberal Republican Party of 1930) with the go-ahead from Mustafa Kemal Atatürk himself, both projects proved to be short-lived. The Independent Group, an artificially formed opposition group in the CHP itself was ineffective. But towards the end of the Second World War, an intraparty opposition group started to take shape in CHP. The most notable member of this group was Celâl Bayar, a former prime minister who was known for his rivalry with İsmet İnönü, the President who took over after Atatürk.

In 1945, a law draft about land reform (titled "provision of land to farmers") caused a split in CHP. Many CHP deputies who were also land owners, strongly opposed this law. During these discussions Adnan Menderes, a young and lesser-known deputy from Aydın Province, who was also a large land owner back home, proved himself as an able debater.

During the budget negotiations on 21 May 1945, some deputies led by Bayar and including Menderes, criticized the fiscal policies of the government extensively, also going on to vote against the proposed budget a week later.

== The motion ==
On 12 June 1945, one day after the land reform law was passed, four CHP deputies submitted a motion about a renovation of the party regulations. This motion is known as The motion with four signatures. The co-signers were Celal Bayar, Adnan Menderes, Refik Koraltan and Fuat Köprülü. The motion emphasized that the Turkish nation was ready for democracy and wider political freedoms.

The actual intent behind the motion has been subject to debate. While it never mentioned a multi-party system and instead was calling for strictly intraparty reforms, many agree that the implicit meaning was the necessity of an opposition party. Hilmi Uran, the Minister of Internal Affairs at the time, later wrote in his memoirs that it was widely known that the submitters had already decided to found their own party. However, in an interview with the prominent journalist Abdi İpekçi in 1973, Bayar denied this:

I did not [intend to found a new party at the time]. I am speaking for myself of course, I cannot speak on the behalf of the others. We were aiming to turn the [Republican] People's Party into a normal party by strictly intraparty means.

The motion was rejected on the ground that the party was already taking steps towards a more democratic environment. This rejection brought the intraparty opposition into the open. The following days were marked by even harder rhetoric by both sides. Two of the signatories, Menderes and Köprülü, heavily criticized the decision, especially attacking the Prime Minister Şükrü Saracoğlu. As a result, both were expelled from the party on 21 September 1945 by a unanimous vote. Koraltan soon followed them. On 26 September 1945, Bayar resigned from the parliament in protest, but did not resign from the party until November of that year.

== Aftermath ==
On 7 January 1946 the four signatories founded the Democrat Party (DP). After the DP won the 1950 elections. Celal Bayar became president, Adnan Menderes prime minister, Refik Koraltan Parliament speaker and Fuat Köprülü became the Minister of Foreign Affairs.

== Gallery ==
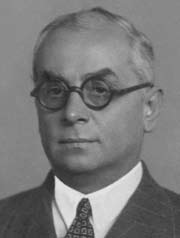
Celal Bayar

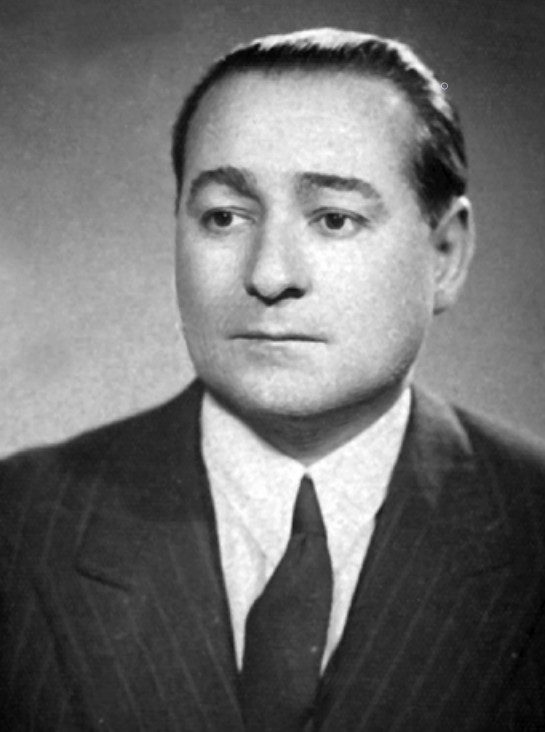
Adnan Menderes

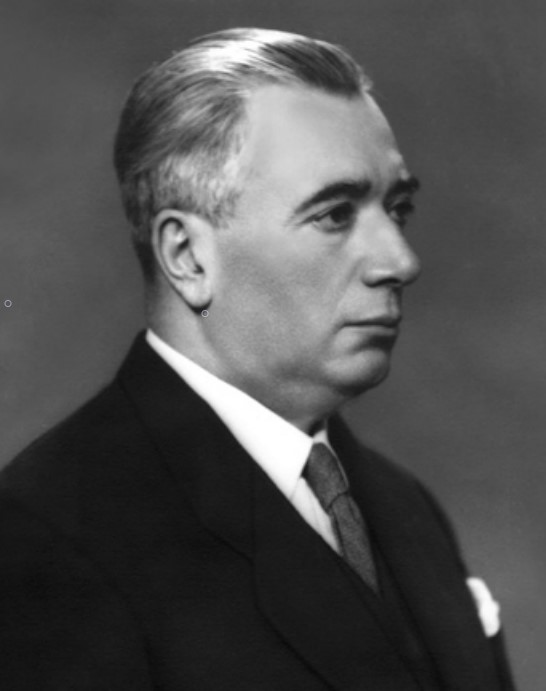
Refik Koraltan

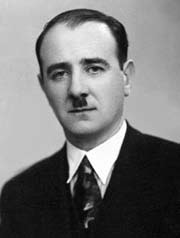
Fuat Köprülü
