= Gevheri =

Turkish poet

Gevheri Turkish: Gevherî was a Turkish folk poet who is estimated to have lived in the 17th century. In 1998, In the work titled "Gevherî Divanı", published by Şükrü Elçin, 945 poems of the poet included in the cönks and manuscripts were brought together.

== Biography ==
There is no definite information about the date of birth of Gevherî, who is one of the 17th century poets. Although many researchers, especially Fuad Köprülü, claim that Gevherî was born in the first half of the 17th century, based on some of his poems, the existence of those who do not agree with this view does not escape attention.

== Bibliography ==
=== Poems ===
- Beyaz Göğsün Bana Karşı
- Bir Elâ Gözlüden Şikayetim Var
- Bizden Selam Olsun Gül Yüzlü Yare
- Bugün Ben Bir Bağa Girdim
- Bugün Ben Bir Güzel Gördüm
- Bülbül Ne Yatarsın Yaz Bahar Oldu
- Dila Gör Bu Cihan İçre
- Ela Gözlerini Sevdiğim Dilber
- Ey Benim Nazlı Cananım
- Ey Peri Cihana Sen Gibi Dilber
- Garip Turna Bizi Senden Sorana
- Hey Ağalar Bir Sevdaya Uğradım
- Hey Ağalar Zaman Azdı
- Mecnun'a Dönmüşüm Bilmem Gezdiğim
- Sözün Bilmez Bazı Nadan Elinden
- Şunda Bir Dilbere Gönül Düşürdüm
- Bulunmaz
- Emanet Etmişsin Geldi Selamın
