= Ministry of Coordination =

Ministry of Coordination may also refer to:

- Ministry of Coordination (Turkey)
- Ministry of Coordination (Greece)

== See also ==
- Minister for Government Coordination (Sweden)
