= Celal Yardımcı =

Turkish lawyer and politician (1911–1986)

Personal details
- Born: Hüseyin Celal Yardımcı; 1911 Doğubeyazıt, Ottoman Empire
- Died: 10 January 1986 (aged 74–75) Istanbul, Turkey
- Resting place: Zincirlikuyu cemetery, Istanbul, Turkey
- Party: Democrat Party (1946–1960); Justice Party
- Children: 2
- Education: Istanbul University

Celal Yardımcı (1911–1986) was a Turkish politician who served as the minister of education and minister of justice in the 1950s. Being a member of the Democrat Party (DP) he was arrested and imprisoned following the military coup in 1960.

== Early life and education ==
He was born Hüseyin Celal in Doğubayazıt, Ağrı, in 1911. His parents divorced in 1929. He had seven siblings.

He graduated from Istanbul High School in 1928 and received a degree in law from Istanbul University in 1934. During his studies at Istanbul University he also took courses in French and Greek languages.

== Career and arrest ==
Yardımcı started his career working as a clerk at the Istanbul Courthouse. Then he worked as a lawyer and a journalist. He joined the Democrat Party. He was a member of the Parliament and represented Ağrı in the legislatures of the 9th, 10th and 11th between 1950 and 1960. He also served as the deputy speaker of the Parliament. He was appointed minister of state to the 20th cabinet and 22nd cabinet. His first term in office was between 8 April 1953 and 17 May 1954, and the second was from 9 December 1955 to 15 November 1957. In the 21st cabinet and 23rd cabinet he was the minister of education. Yardımcı served in the post from 17 May 1954 to 9 December 1955 and from 25 November 1957 to 22 May 1959. During his first term as the education minister Maarif Colleges were launched in 1955. These schools were one of the consequences of the improved relations between Turkey and the United States and provided English and Turkish courses.

Yardımcı was appointed minister of justice on 3 April 1960 when Esat Budakoğlu resigned from office. Yardımcı served in the 23rd cabinet until the military coup on 27 May 1960. All of the cabinets in which Yardımcı served were led by Prime Minister Adnan Menderes. Immediately after the coup Yardımcı was arrested and tried at the Yassıada court and sentenced to life imprisonment. During the trials lasted between 14 October 1960 and 15 September 1961 his lawyer was his sister, Mesude Varol. In the Yassıada prison he stayed in the same room with Fatin Rüştü Zorlu who was the minister of foreign affairs in the Menderes cabinets. Zorlu would be executed immediately after the trials on 16 September. Yardımcı was first jailed in Kayseri and then in Istanbul and Ankara.

Yardımcı was released from the prison in January 1965 when he was pardoned by the President Cemal Gürsel due to his health problems. Then Yardımcı worked as a freelance lawyer. When former DP politicians were permitted to join political parties in 1975 Yardımcı became a member of the Justice Party headed by Süleyman Demirel and was elected as a deputy from Istanbul serving in the 16th legislature.

== Personal life and death ==
Yardımcı was married to Harika Yardımcı and had two children. He died in Istanbul on 10 January 1986 and was buried in Zincirlikuyu cemetery.
