= Medeni Berk =

Turkish banker and politician (1913–1994)

Minister of State; Deputy Prime Minister
- In office 1959 – 27 May 1960
- Prime Minister: Adnan Menderes

Minister of Public Works
- In office 1957–1959
- Prime Minister: Adnan Menderes

Personal details
- Born: 1913 Medina, Ottoman Empire
- Died: 16 March 1994 (aged 80–81) İstanbul, Turkey
- Resting place: Edirnekapı cemetery, İstanbul
- Party: Democrat Party
- Children: 1
- Education: Marmara University

Medeni Berk (1913–1994) was a Turkish banker and politician who held several cabinet posts from 1957 to 1960 in the cabinets led by Prime Minister Adnan Menderes.

== Early life and education ==
He was born in Medina, Ottoman Arabia, in 1913 when his father was serving there as a military officer in the Ottoman Army. His parents were from Aksaray.

He completed his primary and secondary education in İzmir. He attended a high school in Istanbul and then graduated from the business and commerce school, precursor of Marmara University, in 1936.

== Career and activities ==
Following his graduation, Berk worked as an inspector at the state-owned Ziraat Bank where he also served as general director. He became the general director of a cooperation, Tariş, in 1950. Next year, he was appointed general director of another state-owned finance institution, Turkish Real Estate Credit Bank.

Berk's political career began in 1957 when he was elected as a deputy from Niğde for the ruling Democrat Party in the by-elections. He was part of the progressive group within the party along with President Celâl Bayar and Refik Koraltan. Berk was appointed minister of public works in 1957 which he held until 1959. Next, he was named as the minister of state and deputy prime minister in 1959 and was in office until 27 May 1960 when the Menderes government was overthrown through a military coup.

Berk was very influential in the resignation of Vehbi Koç, a leading businessman, from the Republican People's Party. In January 1959 while serving as minister of public work Berk told Koç that if he would not join the Democrat Party, it would be very difficult for him to take out a loan from the state banks. Koç left the Republican People's Party on 10 March 1960, but did not join the Democrat Party.

Berk was one of the Democrat Party politicians who served as the president of Fenerbahçe S.K. between 1959 and 27 May 1960, during the rule of the Democratic Party from 1950 to 1960.

== Arrest and later years ==
Berk was arrested immediately after the coup and tried by the Supreme Court of Justice in Yassıada. He was sentenced to life imprisonment. However, he was released from prison in 1964 when an amnesty was granted. Berk was a board member of the private bank Akbank and later served as its general director. He was also the chairman of the Turkish Union of Chambers of Commerce and Industry between 5 January 1970 and 30 May 1971.

== Personal life and death ==
Berk married twice and had a daughter from his first marriage. He died in İstanbul on 16 March 1994 and was buried at Edirnekapı cemetery.
