= List of deputy prime ministers of Turkey =

This is a chronological list of deputy prime ministers of governments of the Republic of Turkey. Deputy Prime Minister was an office under the prime ministry between 1946 and 2018. Not all cabinets had the post of deputy prime minister. The political party of the deputy prime minister is affixed to his name when it differed from the prime minister's party as it was the case in coalition governments. Deputy Prime Minister of Turkey abolished together with the Prime Ministry's in 2018.

Key:	CHP	DP	AP	ANAP	DYP	RP	DSP	AK Party	Other

Cabinet No.	Deputy Prime Minister	Cabinet of	Took office	Left office
15	Mümtaz Ökmen	Mehmet Recep Peker	7 August 1946	10 September 1947
16	Faik Ahmet Barutçu	Hasan Saka	10 September 1947	10 June 1948
17	Faik Ahmet Barutçu	Hasan Saka	10 June 1948	16 January 1949
18	Nihat Erim	Şemsettin Günaltay	16 January 1949	22 May 1950
19	Samet Ağaoğlu	Adnan Menderes	22 May 1950	9 March 1951
20	Fethi Çelikbaş, Samet Ağaoğlu	Adnan Menderes	9 March 1951	17 May 1954
21	Fatin Rüştü Zorlu, Fuat Köprülü	Adnan Menderes	17 May 1954	9 December 1955
23	Medeni Berk, Ahmet Tevfik İleri	Adnan Menderes	25 November 1957	27 May 1960
24	Fahri Özdilek	Cemal Gürsel	30 May 1960	5 January 1961
25	Fahri Özdilek; Muharrem İhsan Kızıloğlu	Cemal Gürsel	5 January 1961	20 November 1961
26	Ali Akif Eyidoğan (AP)	İsmet İnönü	20 November 1961	25 June 1962
27	Hasan Dinçer (CKMP), Ekrem Alican(YTP), Turhan Feyzioğlu	İsmet İnönü	25 June 1962	25 December 1963
28	Kemal Satır	İsmet İnönü	25 December 1963	20 February 1965
29	Süleyman Demirel (AP)	Suat Hayri Ürgüplü	20 February 1965	27 October 1965
33	Sadi Koçaş, Atilla Karaosmanoğlu	Nihat Erim	26 March 1971	11 December 1971
36	Kemal Satır (CP), Nizamettin Erkmen	Naim Talu	15 April 1973	26 January 1974
37	Necmettin Erbakan (MSP)	Bülent Ecevit	26 January 1974	17 November 1974
38	Zeyyat Baykara	Sadi Irmak	17 November 1974	31 March 1975
39	Alparslan Türkeş (MHP), Turhan Feyzioğlu (CGP), Necmettin Erbakan (MSP)	Süleyman Demirel	31 March 1975	21 June 1977
40	Turan Güneş, Orhan Eyüpoğlu	Bülent Ecevit	21 June 1977	21 July 1977
41	Necmettin Erbakan (MSP), Alparslan Türkeş (MHP)	Süleyman Demirel	21 July 1977	5 January 1978
42	Orhan Eyüpoğlu, Hikmet Çetin, Turhan Feyzioğlu, Faruk Sükan	Bülent Ecevit	5 January 1978	12 November 1979
44	Turgut Özal, Zeyyat Baykara	Bülent Ulusu	21 September 1980	13 December 1983
45	Kaya Erdem	Turgut Özal	13 December 1983	21 December 1987
46	Kaya Erdem, Ali Bozer	Turgut Özal	21 December 1987	9 November 1989
47	Ali Bozer	Yıldırım Akbulut	9 November 1989	23 June 1991
48	Ekrem Pakdemirli	Mesut Yılmaz	23 June 1991	20 November 1991
49	Erdal İnönü (SHP)	Süleyman Demirel	20 November 1991	25 June 1993
50	Erdal İnönü (SHP), Murat Karayalçın (SHP), Hikmet Çetin (CHP)	Tansu Çiller	25 June 1993	5 October 1995
51	Necmettin Cevheri (DYP)	Tansu Çiller	5 October 1995	30 October 1995
52	Deniz Baykal (CHP)	Tansu Çiller	30 October 1995	6 March 1996
53	Nahit Menteşe (DYP)	Mesut Yılmaz	6 March 1996	28 June 1996
54	Tansu Çiller (DYP)	Necmettin Erbakan	28 June 1996	30 June 1997
55	İsmet Sezgin (DTP)	Mesut Yılmaz	30 June 1997	11 January 1999
56	Hüsamettin Özkan, Hikmet Uluğbay	Bülent Ecevit	11 January 1999	28 May 1999
57	Cumhur Ersümer, Hüsamettin Özkan (DSP), Devlet Bahçeli (MHP), Mesut Yılmaz (ANAP)	Bülent Ecevit	28 May 1999	18 November 2002
58	Mehmet Ali Şahin, Ertuğrul Yalçınbayır, Abdüllatif Şener	Abdullah Gül	18 November 2002	14 March 2003
59	Abdullah Gül	Recep Tayyip Erdoğan	14 March 2003	29 August 2007
60	Cemil Çiçek, Hayati Yazıcı (→) Bülent Arınç, Nazım Ekren (→) Ali Babacan	Recep Tayyip Erdoğan	29 August 2007 (→) 1 May 2009	14 July 2011
61	Beşir Atalay, Ali Babacan, Bülent Arınç, Bekir Bozdağ (→) Emrullah İşler	Recep Tayyip Erdoğan	14 July 2011 (→) 25 December 2013	29 August 2014
62	Bülent Arınç, Ali Babacan, Numan Kurtulmuş, Yalçın Akdoğan	Ahmet Davutoğlu	29 August 2014	28 August 2015
63	Yalçın Akdoğan, Numan Kurtulmuş, Cevdet Yılmaz, Tuğrul Türkeş	Ahmet Davutoğlu	29 August 2015	17 November 2015
64	Yalçın Akdoğan, Numan Kurtulmuş, Lütfi Elvan, Tuğrul Türkeş, Mehmet Şimşek	Ahmet Davutoğlu	24 November 2015	24 May 2016
65	Nurettin Canikli (2016–17), Numan Kurtulmuş (2016–17), Veysi Kaynak (2016–17), Tuğrul Türkeş (2016–17), Recep Akdağ (2017– 2018); Mehmet Şimşek (2016-2018), Bekir Bozdağ (2017– 2018), Hakan Çavuşoğlu (2017– 2018), Fikri Işık (2017– 2018)	Binali Yıldırım	24 May 2016	9 July 2018

Key:	CHP	DP	AP	ANAP	DYP	RP	DSP	AK Party	Other

== See also ==
- List of prime ministers of Turkey
