= Arif Demirer =

Turkish politician (1909–1995)

Member of Parliament for Afyonkarahisar
- In office 2 May 1954 – 27 May 1960

Minister of Transport (Menderes IV)
- In office 1955–1957

Personal details
- Born: Mehmet Arif Demirer; 1909
- Died: 10 July 1995 (aged 85–86)
- Party: Democrat Party
- Education: Istanbul University

Mehmet Arif Demirer (1909 – 10 July 1995) was a Turkish politician of the Democrat Party. He sat as a member ('Deputy') of the 10th and 11th Grand National Assemblies in the 1950s representing the Afyonkarahisar electoral district. He also represented Turkey in the Parliamentary Assembly of the Council of Europe in 1954–1955.

He served as minister of transport in the 4th Menderes government of 1955–1957.

He had graduated from the law faculty of Istanbul University, and later studied economics at universities in Berlin and Munich.

Outside of politics, Demirer served as the general manager of the Turkish national post and telegraph directorate PTT, and also as the chairman of the national flag carrier, Turkish Airlines, which he had earlier, in his role as the minister of transport, restructured and spun out of a public utility into a standalone joint-stock company (Anonim Ortaklığı).

He was one of the passengers in the 1959 Turkish Airlines crash at Gatwick, in which more than half of those onboard died but he survived with injuries.
