= 1959 Gatwick Turkish Airlines Viscount crash =

Fatal aviation accident

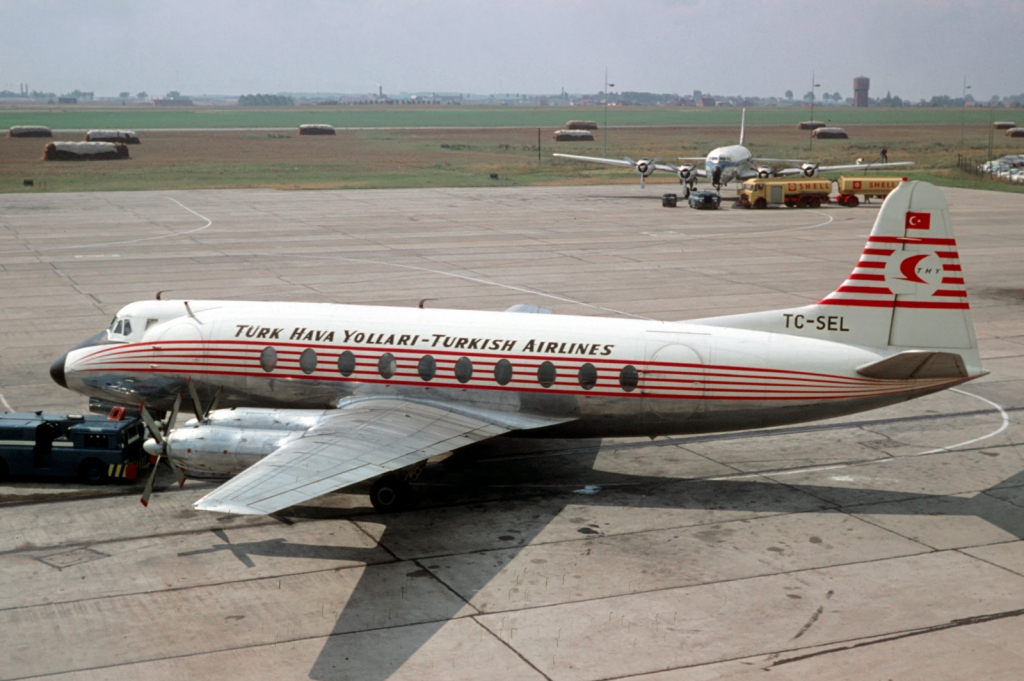
- A Turkish Airlines Viscount 700 similar to the accident aircraft

Accident
- Date: 17 February 1959
- Summary: CFIT due to weather conditions
- Site: Jordan's Wood, Newdigate, Surrey, England; 51°08′25″N 000°16′27″W

Aircraft
- Aircraft type: Vickers Viscount 793
- Operator: Turkish Airlines
- Registration: TC-SEV
- Flight origin: Esenboğa International Airport Ankara, Turkey
- Stopover: Atatürk International Airport Istanbul, Turkey
- Last stopover: Ciampino Airport Rome, Italy
- Destination: London Heathrow Airport, United Kingdom (diverted to London Gatwick Airport due to fog at Heathrow)
- Passengers: 16
- Crew: 8
- Fatalities: 14
- Injuries: 9
- Survivors: 10

On 17 February 1959, a Turkish Airlines Vickers Viscount Type 793 (registration TC-SEV) on an international charter flight from Esenboğa International Airport in Ankara, Turkey, to London Heathrow Airport diverted to London Gatwick Airport, United Kingdom due to heavy fog. It was carrying the Turkish prime minister, Adnan Menderes, and a party of government officials. The Viscount crashed in a wood 3 miles (4.8 km) from the threshold of Gatwick runway during its final approach to land in extensive fog. Five of the eight crew and nine of the 16 passengers died in the crash. The prime minister was among the ten survivors.

== Flight ==
Turkish Prime Minister Adnan Menderes, accompanied by a Turkish delegation, was on his way to the British capital to sign the London Agreement on the Cyprus issue with British Prime Minister Harold Macmillan and Greek Prime Minister Constantine Karamanlis, which gave the three sides the right to intervene in Cyprus in case peace was broken by any of the parties.

The special flight departed from Ankara Esenboğa International Airport bound for London Heathrow Airport via Istanbul Atatürk International Airport (IATA: IST, ICAO: LTBA) and Rome Ciampino Airport (IATA: CIA, ICAO: LIRA). The aircraft left its last stopover, Rome, at 13:02 hrs and called London Airways at 15:56 hrs over Abbeville, just before leaving French airspace. TC-SEV was cleared by air traffic control to the Epsom Radio Range station, the holding fix for London Airport. Over Epsom range at 16:21 hrs, the Turkish Airlines captain was instructed by the London Airport Commandant to divert to Gatwick due to poor visibility at Heathrow.

Location of airports on the flight route

== Accident ==
TC-SEV, cruising at 6,000 feet (1,800 m), left Epsom at 16:27 hrs for Mayfield, East Sussex, the holding point for Gatwick. The airport's approach control informed the pilot that it would be positioned by radar for an ILS approach to the easterly Runway 08R.

The latest actual weather conditions observed at Gatwick Airport were surface wind calm, visibility 1,800 yards (1,600 m), mist, no low cloud, and shallow ground fog patches of only 1 foot (0.30 m) to 5 feet (1.5 m) in depth.

The weather reported to the aircraft was "surface wind calm, visibility one decimal one nautical miles, mist, three oktas at eight hundred feet, the QFE one zero three six", which was acknowledged by the pilot.

At 16:34 hrs, the pilot was instructed to descend to a holding pattern at 4,000 feet (1,200 m) on reaching Mayfield NDB and to steer a course of 280 degrees and then to continue to descend to 2,000 feet (610 m).

Turned on to the ILS approach path, TC-SEV overshot the centre line slightly. At 5 nautical miles (9.3 km) from touchdown, the aircraft affirmed that it could continue on the ILS. At 16:38 hrs, the captain was requested a change to tower frequency and this was acknowledged. It was the last communication with the aircraft.

The aircraft was visible along the approach path centre line on the radar screen towards the runway until it disappeared about 3 nautical miles (5.6 km) from the threshold. It was assumed that the aircraft had crashed since no reply was received to radio calls to the aircraft.

The aircraft had flown into the top of trees 390 feet (120 m) AMSL at the edge of Jordan's Wood east of the Newdigate-Rusper road on a heading parallel to the approach path to Runway 08R at Gatwick. The aircraft lost its wings and had its engines torn off as it descended at an angle of about 6 degrees from the horizontal 300 yards (270 m) through the woods, and touched the ground with its wheels. After rising again slightly the main part of the wreckage landed upside down with trees embedded in the mangled fuselage about 100 yards (91 m) further on, after which it caught fire. The rear part of the fuselage came to rest upside down and remained untouched by fire. Shortly after, an explosion occurred in the main fuselage.

The accident site was located 2.8 nautical miles (5.2 km) from the runway threshold and 550 feet (170 m) to the north of the approach path centre line.

This was the first air disaster in which Turkish Airlines was involved.

== Rescue operations ==
Gatwick Airport alerted the local fire and rescue services, and soon it was confirmed that the aircraft had crashed in the area in which it had disappeared from the radar screen.

Peter Weller, a gardener at the Newdigate Chaffold farm, and his two colleagues noticed the crash. He asked one of his friends to ride on a bike to the next police station to report the accident. He and his other friend rushed to the scene and tried to rescue the victims. Shortly after 17:00 hrs another local resident, Margaret Bailey, who was a trained nurse, and her husband Tony were at the crash site.

The resulting fire was put out by three divisions of Surrey Fire Brigade, despite thick fog.

== Turkish prime minister's survival ==
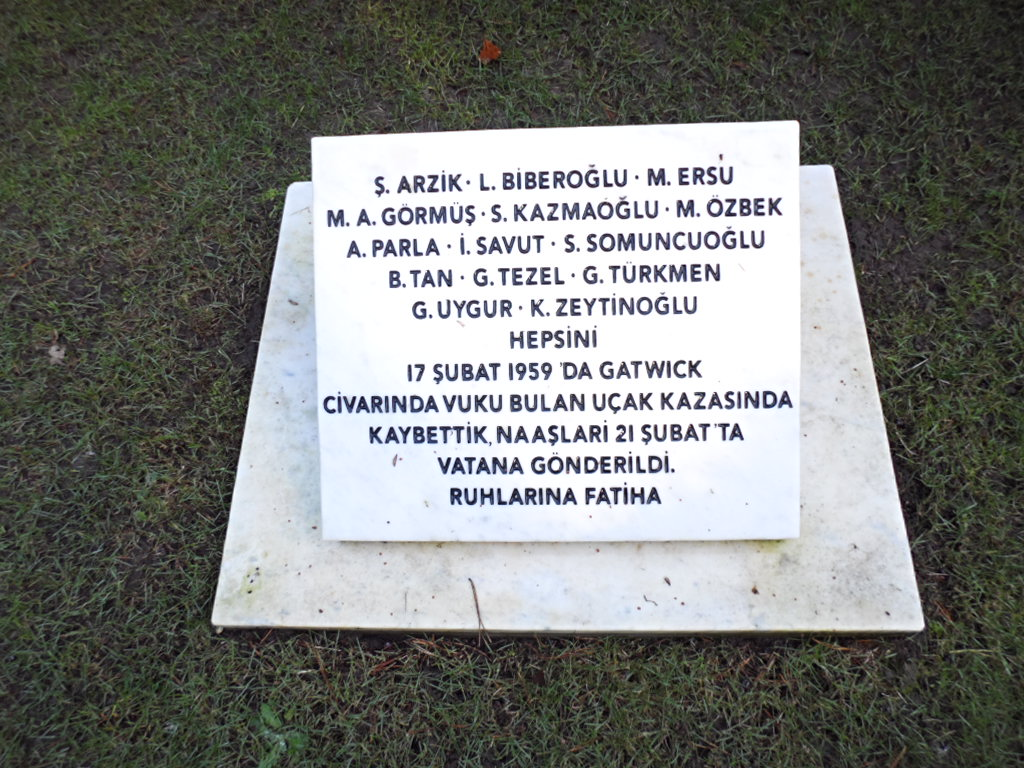
The memorial to the victims in the Turkish Airforce plot at Brookwood Cemetery

Turkish Premier Adnan Menderes, who was seated at a left window seat in the rear passenger cabin, survived the crash with only light scratches to his face, hanging in an upside-down position with his foot stuck in the floor. He was helped by Rıfat Kadızade, who freed his foot and unbuckled his safety belt. He was then taken out of the wreckage by Kadızade and Şefik Fenmen. Another survivor, Melih Esenbel, joined the group outside.

While Tony Bailey was engaged in helping the other victims, his wife took Menderes and two other survivors by car to her farmhouse 200 yards (180 m) away and gave first aid. Menderes was transferred to The London Clinic 90 minutes later. He signed the London Agreement on 19 February 1959, in the hospital. He returned home on 26 February 1959, and was welcomed by his archrival İsmet İnönü and a huge crowd.

Other casualties were treated at hospitals in East Grinstead, Redhill and Dorking. The bodies of the victims were transferred to Turkey and buried on 22 February 1959. A memorial to the victims is located in the Turkish Airforce plot at Brookwood Cemetery in Surrey.

== Crash investigation ==
The following facts were ascertained:

1. The aircraft had a valid Certificate of Airworthiness and was properly maintained.
2. The all-up weight and trim of the aircraft were within the prescribed limits.
3. The crew was properly licensed.
4. There was no pre-crash malfunctioning of the aircraft, its engines or its equipment.
5. All the ground facilities were serviceable and functioning correctly.

The investigation concluded that:

the evidence was insufficient to establish the cause of the accident. There was no indication however that this can be associated either with a technical failure of the aircraft or with a failure of the ground services.

An aftercast of the probable weather conditions on the approach to Gatwick from 10 miles (16 km) west to the threshold of Runway 09 was surface wind calm or light westerly and the ground almost entirely covered with fog from the western limit of the area under consideration to about 2.5 miles (4.0 km)-3 miles (4.8 km) from the threshold of runway. The top of the fog was about 650 feet (200 m) to 700 feet (210 m) and the visibility within it varied from about 30 yards (27 m) to 200 yards (180 m) possible with few transient isolated breaks. From the eastern edge of the fog belt to Gatwick, there was mist and haze with visibility 1,500 yards (1,400 m)-2,000 yards (1,800 m) and little or no low cloud.

== Aircraft ==
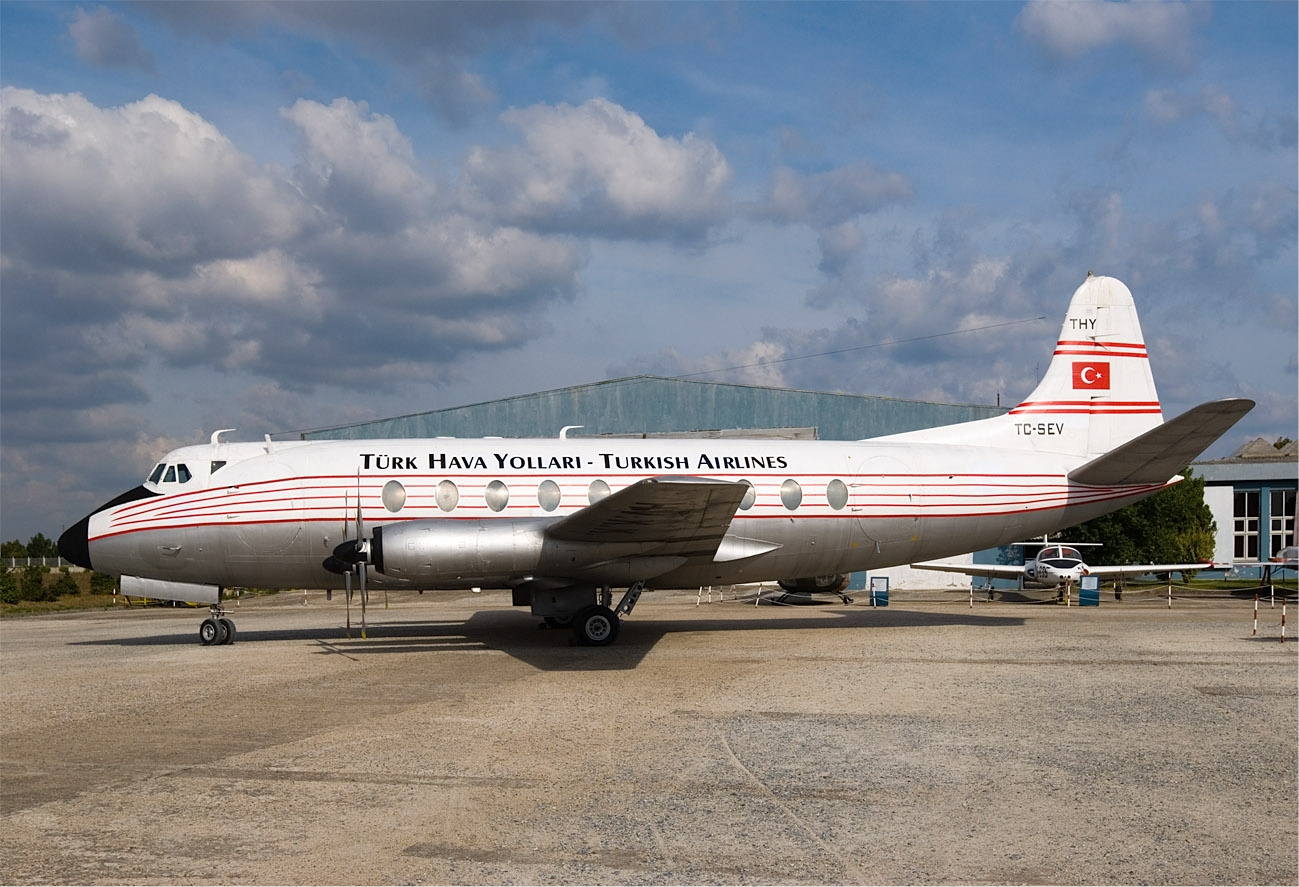
Vickers Viscount painted in THY livery for a movie.

The aircraft, a Vickers Viscount Type 793 with four Rolls-Royce Dart 510 turboprop engines, was built by Vickers-Armstrongs (Aircraft) Ltd and completed in 1958 with serial number 429.

A United Kingdom Certificate of Airworthiness was issued on 25 July 1958, valid for one year, and a Certificate of Validation for the same period was issued by the Civil Aviation Department of the Turkish Ministry of Communications. The aircraft was registered in the name of Turkish Airlines Incorporated.

The airframe had a total flight time of 548 hours and the engines had each run approximately 615 hours since manufacture. The Turkish authorities certified after examining the appropriate records and log books in Turkey that the maintenance had been properly carried out. Examination of the translated extracts from these documents showed no record of any defect, which might have affected the accident. It was noted that no inspections of the ILS equipment in the aircraft had been carried out.

At the time of the accident, the weight of the aircraft was below the permissible maximum for landing. It was not possible to check the trim but there was no reason to believe that it was not within the prescribed limits.

== Crew and passengers ==
The eight crew consisted of three pilots, one navigator, one mechanic and three flight attendants, of whom five lost their lives.

- Münir Ozbek, Captain (38) – (in command) – killed
- Lütfi Biberoglu, Captain (35) – (second pilot) – killed
- Sabri Kazmaoglu, Captain (35) – (reserve pilot) – killed
- Gündüz Tezel, Captain (42) – (navigator) – killed
- Türkay Erkay – (steward) – seriously injured
- Gönül Uygur – (stewardess) – killed
- Yurdanur Yelkovan – (stewardess) – seriously injured
- Kemal Itık – (supernumerary mechanic) – uninjured

There were officially sixteen passengers on board, of which nine died at the accident. However, the list of names that appeared in the news included a total of seventeen passengers.

- Adnan Menderes (Prime minister) – uninjured
- Server Somuncuoğlu (Press, Media and Tourism Minister) – killed
- Muzaffer Ersü (Private secretary of Prime minister) – killed
- Şefik Fenmen (Deputy private secretary of Prime minister) – lightly injured
- Melih Esenbel (Secretary General of Foreign Ministry) – lightly injured
- İlhan Savut (Head of 2nd Department of Foreign Ministry) – killed
- Mehmet Ali Görmüş (Private secretary of Press, Media and Tourism Minister) – killed
- Sedat Görmüş (Secretary of Foreign Minister) – killed
- Güner Türkmen (Secretary of Foreign Minister) – killed
- Arif Demirer (Deputy of Afyonkarahisar Province) – injured
- Emin Kalafat (Deputy of Çanakkale Province) – injured
- Kemal Zeytinoğlu (Deputy of Eskişehir Province, former Public Works Minister) – killed
- Rıfat Kadıoğlu (Deputy of Sakarya Province) – injured
- Abdullah Parla (general manager of Turkish Airlines) – killed
- Şerif Arzık (general manager of Anadolu News Agency) – killed
- Burhan Tan (Photo reporter of Newspaper Akşam) – killed
- Kazım Nefes (Police bodyguard) – injured

== TC-SEV replica ==
Turkish Airlines restored a Viscount 794D, manufacturer serial number 430, registration TC-SEL, which served as a VIP aircraft for the Turkish Air Force before being withdrawn from use in 1990. After changing the call sign to TC-SEV and repainting the livery to the original red-and-white striped pajamas design, the airframe was put on display in the Military Aviation Museum in Yeşilköy, Istanbul.

== Film and television ==
The air crash in Gatwick was the subject for a documentary television film featuring the replica Viscount 794D.

A historical and romantic television series titled Hatırla Sevgili (Remember Darling) on the Turkish ATV channel also depicts the events around the accident and the survival of Menderes, again featuring the replica aircraft.
