= Yassıada trials =

Trials in Turkey

The Yassıada Trials were a series of criminal cases in Turkey brought by the military regime against politicians of the formerly ruling Democrat Party. Following the coup which removed the Democrats from power on May 27, 1960, the military junta known as the National Unity Committee (MBK) established a special court to try the politicians who had been removed. These trials were held in the prison of Yassıada (later renamed "Island of Democracy and Freedom"). The trials began on 14 October 1960 and ended on 15 September 1961. They resulted in the execution of the former prime minister Adnan Menderes and two of his ministers.

== Background ==
Former President Celal Bayar, former Prime Minister Adnan Menderes and others arrested after the coup were imprisoned in Yassıada in the Sea of Marmara. A law passed on June 12, 1960, established a Supreme Court of Justice to try the prisoners. A High Investigation Board was also established to investigate the culpability of the defendants and to decide whether they should be handed over to the Supreme Court of Justice. Decisions of the Supreme Court of Justice were to be final, with no possibility of appeal or reprieve, but any death sentences were to be carried out by the National Unity Committee (MBK) and subject to its approval. On October 6, 1960 tr:Salim Başol, head of the 1st Criminal Division of the Supreme Court of Appeals, was appointed as the head of the Supreme Court of Justice, and de:Ömer Altay Egesel, a member of the Supreme Investigation Board, was appointed chief prosecutor.

The Yassiada trials were the first case in the history of Turkey in which a president was sent to trial. The 1924 Constitution provided that "The President can only be tried for treason". For this reason Celal Bayar was tried for treason under Article 146 of the Turkish Penal Code, while a range of charges was brought against other defendants.

The trials began on 14 October 1960. Charges were brought against 592 defendants, including former President Celâl Bayar, former prime minister Adnan Menderes, members of his cabinet, the Speaker and Deputy Speaker of the Grand National Assembly of Turkey, 395 Assembly members and former Chief of General Staff tr:Rüştü Erdelhun. They were all charged with violating the constitution and other crimes. Individual cases were heard in dedicated sessions of the court from October 1960 to September 1961. A total of 872 sessions took place on 203 trial days. The public prosecutor's office requested death sentences 228 times.

== Individual cases ==
=== Dog Case (October 14, 1960 – October 24, 1960) ===
The King of Afghanistan had given Celal Bayar a very valuable Afghan Hound. For a while it was looked after at the State Farm. Later, Celâl Bayar had the dog sold to Atatürk Forest Farm and Zoo for 20,000 liras and used the money to pay for a fountain in Mursallı, in the Ödemiş district of İzmir. President Celâl Bayar and Minister of Agriculture Nedim Ökmen were convicted of abusing their influence and authority and making this sale for their own personal gain.

=== Istanbul Pogrom Case (20 October 1960 – 5 January 1961) ===
The second charge was that, while in power, the Democrat Party had caused the anti-Greek pogrom in Istanbul on 6–7 September 1955. Celâl Bayar, Adnan Menderes, Fatin Rüştü Zorlu, Mehmet Fuad Köprülü, Istanbul Governor Fahrettin Kerim Gökay, Istanbul Police Chief Alaaddin Eriş, İzmir Governor Kemal Hadımlı, Thessaloniki Consul General Mehmet Ali Balin and others were charged with planting a bomb at the house of Mustafa Kemal Atatürk in Thessaloniki, blaming Turkey's Greek minority for the crime and then organising the burning of their houses. Adnan Menderes, Fatin Rüştü Zorlu and İzmir Governor Kemal Hadımlı were convicted, while the other defendants were acquitted.

=== Baby Case (October 31, 1960 – November 22, 1960) ===
Adnan Menderes was accused of arranging with Dr. Fahri Atabay, Chief Physician of the Zeynep Kamil Hospital, to have a baby killed that he had just fathered with his mistress, Ayhan Aydan. Both were acquitted.

=== Vinyleks Company Case (4 November 1960 – 26 November 1960) ===
The former Minister of Finance, Hasan Polatkan was accused of providing illegal loans from Türkiye Vakıflar Bankası (founded by Adnan Menderes) to Vinyleks and receiving a bribe of 110,000 liras in return. His defense argued that the company, which manufactured artificial leather for import substitution, was profitable; as a matter of fact, the new bank management, installed after the coup, had given additional loans to the same company, doubling its credit limit. Despite this, this court found Menderes and Polatkan guilty. Polatkan was sentenced to 7 years in prison and banned from public service and company officials were also convicted.

=== Fraud Case (8 November 1960 – 3 December 1960) ===
Former ministers Hayrettin Erkmen and tr:Zeyyat Mandalinci were tried for not giving back foreign currency left over from their trip to the USA. Both ministers were acquitted.

=== Land Case (8 November 1960 – 26 November 1960) ===
Agriculture Minister tr:Nedim Ökmen was tried and convicted for forcing the government to buy land belonging to his wife at exorbitant prices.

=== Ali İpar Case (15 November 1960 – 19 January 1961) ===
In this case, Adnan Menderes, Fatin Rüştü Zorlu, Hasan Polatkan, Medeni Berk, Hayrettin Erkmen and shipowner Ali İpar, owner of İpar Transport, were tried and convicted for violating the foreign exchange law.

=== The Mill Case (November 18, 1960 – December 3, 1960) ===
Minister of Commerce tr:İbrahim Sıtkı Yırcalı was charged with using corrupt loans. The case was dropped due to the statute of limitations.

=== Barbara Case (November 21, 1960 – December 20, 1960) ===
Hasan Polatkan and Refik Koraltan were tried and convicted on the charge that Refik Koraltan violated the Foreign Exchange Law by bringing in a German maid and allocating foreign currency to her.

=== Concealed Appropriations Case (November 25, 1960 – February 2, 1961) ===
Adnan Menderes and his Undersecretary tr:Ahmet Salih Korur were tried and convicted for using the Prime Ministry's budget for illegal purposes.

=== Radio Case (29 November 1960 – 26 December 1960) ===
Adnan Menderes and seven former ministers were tried and convicted on the charge of "partisan use of the state radio for political purposes, denying the opposition the right to use the radio and thus violating the constitution".

=== Topkapı Events Case (2 December 1960 – 17 April 1961) ===
Opposition leader İsmet İnönü came to Istanbul on May 4, 1959, but his way from Yeşilköy Airport to Topkapi in the city centre was blocked by traffic wardens and he was then attacked by rioters. The police and soldiers did not intervene. However, thanks to Major Kenan Bayraktar, some soldiers intervened and İnönü was saved. A total of 60 defendants, consisting of Celal Bayar, Adnan Menderes, ministers and deputies, were tried on the charge of "provoking the public with the aim of plotting an assassination against İsmet İnönü in Topkapı on May 4, 1959 ". A total of 17 defendants, including Celâl Bayar and Adnan Menderes, were convicted and 43 defendants were acquitted.

=== Çanakkale Incident Case (27 December 1960 – 10 March 1961) ===
Adnan Menderes and three former ministers were tried and convicted on the charge of "preventing the freedom of movement of two CHP deputies" following the Geyikli Incidents.

=== Kayseri Incident Case (9 January 1961 – 20 April 1961) ===
The train of İsmet İnönü, who was travelling to Kayseri on April 2, 1960, was stopped by the order of the governor Ahmet Kınık. Major Selahattin Çetiner, who was given an order to stop the train and keep it at Himmet Dede Railway Station, nevertheless allowed it to proceed. Eight of the 13 defendants who were tried for the crime of "preventing the freedom of movement of CHP Chairman İsmet İnönü" were acquitted, and 5 defendants, including Celâl Bayar and Adnan Menderes, were convicted.

=== Democrat Izmir Case (12 January 1961 – 5 May 1961) ===
Eight of the 24 defendants who were tried for the crime of "inciting the public to destroy the printing house of the Demokrat İzmir newspaper on May 2, 1959" were acquitted, and 16 defendants, including Adnan Menderes, were convicted.

=== University Incidents Case (February 2, 1961 – July 27, 1961) ===
Student protests took place in Istanbul on 28 April and in Ankara on 29 April 1960. Approximately 40 students were injured in the events that broke out in Istanbul and Turan Emeksiz, a student of Istanbul University Faculty of Forestry, was killed by a police bullet of the police. 118 defendants were tried in this case. In addition to Democrat Party ministers, some members of the Armed Forces and Police officers were also accused. 84 of the 118 defendants who were tried for the crime of unlawfully raiding the university, opening fire on the public and declaring martial law against the law were convicted and 34 of them were acquitted.

=== Expropriation Case (April 17, 1961 – June 21, 1961) ===
Adnan Menderes and 9 former civil servants were prosecuted in Istanbul for allegedly expropriating the property of many citizens without paying the full price. Adnan Menderes was convicted in this case.

=== Fatherland Front Trial (27 April 1961 – 5 September 1961) ===
22 people from the Democrat Party leadership were charged with establishing the "Fatherland Front and using this organization as a tool for domination of one class over another". 19 defendants, including Celal Bayar and Adnan Menderes, were convicted and 3 defendants were acquitted.

=== Constitutional Violation Case (May 11, 1961 – September 5, 1961) ===
This case fell within the scope of crimes committed against the constitution, which is regulated under Article 146 of the Turkish Penal Code. The accusation was based on how the defendants had voted in parliament on the adoption of laws which were regarded by the military junta and its courts as unconstitutional. The basis of this case was in conflict with the principle of parliamentary immunity provided for in Article 17 of the 1924 Constitution.

There were 8 accusations of violating Article 146 of the Turkish Penal Code:

- Confiscation of the properties of the Republican People's Party in 1951 and 1953
- Kırşehir Province was downgraded to a district in 1954 since it voted for the opposition Republican Villagers Nation Party, as punishment for the political beliefs of its people
- Violation of the independence of the judiciary by enacting a law in 1953 that gave the government the right to retire judges who had completed 25 years of service;
- In 1954 and 1957, the Election Law was amended undemocratically,
- In 1956, laws restricting meetings and demonstrations were passed,
- Establishment of the Investigation Commission in 1960 with malicious intent,
- Giving extraordinary powers to the Investigation Commission,
- Attempting to abrogate and abolish the constitution with the extraordinary powers given to the Investigation Commission.

Based on this crime, the court ruled that some of the defendants should be executed and some should be sentenced to life or hard imprisonment.

== Sentences ==
On September 15, 1961, the verdicts were announced. 123 out of 592 defendants were acquitted. The charges against 5 were dropped. 15 defendants were sentenced to death and 31 to life imprisonment. Various prison sentences were given to the remaining 418 defendants. Those sentenced to death were: Celal Bayar, Adnan Menderes, Refik Koraltan, Fatin Rüştü Zorlu, Hasan Polatkan, tr:Emin Kalafat, tr:Agah Erozan, tr:Ahmet Hamdi Sancar, tr:Bahadır Dülger, Baha Akşit, tr:İbrahim Kirazoğlu, tr:Nusret Kirişçioğlu, tr:Zeki Erataman, tr:Osman Kavrakoğlu and tr:Rustu Erdelhun.

The sentences of the 395 accused former deputies, including the Former President, Prime Minister, Speaker of the Parliament and Ministers, were as follows:

- Death: 14
- Life sentence: 29
- 20 years: 1
- 15 years: 3
- 10 years: 17
- 8 years: 2
- 7 years: 7
- 6 years: 15
- 5 years: 96
- 4 years 2 months: 143
- Acquitted: 47

The National Unity Committee approved the 15 death sentences related to Celal Bayar, Adnan Menderes, Fatin Rüştü Zorlu and Hasan Polatkan. However, Celâl Bayar's sentence was commuted to life imprisonment because he was over 65 years old. The sentences of death for Fatin Rüştü Zorlu and Hasan Polatkan were carried out on September 16, 1961, and the sentence on Adnan Menderes on September 17, 1961 on İmralı island.

== National Unity Committee votes on the death penalty ==
Yes: 13, No: 9

#	Name	Vote
1	General Cemal Gürsel	No
2	General Fahri Özdilek	No
3	Brigadier General tr:Sıtkı Ulay	No
4	Staff Major tr:Suphi Gürsoytrak	No
5	Staff Lieutenant General tr:Suphi Karaman	No
6	Staff Captain tr:Kamil Karavelioğlu	No
7	Staff Colonel tr:Osman Köksal	No
8	Navy Staff Commodore tr:Selahattin Özgür	No
9	Staff Colonel tr:Sami Küçük	No
10	Staff Colonel tr:Ekrem Acuner	Yes
11	Staff Lieutenant Colonel tr:Refet Aksoyoğlu	Yes
12	Brigadier General tr:Mucip Ataklı	Yes
13	Airforce Staff Major tr:Emanullah Çelebi	Yes
14	Staff Major tr:Vehbi Ersü	Yes
15	Staff Lieutenant Colonel tr:Kadri Kaplan	Yes
16	Staff Colonel tr:Fikret Kuytak	Yes
17	Staff Lieutenant Colonel tr:Sezai Okan	Yes
18	Brigadier General tr:Mehmet Özgüneş	Yes
19	Staff Major tr:Şükran Özkaya	Yes
20	Airforce Staff Colonel tr:Haydar Tunçkanat	Yes
21	Staff Lieutenant Colonel tr:Ahmet Yıldız	Yes
22	Staff Colonel tr:Muzaffer Yurdakuler	Yes

== Rehabilitation ==
The other convicted defendants were first transferred to Kayseri prison, and released before completing their sentence under amnesty laws. In the second half of the 1970s, they regained their political rights.

Menderes, Polatkan and Zorlu were rehabilitated with Law No. 3623 adopted by the Grand National Assembly of Turkey on April 11, 1990. In accordance with the same law, their bodies were moved from İmralı to the mausoleum built for them on tr:Vatan Caddesi in Istanbul on September 17, 1990, the 29th anniversary of Menderes’ death, with a ceremony attended by President Turgut Özal.

A bill which removed the legal basis of the Yassıada trials was accepted by the Grand National Assembly of Turkey on 24 June 2020 and became law. According to this new law, the legal provisions forming the basis of the powers exercised by the Supreme Court of Justice, then still in effect, were repealed retrospectively. Parliament Speaker Mustafa Şentop said "The Grand National Assembly of Turkey not only held a historic session today, but also condemned the coup and this mentality before history and in the conscience of the nation by striking out a dark initiative that left deep traces in the nation's memory and the so-called legal regulations on which they were based."
