= Sıtkı Yırcalı =

Turkish lawyer and politician (1908–1988)

Personal details
- Born: 13 September 1908 Balıkesir, Ottoman Empire
- Died: 29 September 1988 (aged 80) Ankara, Turkey
- Resting place: Cebeci cemetery, Ankara
- Party: Democrat Party (1946–1960); Justice Party
- Children: 2
- Education: Istanbul University; University of Paris

Sıtkı Yırcalı (1908–1988) was a Turkish jurist and politician who served in various cabinet posts between 1950 and 1958. He was a member of the Democrat Party (DP) and then of the Justice Party (AP).

== Early life and education ==
Yırcalı was born in Balıkesir on 13 September 1908. He hailed from a well-known family, and his father, Yırcalızade Şükrü, was a member of the Committee of Union and Progress who was active in its local branch.

Sıtkı graduated from Kabataş Erkek Lisesi in 1928. He received a bachelor's degree in law from Istanbul University and a PhD in law from the University of Paris.

== Career and activities ==
Following his graduation Yırcalı worked as a lawyer in his hometown. He joined the DP in 1946 and became its head in Balıkesir. He was elected to the Parliament in 1950 and served there for three terms. In the cabinets led by Prime Minister Adnan Menderes Yırcalı held the following ministerial posts: minister of customs and monopolies (1951–1952), minister of industry (1952–1954; 1958), minister of economy and commerce (1954–1955) and minister of press and tourism (1957–1958). He resigned from office while serving as minister of economy and commerce in 1955. His tenure as minister of industry ended in 1958 when he resigned from the post.

Yırcalı, Fatin Rüştü Zorlu and Hasan Polatkan were investigated by a Parliamentary commission in January 1956 due to the allegations of their involvelment in importing East German trucks and tires of no value and a general neglect of their duty.

From 1957 to 1960 Yırcalı was among the DP members who opposed the hegemony of the founders of the party, including Adnan Menderes. The group included 150 DP members and headed by him.

Yırcalı was arrested after the military coup ending the rule of DP on 27 May 1960 and jailed in Yassıada for a while. He was not charged with a crime possibly due to his overt criticisms over the policies of the DP. He continued to work as a lawyer and was elected, as a senator for the AP in 1975.

== Personal life and death ==
Yırcalı was married and had a son and a daughter. His younger brother, Sırrı, was also a lawyer and a politician from the DP who was a member of the Parliament between 1954 and 1960.

Sıtkı Yırcalı died in Ankara on 29 September 1988 and was buried in Cebeci cemetery.
