= Ministry of Coordination (Turkey) =

Former ministry in Turkey (1958-1960)

Ministry of Coordination (Turkish: Koordinasyon Vekaleti) was a former ministry in Turkey. The ministry was founded during the 23rd government of Turkey on 10 July 1958. Its purpose was to coordinate the economic activities of the other ministries. However during the formation of the 24th government of Turkey it was abolished. Its mission was handed over to the State Planning Organization

== The minister of Coordination ==
Name of the minister	Party	Duration
Sebati Ataman	Democrat Party	10 July 1958-14 December 1959
Abdullah Aker	Democrat Paty	14 December 1958-27 May 1960
