= Tevfik İleri =

Turkish politician

Ahmet Tevfik İleri
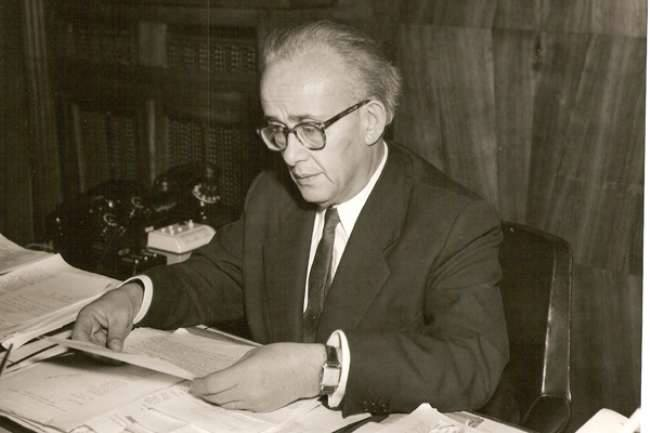

Minister of Public Works
- In office 19 January 1958 – 27 May 1960
- Prime Minister: Adnan Menderes
- Preceded by: Ethem Menderes
- Succeeded by: Daniş Koper

Deputy Prime Minister of Turkey
- In office 25 November 1957 – 19 January 1958
- Prime Minister: Adnan Menderes
- Preceded by: Fatin Rüştü Zorlu; Fuat Köprülü
- Succeeded by: Fahri Özdilek

Minister of National Education
- In office 13 April 1957 – 25 November 1957
- Prime Minister: Adnan Menderes
- Preceded by: Ahmet Özel
- Succeeded by: Celal Yardımcı

Minister of Transport
- In office 22 May 1950 – 11 August 1950
- Prime Minister: Adnan Menderes
- Preceded by: Kemal Satır
- Succeeded by: Seyfi Kurtbek

Personal details
- Born: 1911 Hemşin, Ottoman Empire
- Died: December 31, 1961 (aged 50) Ankara, Turkey
- Resting place: Cebeci Asri Cemetery, Ankara
- Party: Democrat Party (DP)
- Education: Civil engineering, Istanbul Technical University
- Occupation: Politician
- Profession: Civil engineer

Ahmet Tevfik İleri (1911 – 31 December 1961) was a Turkish civil engineer, civil servant, politician and government minister.

== Biography ==
Of Hamsheni origin, was born in Hemşin district of Rize Province in 1911. He spent his school years in Istanbul, and graduated from Istanbul Technical University in 1933. During his university years, he was elected as the chairman of the Turkish National Students Association (MTTB).

In 1933 at the age of 21, he began a career as supervisor engineer at the General Directorate of Highways in Erzurum, where he worked until 1937. He was then appointed as the local manager of the Public Construction Works in Çanakkale (1937–1942) and Samsun (1942–1946). From 1946 to 1950, İleri served as the manager of the Highway Authority in Samsun.

In 1950, he joined the Democrat Party (DP), and was elected as an MP from Samsun (electoral district). Throughout the DP-government years, he was always in the party's top politicians. He served as the Minister of Transportation (22 May 1950 – 11 August 1950), Minister of National Education (13 April – 25 November 1957 and 22 May 1959 – 8 December 1959 as placeholder), Deputy Prime Minister (25 November 1957 – 19 January 1958) and Minister of Public Works (19 January 1958 – 27 May 1960).

After the 1960 Turkish coup d'état, he was tried and imprisoned. However, he was hospitalized in 1961, and died in Ankara on 31 December the same year. He was buried at Cebeci Asri Cemetery in Ankara.

== Sources ==
- Karslıoğlu, Yusuf (2009). Doğu Karadeniz tarihi: otokton halkları ve etnik yapısı (in Turkish). Universal Yayınları. ISBN 978-975-01165-1-3.

Political offices
Preceded by Kemal Satır	Minister of Transport; 22 May 1950 – 11 August 1950	Succeeded by Seyfi Kurtbek
Preceded by Ahmet Özel	Minister of National Education; 13 April 1957 – 25 November 1957	Succeeded by Celal Yardımcı
Preceded by Fatin Rüştü Zorlu; Fuat Köprülü	Deputy Prime Minister of Turkey; 25 November 1957 – 19 January 1958	Succeeded by Fahri Özdilek
Preceded by Ethem Menderes	Minister of Public Works; 19 January 1958 – 27 May 1960	Succeeded by Daniş Koper
