= Namık Gedik =

Turkish physician and politician (1911–1960)

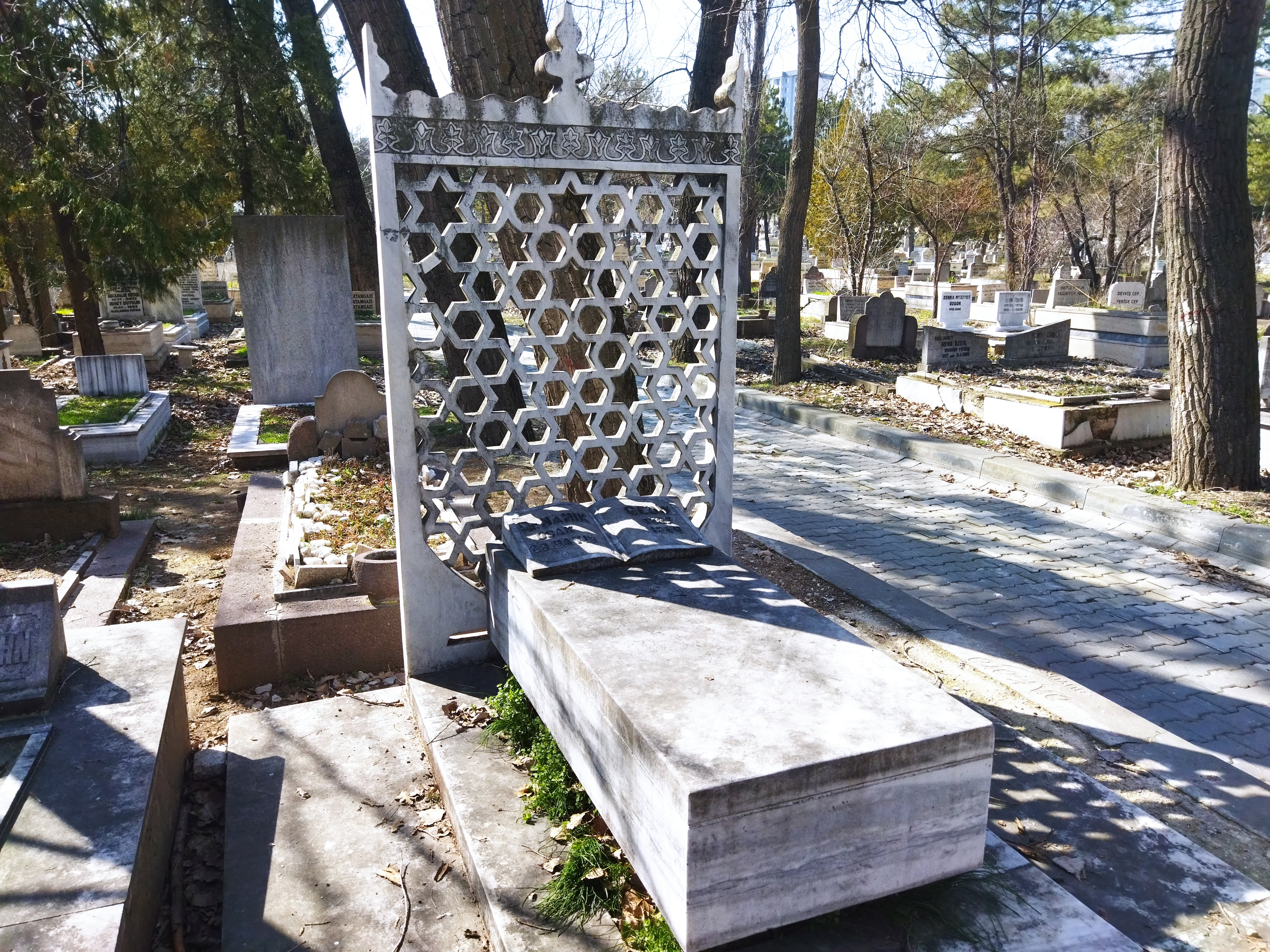
- Namık Gedik's grave

Minister of Interior
- In office 22 December 1956 – 27 May 1960
- President: Celal Bayar
- Prime Minister: Adnan Menderes
- In office 17 May 1954 – 10 September 1955
- President: Celal Bayar
- Prime Minister: Adnan Menderes
- Succeeded by: Ethem Menderes

Personal details
- Born: 1911 Trabzon, Ottoman Empire
- Died: 29 May 1960 (aged 48–49) Ankara, Turkey
- Party: Democrat Party
- Spouse: Melahat Gedik
- Children: 2
- Education: Istanbul University
- Occupation: Physician

Namık Gedik (1911–1960) was a Turkish physician and politician who served as the minister of interior in the mid-1950s. He was a member of the Democrat Party (DP) which was the ruling party in the period 1950–1960. Kemal Karpat describes him as part of the "rising professionals" within the early DP leadership. Gedik was arrested on 27 May 1960 immediately following the military coup along with his colleagues. Gedik committed suicide soon after his detention.

== Early life and education ==
Gedik hailed from a large family originated from Uşak. He was born in Trabzon in 1911 when his father was serving there as a post officer. He graduated from Kabataş High School in 1930 and received a bachelor's degree in medicine from Istanbul University in 1936.

During his university studies Gedik was a member of the Turkish National Student Union.

== Career ==
Following graduation Gedik began to work in Çine, Aydın, as a physician. In 1942 he completed his speciality training in medicine at Haydarpaşa Hospital, Istanbul, and worked at different medical institutions in various cities until 1946 when he resigned from the medical career and was involved in the establishment of the DP. He became a member of the Turkish parliament following the 1950 general election for Aydın and continued to serve in the parliament until 1960 winning a seat for Aydin in the general election in 1954 and in the next election in 1957.

Gedik served as minister of interior in the cabinets led by Prime Minister Adnan Menderes. Gedik was first appointed to the post on 17 May 1954, and his term ended on 10 September 1955 when he resigned from the office due to the 6–7 September incident, known as Istanbul pogrom. Ethem Menderes replaced Gedik in the post. Gedik was appointed to the same post for a second time on 22 December 1956 and remained in office until 27 May 1960. His both terms witnessed significant events, such as Istanbul pogrom and growing tensions with the Republican People's Party followers and other opposition forces. Following the military coup on 27 May 1960 Gedik and other DP members were arrested.

== Personal life and death ==
Gedik married Melahat Gedik, a judge, in 1937. She joined True Path Party in the 1980s and served at the Turkish parliament representing Aydın. She died in 1999. Namık and Melahat Gedik had two children. His son, Arda Gedik, died in September 2011.

Namık Gedik committed suicide on 29 May 1960 throwing himself out of a fourth-floor window of the War College, Ankara, where he had been in custody after the military coup of 27 May.
