= Refik Koraltan =

8th Speaker of the Parliament of the Republic of Turkey from 1950 to 1960

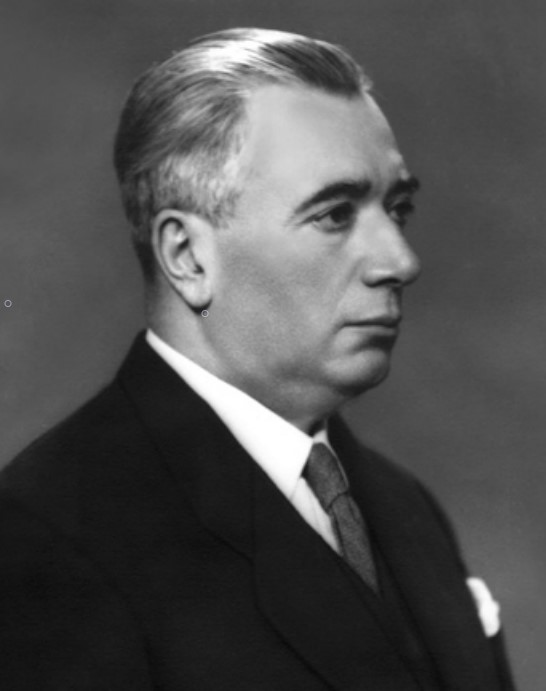
- Refik Koraltan in 1939

8th Speaker of the Grand National Assembly of Turkey
- In office 22 May 1950 – 27 May 1960
- Preceded by: Şükrü Saracoğlu
- Succeeded by: Kazım Orbay
- Constituency: Konya Province

Personal details
- Born: 1889 Divriği, Sivas vilayet, Ottoman Empire
- Died: 17 June 1974 (aged 84–85) Istanbul, Turkey
- Party: Democrat Party

Refik Koraltan (1889 – 17 June 1974) was a Turkish politician, having served as the Speaker of the Grand National Assembly of Turkey (TBMM) from 22 May 1950 to 27 May 1960.

== Biography ==
Koraltan was born in Divriği, Sivas Province, in 1889, the son of Ali Bey, a local leading citizen. Although he was known as Refik Koraltan, the name on his birth record was Bekir Refik. After completing the primary and middle education in Divriği, Koraltan studied at Istanbul Mercan High School. He graduated from Istanbul Faculty of Law in 1914.

== Political career ==
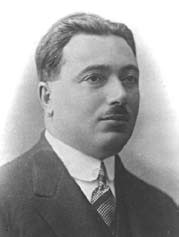
Refik Koraltan in the 1920s

Koraltan entered public service as an assistant prosecutor and became the Attorney General of Karaman in 1915. He was assigned as police inspector on 2 March 1918, and charged as Chief of Police of Trabzon on 29 May 1918. During this duty, he facilitated the establishment of the "Society of Defence of the National Rights to counteract the Pontus-Greek Organizations" that started to appear after the end of World War I.

He was elected in the TBMM as the Deputy of Konya in 1920 and reelected from the same city for three more terms.

He served as Governor of Bursa Province from 1939 to 1942.

He served briefly as governor of Konya Province before returning to the parliament six more terms. In 1946, he quit from the CHP and formed the Democratic Party together with Celal Bayar, Adnan Menderes and Mehmet Fuat Köprülü. Finally, he served as the Speaker of the TBMM from 22 May 1950 until 27 May 1960. During the Yassıada trials, Koraltan was convicted of political charges and imprisoned. He was released under an amnesty in 1966.

Koraltan died on 17 June 1974 in Istanbul, and is buried in Ankara.

== Personal life ==
Koraltan was married with four children.

== Sources ==
- Ministry of Culture and Tourism, the General Directorate of Cultural Heritages and Museums

Political offices
Preceded by Şükrü Saracoğlu	Speaker of the Parliament of Turkey; 22 May 1950–27 May 1960	Succeeded by Kazim Orbay
