= Yassıada =

Island in Turkey

Coordinates: 40°51′52″N 28°59′36″E

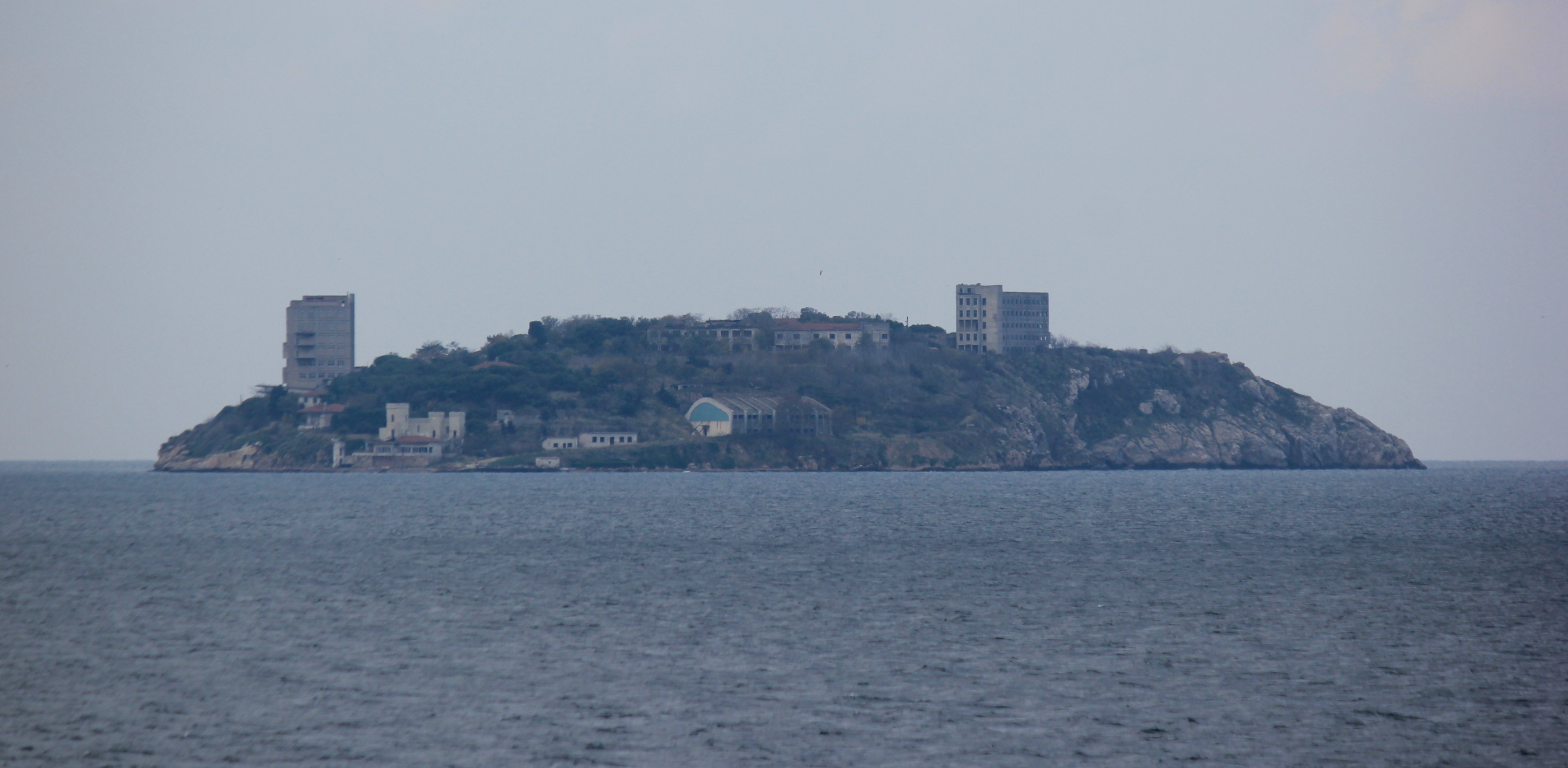
Yassıada in 2014

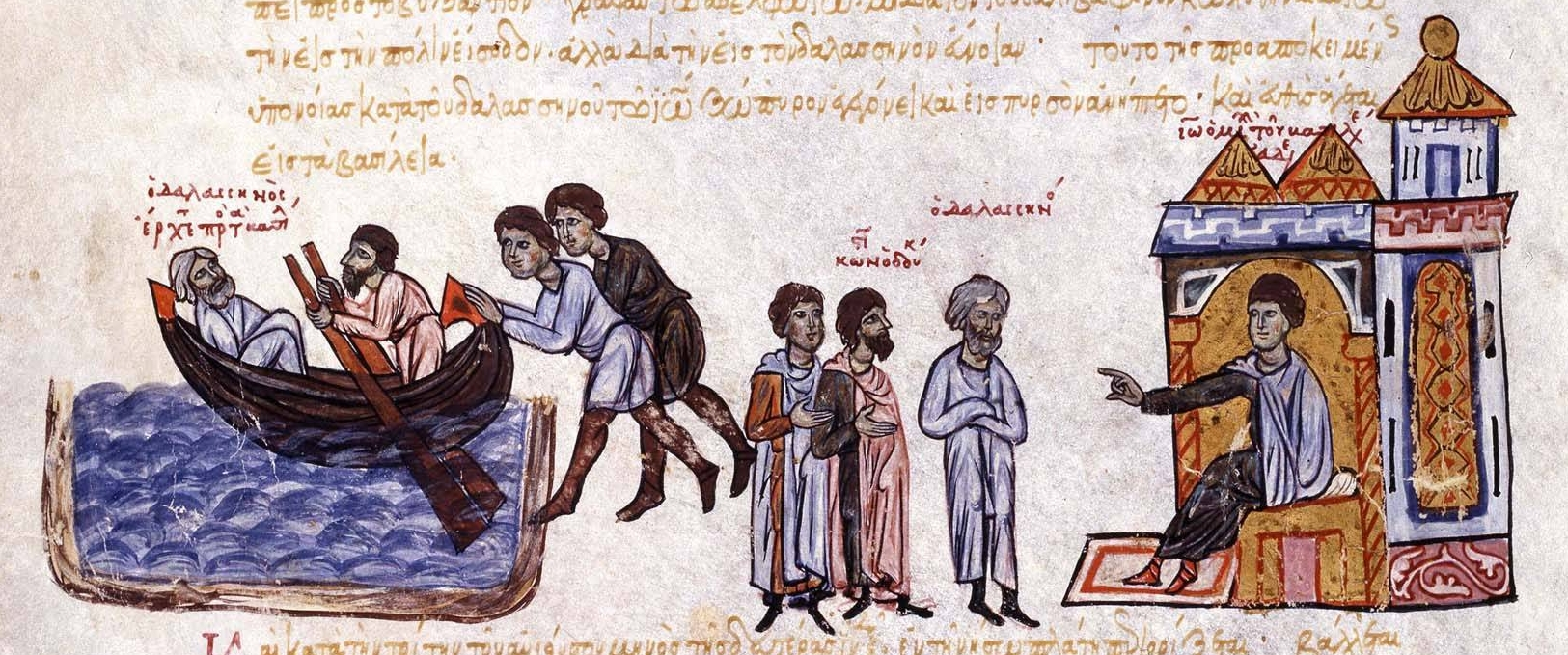
John the Orphanotrophos sends Constantine Dalassenos into exile on Plate (Yassıada) - miniature from the Madrid Skylitzes

Yassıada (Turkish: Flat Island), known as Plati (Greek: Πλάτη) in Greek times and officially renamed Democracy and Freedom Island (Turkish: Demokrasi ve Özgürlükler Adası) in 2013, is one of the Princes' Islands in the Sea of Marmara, to the southeast of Istanbul. In Byzantine times, it was also known as Plati (Greek: Πλάτη). It should not be confused with Yassi Ada, a different island in the Aegean Sea.

The island, which has an area of 45 acres (18 ha), is officially a neighbourhood of Adalar (Turkish: Islands) district of Istanbul Province, Turkey.

== History ==
The Byzantines first used Plati as a place to send prominent figures into exile. One such person was the Armenian Patriarch (Catholicos) Narses who was sent here before being imprisoned at Prinkipos in the 4th century AD. The island was still being use for political prisoners into the 11th century and the remains of four underground prison cells from this period can still be seen.

The Byzantine Emperor Theofilos built the Platea Monastery on the island and Patriarch Ignatios, who was exiled to the island in 860, built a church on it; tunnels under the church were used as a dungeon.

Plati was captured by the Latin Crusaders during the Fourth Crusade in 1204.

In 1857, Yassıada was purchased by the British ambassador Henry Bulwer, brother of novelist Edward Bulwer-Lytton, who built himself a mansion and a number of other structures here so that he could live undisturbed here. Bulwer even organised agricultural production here in the hope of being at least partially self-sufficient. However, he then sold Yassıada to the Khedive of Egypt Ismail Pasha who did not construct any new buildings and completely neglected the island.

With the establishment of the Republic of Turkey in 1923, the island became the property of the Turkish state, and in 1947 it was bought by the Turkish Navy which built several schools here. Between 1960 and 1961, the school buildings served as the venue for the trials of members of the former ruling Democrat Party, following the military coup of 1960. Several of the defendants were sentenced to death, and three of them - former Prime Minister Adnan Menderes and ministers Fatin Rüştü Zorlu and Hasan Polatkan - were taken to İmralı Island (near the southern shore of the Sea of Marmara) where they were executed in 1961.

After the trials, Yassıada was returned to the Turkish Navy and lessons continued to take place in the naval school buildings until 1978.

In 1993, the island became the property of Istanbul University's department of Marine Life and Sea Products, which used it for lessons and research. However, the strong winds on the island made life difficult for the students and eventually the classes were moved elsewhere.

The island was renamed Democracy and Freedom Island in 2013 in memory of the 1960 military coup, the first in the history of the Turkish Republic, and to eradicate the negative associations attached to the name 'Yassıada' after the 1960 trials.

In 2015 work began on redeveloping the island for tourism. Officially reopened by President Erdoğan on 27 May 2020, it now features a 27 May Museum, a convention centre, a hotel and a mosque. Disgruntled ecologists have nicknamed it Betonada (Turkish: Concrete Island).
