= Mehmet Fuat Köprülü =

Turkish scientist, politician and historian (1890–1966)

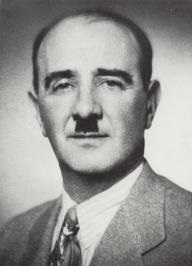

Minister of Foreign Affairs of Turkey
- In office 22 May 1950 – 15 April 1955
- President: Celâl Bayar
- Prime Minister: Adnan Menderes
- Preceded by: Necmettin Sadak
- Succeeded by: Adnan Menderes
- In office 9 December 1955 – 20 June 1956
- President: Celâl Bayar
- Prime Minister: Adnan Menderes
- Preceded by: Adnan Menderes
- Succeeded by: Fatin Rüştü Zorlu

Turkish Deputy Prime Minister
- In office 29 July 1955 – 9 December 1955
- Preceded by: Fatin Rüştü Zorlu
- Succeeded by: Ahmet Tevfik İleri

Personal details
- Born: December 4, 1890 Istanbul, Ottoman Empire (modern Turkey)
- Died: June 28, 1966 (aged 75) Istanbul, Turkey
- Education: Istanbul Erkek Lisesi
- Institutions: Istanbul University; Galatasaray High School; Mekteb-i Mülkiye; Sorbonne University

Mehmet Fuat Köprülü (5 December 1890 – 28 June 1966), also known as Köprülüzade Mehmed Fuad, was a Turkish sociologist, scholar, and Turkologist. He served as the Minister of Foreign Affairs and as Deputy Prime Minister of the Republic of Turkey. A descendant of the prominent Köprülü family, Fuat Köprülü was a key figure in the intersection of scholarship and politics in early 20th-century Turkey.

== Early life ==
Fuat Köprülü was born in the city of Istanbul in 1890 as Köprülüzade Mehmed Fuad. His father was Faiz Efendi, an Islamic judge. His mother, Hatice Hanım, was the daughter of an Islamic scholar.

His paternal grandfather, Ahmet Ziya Bey, was the former ambassador to Bucharest, and Ahmet Ziya Bey was son of the former head of the Imperial Chancery of State (Dîvân-i Hümâyun Beylikçisi), Köprülüzade Arif Bey. Köprülüzade Arif Bey descended from the Köprülüs of the 17th century, an exceptional dynasty of Grand Viziers whose reforms and conquests delayed the collapse of the Ottoman Empire. Fuat Köprülü was named after the first Grand Vizier of the Köprülü Era, Köprülü Mehmed Pasha.

Fuat Köprülü received his formal education at the Ayasofya Middle and Mercan High schools, both products of the Ottoman educational reforms of the 19th century. In 1905, while a student at Mercan High School and at the age of only 15 years, the magazine Musavver Terakki published three poems by Fuat Köprülü. By the time he entered the Istanbul University Law School at the age of 17, Fuat Köprülü already had an excellent command of French, Persian and Arabic. His first book, Hayat-i Fikriyye (The Intellectual Life), was published when he was 19 years old. After three years of study, Fuat Köprülü abandoned the School of Law because of the poor quality of instruction, saying that the diploma was not worth the loss of time it would entail.

== Career ==
=== The Making of a Nationalist Intellectual ===
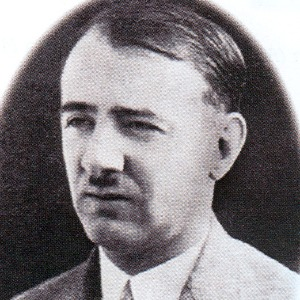
Mehmet Fuat Köprülü in his early days

From 1910 to 1913, Fuat Köprülü taught Turkish and literature at various high schools in Istanbul, including the prestigious Galatasaray High School. Fuat Köprülü initially opposed the literary movement known as New Language [yeni lisan], which sought to simplify the Turkish language, and wrote articles for the Servet-i Fünun magazine using a literary style comprehensible only to the most learned of Ottoman intellectuals. Fuat Köprülü changed his writing style and politics during the Balkan Wars. On February 6, 1913, the day after the Bulgarian army attacked the Ottoman lines in the outskirts of Istanbul, Türk Yurdu magazine, a bastion of simplified Turkish prose and Turkish nationalism, published the first of many popular and patriotic essays by the 23-year-old Fuat Köprülü: “Hope and Determination" (Umit ve Azim), “Mourning Migration (Hicret Matemleri), "A Turk's Prayer (Türk’ün Duasi), and “Turkishness, Islamness, Ottomanness" (Türklük, İslamlık, Osmanlılık). He published articles in İslam Mecmuası, one of the publications of the Committee of Union and Progress, between 1914 and 1918. From 1919 to 1920 he contributed to Büyük Mecmua, a supporter of the Turkish War of Independence.

Toward the end of 1913, Fuat Köprülü published his seminal and widely lauded academic article, The Method in Turkish Literary History (Türk Edebiyati Tarihinde Usul), in Bilgi Mecmuasi. He argued that historians should not only research kings, viziers, commanders and scholars, but ordinary people as well. Fuat Köprülü believed that in addition to public and official records, historians should also study art, archeology, literature, language, folklore and oral traditions. This plea of his for historians to study social history was 16 years before the emergence of Annales school, which embraced a similar approach in France. One month after the publication of this article, Fuat Köprülü was appointed a Professor of the History of Turkish Literature at Darülfünun when he was at the age of 23.

Fuat Köprülü continued his scholarly research and academic publications through the years, eventually culminating in his magnum opus, The First Mystics in Turkish Literature (Turk Edebiyatinda İlk Mutasavviflar), in 1918, a book that focused on two Turkish mystics and folk poets, Ahmet Yesevi and Yunus Emre. His Turk Edebiyati Tarihi (History of Turkish Literature), published in 1920, was another seminal book that traced the history of Turkish literature through millennia. In 1923, at the age of 33, Fuat Köprülü was appointed Dean of the Faculty of Literature at Istanbul University. In a short book entitled The History of Turkey (Türkiye Tarihi) published that same year, he reviewed the history of the Turks from ancient Central Asia to the modern Ottoman Empire, continuing the approach he pioneered in his study of Turkish literature.

=== Relationship with Mustafa Kemal Atatürk ===
Fuat Köprülü was appointed undersecretary to the minister of education at the request of President Atatürk and remained in this post for eight months. In addition, Fuat Köprülü was appointed the director of the Turcology Institute, established on the orders of President Atatürk, and began publishing Turkiyat Mecmuasi (The Turcology Journal).

In 1936 Köprülü was appointed editor-in-chief of Ülkü, an official periodical of the Ankara People House, one of the cultural institutions established by Atatürk in 1932, a position which he held until 1941.

=== International Recognition ===
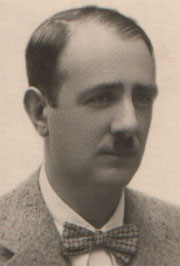
Another image of Mehmet Fuat Köprülü in the 1930s

Fuat Köprülü won numerous international accolades for his scholarship as well. The Soviet Academy of Sciences granted him a corresponding membership in 1925. The University of Heidelberg honored him with an honorary degree in 1927. The University of Athens and the University of Paris (Sorbonne) granted him honorary doctorates in 1937 and 1939, respectively. A number of European Oriental societies made him a corresponding or honorary member, as did the American Oriental Society in 1947.

In 1933, Fuat Köprülü became a professor ordinarius, a title denoting a professor of the highest rank in Turkey. In 1935, he delivered a series of influential lectures at the University of Paris (Sorbonne) on the origins of the Ottoman Empire. Fuat Köprülü argued that ethnic Turks formed the Ottoman Empire using Seljuk and Ilhanid administrative traditions, and he discredited the prevailing view among Western scholars that the Ottoman Empire was formed by a race of predominantly Albanian, Eastern Roman and Slavic converts to Islam.

=== Later Political Life ===
In 1935, at the request of President Atatürk, Fuat Köprülü joined the single party regime in the Turkish Parliament as a Kars deputy, and was elected again in 1939 and 1943. In 1945, as calls to establish a multiparty democracy increased after World War II, Fuat Köprülü joined the opposition and was dismissed from the ruling party along with Adnan Menderes and Refik Koraltan. In 1946, Menderes, Koraltan and Köprülü, together with Celal Bayar, formed the Democrat Party. Fuat Köprülü became the Minister of Foreign Affairs when the Democrat Party came to power following the 1950 elections, and he served in this post until 1955. In 1953, an agreement was reached between Yugoslav President Josip Tito and Fuat Köprülü that promoted the emigration of Albanians from Yugoslavia to Anatolia. Concerning Cyprus, he had a tolerant view of the dispute and supported the line of the Turkish government, that the status quo of a British government on the island was favorable. Fuat Köprülü also briefly served as Deputy Prime Minister in 1955. On September 6, 1957, Fuat Köprülü resigned from the Democrat Party after disagreeing with the authoritarian tendencies displayed by the party leadership; the same year he joined Liberty Party. Following the coup d'état in 1960 he was tried at the Yassıada trials but found not guilty.

== Death ==
Fuat Köprülü died on 28 June 1966.

== Works ==
A prolific scholar and public intellectual, Fuat Köprülü wrote over 1,500 poems, essays, articles and books. A Mehmet Fuat Koprulu Scholarship Programme was recently established to provide funds for Turkish students to undertake PhD study at the University of Cambridge. His works include the following:

- Yeni Osmanlı Tarih-i Edebiyatı (1916)
- Türk Edebiyatında İlk Mutasavvıflar (1918)
- Nasrettin Hoca (1918)
- Türk Edebiyatı Tarihi (1920)
- Türkiye Tarihi (1923)
- Bugünkü Edebiyat (1924)
- Fuzuli: Hayatı ve Eseri (1924)
- Azeri Edebiyatına Ait Tetkikler (1926)
- Milli Edebiyat Cereyanının İlk Mübeşşirleri ve Divan-ı Türk-i Basit (1928)
- Influence du chamanisme turco-mongol sur les ordres mystiques musulmans (1929)
- XIX uncu Asır Sazşairlerinden Erzurumlu Emrah (1929)
- XVI ncı Asır Sonuna Kadar Türk Sazşairleri (1930)
- XVII nci Asır Sazşairlerinden Kayıkçı Kul Mustafa ve Genç Osman hikayesi (1930)
- Türk Saz Şairleri Antolojisi (1930–1940, üç cilt)
- Bizans Müesseselerinin Osmanlı Müesseselerine Tesiri Hakkında Bazı Mülahazalar (1931)
- Türk Dili ve Edebiyatı Hakkında Araştırmalar (1934)
- Anadolu’da Türk Dili ve Edebiyatı’nın Tekamülüne Bir Bakış (1934)
- Les Origines de L'Empire Ottoman (Paris, 1935)
- Osmanlı Devleti’nin Kuruluşu (1959)
- Edebiyat Araştırmaları Külliyatı (1966)
- İslam ve Türk Hukuk Tarihi Araştırmaları ve Vakıf Müessesesi (1983)

=== Translations ===
- The Origins of the Ottoman Empire, trans. Gary Leiser. SUNY Press, 1992.
- The Seljuks of Anatolia: their history and culture according to local Muslim sources, trans. Gary Leiser. University of Utah Press, 1992.
- Islam in Anatolia after the Turkish Invasion (Prolegomena), trans. Gary Leiser. University of Utah Press, 1993.
- Some Observations on the Influence of Byzantine Institutions on Ottoman Institutions, trans. Gary Leiser. Türk Tarih Kurumu, 1999.
- Early Mystics in Turkish Literature, trans. by Gary Leiser and Robert Dankoff. Routledge, 2006.

Political offices
Preceded by Fethi Çelikbaş; Samet Ağaoğlu	Deputy Prime Minister of Turkey; May 17, 1954–Dec 9, 1955	Succeeded by Medeni Berk; Ahmet Tevfik İleri
Preceded by Necmettin Sadak	Minister of Foreign Affairs of Turkey; 1950–1955	Succeeded by Adnan Menderes
Preceded by Ethem Menderes	Minister of National Defense of Turkey (acting); Sep 15, 1955–Dec 9, 1955	Succeeded by Adnan Menderes
