= Hasan Polatkan =

Turkish politician (1915–1961)

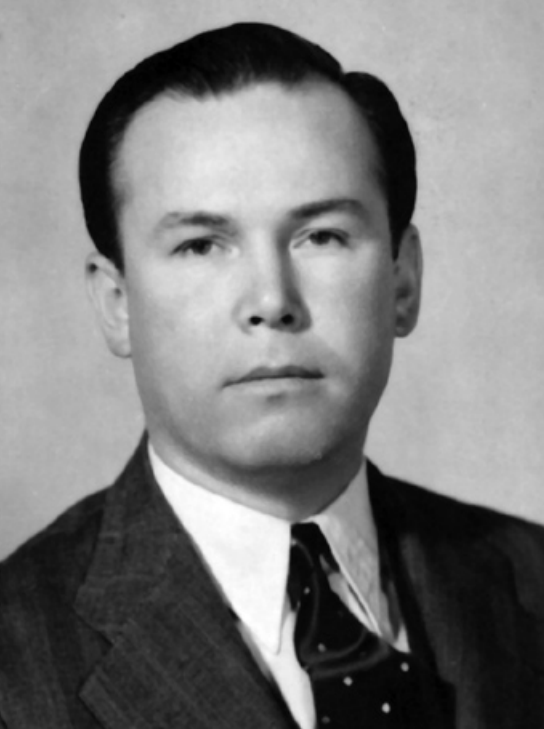

Minister of Finance of Turkey
- In office 3 December 1956 – 27 May 1960
- Prime Minister: Adnan Menderes
- Preceded by: Nedim Ökmen
- Succeeded by: Ekrem Alican

Minister of Finance of Turkey
- In office 14 December 1950 – 9 December 1955
- Prime Minister: Adnan Menderes
- Preceded by: Halil Ayan
- Succeeded by: Nedim Ökmen

Minister of Labor of Turkey
- In office 22 May 1950 – 22 December 1950
- Prime Minister: Adnan Menderes
- Preceded by: Mustafa Münir Birsel
- Succeeded by: Ahmet Hulusi Köymen

Personal details
- Born: 1915 Eskişehir, Ottoman Empire
- Died: 16 September 1961 (aged 46) İmralı Prison, İmralı, Turkey
- Cause of death: Execution by hanging
- Party: Democrat Party
- Spouse: Mutahhare
- Children: Nilgün (daughter)
- Education: Istanbul University (BA)

Hasan Polatkan (1915 – 16 September 1961) was a Turkish politician and Minister of Labor and Finance, who was executed by hanging after the 1960 Turkish coup d'état along with two other cabinet members.

== Early years ==
He was born 1915 in Eskişehir, Ottoman Empire (now Turkey) to a family of Crimean Tatar descent. He studied political science at Istanbul University. After his graduation in 1936, Polatkan worked at the publicly owned Ziraat Bank as inspector.

== Political career ==
Polatkan entered politics and was elected in the 1946 general election deputy of Eskişehir into the Turkish Grand National Assembly for the Democratic Party. He secured his seat in the parliament after the 1950, 1954 and 1957 general elections. He served in the cabinet of Prime Minister Adnan Menderes as Minister of Labor (22 May – 14 December 1950) and later twice as Minister of Finance (14 December 1950 – 9 December 1955 and 3 December 1956 – 27 May 1960) until the 1960 Turkish coup d'état which ousted the 19th government.

Polatkan, Sıtkı Yırcalı and Fatin Rüştü Zorlu were investigated by a parliamentary commission in January 1956 due to the allegations of their involvement in importing East German trucks and tires of no value and a general neglect of their duty.

== Coup, trial and execution ==
He was arrested with Menderes in Kütahya, charged with corruption and violating the constitution along with some other party members, and arraigned at the Yassıada trials. Polatkan was sentenced to death and hanged on the island of İmralı on 16 September 1961, as were Adnan Menderes and Fatin Rüştü Zorlu. Many years after his death, his grave was moved to a mausoleum in Istanbul on 17 September 1990 along with Menderes' and Zorlu's remains.

He was survived by his wife Mutahhare Polatkan and daughter Nilgün Polatkan.

== Legacy ==
A boulevard in Eskişehir is named after him. His name is given to a high school in Bakırköy, Istanbul, as well as to a secondary school, and a cultural center in Odunpazarı, Eskişehir. The airport in the city of Eskişehir is also named after him.

Political offices
Preceded by Mustafa Münir Birsel	Minister of Labor of Turkey; 22 May 1950–22 December 1950	Succeeded by Ahmet Hulusi Köymen
Preceded by Halil Ayan	Minister of Finance of Turkey; 14 December 1950–9 December 1955	Succeeded by Nedim Ökmen
Preceded by Nedim Ökmen	Minister of Finance of Turkey; 3 December 1956–27 May 1960	Succeeded by Ekrem Alican
