= Fatin Rüştü Zorlu =

Turkish politician (1910–1961)

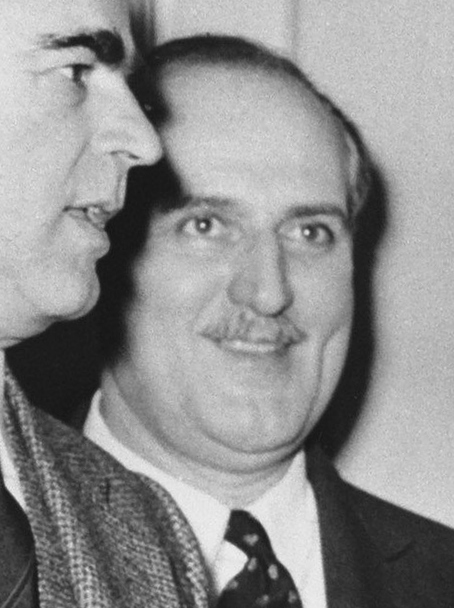

Turkish Foreign Minister
- In office 25 November 1957 – 27 May 1960
- Prime Minister: Adnan Menderes
- Preceded by: Mehmet Fuat Köprülü
- Succeeded by: Selim Sarper

Turkish Deputy Prime Minister
- In office 17 May 1954 – 29 July 1955
- Preceded by: Samet Ağaoğlu
- Succeeded by: Mehmet Fuat Köprülü

Personal details
- Born: 20 April 1910 Istanbul, Ottoman Empire
- Died: 16 September 1961 (aged 51) İmralı Prison, İmralı, Turkey
- Cause of death: Execution by hanging
- Spouse: Emel Aras
- Children: 1
- Education: Galatasaray High School
- Alma mater: Sciences Po Paris (BA); University of Geneva (LLB)

Fatin Rüştü Zorlu (20 April 1910 – 16 September 1961) was a Turkish diplomat and politician. He was executed by hanging after the coup d'état in 1960 along with two other politicians.

== Early life and education ==
He was born on 20 April 1910 in Istanbul to a family originating from the village of Zor, Artvin in northeastern Turkey. After finishing high school at Galatasaray High School, Zorlu was educated in political science at the Institut d'études politiques de Paris, France and in law at the University of Geneva, Switzerland.

== Political career ==
Returning to Turkey, Zorlu began his career as a diplomat in 1932 in the Ministry of Foreign Affairs. From 1938 on, he served at various posts in embassies and consulates in Bern (Switzerland), Paris (France), Moscow (USSR), Beirut (Lebanon) and at the ministry in Ankara as well. Following Turkey's joining of NATO on 18 February 1952 he was appointed ambassador to NATO at the Supreme Headquarters Allied Powers Europe in Paris.

In 1954, Zorlu entered politics and was elected to the Turkish Grand National Assembly as the deputy of Çanakkale for the Democratic Party. He served as deputy prime minister in 1954–1955 and as minister of state in 1955. In 1955 he was also acting minister of foreign affairs and participated in the Tripartite Conference on Cyprus problem in London in June that year. Zorlu left the office in late 1955. He, Sıtkı Yırcalı and Hasan Polatkan were investigated by a Parliamentary commission in January 1956 over allegations of their involvement in importing East German trucks and tires of no value and a general neglect of their duty.

Zorlu was appointed minister for foreign affairs in 1957 and held the post until 27 May 1960 when the Turkish Armed Forces staged a coup and ousted the government of Prime Minister Adnan Menderes. In 1959, he participated along with Adnan Menderes in the Bilderberg Meeting in Yeşilköy, Turkey. It is rumoured that the coup might have something to do with that meeting.

During his tenure as minister of foreign affairs Turkey applied for the membership of the European Economic Community in 1959.

== Coup, trial and execution ==
He was arrested along with other party members following the 1960 Turkish coup d’état, charged by the junta members with violating the constitution, and put on trial on the island of Yassıada. His roommate in the Yassıada prison was Celal Yardımcı, a fellow party member and minister of justice. He and Menderes were accused by the court of planning the Istanbul Pogrom. Though both of them rejected the claims, it is believed by scholars that Menderes assented to the organization of protests in İstanbul against the Greeks, but the extent of knowledge of Zorlu, who had been in London for the conference, is unclear. According to Zorlu's lawyer at the Yassiada trial, a mob of 300,000 was marshaled in a radius of 40 miles (60 km) around the city for the attacks.

Zorlu was sentenced to death and executed by hanging on the island of İmralı on 16 September 1961 along with Adnan Menderes and Hasan Polatkan. He approached the gallows calmly, helped the hangman to lay the noose around his neck.

== Personal life ==
Zorlu married Emel Aras on 29 October 1933. She was the daughter of Tevfik Rüştü Aras who was serving as the minister of foreign affairs at that time. Fatin Rüştü Zorlu and Emel Aras had a daughter, Sevin Zorlu (1936–2006), who was a journalist.

== Legacy ==
Many years after his death his grave was moved to a mausoleum in İstanbul on 17 September 1990 along with the graves of the two other cabinet members hanged.

== See also ==
- List of Turkish diplomats

Political offices
Preceded by Fethi Çelikbaş; Samet Ağaoğlu	Deputy Prime Minister of Turkey; 17 May 1954–9 December 1955	Succeeded by
Preceded by İbrahim Ethem Menderes	Minister of Foreign Affairs of Turkey; 25 November 1957–27 May 1960	Succeeded by Selim Rauf Sarper
