= Adnan Menderes =

9th Prime Minister of the Republic of Turkey from 1950 to 1960

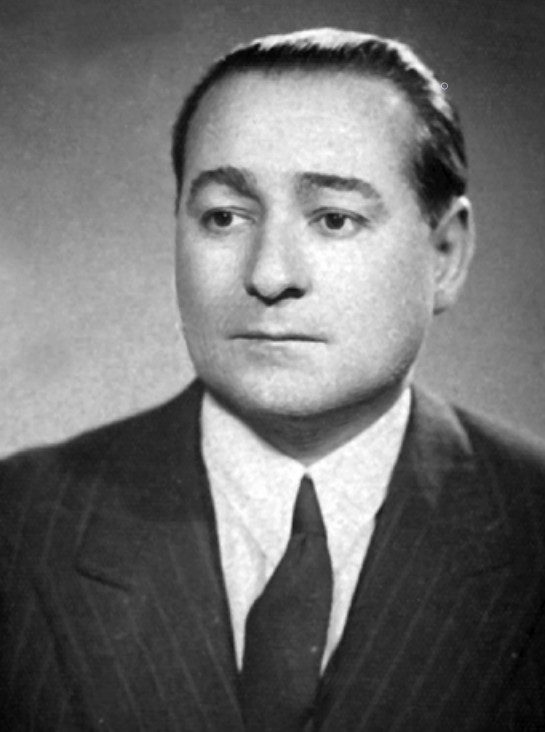
- Menderes in 1939

9th Prime Minister of Turkey
- In office 22 May 1950 – 27 May 1960
- President: Celâl Bayar
- Preceded by: Şemsettin Günaltay
- Succeeded by: Cemal Gürsel

Party Leader of the Democrat Party
- In office 9 June 1950 – 27 May 1960
- Preceded by: Celâl Bayar
- Succeeded by: Position abolished

Member of the Grand National Assembly
- In office 25 April 1931 – 27 May 1960
- Constituency: Aydın (1931, 1935, 1939, 1943); Kütahya (1946); Istanbul (1950, 1954, 1957)

Personal details
- Born: 1899 Koçarlı, Ottoman Empire
- Died: 17 September 1961 (aged 62) İmralı, Republic of Turkey
- Cause of death: Execution by hanging
- Party: SCF (1930); CHP (1930–1945); Independent (1945–1946); DP (1946–1960)
- Spouse: Berrin Menderes (m. 1928)
- Children: Yüksel; Mutlu; Aydın
- Education: Şirinyer American College
- Alma mater: Ankara University (LLB)
- Awards: See below
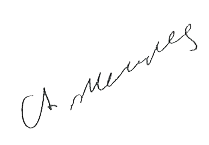
- Signature

Ali Adnan Ertekin Menderes (Turkish: [adˈnan ˈmændeɾes]; 1899 – 17 September 1961) was a Turkish politician who served as Prime Minister of Turkey between 1950 and 1960, and one of the founders of the Democrat Party (DP).

Hailing from a landowning family of Western Anatolia, he began his political career in 1930 with the short-lived Liberal Republican Party. After it was banned he was inducted into the ruling Republican People's Party (CHP), identifying with the party's liberal-conservative faction that was against land reform and state-run enterprises. With the Motion with Four Signatures incident and internal party opposition to President İsmet İnönü, he was expelled from the CHP in 1945, and cofounded the center-right Democrat Party with Celâl Bayar, Mehmet Fuad Köprülü, and Refik Koraltan.

The DP came to power after winning the 1950 general election, which represented a peaceful transition of power from the CHP. Bayar was subsequently elected president, and tasked Menderes as DP leader and prime minister from 1950–1960. Menderes relaxed restrictions on religion. His premiership saw Turkey's economy initially boom with Marshall Plan aid and privatization, until the economy stalled in the mid-50s. During his premiership, Turkey participated in the Korean War and was admitted to NATO in 1952. Menderes' government was controversial for entrenching an authoritarian regime, using state resources to harass the opposition, particularly the CHP and İsmet İnönü; suppressing the press, and initiating the Istanbul Pogrom.

Menderes was overthrown in the 1960 coup d'état. He was put on trial for corruption and violating the constitution. He was convicted with the death penalty and hanged along with two other cabinet members: Fatin Rüştü Zorlu and Hasan Polatkan. He was the last Turkish political leader to be executed after a military coup. In 1990, the Turkish parliament passed a law rehabilitating Menderes, Polatkan, and Zorlu. He is one of the four political leaders of the Turkish Republic who have been honored with a mausoleum, the others being Kemal Atatürk, Süleyman Demirel, and Turgut Özal.

== Early life and career ==
Ali Adnan Menderes was born in 1899 in Koçarlı, Aydın, to a wealthy landowner of Crimean Tatar origin. He played football, initially as a forward for Karşıyaka and later as a goalkeeper for Altay. After primary school, Menderes attended the American College in İzmir. He underwent reserve officer training during World War I but was unable to go to the front due to contracting malaria.

He fought against the invading Greek army during the Turkish War of Independence and was awarded the Medal of Independence.

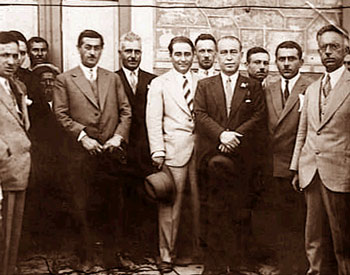
Adnan Menderes and Ali Fethi Okyar with the members of the Liberal Republican Party

In 1930, Adnan Menderes organized a branch of the short-lived Liberal Republican Party (Turkish: Serbest Cumhuriyet Fırkası) in Aydın. After the party dissolved itself, he was invited by Atatürk himself to join the ruling Republican People's Party (CHP) and was nominated by the party leaders as a deputy of Aydın and elected in 1931. He graduated from the Ankara University Law School in 1935.

After Atatürk's death's and İnönü assumed leadership of the CHP. Menderes opposed İnönü's statist agenda, aligning himself with the party's liberal-conservative faction. Menderes became known for his objections during the deliberations on the "Law on Providing Land to Farmers." Asserting that the state already owned more than 70% of all land in Turkey and accusing İnönü of intending to collectivize agriculture in June 1945, Menderes, together with Celâl Bayar, Fuat Köprülü and Refik Koraltan demanded more political and democratic freedom in their Motion with four signatures. The motion was not approved by any member of the Turkish parliament except for the four who brought the motion to parliament, and by September 1945, Menderes, Köprülü and Koraltan were all stripped of their membership of the CHP due to their opposition to the Turkish government. Bayar then resigned from parliament and later also the party. On 7 January 1946, the four formed the Democrat Party (DP) and in the 1946 elections Menderes was elected deputy of the Democrat Party representing Kütahya.

== Prime minister (1950-1960) ==
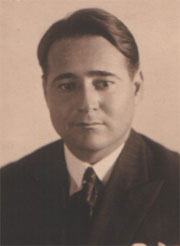
Adnan Menderes, 1930s

When the DP won 52% of the votes in the first free elections in Turkish history on 14 May 1950 in which votes were cast in secret and counted openly, Menderes became prime minister, and in 1955 he also assumed the duties of foreign minister. He later won two more free elections, one in 1954 and the other in 1957.

During the 10 years of his term as prime minister, the Turkish economy was growing at a rate of 9% per annum. He supported an eventual military alliance with the Western Bloc and during his tenure, Turkey participated in the Korean War, and was admitted to the NATO in 1952 with the support of the opposition CHP. With the economic support of the United States via the Marshall Plan, agriculture was mechanized; and transport, energy, education, health care, insurance and banking progressed. Some historical studies note that Turkey experienced a significant economic downturn in the mid-1950s during Prime Minister Adnan Menderes’s tenure, including an estimated 11% decline in GDP per capita in 1954.

=== Istanbul pogrom ===
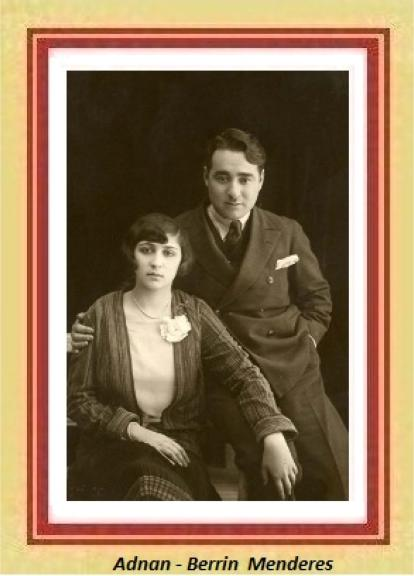
Adnan and Berrin Menderes

In 1955, several historical sources link the Menderes government to the Istanbul pogrom, which targeted the city's Greek ethnic minority. In September 1955 a bomb exploded close to the Turkish consulate in Greece's second-largest city, Thessaloniki, also damaging the Atatürk Museum, site of Atatürk's birthplace. The damage to the house was minimal, with some broken windows. In retaliation, in Istanbul thousands of shops, houses, churches and even graves belonging to members of the ethnic Greek minority were destroyed within a few hours, over a dozen people were killed and many more injured.

The ongoing struggle between Turkey and Greece over control of Cyprus, and Cypriot intercommunal violence, formed part of the backdrop to the pogrom. The United Kingdom invited Turkey and Greece to a conference in London, which started on 26 August 1955. The day before the Tripartite London Conference (29 August – 7 September 1955) began, Menderes claimed that Greek Cypriots were planning a massacre of Turkish Cypriots. Seeing the opportunity to extricate Britain, Prime Minister Anthony Eden advised the Turkish delegates that they should be stern. Foreign Minister Fatin Rüştü Zorlu paid heed to Eden and launched a harsh opening salvo, stating that Turkey would reconsider its commitment to the Treaty of Lausanne unless Greece reconsidered its position on Cyprus. The Greek delegates, surprised by the harshness of the speech, held the British responsible for the change in Turkish attitudes. Finally, the conference fell apart on 6 September, the first day the subject of Cyprus would be broached at the conference, when news broke of the bombing in Thessaloniki.

Deflecting domestic attention to Cyprus was politically convenient for the Menderes government, which was suffering from an ailing economy. Although a minority, the Greek population played a prominent role in Istanbul's business life, making them a convenient scapegoat during the economic crisis in the mid-1950s. The DP responded first with inflationary policies, then when that failed, with authoritarianism and populism. DP's policies also introduced rural-urban mobility, which exposed some of the rural population to the lifestyles of the urban minorities. The three chief destinations were the largest three cities: Istanbul, Ankara, and İzmir. Between 1945 and 1955, the population of Istanbul increased from 1 million to about 1.6 million. Many of these new residents found themselves in shanty towns (Turkish: gecekondular), and constituted a prime target for populist policies.

The 1961 Yassıada trials after the 1960 coup d'état accused Menderes and Foreign Minister Fatin Rüştü Zorlu of planning the riots, finding that the supposed assault was in fact a provocation organised by the Menderes government, which planted the bomb in Thessaloniki and also bussed infuriated villagers from Anatolia into Istanbul with the aim of "punishing" Greeks. Menderes subsequently apologized and offered compensation to those affected.

While the DP took the blame for the events, it was revealed in 2005 that the riots were also a product of Turkey's Tactical Mobilization Group; a clandestine special forces unit. Four-star general Sabri Yirmibeşoğlu, the right-hand man of General Kemal Yamak who led the Turkish outpost of Operation Gladio under the Tactical Mobilization Group (Turkish: Seferberlik Taktik Kurulu), proudly reminisced about his involvement in the riots, calling them "a magnificent organization".

=== Plane crash survival ===
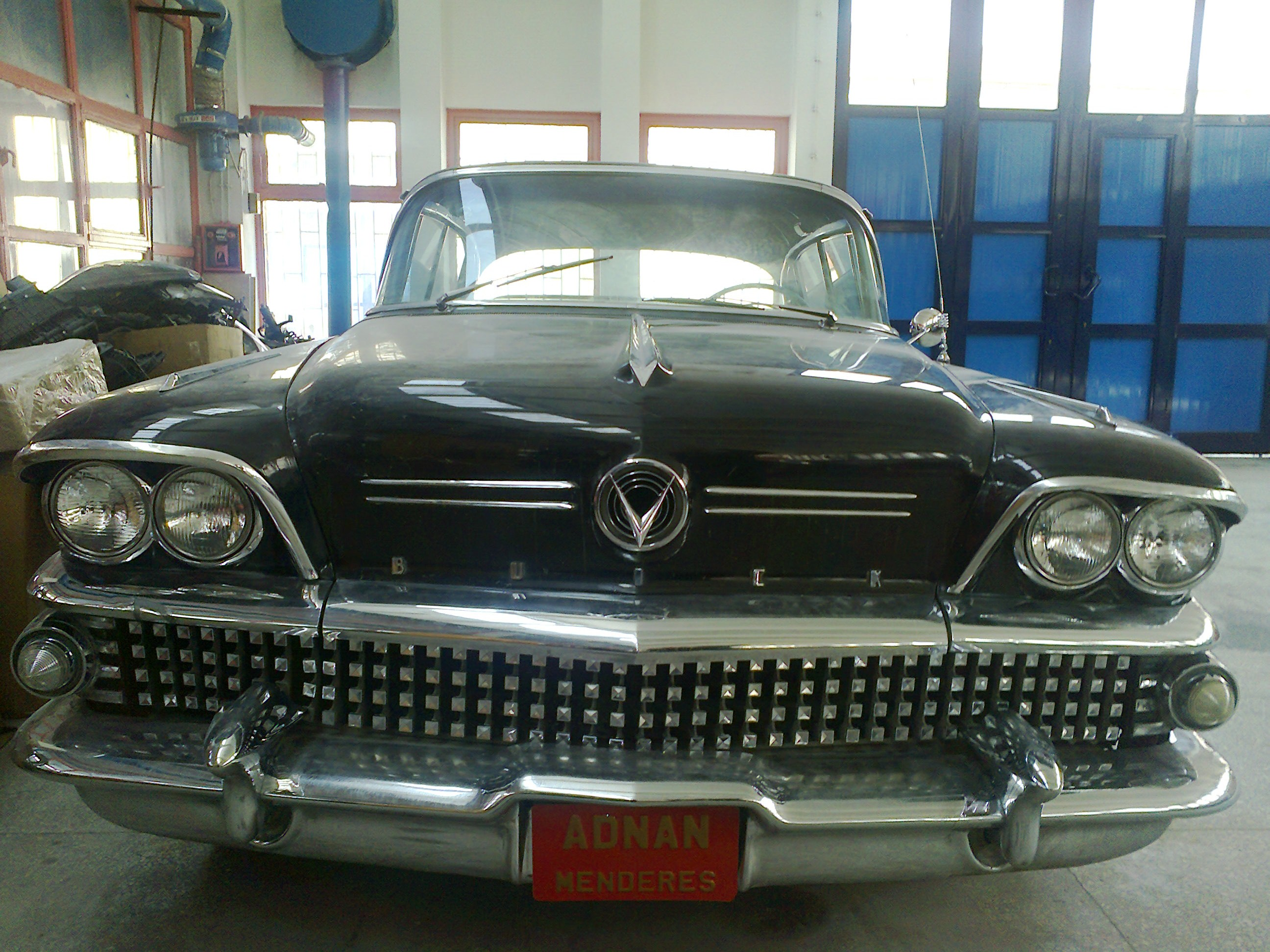
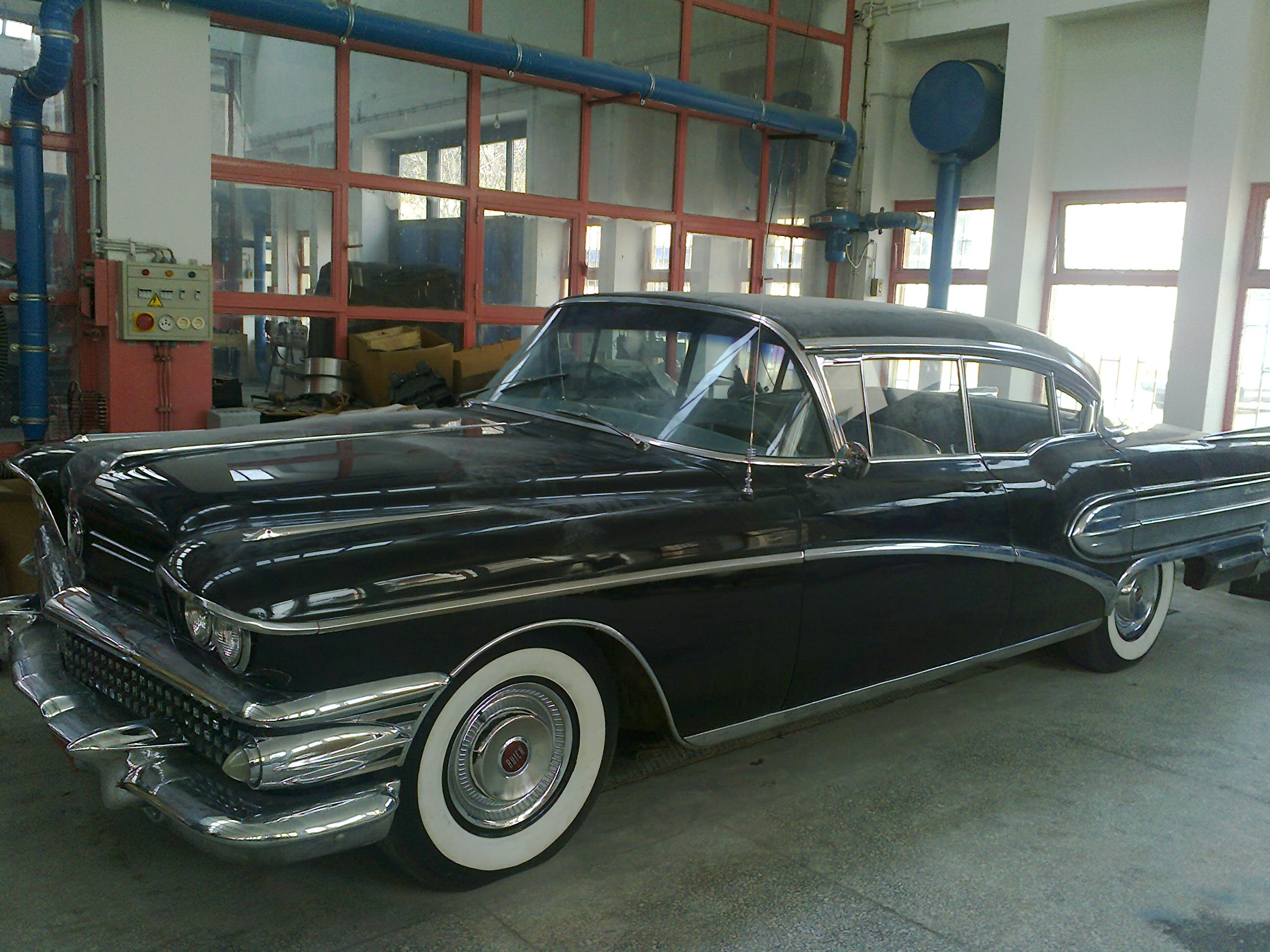
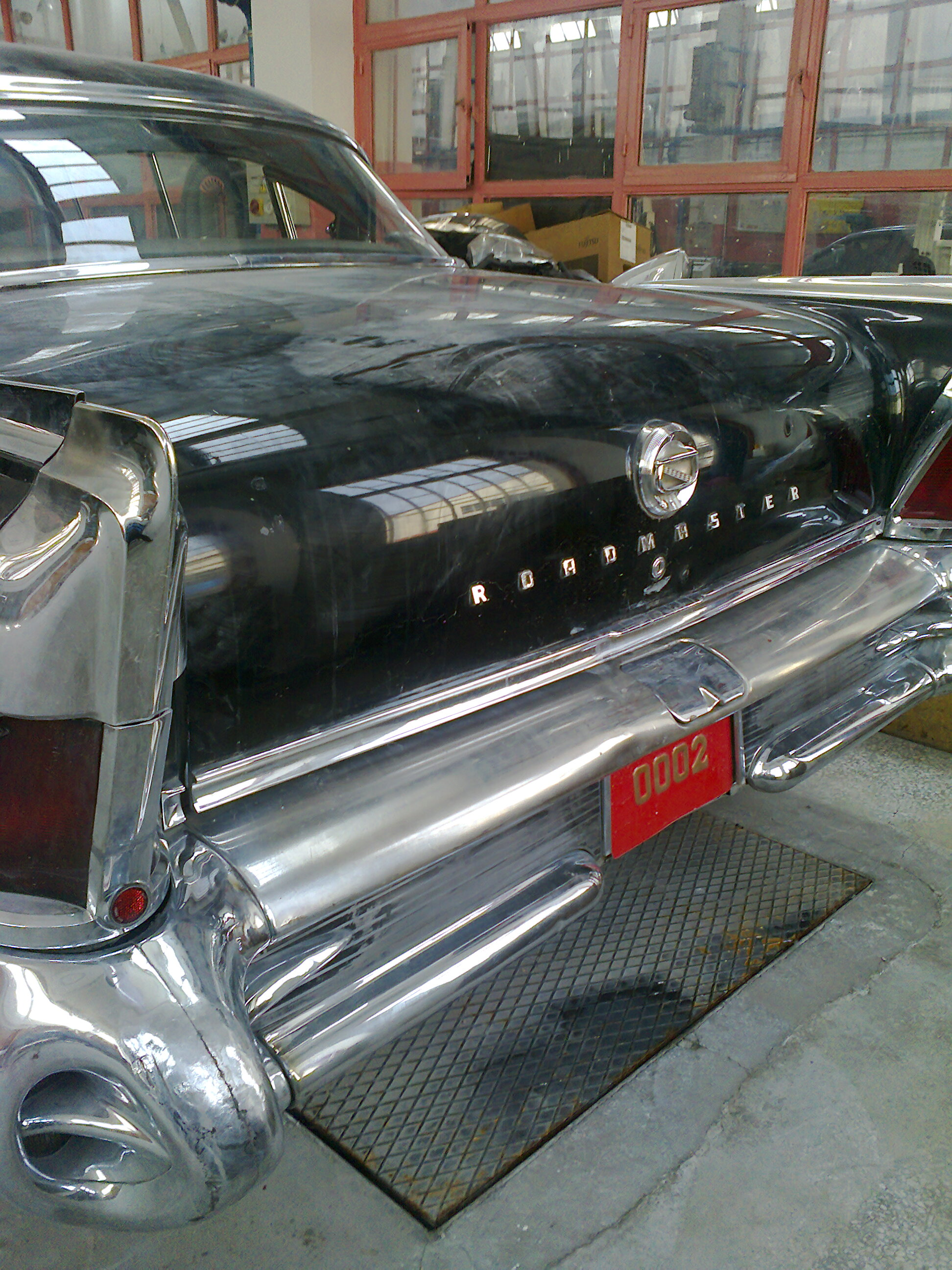
Adnan Menderes' car, 1958 Buick Roadmaster 75

On 17 February 1959, the Turkish Airlines aircraft Vickers Viscount Type 793, registration TC-SEV, carrying Adnan Menderes and a party of government officials on a flight from Istanbul to London Gatwick Airport crashed a few miles short of the runway, near Rusper, Sussex, in heavy fog and caught fire. Nine of the sixteen passengers and five of the eight crew lost their lives. Menderes, sitting in the rear of the plane, survived the accident almost uninjured and was hospitalized at the London Clinic for 90 minutes after receiving first aid from Margaret Bailey, a local resident who rushed to the crash site.

He was on his way to sign the London Agreements on the Cyprus issue with British Prime Minister Harold Macmillan and Greek Prime Minister Constantine Karamanlis, which gave the three sides the right to intervene in Cyprus in case peace is broken by any of the parties.

Menderes signed the London Agreement on 19 February 1959 in the hospital. He returned home on 26 February 1959 and was welcomed by even his arch-rival İsmet İnönü and a large crowd.

=== Domestic and foreign policy ===
Menderes became quite famous for selling or distributing most of the estate he had inherited to small shareholders. He was more tolerant towards traditional lifestyles and different forms of practice of Islam than Atatürk and his party had been – he campaigned in the 1950 elections on the platform of legalizing the Arabic Islamic call to prayer (adhan), which had been banned in order to extirpate Arabic influences. One of his first political moves was to exclude the pictures of İsmet İnönü on Turkish banknotes and stamps and instead put Atatürk pictures back, which were taken off when İnönü became president in 1938. Thanks to the public support and the legacy of Atatürk, it was a successful move, even if the Turkish law under the former president stated that the image of the president of the country would be placed on the banknotes (in this case Celâl Bayar).

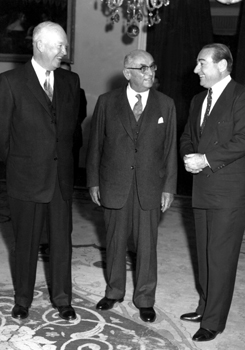
President Dwight D. Eisenhower meets with President Celâl Bayar and Prime Minister Adnan Menderes at the Presidential Residence in Çankaya (December 1959).

While remaining pro-Western, he was more active than his predecessors in building relations with Muslim countries. Menderes had a more liberal economic policy than earlier prime ministers, and allowed more private enterprise. In general, his economic policies of high agricultural spending, especially in infrastructure, meant that the peasants of Turkey appreciated his premiership. He also attended the Bilderberg Meeting in 1957 and 1959.

He was most intolerant towards criticism, so he instituted press censorship and had journalists arrested, as well as attempting to oppress the opposing political parties and take institutions such as universities under his control. Menderes who was well liked by the people in general and also had the support of the Army Chief of Staff General Cemal Gürsel who, in a personal patriotic memorandum, had advocated that Menderes should become the president of the republic to secure the national unity, became increasingly unpopular among the intellectuals, university students and a group of radical young officers in the military, who feared that Kemalist ideology was in danger.

== Coup, trial, and execution ==
A military coup on 27 May 1960, organized by 37 "young officers", deposed the government, and Menderes was arrested along with Bayar and all the leading party members. They were charged with violating the constitution, and embezzling money from state funds, and ordering the Istanbul pogrom, in which dozens of Greeks were killed.

Menderes and other leading figures of the DP were put on trial (see Yassıada trials) by a military court on the island of Yassıada. Along with Bayar and two former cabinet ministers, Menderes was sentenced to death. He delayed his execution with a suicide attempt by taking an overdose of sleeping pills. Despite pleas for forgiveness by Head of State Cemal Gürsel and even from İsmet İnönü, in addition to similar pleas from several world leaders, including John F. Kennedy and Queen Elizabeth II, Menderes was executed by the junta at the gallows on the island of İmralı on 17 September 1961. The sentence of ex-President Bayar was commuted to imprisonment.

Two months later, İsmet İnönü formed a new government under military tutelage, in coalition and with the help of the newly emerging Justice Party (Turkish: Adalet Partisi), after these two major parties among themselves took the majority of the votes in 1961 elections. Adalet Partisi, the successor of the heritage of Menderes, would win victories in later elections especially under the leadership of Süleyman Demirel.

== Legacy ==
On 17 September 1990, the 29th anniversary of Menderes' execution, he was posthumously pardoned by the Turkish Parliament and his grave was moved to a mausoleum named after him in Istanbul. Fatin Rüştü Zorlu and Hasan Polatkan, who were the foreign affairs minister and finance minister, respectively in the last Menderes administration, and who were hanged with Menderes by the junta in 1961, were also posthumously cleared of any misconduct. Adnan Menderes University in Aydın and Adnan Menderes Airport in İzmir are named after him. Two high schools, Istanbul Bahcelievler Adnan Menderes Anadolu Lisesi and Aydın Adnan Menderes Anadolu Lisesi, also adopted his name. There are numerous city districts, boulevards and streets named after him by city councils in cities large and small, all across Turkey.

In 2006, Mehmet Feyyat, the attorney general of Istanbul at the time, suggested that "İsmet İnönü and Cemal Gürsel placed phone calls to the prison's administration to halt Menderes' execution, but the Communications Office of the junta cut off the lines."

In March 2023, a monument to Adnan Menderes was unveiled at the Akhmet Yassawi International Kazakh-Turkish University in Turkistan.

== Honors and medals ==
- Turkey: Medal of Independence awarded by Grand National Assembly of Turkey (1931)
- Japan: Order of the Rising Sun by the Japanese government (1958)

== Film and television ==
- The last period of Menderes' life beginning with his 1959 aircraft crash survival until his execution was depicted in the television series Hatırla Sevgili (English: Remember Darling) as background events.
- The period when Menderes was prime minister from 1950 to 1960 were depicted in the television series Ben Onu Çok Sevdim (English: I Loved Him So Much). Series which began broadcasting at Turkish national broadcaster ATV from September 2013 also focuses on the romance between Menderes and Turkish opera singer Ayhan Aydan. He was played by actor Mehmet Aslantuğ.

== See also ==
- Adnan Menderes University
- Adnan Menderes Airport
- Adnan Menderes Boulevard
- Adnan Menderes Stadium
- Adnan Menderes Mausoleum
- Adnan Menderes Anadolu Lisesi

== Notes and references ==
Political offices
Preceded by Mehmet Fuat Köprülü	Minister of National Defense of Turkey (acting); 9 December 1955–28 July 1957	Succeeded by Hasan Şemi Ergin
Preceded by Mehmet Fuat Köprülü	Minister of Foreign Affairs of Turkey; 1955	Succeeded by Fatin Rüştü Zorlu
Preceded by Şemsettin Günaltay	Prime Minister of Turkey; 22 May 1950–27 May 1960	Succeeded by Cemal Gürsel
Party political offices
Preceded by Celâl Bayar	Leader of the Democratic Party; 9 June 1950–27 May 1960	Succeeded by Süleyman Demirel of Adalet Partisi and Necmettin Erbakan of National Salvation Party
