= 28–29 April events (Turkey) =

The 28–29 April events were organised by university students to support university lecturers and protest against the repressive policies of the Democrat Party (DP) on 28 April 1960 in Istanbul, and the following day in Ankara. Two students lost their lives after police opened fire on them, and around a hundred people were injured, among them Istanbul University rector Sıddık Sami Onar, while many academics were beaten by police. About a month after the demonstrations, the National Unity Committee overthrew the Democrat Party government in the 1960 Turkish coup d'état.

== Background ==
The policies adopted by the Democratic Party after 1959 began to cause economic and political problems. These created new tensions between political leaders and the military hierarchy, of concern to both university students and intellectual circles. Immediately before these disturbances, on 27 April 1960, the Democrat Party under Adnan Menderes held a vote in parliament to establish a Committee of Inquest to investigate government claims that the opposition Republican People's Party (CHP) was inciting rebellion. In parliament, both CHP and some DP deputies voted against the establishment of the Committee, but the majority voted for it on 28 April 1960. With the enactment of this law, the political atmosphere became even more tense. The National Unity Committee composed of low-ranking officers in the Turkish Armed Forces who were against the government became more determined to stage a coup, while university students protested against the "repressive" laws enacted by the government.

== Events ==
On 28 April 1960, university students gathered in the central building of Istanbul University, shouting "Down with the dictators!" and "We want freedom!" Security forces surrounding the protesting students opened fire to disperse them and Turan Emeksiz, a student of the Faculty of Forestry, was shot dead. Other students in the area were also beaten by police and dragged along the ground by police cars. Istanbul University rector Onar, who had asked the academics and police to leave the campus, was beaten by police. The events that started in the garden of the university then spread to Beyazıt Square. As the turmoil between the police and the students got out of hand, army units were called for reinforcement. Seeing the soldiers, the students began to chant "Long live the Turkish army, we are with the army". The soldiers and students then embraced each other. Most of the university students arrested by police and handed over to be taken to the Davut Pasha Barracks were instead released by the soldiers. Only forty students were taken to the barracks, where soldiers played football with them.

The events of 28 April are known as "Bloody Thursday". Due to the events, Istanbul University was closed for fifteen days. Istanbul was placed under curfew, martial law was declared, and newspapers were banned from publishing. The next day, on 29 April, the students continued their protests. At Sultanahmet Square on 30 April, a student from Istanbul High School, Nedim Özpolat, was fatally shot by the police.

Protests spread to Ankara on 29 April, when students at Ankara University Law School organised demonstrations against the government. Clashes broke out between students and the police. Security forces opened fire on students at the Faculty of Political Sciences and martial law was declared in Ankara.

== Aftermath ==
The 28–29 April incidents were the most important and largest student protest ever seen in Turkey. One week later, the first Turkish civil disobedience action, the 555k protests (held at 5 o'clock on the fifth of May), took place in Kızılay, Ankara.
