= Cemal Madanoğlu =

Turkish general

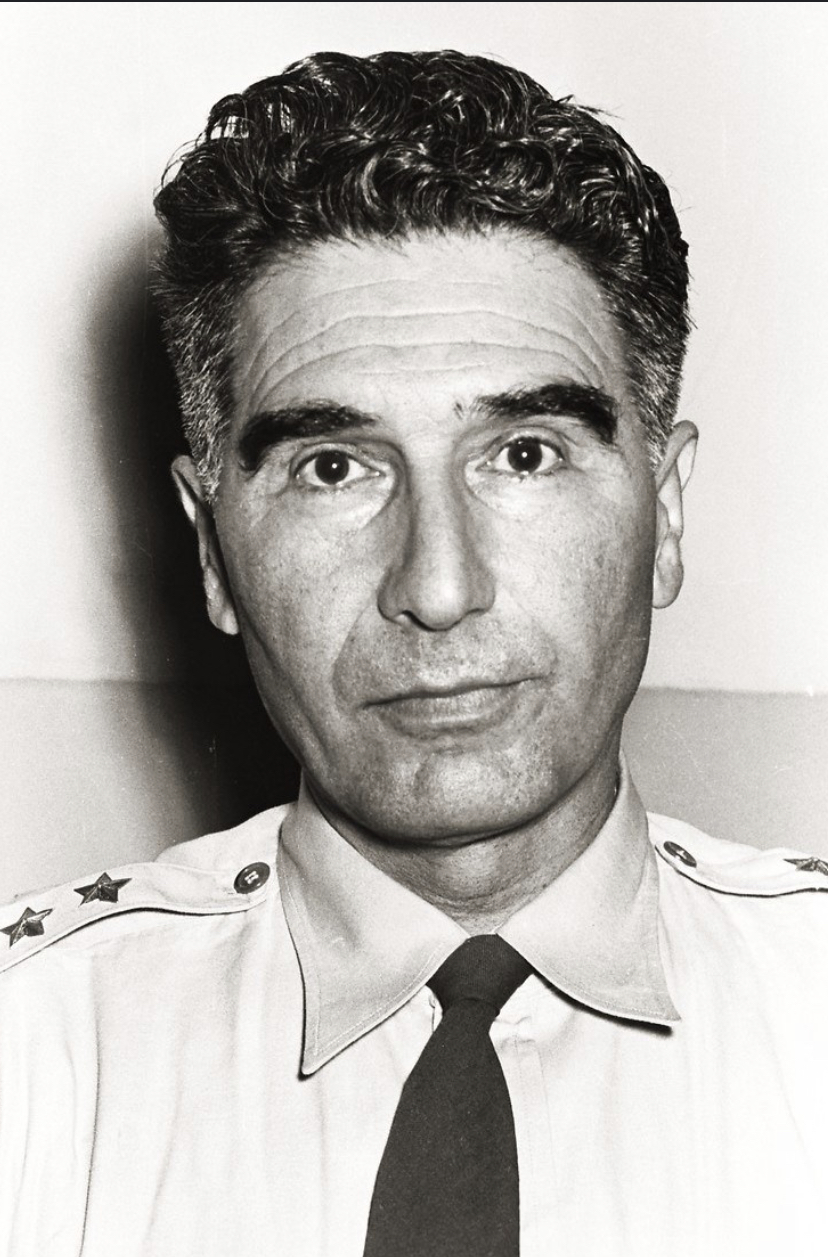
- Madanoğlu, 1960

Land Logistics Command of Turkey

Personal details
- Born: March 22, 1907 Eşme, Hüdavendigâr vilayet, Ottoman Empire
- Died: 28 July 1993 (aged 86)
- Party: National Unity Committee

Military service
- Allegiance: NATO Turkey Expanded Command Committee
- Branch/service: Turkish Army
- Years of service: 1926–1961
- Rank: Lieutenant general
- Unit: 12th Division Armored Training Division
- Battles/wars: Korean War; 1960 Turkish coup d'état 1971 Turkish military memorandum

Cemal Madanoğlu (22 March 1907 – 28 July 1993) was a Turkish soldier who was the de facto leader of the 1960 Turkish coup d'état.

== Early life ==
His father was Madanoğlu Mustafa, who is on the list of 150 personae non gratae. He was born in 1907 in Eşme district of Hüdavendigâr vilayet (now Uşak Province). He completed his primary school and secondary school in Istanbul.

== Military career ==
Madanoğlu graduated from the Kuleli Military High School in one year by skipping, thereafter he enrolled in the Military Academy in 1924. After graduating as an infantry second lieutenant in 1926, he continued at the Infantry School. He graduated from the War Academy, which he entered in 1938, in 1941. In between his time in these two institutions, he was stationed in several provinces, where he rose through the ranks. This trend continued through the 1940s

In 1953, he was appointed Deputy Commander of the Turkish Brigade in Korea. In 1954, he was promoted to the rank of brigadier general and appointed to the Commander of the 12th Division in Siirt. In 1956, he became the Deputy Chief of Staff of the 3rd Army in Erzurum. In 1957, he was promoted to the rank of major general and became the Chief of Staff of the 2nd Army in Konya. On January 15, 1958, he became the Commander of the Armored Soldier Training Division in Etimesgut, and on October 22, 1958, he became the Commander of the 10th Mountain Division in Elazığ. On October 1, 1959, he was appointed Head of Turkish Land Forces Logistics.

== Role in the 1960 Turkish coup d'état ==
Cemal Madanoğlu was among the leaders of the 1960 Turkish coup d'état. He was asked to lead the coup by his subordinates as he was the only General that was willing to take lead. During the coup, he was asked by the Army general Ragıp Gümüşpala on the telephone if he was the most senior among the putschists. Gümüşpala also said that he would not participate in the putsch if no one that outranked himself was present, other wise he'd march to put an end to the uprising. Madanoğlu bluffed that General Cemal Gürsel was their leader and he was on a flight to Ankara from İzmir.

Before the coup, he made every subordinate swear an oath not to take part in ministerial office. However, during a meeting with Cemal Gürsel, he noticed the same subordinates were trying to put together a government that included themselves. According to Madanoğlu, he slapped the table and said: “ You jackals! Which of you understands finance, which of you understands trade, which of you understands economy, we are in this position because Menderes did the same.”

He served on the National Unity Committee Security Commission. Along with his membership in the committee, he was promoted to the rank of lieutenant general on August 30, 1960 and assumed the Ankara Martial Law Command. Due to the disagreements between the members of the National Unity Committee, especially between Cemal Gürsel and himself, and as a result of the establishment of the Armed Forces Union and the request for his withdrawal from the martial law command, he resigned from his duties at the Ankara Martial Law Command on June 6, 1961, together with his membership in the Committee, and retired with the rank of Lieutenant General. He was accused of participating in the 1962 uprising, the 1963 uprising and the March 9, 1971 coup attempt.[2]

== Life after the coup d'état ==
After the coup, he released Democrat Party deputies and brought together Academicians from Istanbul University to provide the Junta with a roadmap back in to democracy. However, he then was advised by Professor Sıddık Sami Onar that the parliament should not be restored to power, and instead advised that they put Adnan Menderes and deputies of the Democrat Party on trial and enact structural reforms. Former President İsmet İnönü told him even if they were guilty there should be no execution. People would forget their crimes but would remember that they were hanged. After a slew of infighting in the military, he resigned.

== Later life and death ==
In retirement, Lieutenant general Madanoğlu was involved in a 1971 coup plot that would complete what the 1960 Turkish coup d'état could not finish in the means of reforms. This plan failed when the National Intelligence Organization bugged his meetings. General Faruk Gürler feared that his fellow plotters were more left-leaning than he assumed. This coup plot caused the 1971 Turkish military memorandum. Madanoğlu was a prominent figure in left-wing politics.

Madanoğlu gave a series of interviews regarding his part in the 1960 coup to 32. Gün. He died on 28 July 1993 in Istanbul. He is buried in Karacaahmet Cemetery.
