= 55s incident =

The 55s incident, also known as the Sivas Camp, is an event in the history of Turkey in which 55 aghas, sheikhs and tribal chiefs chosen from the east and southeast were exiled to Western Anatolia after the 27 May Coup.

The National Unity Committee accused the DP members of working to "establish a government in Kurdistan". On May 31, 1960, it was revealed that MBK found various documents on this subject in the newspaper Cumhuriyet and that Sheikh Said's son made propaganda trips to the east during the DP rule.

4 days after the coup, 485 aghas and sheikhs selected from the East and Southeast were sent to a camp in Sivas Kabak Yazi. It is claimed that Cemal Gürsel said let's deport 2500 prominent Kurds on this subject. The camp in Sivas was evacuated with the Compulsory Settlement Law No. 105 enacted on October 19, 1960, and deported to Antalya, Isparta, İzmir, Afyon, Manisa, Denizli and Çorum by the National Unity Committee, claiming that "55 aghas" were supporting the DP. This law was abolished in 1962.

== 'Kurdish movement' concern ==
The national liberation struggle initiated by the Kurdistan Democratic Party under the leadership of Mustafa Barzani in Northeastern Iraq also had an impact on the regions of Turkey such as Hakkari, Van, Siirt, Mardin, Diyarbakır, Muş, Şırnak, and the gathering activity for Barzani's struggle started in these regions. Mullah Mustafa Barzani was widely considered as a landlord, sheikh and tribal chief.

Some changes were made in the 1961 Constitution. The phrase "Sovereignty unconditionally belongs to the nation", which was the 3rd article of the 1924 Constitution, was changed to "Sovereignty unconditionally belongs to the Turkish nation".
