= Sunay =

Sunay is a Turkish name and may refer to:

== Given name ==
- Sunay Akın (born 1962), Turkish poet

== Surname ==
- Cevdet Sunay (1899–1982), Turkish army officer, political leader and the fifth President of Turkey,
- Atıfet Sunay (1903–2002), fifth First Lady of Turkey

== Other uses ==
- Sunay, a Uyghur musical instrument, similar to the Iranian sorna, Turkish zurna, and Chinese suona.
