= First ladies of Turkey =

Honorary title given to the wife of the Turkish president

First Lady of the Republic of Turkey
- Türkiye Cumhuriyeti Başbayanı
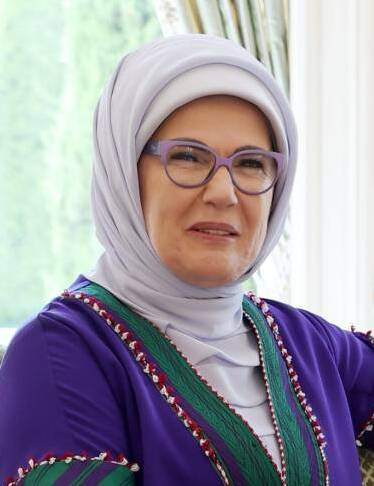
- Incumbent; Emine Erdoğan since 28 August 2014
- Style: Madame Erdoğan
- Residence: Presidential Complex
- Inaugural holder: Latife Uşşaki
- Formation: 29 October 1923

The first lady of the Republic of Turkey (Turkish: Türkiye Cumhuriyeti Başbayanı) is the wife of the president of Turkey. Twelve women have so far filled this role, the first being Latife Uşşaki. Since 2014, the First Lady has been Emine Erdoğan, wife of President Recep Tayyip Erdoğan.

== Officeholders ==
No.	Portrait	Name (Birth-Death)	Term in office			President	Note
No.	Portrait	Name (Birth-Death)	Term start	Term end	Time in office	President	Note
1		Latife Uşşaki (1898–1975)	29 October 1923	5 August 1925	1 year, 280 days	Mustafa Kemal Atatürk	(Note: Her husband divorced her during his second year as president.)
2		Mevhibe İnönü (1897–1992)	11 November 1938	27 May 1950	11 years, 197 days	İsmet İnönü	
3		Reşide Bayar (1886–1962)	22 May 1950	27 May 1960	10 years, 5 days	Celal Bayar	
4		Melahat Gürsel (1899–1974)	27 May 1960	28 March 1966	5 years, 305 days	Cemal Gürsel	
5		Atıfet Sunay (1904–2002)	28 March 1966	28 March 1973	7 years, 0 days	Cevdet Sunay	
6		Emel Korutürk (1915–2013)	6 April 1973	6 April 1980	7 years, 0 days	Fahri Korutürk	
7		Sekine Evren (1922–1982)	12 September 1980	3 March 1982	1 year, 172 days	Kenan Evren	(Note: She refused to fulfill her role of First Lady because she did not recognize the coup in which her husband seized power and died during the second year of his presidency.)
8		Semra Özal (born 1934)	9 November 1989	17 April 1993	3 years, 159 days	Turgut Özal	
9		Nazmiye Demirel (1927–2013)	16 May 1993	16 May 2000	7 years, 0 days	Süleyman Demirel	
10		Semra Sezer (born 1944)	16 May 2000	28 August 2007	7 years, 104 days	Ahmet Necdet Sezer	
11		Hayrünnisa Gül (born 1964)	28 August 2007	28 August 2014	7 years, 0 days	Abdullah Gül	
12		Emine Erdoğan (born 1956)	28 August 2014	Incumbent	12 years, 43 days	Recep Tayyip Erdoğan	

== See also ==
- Turkey
- President of Turkey
- First Lady
