= 1963 Turkish coup attempt =

Failed military coup against İsmet İnönü

1963 Turkish coup d'etat attempt
Date	20 May 1963
Location	Ankara, Turkey
Result	Coup unsuccessful

Belligerents
27th government of Turkey	Turkish Land Forces (faction)

Commanders and leaders
Cemal Gürsel İsmet İnönü	Col. Talat Aydemir (executed) Maj. Fethi Gürcan (executed)

The 1963 Turkish coup attempt (Turkish: 20 Mayıs 1963 ayaklanması) was a failed coup d'état in Turkey by a group of dissident military officers, led by Colonel Talat Aydemir, former Commandant of the Turkish Military Academy, along with his chief associate Major Fethi Gürcan. The second and final coup attempt to be orchestrated by the colonel, it aimed to overthrow the coalition government headed by İsmet İnönü. Unlike the initial lenience shown by the government to the rebels following the 1962 coup attempt, where they were granted a full pardon, a harsher approach was taken instead this time. Colonel Aydemir and Major Gürcan were tried, sentenced to death, then executed the following year.

== Background and motivation ==
Staff Colonel Talat Aydemir had been dismissed from the army and sent into retirement after the coup attempt on February 22, 1962, but he had continued his plans for a new attempt. The broad political context for the 1963 attempted coup was similar to that which led to the 1962 attempt. A group of junior officers felt that the military government installed after the 1960 coup had returned power to the civilian authorities too quickly; that the politicians of the Democrat Party were being rehabilitated too quickly, and that the army was not acting as an effective guarantor of the values of Kemal Atatürk.

Prime Minister İsmet İnönü was forced to resign in June 1962, in part because of the instability caused by the 1962 attempted coup. The 27th government of Turkey was once again based on a coalition since İnönü’s Republican People’s Party did not command a majority.

On 22 March 1963, Ex-President Celal Bayar was temporarily released from Kayseri prison, and was warmly received by large crowds when he arrived in Ankara, to the anger and consternation of those who had supported the 1960 coup.

In November 1960, fourteen radical officers had been removed from the military National Unity Committee that had seized power in the coup of the previous May. The officers had all been assigned overseas posts to keep them away from political activities in Turkey. However, in 1963 they began to return to the country.

Some have maintained that for Talat Aydemir there was a clear personal agenda in his second coup attempt. After 22 February 1962 prime minister İnönü had made a number of public statements about him which he regarded as belittling and dishonourable.

== Coup attempt ==
Planning for the coup attempt reportedly began just three months after the foiled 1962 coup, with Colonel Aydemir recruiting veterans and active-duty personnel who participated in previous coups. The core group of conspirators, dubbed the "February 22ers", used the "Tentacle System" as their organizational structure, extending secret arms from the central group to key military units in Istanbul and Ankara. Military officers sympathetic to their cause were enlisted into these units, forming a network support within the Armed Forces. The movement from its inception was marred with leadership disputes, with the first organizational meeting marked with disagreements over the choice of leader. Ultimately, Colonel Aydemir and Major Fethi Gürcan emerged as the de facto leaders.

Efforts were also made to unify with other conspiratorial group, namely the "14", a group of military officers purged from the National Unity Committee in November 1960, and the "11", a group of former air force officers. These attempts at unity ended in abject failure however, primarily due to Aydemir's insistence on primary leadership which caused frustrations during negotiations with the other groups. The summit meeting held in Dikmen between Aydemir and Alparslan Türkeş, leader of the 14, caused further splits within the conspirators. The 14 became divided between the Türkeş faction and the Orhan Kabibay faction, while the February 22ers split between Aydemir and Dündar Seyhan supporters.

On April 27, Seyhan, Kabibay, and Halim Menteş, the latter of whom being the leader of the 11, met at the Pierre Loti Hotel in Istanbul. There they concluded that Türkeş and Aydemir would be excluded from future activities, agreeing that a revolt was necessary before the 1965 elections.

Upon hearing the results of the Pierre Loti meeting, Colonel Aydemir decided to act independently and launch the coup attempt without further delay, mobilizing the Tentacle System by the evening of May 20. The colonel and his chief collaborators, in their old uniforms, entered the Turkish Military Academy and misled the cadets into joining, claiming the entire armed forces were rising up. Simultaneously, Aydemir's allies in Ankara and Istanbul mobilized forces and began converging to strategic locations.

By midnight, the rebels had seized control of the radio station, announcing that Aydemir had taken over the government on behalf of the army, dissolving parliament and abolishing political parties. Lieutenant-Colonel Ali Elverdi, a loyalist, managed to infiltrate into the studio and broadcast a denial of the colonel's claims, calling for loyal forces to rally. While dissident forces managed to arrest Elverdi, his broadcast had already been aired. As a result, loyal air units flew over Ankara instead of the expected pro-Aydemir units.

Support for the coup did not materialize, and the cadets, realizing they had been deceived, began to disperse. By dawn, government forces had regained complete control. The brief clashes between government and rebel forces caused at least six deaths and 26 injuries. Aydemir himself escaped from the War College through a back door and took refuge in a friend's house. Here he was arrested while changing out of his uniform back into civilian clothes. Among those injured during the attempted coup was the commandant of the War College, who had been shot in the leg by one of his own cadets while trying to make them surrender. Martial law was temporarily imposed in the cities Istanbul, Ankara, and Izmir, by the Supreme Military Council.

== Post-coup ==
Following the coup attempt, a series of trials named the Mamak trials were held to prosecute the dissidents, beginning on June 6 and continuing until early August. Verdicts were handed down on September 5. The proceedings, conducted with military discipline, were criticized by the defendants, who were limited to only one defense attorney each, leading them to challenge the court's legitimacy.

Aydemir and his associates, rather than mounting a defense, instead admitted and expressed pride in their actions, attempting unsuccessfully to implicate top officials into the coup. Aydemir's statements often contradicted defendants who had denied involvement. Lesser figures within the conspiracy and active officers claimed they were deceived or just following orders, which strong evidence often refuted.

Ultimately, seven defendants, including Colonel Aydemir and Major Fethi Gürcan, were sentenced to death, 29 were sentenced to life imprisonment, 12 received fifteen-year terms, and 58 were convicted with varying terms ranging from three months to twelve years. The remaining 45 were acquitted.

Among the cadets, who were tried separately, 166 were convicted while 1293 were acquitted. Administrative disciplinary action was recommended for 763 of the acquitted while all 1,459 involved cadets were expelled from the Turkish Military Academy.

On June 26, President Cemal Gürsel signed the death warrants for Colonel Aydemir and Major Fethi Gurcan, with the Turkish Parliament ratifying their death sentences shortly after. Refused execution by firing squad, a privilege reserved only for serving officers, they were to be hanged instead. Both were scheduled to be executed on June 27, yet the colonel's execution was temporarily postponed due to a successful plea for reprieve by his attorney. The major was executed as planned. On June 4, 1964, the military courts rejected Colonel Aydemir's plea for clemency. On the following day, he was hanged at the Central Prison in Ankara.

Alparslan Türkeş, who opposed Colonel Aydemir's plans, was arrested but later acquitted in the Mamak trials for his role in leaking the plot to the government. Similarly, Dundar Seyhan was initially arrested but also acquitted in the trials.

== See also ==
- Politics of Turkey
