= Ragıp Gümüşpala =

11th Chief of the General Staff of the Turkish Armed Forces (1960)

Chairman of Justice Party
- In office 11 February 1961 – 6 June 1964
- Preceded by: Office established
- Succeeded by: Süleyman Demirel

11th Chief of the General Staff of Turkey
- In office 3 June 1960 – 4 August 1960
- President: Celâl Bayar

Commander of the Turkish Army
- In office 21 August 1958 – 3 June 1960
- Preceded by: Cemal Gürsel
- Succeeded by: Celal Alkoç

Personal details
- Born: 1897 Edirne, Ottoman Empire
- Died: 6 June 1964 (aged 67) Istanbul, Turkey
- Education: Turkish Military Academy

Military service
- Allegiance: Ottoman Empire (1917–1920); Turkey (1920–1960)
- Branch/service: (Ottoman Empire) Ottoman Army; Turkish Land Forces
- Years of service: 1917–1960 (43 years)
- Rank: General

Ragıp Gümüşpala (1897 – 6 June 1964) was the 11th Chief of the General Staff of the Turkish Armed Forces and founder of the Justice Party in 1961. He died shortly afterwards, on 6 June 1964, in Istanbul.

== Biography ==
=== Military life ===
While he was a student at Edirne High School, he climbed into Talimgâha and in 1917 he was promoted to the rank of lieutenant. While he was Deputy Commander of the 63rd Regiment of the 12th Division, he was captured by the British Empire on 2 October 1918 during the Battle of Nablus on the Sinai and Palestine campaign. He remained in captivity until 6 October 1920. He returned from Istanbul to Ankara and joined the War of Independence on 13 December 1920. For his contributions to the National Struggle, he was awarded with the Medal of Independence with Red Ribbon. After serving as Team and Company Commander, he graduated from the Turkish Military Academy, which he entered in 1931, and became a staff officer in the same year.

After serving in various headquarters and units, he was promoted to the rank of brigadier general in 1948, major general in 1951, lieutenant general in 1955 and general in 1959. With the rank of Brigadier General, 65th Division Infantry Brigade Command, Motorized Units School Command, 9th Division Deputy Commander and 3rd Army Chief of Staff, 65th Division Command with the rank of Major General and Deputy Commander of the 2nd Corps, 7th Corps Command and 3rd Army Corps with the rank of Lieutenant General. He served as the Deputy Commander of the Army.

In 1960, while he was Commander of the 3rd Army in the rank of general, the 1960 Turkish coup d'état happened. He asked the National Unity Committee, which made the coup in Ankara, who their leader was, and informed that if their leader was not a senior general, he would march to Ankara with the 3rd Army under his command and put an end to the rebellion. Thereupon, the juntaists brought retired general Cemal Gürsel from Izmir to Ankara by military plane and showed him the leader instead of Major General Cemal Madanoğlu, who was the most senior of the coup. He was appointed Chief of General Staff on 3 June 1960. On 2 August 1960, he was ex officio retired by the National Unity Committee, together with about 5000 officers who would later form the Retired Revolution Officers Association (EMINSU).

=== Political life ===
He entered politics after military service. After the closure of the Democrat Party (DP) on 29 September 1960, he participated in the work of a political party that would gather the electorate of this party. He was elected as the first chairman of the Justice Party (AP), which was founded on 11 February 1961. As the first chairman of this party, he was elected as Izmir deputy in the 1961 general elections. He did not take part in the CHP-AP coalition government established on 20 November 1961 under the chairmanship of İsmet İnönü. He was re-elected as the chairman of the 1st Congress of the AP that convened in 1962.

He died in Istanbul on 6 June 1964. His grave is in Zincirlikuyu Cemetery. He was married with six children.

After his death, Süleyman Demirel was elected as the Justice Party leader. Perceived as the continuation of the Democrat Party, AP came to power alone with 52% of the votes in the 1965 elections.

Military offices
Preceded by Cemal Gürsel	Commander of the Third Army; 29 August 1958–5 June 1960	Succeeded by Daniyal Yurdatapan
Preceded by Rüştü Erdelhun	Chief of the General Staff of Turkey; 3 June 1960–4 August 1960	Succeeded by Cevdet Sunay
