= Melahat Gürsel =

First Lady of Turkey from 1960 to 1966

First Lady of Turkey
- In role 27 May 1960 – 28 March 1966
- President: Cemal Gürsel
- Preceded by: Reşide Bayar
- Succeeded by: Atıfet Sunay

Personal details
- Born: 1899 Ottoman Empire
- Died: 23 February 1974 (aged 74–75) Karşıyaka, Izmir, Turkey
- Resting place: Zincirlikuyu Cemetery, Istanbul
- Spouse: Cemal Gürsel (m. 1927; died 1966)
- Children: 1 (biological), 2 (adopted)

Melahat Gürsel (1899 – 23 February 1974) was the first lady of Turkey from 27 May 1960 until 28 March 1966 during the presidency of her husband Cemal Gürsel.

Melahat was born in 1899. Her father was the chief engineer on the Ottoman cruiser Hamidiye. In 1927, she married army officer Cemal Bey, who was introduced to her by the older brother. From this marriage, a son Özdemir was born and the couple also adopted two daughters, Hatice and Türkan.

On 27 May 1960, some mid-ranked Turkish Army officers staged a military coup, and overthrew the government. Four-star general Cemal Gürsel, then Commander of the Turkish Army, was appointed head of the state by the revolutionaries without a leader. He remained in office until his presidency was ended by the Grand National Assembly of Turkey on 28 March 1966 due to his illness.

Gürsel was known as an economizing and proud woman. Also during her time as the First Lady, Melahat Gürsel remained a modest housewife, cooking food in the kitchen despite the cooks employed in the presidential palace Çankaya Mansion, and sewing her daily dresses. She did not accompany her husband at official visits at home or abroad to help the state saves money. She handed over the presents to the state, which were officially given to her.

She died at the age of 75 in her home at Deniz Bostanlı neighborhood of Karşıyaka, Izmir at 11:30 on 23 February 1974. Her body was transferred next day to Istanbul, and was interred at the Zincirlikuyu Cemetery following the religious funeral.
