= Public holidays in Turkey =

The official holidays in Turkey are established by the Act 2429 of 19 March 1981 that replaced the Act 2739 of 27 May 1935. These holidays can be grouped into national and religious holidays, which in total equal 15.5 days of public holiday in a calendar year.

== List ==
General holidays
Official holidays
National holidays
Religious holidays

=== Available holidays ===
Date	English name	Local name	Remarks
1 January	New Year's Day	Yılbaşı	First day of the Gregorian new year
23 April	National Sovereignty and Children's Day	Ulusal Egemenlik ve Çocuk Bayramı	Commemoration of the first opening of the Grand National Assembly of Turkey at Ankara in 1920. Dedicated to the children.
1 May	Labor and Solidarity Day	Emek ve Dayanışma Günü	May Day
19 May	Commemoration of Atatürk, Youth and Sports Day	Atatürk'ü Anma, Gençlik ve Spor Bayramı	Commemoration of the beginning of national liberation movement initiated in 1919 by Atatürk's landing in Samsun. Dedicated to the youth.
15 July	Democracy and National Unity Day	Demokrasi ve Millî Birlik Günü	Commemoration of the national unity for democracy against the coup d'état attempt in 2016.
30 August	Victory Day	Zafer Bayramı	Commemoration of the victory at the final battle in Dumlupınar, ending the Turkish Independence War in 1922, dedicated to the armed forces.
29 October	Republic Day	Cumhuriyet Bayramı	Commemoration of the proclamation of the republic in 1923. Also the halfday in the afternoon of the previous day.
1–3 Shawwal (Note: Since 1 yr. equals to 354 days 8 hr. and 48 min. in the Islamic calendar, the dates of Islamic feasts shift each year with respect to the Gregorian calendar.)	Ramadan Feast	Ramazan Bayramı	Religious holiday for 3 days. Also the halfday in the afternoon of the previous day.
10–13 Dhu'l-Hijjah	Sacrifice Feast	Kurban Bayramı	Religious holiday for 4 days in hajj period. Also the halfday in the afternoon of the previous day.

=== Former holidays ===
Date	English name	Local name	Remarks
27 May	Freedom and Constitution Day	Hürriyet ve Anayasa Bayramı	Commemoration of the 1960 coup d'état. Observed between 1963 and 1981.
24 July	İyd-i Millî	İyd-i Millî	Celebration of Second Constitutional Era. Observed between 1909 and 1934.

== Minority holidays ==
In May 2021, Turkish president Recep Tayyip Erdoğan announced a new Human Rights Action Plan. According to the plan "public and private sector staff and students will be allowed to take leave for the religious holidays that they observe, regardless of their faith."
