= 555k protests =

1960 protests in Ankara, Turkey

The 555K protests were the first example of civil disobedience in the history of Turkey. They were organised by students for 5pm on 5 May 1960 in Kızılay, Ankara to protest against the ruling Democrat Party.

== Events ==
The death of two students in the clashes between the police and the students during the 28-29 April events made the atmosphere in the country very tense. A group of young people decided to organise a protest. They mobilised others by word of mouth with the watchword "555k" - that is at 5pm on 5 May in Kızılay, but the details of exactly how or where the protest was to begin were unknown to those attending.

At the agreed time, Cemal Süreya, Altan Öymen and their friends were ready for action but when none took initiative to start the protest they began it themselves around half past five. Arm in arm, they and their fellow students began whistling the Plevna March. As they walked, the pedestrians they passed made way for them, and some started to follow them. Their numbers grew steadily. After a while, the activists reached Zafer Square and returned to Kızılay. However, by this time, the police had already been stationed in Kızılay to disperse the protesters. They intervened in the demonstration, trying to break it up while the Plevna March continued to break out here and there all around them.

At that time, the cars of President Celal Bayar, Prime Minister Adnan Menderes and Assembly Speaker Refik Koraltan were nearby as they were returning from the Assembly. Bayar and Menderes, who learned that there was a protest in Kızılay, wanted to see what was going on. As soon as they reached the square, howls of protest, booing and slogans went up. Menderes got out of his car and angrily confronted the protesters, challenging them and cursing them. He shouted: "Are you going to kill me? Come on, kill me!" The protesters replied: "We are not murderers, the government are murderers!"

The police eventually managed to get Menderes into a vehicle belonging to Hürriyet Ankara Representative Emin Karakuş. While getting into the car, Menderes angrily banged on its inside ceiling. As soon as he was safely inside, Karakuş accelerated, broke through the crowd and left the square.

During the protest, Menderes asked one of the students "What do you want?" (According to some rumors, the person he spoke to was former CHP Chairman Deniz Baykal, a student at that time, or alternatively, according to the poet Cemal Süreya, it was Vedat Dalokay). In answer, the student grabbed the Prime Minister's collar and said, "We want freedom!" Menderes replied "You're holding onto the collar of the Prime Minister. Is there any greater freedom than that?"

== Slogans ==
University students gathered in the square and sang the Plevna March to these words:

"Olur mu böyle olur mu?
Kardeş kardeşi vurur mu?
Kahrolası diktatörler.
Bu dünya size kalır mı?
Kızılırmak akmam diyor.
Etrafını yıkmam diyor."

"Is it okay? Is it okay?
Does brother shoot brother?
Damn dictators.
Will this world be yours?
The Kızılırmak River says it won't flow,

It won't destroy its surroundings."

== Aftermath ==
After the protests, the conditions of martial law were further tightened. It was forbidden for more than 10 people to gather in Ankara; broadcast bans were brought in one after another; and those who took part in the protests were detained. The statements of DP members, especially Menderes, became much harsher; indeed he called on his supporters to "punish" the protesters.

About 20 days after the 555K protests, on May 27, the 1960 Turkish coup d'état took place, the first military intervention in the history of the republic.

The poet Cemal Süreya, who participated in the action, later wrote the poem 555K.

== See also ==
- 28-29 April events (Turkey)
- 1960 Turkish coup d'état
