= Talât Aydemir =

Turkish officer who led unsuccessful military coup attempts

Ahmet Talât Aydemir (1917 in Söğüt – 5 July 1964 in Altındağ) was a Turkish officer who led two unsuccessful military coup attempts on February 22, 1962 and May 20, 1963 and was executed for his part in them.

== Early life and education ==
Aydemir was the son of a war-wounded Major, Necip Aydemir. On his mother’s side he was the nephew of Çerkes Ethem and his sister Fahriye was married to Hakkı Alican, the older brother of finance minister Ekrem Alican.

He attended primary school at the Cumhuriyet School in Adapazarı and secondary school at Kadıköy Boys' High School. He entered Kuleli Military High School on September 1, 1934 and transferred to the Turkish Military Academy on May 5, 1937. On May 31, 1939, he graduated as a second lieutenant and began attending the Artillery School in Halıcıoğlu. He was promoted to lieutenant on November 30, 1939 and assigned to the 43rd Artillery Battery in Kırklareli on October 11, 1940. He was then promoted to first lieutenant in 1943 and to captain in 1947, the same year in which he passed the entrance exam for the Army War Institute.

He began his studies there in 1948, graduating in 1949 as an assistant staff officer. He was assigned to the 12th Division in Sivas where he became commander of an artillery detachment. While serving he attended a course in military doctrine at the Military Academy. Graduating in August 1954, he was stationed in Ankara and was soon appointed to the Planning Branch of the General Staff Logistics Directorate. In 1955 he was promoted to Major in 1955 and attended a one-year language course at Saint Benoit French High School. He entered the Joint Academy on October 1, 1956 and graduated on March 1, 1957. On May 1, 1957, he went to France on a three-month training course and in 1958 was promoted to lieutenant colonel. In June 1959 he took command of the 3rd Division Korean Brigade and spent a year there, returning to Turkey on August 8, 1960. He was promoted to colonel on August 30, 1960. On September 12, 1960, he was appointed as the Commander of the Military Academy.

== Political activity before 1962 ==
Between 1956 and 1959, Aydemir was a member of the group of officers conspiring to stage a coup against Turkey’s Democratic Party government. However as he was in Korea at the time, he did not take part in the 1960 Turkish coup d'état.

Aydemir was not a member of the National Unity Committee but he was a supporter of its more "radical" members, known as “the Fourteen”. At the end of 1960, the "moderate" wing of the Committee expelled the "radical" wing, and the Fourteen were dispersed around the world as political advisors to various Turkish embassies.

== Attempted coup of 1962 ==
The indecisive outcome of the first post-coup elections on October 15, 1961 led to increased discontent within the army and a group of officers organised what they called the Armed Forces Union (Silahlı Kuvvetler Birliği). The government led by İsmet İnönü tried to dissuade these officers from taking action, but when it was clear their advice was being ignored, they prepared to assign the ringleaders, including Aydemir, to new posts far from the capital.

Knowing that Aydemir and his associates were planning a coup, his relative the politician Ekrem Alican offered to try and dissuade him, but his effort was unsuccessful. To pre-empt the dispersal of his co-conspirators, Aydemir organized a coup attempt on February 22, 1962, with the participation of some of the military units in Ankara. However most of the army sided with İsmet İnönü, compelling Aydemir to surrender in return for an assurance that the leaders of the coup would not be tried or punished. He was arrested on July 9, 1962, for "praising an act that is considered a crime by law”, held in prison for only nine days, and released on July 18.

== Attempted coup of 1963 ==
Aydemir continued to plot a coup after his release. On May 20, 1963, he mounted his second coup attempt with the participation of the Military Academy, on the grounds that the reforms envisaged in the Constitution were not being implemented. This attempt was also suppressed by the İnönü government.

== Trial and execution ==
Aydemir was tried along with many officers, Military Academy cadets and some of the Fourteen. After the trial, he was sentenced to death along with Cavalry Major Fethi Gürcan on September 5, 1963, for "attempting to amend and falsify the constitution". The death sentences of Fevzi Bingöl and Osman Deniz were commuted to life imprisonment.

After the Turkish Grand National Assembly approved the decision, the death penalty became final on March 11, 1964. Although he was taken from his cell in the morning of June 27, 1964, and brought to the prison warden's room for execution, the execution was postponed with a last-minute application made by his lawyer. After these last legal attempts failed, he was executed by hanging in Ankara Central Prison on July 5, 1964.

In his will, he wrote that he wanted to be buried at the Military Academy, where he had served as the commander, but this request was not fulfilled. The last book he was reading was "Revolutionary Writings" by Gracchus Babeuf. After the book was found in his cell, it was confiscated and banned by the government.

== Family ==
Talât Aydemir was married to Şadan Aydemir, with whom he had two children, Tülin and Metin. Şadan Aydemir died in 2001. Tülin Aydemir never married and died in 2004. Metin Aydemir lived in Datça with his wife.

== Legacy ==
Aydemir wrote his memoirs while he was in prison. The first volume was smuggled out of the prison by Fethi Gürcan's children Öner and Sema. However his guards discovered soldiers the second volume, which was thought to be lost until its 2010 publication.

Part of his memoirs were published in Akşam newspaper in 1965, and the first volume was published by MAY Publications under the name Talât Aydemir’s Memoirs (Turkish: Talât Aydemir’in Hatıraları). All of his memoirs, written in his own handwriting, were published under the title My Memoirs (Turkish: Hatıratım) by Yapı Kredi Yayınları in 2010.

== See also ==
- 1962 Turkish coup attempt
- 1963 Turkish coup attempt
