= Rüştü Erdelhun =

10th Chief of the General Staff of the Turkish Armed Forces from 1958 to 1960

Chairman of the NATO Military Committee
- In office 23 February 1960 – 3 June 1960
- Preceded by: J. A. Beleza Ferraz
- Succeeded by: Louis Mountbatten

10th Chief of the Turkish General Staff
- In office 23 August 1958 – 27 May 1960
- Preceded by: Feyzi Mengüç
- Succeeded by: Ragıp Gümüşpala

Personal details
- Born: Mustafa Rüşdü; 1894 Edirne, Ottoman Empire
- Died: 9 November 1983 (aged 88–89) Istanbul, Turkey
- Resting place: Cebeci Asri Cemetery
- Spouse: Vasfiye Erdelhun
- Education: Turkish Military Academy; Turkish Army War Institute
- Awards: See below

Military service
- Allegiance: Ottoman Empire; Turkey (from 1921)
- Branch/service: Turkish Land Forces
- Years of service: 1914-1960
- Rank: General
- Commands: Chief of the Turkish General Staff; Commander of the Turkish Land Forces; Second Army; 18th Corps
- Battles/wars: World War I Turkish War of Independence

Mustafa Rüştü Erdelhun (1894 – 9 November 1983) was a Turkish general who served as the 10th chief of the Turkish General Staff in the Turkish Armed Forces from 23 August 1958 to 27 May 1960, and the 9th commander of the Turkish Land Forces from 1 August 1958 to 21 August 1958. He also served as commander of the 18th Corps, the Second Army and was chairman of the NATO Military Committee from 23 February 1960 to 3 June 1960.

== Biography ==
A graduate of the Turkish Military Academy in 1914 and as a staff officer in 1926, he was born in Edirne while his parents were born in Romania. They later migrated to Thrace. Erdelhun participated in the First World War and the Turkish War of Independence. Prior to serving as a team commander in Artillery and Adjutant units, he went to Anatolia in 1921 where he formally joined the Turkish Army with the İzmir Weapons Commission. He was promoted to the rank of brigadier general in 1945, major general in 1947, lieutenant general in 1952, and general in 1956.

He took several assignments during his career, including chief of staff of the Guard Company Command's 8th Division, faculty member of Turkish War Academies, battalion commander in the 61st and 121st field artillery regiment. He also commanded branch office at the General Staff headquarters.

He was later transferred to Tokyo where he represented the country as a military attaché and with the second appointment in London. He was also appointed as a deputy commander of the 43rd Field Artillery Regiment stationed in Rome.

As a brigadier general he commanded the 15th Brigade and the Training department of Chief of General Staff. As a major general he commanded the 6th and 51st Division Command and became a member of the MSB Istanbul Investigation Board. As a lieutenant general he was appointed as the head of Tokyo Liaison Committee, in addition to commanding the 18th Corps.

Erdelhun was reportedly approached by a group of dissident officers and asked to assume a leadership role in their planned coup, a request he declined. On the night of the 1960 Turkish coup d'état, he was arrested and later tried before the Yassıada trials. He was initially sentenced to death, a penalty that was subsequently commuted to life imprisonment. In 1964, he was released following a presidential pardon issued by Cemal Gürsel. While imprisoned in Kayseri, Erdelhun wrote to his family that he was “grateful not to have involved the military in politics during his tenure” and that “history would ultimately judge his actions.” With the consent of the General Staff and the National Defense Ministry, Erdelhun’s rank was reinstated together with that of 9 other generals on February 6, 1967.

He died on 9 November 1983 at the age of 89 in the Kabataş, Istanbul.

== Personal life ==
Erdelhun was a polyglot and was known to speak English, French, Japanese, German, Arabic and Russian.

== Awards and decorations ==
- Ottoman Empire: Order of the Medjidie
- German Empire: Iron Cross
- Turkey: Medal of Independence
- Turkey: Turkish Armed Forces Medal of Honor
- United States of America: Legion of Merit
- South Korea: Order of Military Merit
