= 1962 Turkish coup attempt =

1962 Turkish coup d'etat attempt
Date	22 February 1962
Location	Ankara, Turkey
Result	Coup unsuccessful

Belligerents
26th government of Turkey	Turkish Land Forces (faction)

Commanders and leaders
Cemal Gürsel İsmet İnönü Fethi Gürcan	Col. Talat Aydemir Gen. Faruk Güventürk Lt Gen. Refik Tulga

Casualties and losses
- The officers who participated in the operation, Talat Aydemir, were retired. (surrendered)

The 1962 attempted coup in Turkey (also known as the February 22 Incident) was led by the Commander of the Turkish Military Academy, Staff Colonel Talat Aydemir and his associates, who were opposed to the democratically elected government in Turkey. Despite taking control of much of Ankara, the coup leaders quickly realised they could not prevail and surrendered without any loss of life occurring. Talat Aydemir went on to lead a further coup attempt in 1963.

== Background ==
=== The Armed Forces Union ===
Following the 1960 Turkish coup d'état, the military National Unity Committee (MBK) purged the formerly governing Democrat Party, oversaw the drafting of a new constitution and returned power to elected civilian authorities. Nevertheless, there were groups of junior officers who felt that the direction taken by the MBK was wrong, particularly after it had dismissed “the fourteen” hardline coup supporters on 13 November 1960.

Following the dismissal of the fourteen hardliners, the High Command continued to steadily remove officers whom it regarded as unreliable, and to make new appointments of those who would not oppose the return to democracy. While the process of handing over power from the army to the civilian authorities was underway, there were several indications of growing dissent. One was the creation of the Armed Forces Union (Turkish: Silahlı Kuvvetler Birliği) late in 1960 as a voice for officers pressing for a more radical policy. Its membership and aims were unclear and its existence at the time was little known outside the armed forces themselves.

=== June - July 1961 ===
Tension between the MBK and the Armed Forces Union first became public in June 1961, when airforce commander Irfan Tansel was removed from his military post and sent to Washington DC as an adviser to Turkey's military mission. There were rumours of a number of other dismissals and appointments, and Talat Aydemir was one of a group of officers who met in Ankara to agree a six-point protocol which they sent to the General Staff, demanding the reinstatement of Tansel, the cancellation of other dismissals and promotions, and no future interference from the MBK in military appointments. A squadron of jet fighters flew over Ankara to emphasise the seriousness of the Armed Forces Union's intentions.

Faced with this show of determination, the MBK agreed to the demands of the Armed Forces Union, but decided to also to issue a statement, through the General Staff, to all members of the armed forces. This statement, issued on 28 June 1961, offered assurances that the planned civilian regime would not be able to take action against the coup leaders of 1960, and that the sentences of the Yassıada trials would be carried out promptly.

In July, the junior officers’ concerns were increased when, in the referendum, the new military-approved constitution was only approved by 61.7% of voters. Following this, on 25 August 1961 members of the Armed Forces Union were required to swear an oath to support the work of the MBK.

=== The October Protocol ===
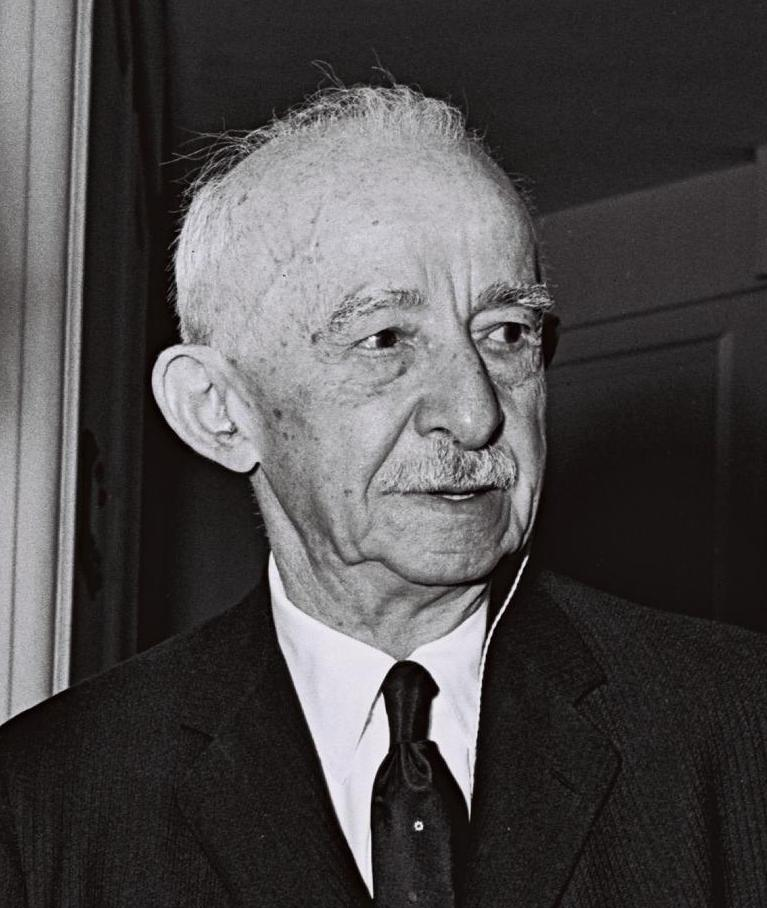
Prime Minister İsmet İnönü (1964)

In the October 1961 elections the Republican People's Party failed to win an outright majority and incoming prime minister İsmet İnönü was obliged to form a coalition government with the newly formed Justice Party, which effectively reconstituted the Democrat Party that had been removed from power by the 1960 coup. Overall, the majority of votes had gone to parties that claimed to be successors of the Democrats.

The general election result prompted Talat Aydemir and his associates to begin mobilising their supporters to use force to prevent the return to civilian rule. On 21 October 1961 a large meeting was held at the Turkish Military Academy in Istanbul, following which 10 Generals and 28 Colonels signed what became known as the October Protocol. According to this protocol, the military was to intervene before the newly elected Grand National Assembly of Turkey was convened - no later than 25 October 1961. However, those who signed it had no means of implementing it without the active support of senior officers.

Instead of supporting the junior officers, the army High Command intervened to oblige the leaders of the four largest parties to sign the Çankaya Protocol, guaranteeing the continuation of the reforms instituted after the coup, granting immunity to those who had led it, and agreeing not to stand any candidates for the presidency against Cemal Gürsel. The junior officers were unable to do anything to prevent the recently elected coalition government from taking power.

Once the civilian government was installed, the concerns of Aydemir and his colleagues seemed well-founded. Politicians who had been removed from office by the 1960 coup were preparing to make a rapid return to public life: the newly formed Justice Party began examining possible grounds for the pardon of those still held in detention after the Yassiada trials. A particular flashpoint was the funeral of the Democrat Party's Minister of National Education, Tevfik İleri which saw young people protesting against the coup for the first time and demanding the release of political prisoners.

=== January - February 1962 ===
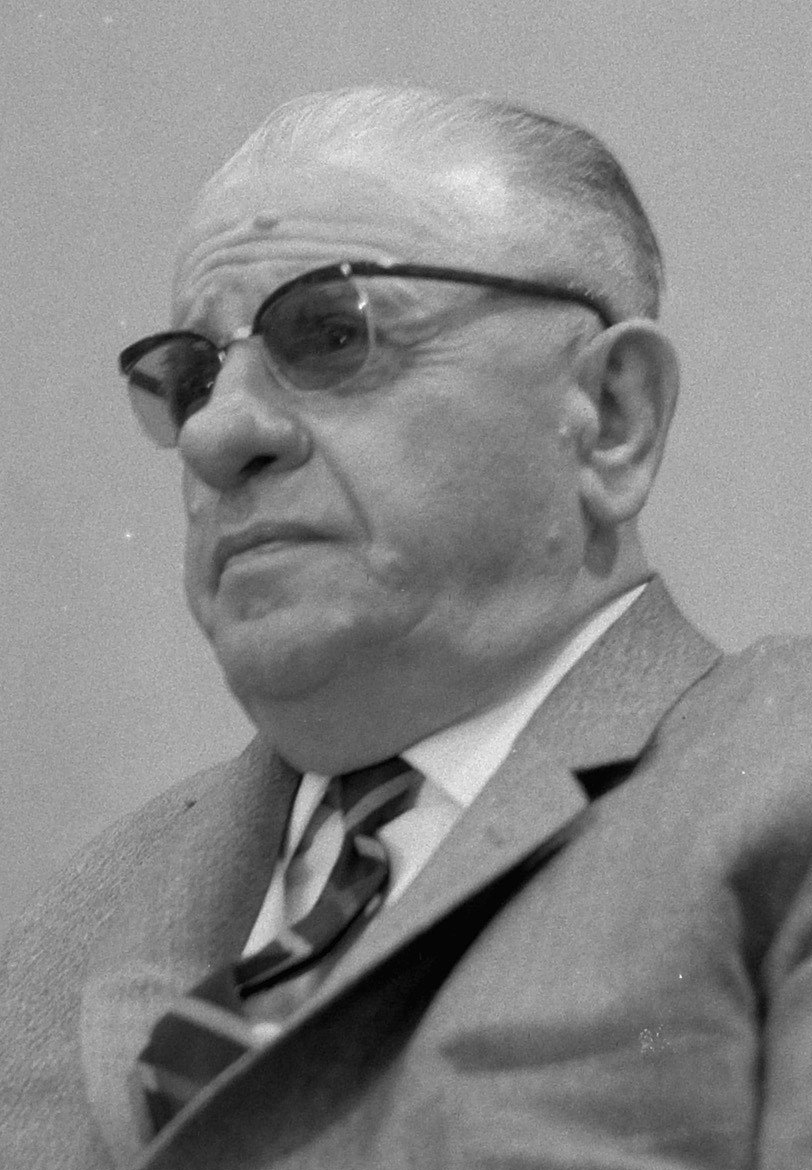
Cevdet Sunay (1964)

A grouping of military officers known as the "Extended Command Council" (Turkish: Genişletilmiş Komuta Konseyi) met at the General Staff Headquarters on 19 January 1962 to discuss a proposal from Chief of the General Staff Cevdet Sunay that they should abandon any thought of staging a military intervention and instead rally behind the government of İsmet İnönü. The Generals and Commanders at that meeting supported Sunay's proposal but Talat Aydemir and the Colonels who attended stated that they did not agree and that a military intervention was necessary. However, without the support of the Generals, especially the Chief of the General Staff, they would have been acting outside the chain of command if they tried to move on their own.

Prime Minister İnönü decided to try and defuse the tensions within the army by visiting military units in Istanbul and Ankara. He first visited the 66th Division Command and the War Academies in Istanbul. At the units he went to, he advised the officers to remain calm and patient, making clear that he did not support any action by them. This undermined the plans of those officers who believed that they should seize power in order to offer him their support. On February 5, 1962, he went to visit the Military Academy to meet cadets in Ankara, but no one received him other than the commanders and the inspection unit due to the deliberate effort of school commander Talat Aydemir who had sent the students away for a field exercise. As İnönü was preparing to leave the academy the cadets were returning and İnönü created a dramatic scene by jumping in front of them and saluting them.

On 9 February Lieutenant General tr:Refik Tulga convened a meeting in Balmumcu, Istanbul, that was attended by 59 officers. Thirty-seven of those attending, including Talat Aydemir, agreed on the need to carry out a military intervention before 28 February. Cevdet Sunay however refused to support overthrowing the government as long as Inönü, Atatürk's deputy, remained prime minister.

Instead, Sunay alerted İnönü to what Talat Aydemir and the other junior officers were planning. On February 18, 1962, Sunay also summoned the Corps Commanders of the 1st Army, the Governor of Istanbul, Lieutenant General Refik Tulga, the Commander of the War Academies Brigadier General tr:Faruk Güventürk and the Commander of the War Fleet to Ankara. These generals had previously met with Talat Aydemir and other radical colonels and made clear that they would not agree to support a new coup.

On February 19, 1962, Sunay also summoned Talat Aydemir, Necati Ünsalan and Selçuk Atakan to the General Staff Headquarters. Air Force Commander İrfan Tansel, Land Forces Commander Muhittin Önür, and Gendarmerie General Commander Abdurrahman Doruk Pasha were waiting for them here, but they were still unable to persuade the colonels to give up their plans. There now seemed no alternative but for the government and the High Command to take action against them.

== Attempted coup ==
=== False alarm, 20 February 1962 ===
Rumours began to spread through the army that Talat Aydemir and his associates were going to stage their coup on the night of February 20–21. In response, officers in the Etimesgut Armored Units School First Armoured Division Tank Battalion placed their troops on alert. Likewise, sections of the 229th Infantry Regiment and the Guard Regiment also prepared to join the coup. By the following morning it was clear that the rumour was unfounded.

Cevdet Sunay was enraged when he heard what had happened the previous night. He summoned Talat Aydemir and two other officers to General Staff Headquarters and advised them that they would immediately be transferred to new posts away from the capital, although Aydemir denied any wrongdoing or involvement in the previous night's events. At a meeting of the General Staff later on February 21, and orders were given for the transfer of officers causing unrest to units in the East. The list of names included including Selçuk Atakan, Emin Arat, İhsan Erkan, Haldun Doran and Şükrü İlkin (commander of the Presidential Guard Regiment) as well as Talat Aydemir.

=== Uprising ===
When Aydemir learned that the transfer order had been issued, he gathered about 600 recent graduates of the Military Academy and made a speech to them at 3pm, explaining the events of recent days. In his speech, Aydemir said:

“May 27 [i.e. the 1960 coup] failed to reach its goal. Parliament is not working. The army is being criticised. Now commanders are sent East to break up the forces at the ready. Our plans are ready, the army is with us. Our password is ‘Halaskar’ and our sign is ‘Fedailer’... If this action does not succeed, I will commit suicide.”

The expressions chosen as passwords and signs alluded to Enver Pasha and the 1913 Ottoman coup d'état that took place outside the chain of command.

The graduates agreed to support him and prepared to fight. The units that had responded to the false rumour on 19 February did not join in this time, as they had new officers in command. Nevertheless, Aydemir sent tanks from Military Academy towards the Turkish Grand National Assembly. The government placed anti-tank guns around the building. Soldiers from the barracks in Polatlı and Çubuk were called in to help break the siege, but all of the battalions called to suppress the coup sided with Talat Aydemir and declared their loyalty to him.

On the morning of 22 February the battalion guarding the parliament building went over to the rebels units loyal to Aydemir were effectively in control of central Ankara, including the radio station. Critically however, the Air Force remained loyal to the government, and this was to prove decisive. With unchallenged air superiority, İsmet Inönü's government made preparations to bomb the Army War College with jets from the Murted airbase.

Aydemir and his colleagues announced their aims as the dissolution of the Grand National Assembly, the resignation of the government and the passing of the administration to them through the suspension of the Constitution.

=== The Çankaya mansion ===
At noon on February 22 Cihat Alpan was appointed to replace Şükrü İlkin as commander of the Presidential Guard Regiment protecting the Çankaya Mansion. However, the cavalry group of the Guard Regiment under Major Fethi Gürcan detained Alpan and then found itself in control of President Cemal Gürsel, Prime Minister İnönü and several other ministers, Chief of General Staff Sunay and the force commanders, who were meeting inside the mansion at that time. Gürcan contacted Talat Aydemir and asked permission to arrest them all. Aydemir refused because he did not want his action to be seen as a coup, so he ordered Gürcan to release them all. As he left the mansion, İnönü smiled and said “Now they have lost.”

As soon as he left the Çankaya mansion, İnönü headed for the Airforce Command Building, where he met other party leaders as well as the Airforce commanders. The government's plan was now for President Gürsel and Prime Minister İnönü to make conciliatory speeches over the radio to try and de-escalate the situation. Mediation was established through Ekrem Alican, the leader of the New Turkey Party and a relative of Talat Aydemir, but this made little progress. Cemal Gürsel departed for Murted air base. When Fethi Gürcan seized the radio's transmitting station in Etimesgut with his troops, İnönü's broadcasts stopped, but he was able to resume his addresses through the transmitter at Ankara Esenboğa Airport a few hours later.

In his messages, İnönü stressed that providing no blood was shed, Aydemir and the other soldiers supporting the coup would not be punished. He refused however to consider any of the demands the coup leaders had made. It became clear to Aydemir that no further units were intending to join him, that his forces were surrounded, and that the government, political parties and High Command were steadily regaining the upper hand. He ordered the tanks in central Ankara to withdraw. On the evening of 22 February, the jets of the Air Force began to fly low over the Military Academy.

At 1am of 23 February, İnönü sent Aydemir a written note confirming that there would be no punishments if he and his followers gave up. Shortly afterwards Aydemir called on his followers to lay down their arms and return to barracks while he himself surrendered.

== Aftermath ==
When İnönü entered the Grand National Assembly on February 23, he was given an unprecedented standing ovation from deputies of all parties, who expressed their gratitude and confidence in the armed forces.

The students of the Military Academy were given a week's early leave and the school was temporarily closed and Semih Sancar was appointed to head it in place of Talat Aydemir. Aydemir, Emin Arat, Dündar Seyhan and Turgut Alpagut were kept under guard for a while, but there were no arrests. Fourteen officers were transferred while Aydemir and 22 others were retired from the army. Aydemir was arrested not for the attempted coup but for insulting İsmet İnönü and as detained in prison for just 9 days. İnönü's conciliatory approach avoided holding a number of trials that would have caused discord and embarrassment to a government working to restore calm and order following the return to civilian rule. Indeed, on 22 April İnönü managed to persuade the Turkish Grand National Assembly to pass an amnesty law that allowed them to return to the ranks. There was a political cost - in return for agreeing to amnesty the coup officers, the Justice Party demanded the early release of Democrat Party prisoners held in Kayseri prison since the 1960 coup. In fact the attempted coup, the pardon debates and the ensuing the party conflicts overwhelmed İnönü, who resigned on 30 May 1962.

Talat Aydemir continued to oppose the return to civilian rule and gave many interviews sharing his views in the months after his release. On May 20, 1963, he led a second attempted coup, and after this he was arrested, sentenced to death and executed.

== See also ==
- Politics of Turkey
