= Victory Day (Turkey) =

Public holiday in Turkiye

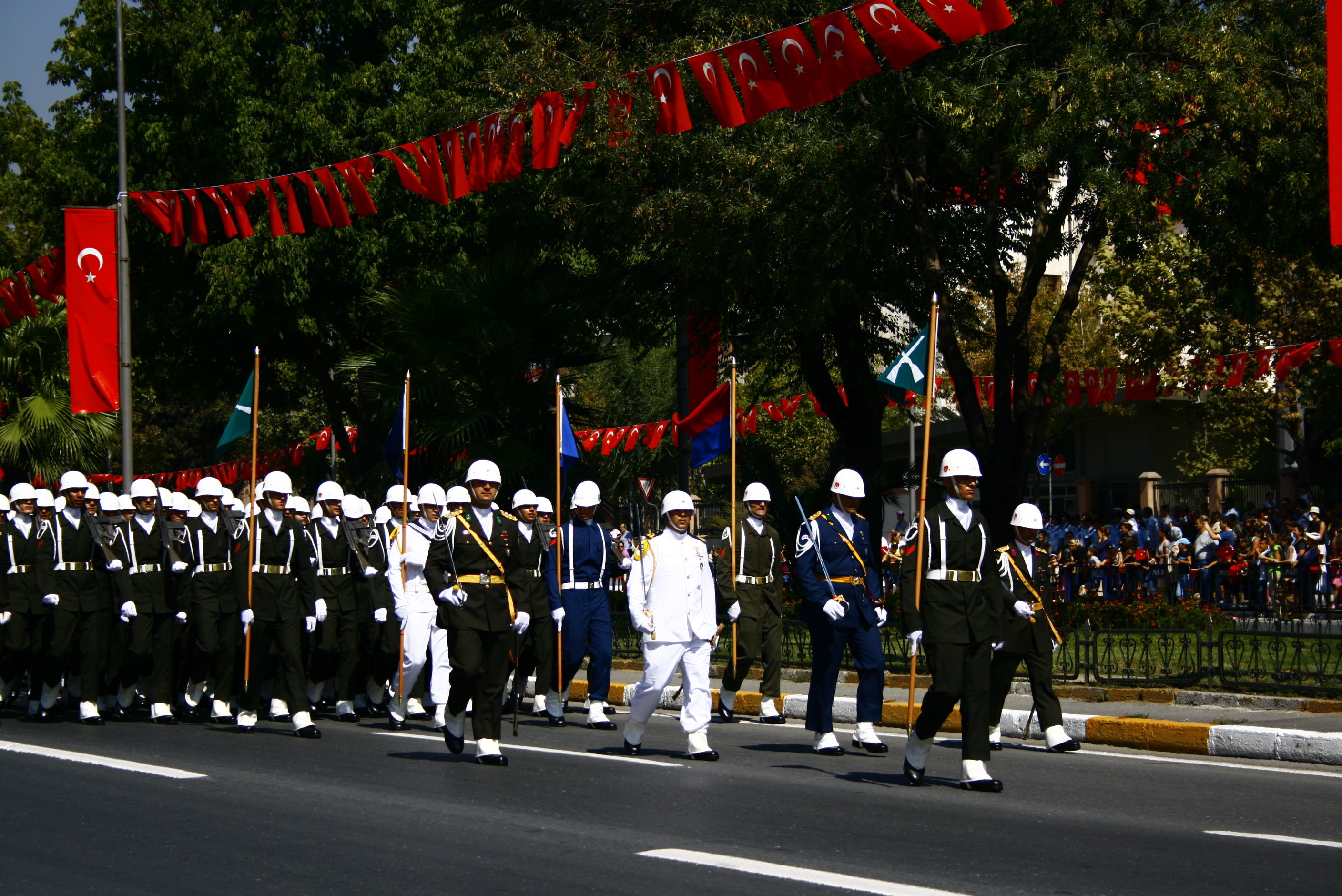
- Soldiers of the Turkish Armed Forces during the Victory Day parade, 30 August 2007.
- Official name: Zafer Bayramı (Turkish)
- Also called: Turkish Armed Forces Day; The Thirtieth of August
- Observed by: Turkey; Northern Cyprus
- Type: National
- Significance: The day in 1922 that the Battle of Dumlupınar was won by the Turkish army
- Celebrations: Military parades, aerobatics demonstrations, concerts, events at military schools
- Date: 30 August
- Next time: 30 August 2027
- Frequency: annual

Victory Day (Turkish: Zafer Bayramı), also known as Turkish Armed Forces Day (Turkish: Türk Silahlı Kuvvetleri Günü), is a public holiday in Turkey commemorating the decisive victory in the Battle of Dumlupınar, on 30 August 1922. It is also observed by (de facto)Northern Cyprus.

== Background ==
The holiday commemorates the decisive victory in the Battle of Dumlupınar, the last battle in the Greco-Turkish War, on 30 August 1922. Following the battle, Greek military presence in Anatolia ended. Victory Day has been celebrated as an official holiday since 1926, and was first celebrated on 30 August 1923.

== Customs ==
Victory Day is celebrated across Turkey and in Northern Cyprus and is a celebration of the Turkish Armed Forces. The main celebration is held at Anıtkabir in Ankara, where the President of Turkey leads officials in laying wreaths and then delivers the keynote address.

One of the big commemorative events is also held at the War Academy in Istanbul, with all military promotions made on this day, while parades are held in major cities across the country with Ankara also hosting a national parade in honor of the holiday, currently small scaled, previously the national parade, in the presence of the President, was one of the biggest in Eurasia. August 30 is also the traditional the day of graduation ceremonies of military schools in Turkey – however the actual date in recent years has been before the 30th. The Turkish Stars performs an airshow over Dumlupınar. In the evening, holiday concerts are held in major cities to honor the men and women of the Armed Forces. President of Turkey, acting as the Commander-in-chief, hosts an event at the Presidential Complex.

== Celebration gallery ==
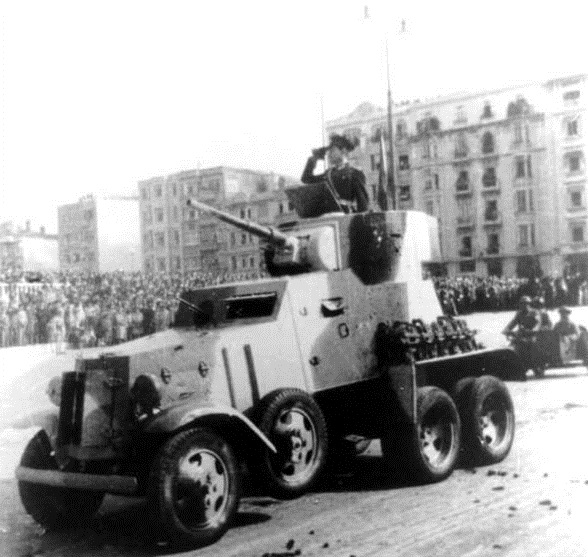
A Turkish soldier on a BA-3/6 during a military parade in Ankara (1935)

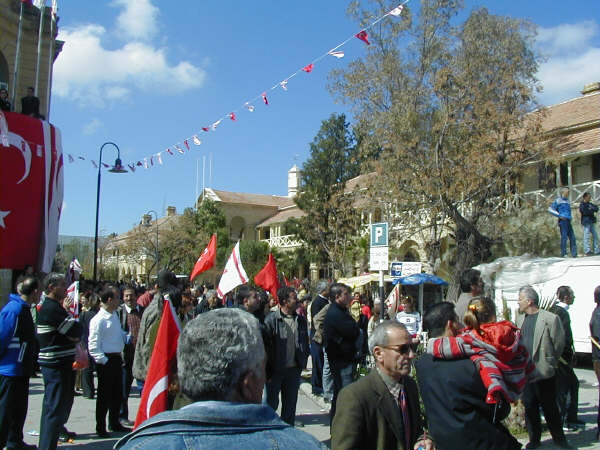
Victory Day celebrations in North Nicosia, Northern Cyprus (2006)

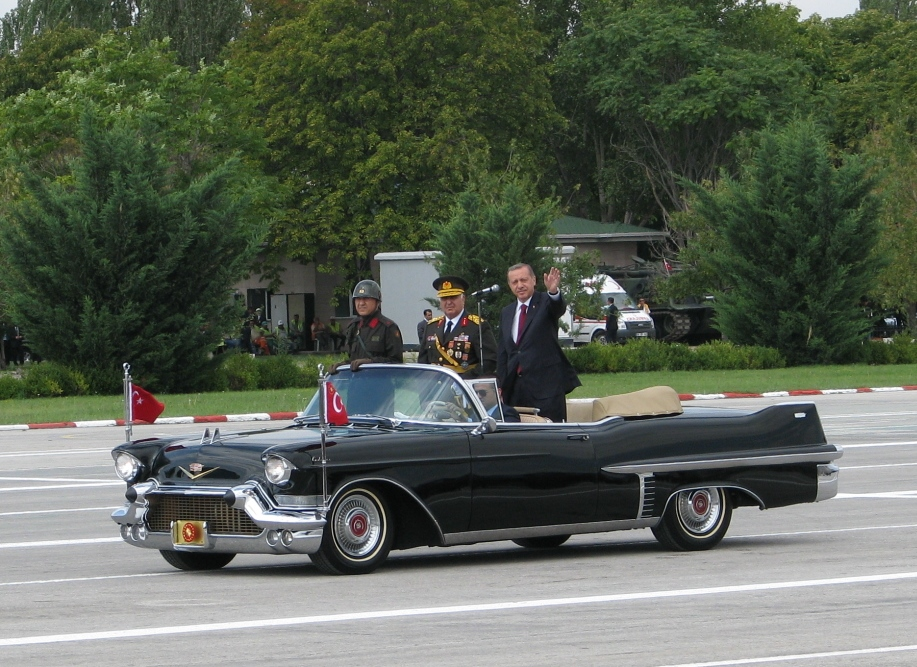
President Recep Tayyip Erdoğan greets people during a parade (2014)

== See also ==
- Victory Day
