= Freedom and Constitution Day =

Former public holiday in Turkey

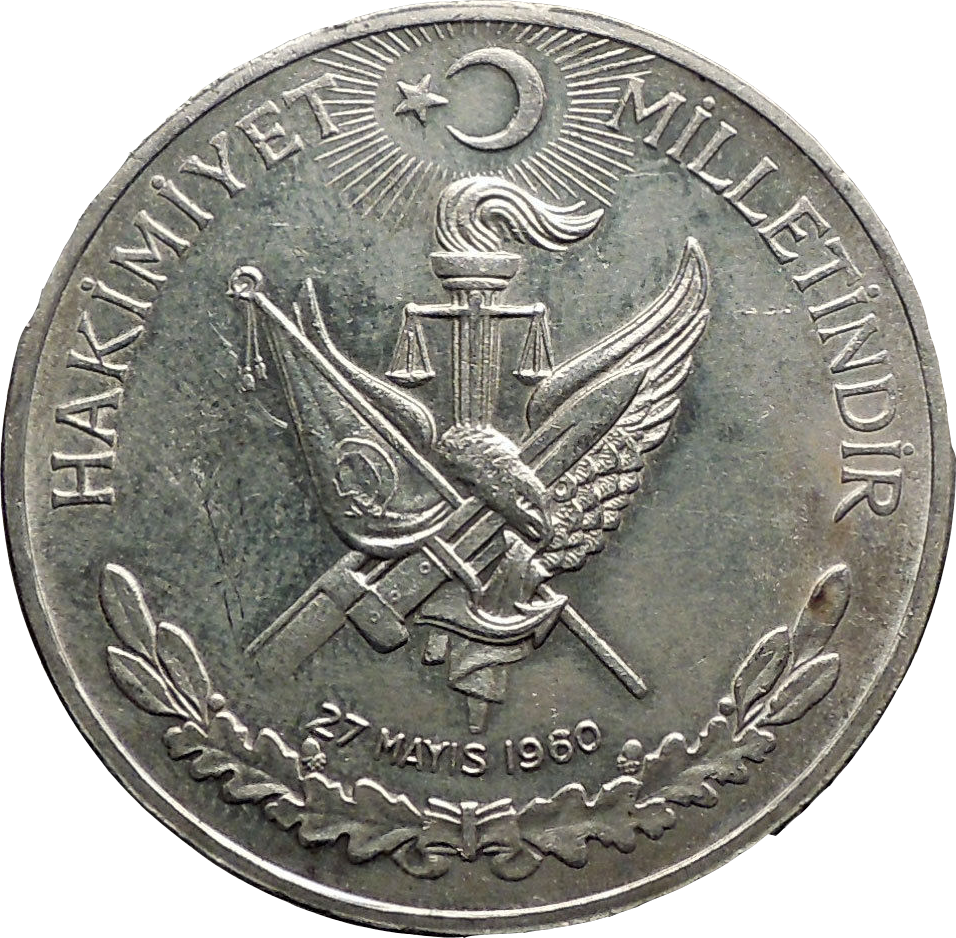

The Freedom and Constitution Day (Turkish: 27 Mayıs Hürriyet ve Anayasa Bayramı) was a public holiday in Turkey celebrated on 27 May between 1963 and 1981 in commemoration of the 27 May 1960 military coup and the new constitution.

By the 1960 military coup on 27 May, the 11th Parliament was abolished. On 9 July 1961, a referendum was held for a new constitution, and on 15 October 1961 Turkey returned to democratic political system. On 4 April 1963, a public holiday was enacted to commemorate the new constitution. The holiday was on the 27 May. The public holiday was abolished on 17 March 1981 following the 12 September 1980 military coup.

== History ==
The rationale for the new holiday was to celebrate the military and youth of Turkey that helped the coup succeed. The Turkish government strongly promoted it, however it was strongly opposed by conservative elements of Turkish society. The main celebration would involve the President of Turkey laying a wreath at the tomb of Mustafa Kamal Attaturk, the founder of modern Turkey, and the "Martyrs of Freedom" with various youth groups parading. The initial celebration in 1963 was shortened from planned due to the country being under martial law at the time.

The day was intended to promote Turkish unity. By 1979, Süleyman Demirel led calls for the holiday to be abolished on the grounds that it was not popular or accepted by many Turks. No official explanation was given by the military government for the abolition of the holiday. Conservative Turkish political parties supported the abolition whereas liberal Turkish parties opposed it as well as the concurrent abolition of Spring day.
