= Latife Uşşaki =

Mustafa Kemal Atatürk's wife (1923–1925)

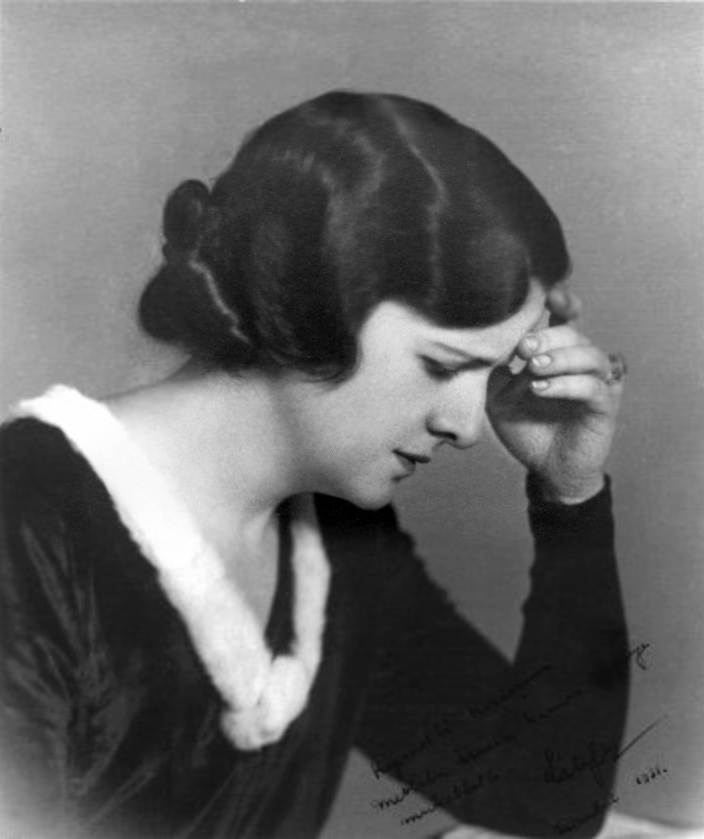
- A photograph of Latife Hanım writing to Mevhibe Hanım: "With affection to my dear sister Mevhibe İsmet".

First Lady of Turkey
- In role 29 October 1923 – 5 August 1925
- President: Mustafa Kemal Atatürk
- Preceded by: Position established
- Succeeded by: Mevhibe İnönü

Personal details
- Born: Fatıma-tüz Zehra Latife Uşakîzâde; 17 June 1898 Smyrna (now İzmir), Ottoman Empire
- Died: 12 July 1975 (aged 77) Istanbul, Turkey
- Resting place: Edirnekapı Martyr's Cemetery, Istanbul
- Spouse: Mustafa Kemal Atatürk (m. 1923; div. 1925)
- Relatives: Halid Ziya Uşaklıgil (cousin)
- Education: American College for Girls; Sorbonne University

Latife Uşaklıgil (born Fatıma-tüz Zehra Latife Uşakîzâde; with the honorifics, Latife Hanım; 17 June 1898 – 12 July 1975) was the First Lady of Turkey between 1923 and 1925 as the wife of Mustafa Kemal (later Atatürk). She was related from her father's side to Turkish novelist Halid Ziya Uşaklıgil.

== Biography ==
Lâtife Hanım was born in 1898 in Smyrna (now known in English as İzmir) to one of the most prominent Turkish trading families of the city, with roots in the city of Uşak, whence their unofficial family name of Uşakizâde. Her father, Muammer Bey, was the first Turkish member of the cotton exchanges in New York and New Orleans. She completed her high school studies at the American College for Girls in Istanbul and in 1919 she went abroad to study Law in Sorbonne and continued her studies in London. When she came back to Turkey, the Turkish War of Independence was nearing its end.

On 11 September 1922, upon returning to her family mansion in Smyrna, she was confronted by soldiers who notified her that the Pasha (Mustafa Kemal Atatürk) had taken the house as General Headquarters in Smyrna. After convincing the soldiers that she actually belonged to the household, she was allowed in.

Lâtife Hanım and Mustafa Kemal Pasha married on 29 January 1923 when he had returned to Smyrna just after his mother Zübeyde Hanım's death. For two and a half years, Lâtife Hanım symbolized the new face of Turkish women as a first lady who was very present in public life which, in Turkey, was a novelty by the standards of her day. She had a significant influence on the reforms which began in Turkey in the 1920s for the emancipation of women. It was the policy of Atatürk to make women an active part of society and abolish gender segregation, and his wife acted as an important visual role model by attending official functions unveiled in a gender mixed company.

However, the relationship between her and her husband was not happy; after frequent arguments, the two were divorced on 5 August 1925. Lâtife Hanım lived the rest of her days in İzmir (as Smyrna came to be known in English after the 1930s) and Istanbul (known as Constantinople in English prior to the 1930s), in virtual seclusion, avoiding contacts outside her private circle until her death in 1975. She never remarried, and remained silent about their relationship throughout her life. In 2005, the Turkish Historical Society was to make her diaries public "except for the most private ones, taking the views of her family into consideration". However, her family publicly claimed that they had the right to the ownership of the letters and stated that they did not wish the diaries to be published. Consequently, the society decided against the publication.

A comprehensive biography of Latife Hanım by the veteran Cumhuriyet journalist İpek Çalışlar was published in 2006.

== Gallery ==
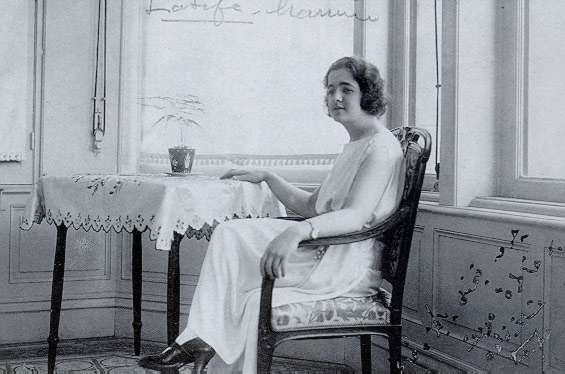
Latife Uşakizâde in 1923.

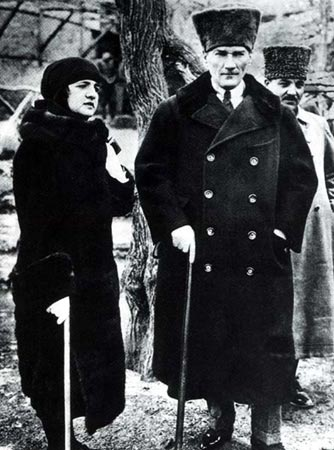
Mustafa Kemal Atatürk and Latife Uşakizâde, during a trip in 1923.

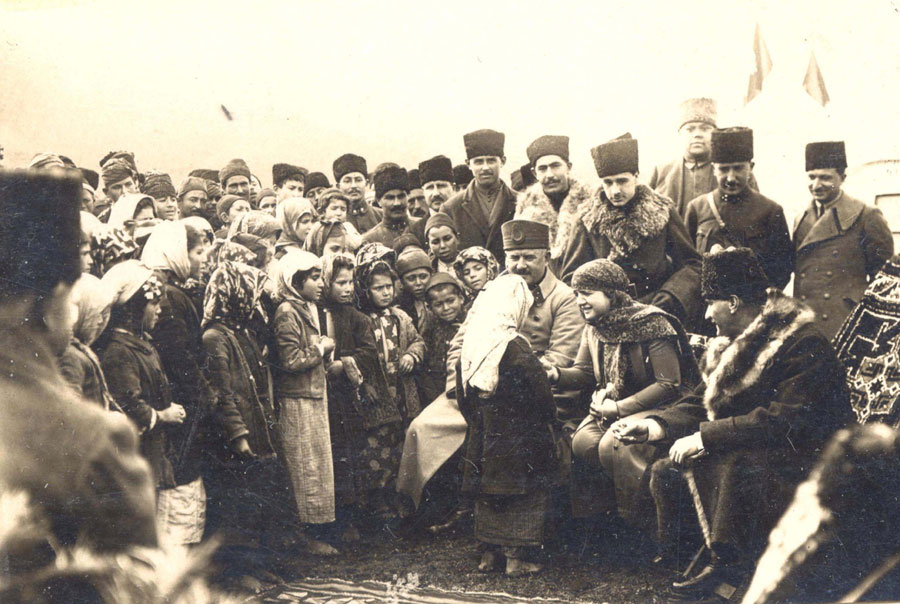
Kâzım Karabekir, Latife, and Mustafa Kemal in Ergama village on the way to Edremit on 8 February 1923.

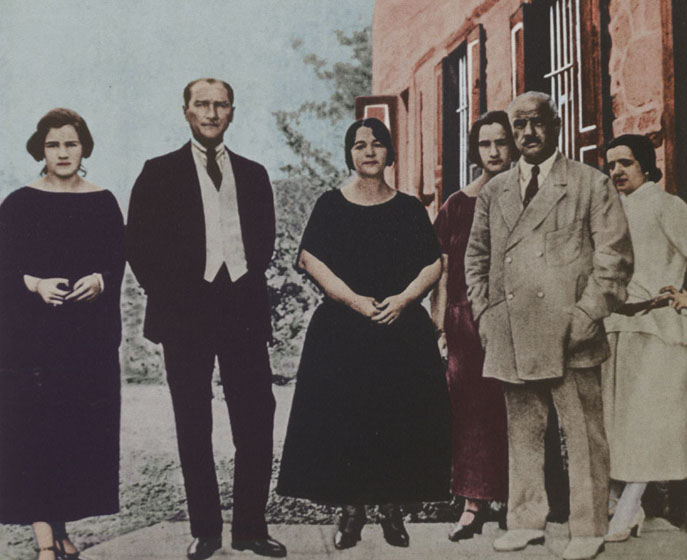
Mustafa Kemal Pasha and Latife Hanım (far left) with her family in early 1923.

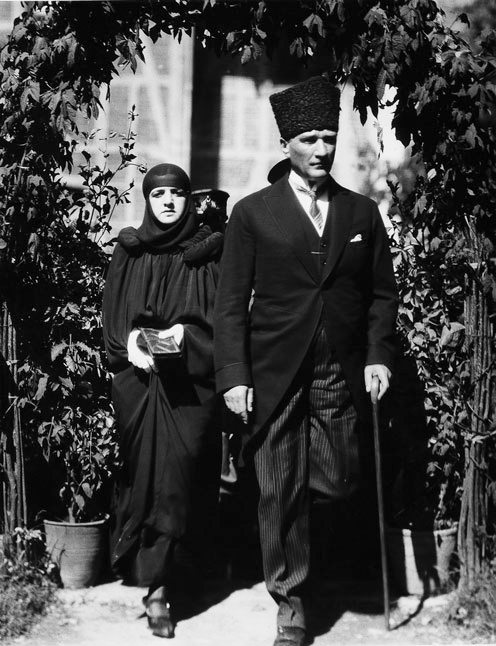
Kemal Atatürk and Latife Uşakizade during a trip to Bursa in 1924

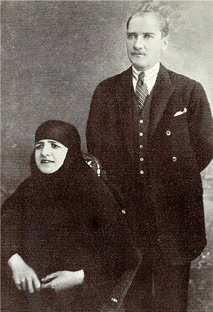
Mustafa Kemal and Latife.

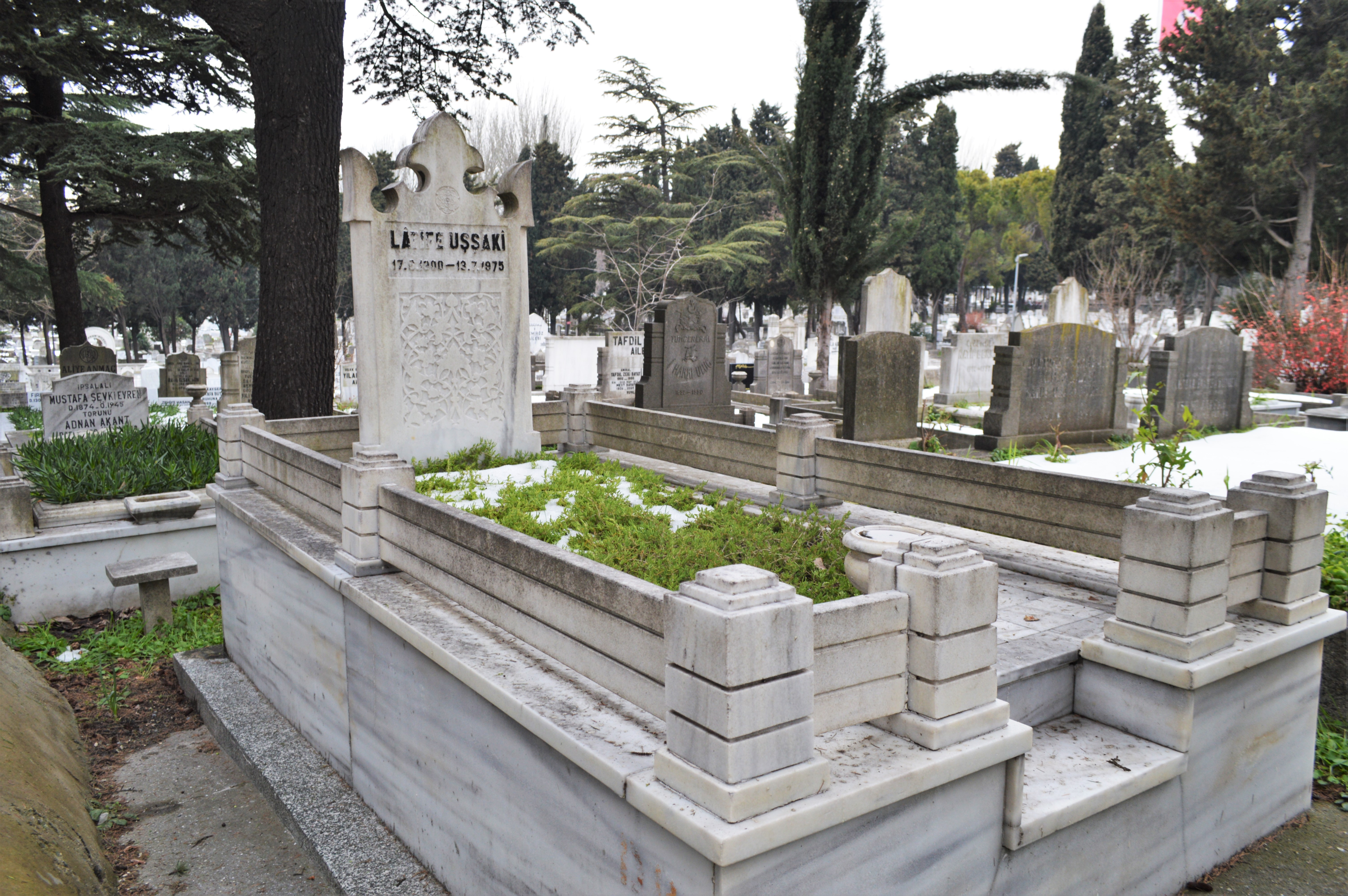
Grave of Latife Hanım in Edirnekapı Martyr's Cemetery, Istanbul
