= Atıfet Sunay =

First lady of Turkey from 1966 to 1973

First Lady of Turkey
- In role 28 March 1966 – 28 March 1973
- President: Cevdet Sunay
- Preceded by: Melahat Gürsel
- Succeeded by: Emel Korutürk

Personal details
- Born: 1904 Üsküdar, Istanbul, Ottoman Empire
- Died: 21 October 2002 (aged 97–98) Istanbul, Turkey
- Resting place: Zincirlikuyu Cemetery, Istanbul
- Spouse: Cevdet Sunay (m. 1929; died 1982)
- Children: 3

Atıfet Sunay (1904 – 21 October 2002) was the First Lady of Turkey from 28 March 1966 until 28 March 1973 during the presidency of her husband Cevdet Sunay.

Atıfet was born in Üsküdar, Istanbul, then Ottoman Empire in 1903. The family moved to Adapazarı when her father retired. She completed the middle school. Through her older brother, she was introduced to her future husband Cevdet Bey, the son of a regiment mufti. Her engagement resulted in breach of promise because her father did not want her daughter marry a military officer, who would take her to far places due to his duty. Only two years later, in 1929, he accepted the situation, and the couple married. They had three sons, Atilla, Aysel and Argun Sunay.

Her husband, a retired four-star general and former Chief of the General Staff, was elected president right after Cemal Gürsel's presidency was ended on 28 March 1966 by the Grand National Assembly of Turkey due to his illness. Atıfet Sunay resided as First Lady at Çankaya Mansion for seven years until his husband resigned from presidency due to ill health.

She told in a book that "she saved the lives of four Military Academy cadets from execution, who tried to raid the presidential residence during the 1971 military coup. She denied to know them at all". She added that "she did so because she is a mother of three, and the young military students looked at herin the court as she was their mother".

On 21 October 2002, Sunay died at the age of 98 in the intensive care unit of a hospital in Istanbul, where she was delivered one week before. She was interred at the Zincirlikuyu Cemetery following the religious funeral service held at the Şişli Mosque.
