= Turan Emeksiz =

Turkish university student (1940–1960)

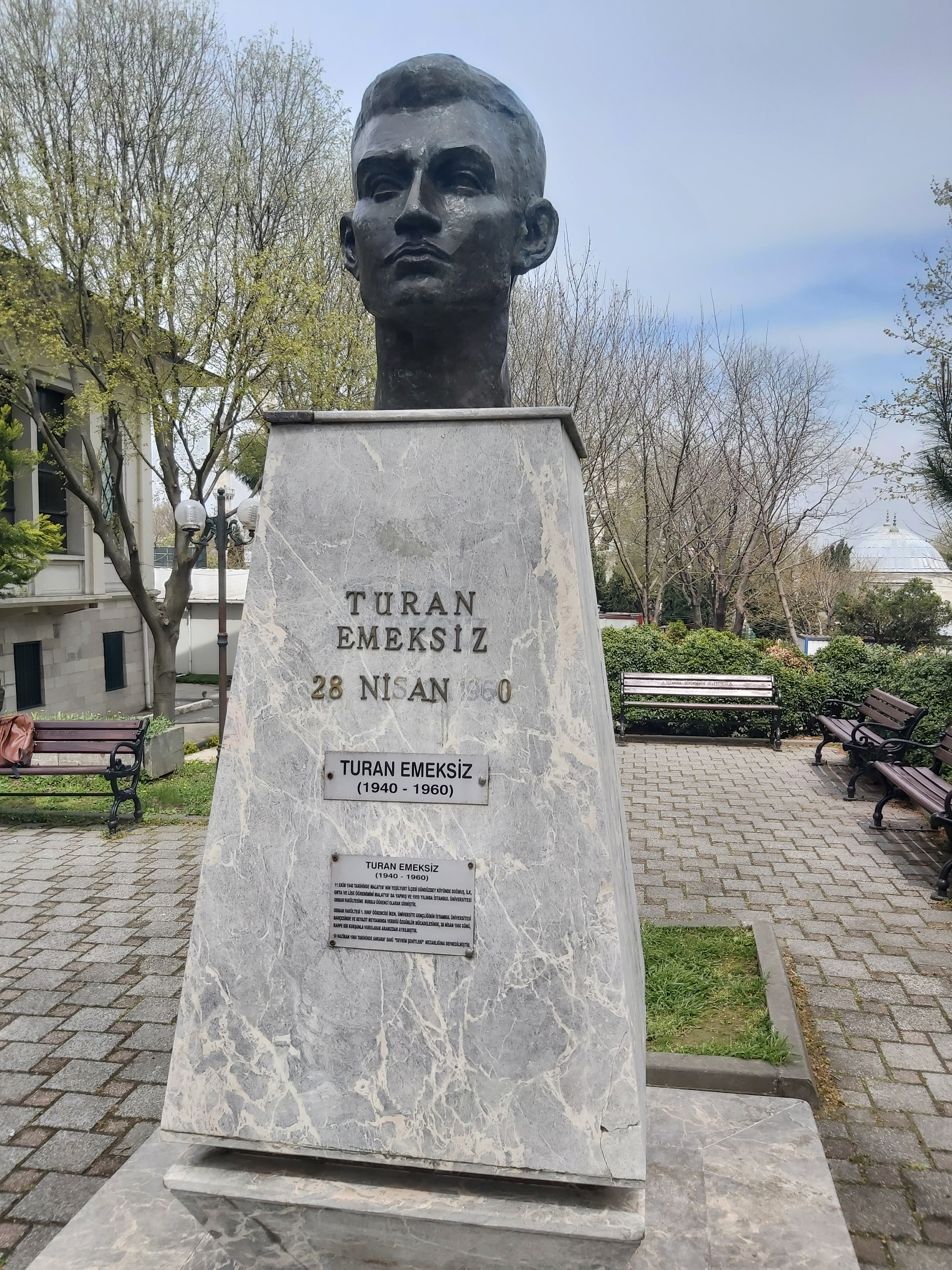
- Born: 11 November 1940; Yeşilyurt, Turkey
- Died: 28 April 1960 (aged 19); Istanbul, Turkey
- Other name: Ahmet
- Occupation: Forestry student
- Known for: 28 April 1960 demonstrations

Ahmet Turan Emeksiz (11 November 1940 – 28 April 1960) was a Turkish university student who was killed in 1960 street demonstrations.

== Life ==
Emeksiz was born in Gündüzbey village of Yeşilyurt district, Malatya Province in 1940. After high school in Malatya, he studied in the Forestry school of Istanbul University. On 28 April 1960 he took part in a student demonstration against the Committee of Inquest, a new super-power committee established by the Democrat Party (DP) government. During the demonstrations he was killed by a police bullet. The police department claimed that the bullet which killed Emeksiz was a bounced bullet. But the issue was not resolved for more than 50 years. Finally in 2013 it was officially reported that the bullet was intentionally aimed at Emeksiz.

== Legacy ==
Although he was not a political figure, he became a symbol of DP government's last days. One commuter boat serving in Bosphorous was named after Turan Emeksiz. This boat is now used as a restaurant in Mudanya. In Malatya, a highschool was named Turan Emeksiz Lisesi; but in 1980s the school was renamed as Malatya Lisesi The newer section of Karabucak Forest in Tarsus is also named after him. He has two busts one in Istanbul and one in Malatya.
