= Fahrettin Özdilek =

Turkish politician

Prime Minister of Turkey Interim
- In office 30 October 1961 – 20 November 1961
- President: Cemal Gürsel
- Preceded by: Cemal Gürsel
- Succeeded by: İsmet İnönü

Personal details
- Born: 1898 Bursa, Ottoman Empire
- Died: 13 March 1989 (aged 90–91) Ankara, Turkey

Military service
- Allegiance: Turkey
- Branch/service: Turkish Army
- Rank: General
- Battles/wars: Turkish War of Independence: Greco-Turkish War (1919-1922)

Emin Fahrettin Özdilek was a military officer and politician. He served as acting prime minister of Turkey in 1961.

== Military career ==
Özdilek entered cadet school in 1916. He was promoted to Lieutenant the following year. Özdilek would later participate in the Turkish War of Independence, including in the Greco-Turkish War (1919–1922). He was promoted to General in 1959.

He was Commander of the First Army of Turkey (August 1958 to June 1960).

== Political career ==
Özdilek became defense minister, state minister and deputy prime minister in 1960 after the Turkish military organized the May 1960 Turkish coup d'état and overthrew the government of Adnan Menderes. The following year, he became acting prime minister during military control of Turkey after the previous prime minister, Cemal Gürsel, became president. He held the position until the government was once again under civilian control with İsmet İnönü as prime minister. Later, he served in the Senate of the Republic and the Grand National Assembly of Turkey. In the first session of the 1983 parliament, he assumed the temporary leadership of the new parliament during the ceremonies and the election of the new parliament chairman.
