= Fethi Gürcan =

Turkish equestrian

Personal information
- Nationality: Turkish
- Born: 1922 Ereğli, Konya, Ottoman Empire
- Died: 27 June 1964 (aged 41–42) Ulucanlar, Altındağ, Ankara, Turkey
- Resting place: Cebeci Asri Cemetery
- Years active: 1943–1962

Sport
- Sport: Equestrian

Fethi Gürcan (1922 – 27 June 1964) was a Turkish major and equestrian. He competed in two events at the 1956 Summer Olympics.

== Career ==
Gürcan graduated from the Turkish Military Academy in 1943 with the rank of cavalry lieutenant. Having succeeded in various equestrian competitions, he was chosen to represent Turkey at the 1956 Summer Olympics.

Gürcan participated in the 1962 Turkish coup attempt under the leadership of Talât Aydemir. For his role in the failed coup he was discharged from the army and sentenced to death. He was executed by the Turkish government on 27 June 1964.
