= Sıddık Sami Onar =

Turkish academic (1898–1972)

- Born: November 11, 1897; Istanbul, Ottoman Empire
- Died: August 9, 1972 (aged 74); Istanbul
- Resting place: Istanbul
- Education: Istanbul University
- Known for: First elected rector
- Scientific career
- Fields: Administrative law
- Workplaces: Istanbul, Ankara

Sıddık Sami Onar (November 11, 1897 – August 9, 1972) was a Turkish academic specialized in administrative law at the Istanbul University.

== Life ==
He was born in Istanbul to Melekper and Abdullah Sami. After graduating from Vefa High School, he studied in the faculty of law in Istanbul University (then known as Darülfünun) . In 1925 he was appointed as a civil court judge in Istanbul. He also served as a part-time instructor in various schools. In 1933, he was appointed as the professor of administrative law. Next year he became the distinguished professor and the dean of the faculty. In 1946 the elected rectors system in Turkish Universities was adopted and Onar was elected as the first elected rector of the Istanbul University. With some pauses he kept this post till 1963.

== In April 28 demonstrations ==
In 1960, shortly before the 1960 Turkish coup d'etat Sıddık Sami Onar was the rector of Istanbul University. On April 28 the students protested Committee of Inquest, a new super-power committee established by the Democrat Party (DP) government. The police entered the university campus to arrest the students and Onar objected police operation, noting the autonomous status of the university. Although he spoke to Namık Gedik, the minister of Interior the police continued the operations and during the demonstrations he was wounded on the head. He was also dragged along by the police.

== After the coup ==
Following the 1960 coup Professor Onar was appointed as the head of the Science Commmitte by the military rule to prepare the new constitution. However, later the committee was abolished . On October 28, 1960, when the military rule forced 147 academics to retire, Onar resigned from his post in the university to protest the operation. But soon the military rule convinced him to return to his former position.
