= Committee of Inquest =

Political committee in Turkey

Committee of Inquest (Turkish: Tahkikat komisyonu) was a political committee in Turkey which is usually considered one of the major causes that led to the 1960 Turkish coup d'état.

== Background ==
Democrat Party (DP) defeated the Republican People's Party (CHP) in the 1950 general elections and ruled Turkey between 1950-1960. However towards 1960, Turkey faced with economic problems like the 1958 devaluation in which Turkish lira was devaluated more than 3 times (the value of $1 jumped from 2.80 TL to 9 TL) Rise in commodity prices and scarcity of imported technology items caused unrest and consequently CHP support increased. DP government tried to suppress CHP-revival by bans on CHP activities. In Uşak and in Istanbul (Topkapı) İsmet İnönü, the leader of CHP was attacked by DP sympathizers on 1 and 4 May 1959. This meant that DP, the once champion of democracy adopted a form of authoritarian rule. In this struggle most of the press, which had previously supported DP, sided with CHP.

== The committee ==
On 25 March 1960, İsmet İnönü, the leader of CHP tried to visit Kayseri as a part of his election campaign. But his train was stopped in Yeşilhisar town. This caused nationwide protests. DP deputies however published a notice claiming that CHP was preparing a rebellion. On 27 April DP parliamentary group which held the majority in the parliament passed a law to form a committee of Inquest. The committee, all members of which were DP MPs was tasked with inquires about the opposition party (CHP) and the press. The political committee was authorized like a court, including imprisonment. The chairman of the committee was Ahmet Hamdi Sancar and the committee was nicknamed as "Sancar’s committee". The first decision of the committee was to ban the political activities and to precensor the press. But İnönü continued to oppose the committee. He noted that the principle of separation of powers was violated.

== 28 April demonstrations ==
The law caused further unrest and on the next day a big protest was organized by the university students in Istanbul. The protest was duly banned; but nevertheless was carried on. Among other things, the rector of the Istanbul University (Sıddık Sami Onar) was beaten by the police and one university student (Turan Emeksiz) was shot and killed by the police.

== End of the committee ==
According to the law, the committee would serve for three months. But it was abolished by the 1960 coup on 27 May.
