= National Unity Committee =

Military government of Turkey from 1960 to 1961

Agency overview
- Formed: May 27, 1960
- Dissolved: October 26, 1961
- Superseding agency: Senate of The Republic
- Type: Legislative body and executive body Upper house of Constituent Assembly
- Agency executive: Cemal Gürsel, Chairman

The National Unity Committee (Turkish: Milli Birlik Komitesi; MBK) was a military junta formed following the 1960 Turkish coup d'état. It dissolved with the 1961 general election.

== Background ==
Between 1950 and 1960, the ruling party in Turkey was Democrat Party (DP). Towards 1960, Turkey faced political corruption and economic crises, in which the Turkish currency was devalued from ₺2.80 to ₺9.00 for US$1.00. Rise in commodity prices and scarcity of imported industrial goods caused unrest, and consequently political support for the DP decreased while it increased for the opposition, especially the Republican People's Party (CHP). The DP government tried to suppress a revival of the CHP by banning its public activities. In 1959, İsmet İnönü, the leader of the CHP, was assaulted at rallies by DP sympathizers in Uşak on May 1 and in Istanbul on May 4. The press was set under heavy censorship. Many journalists, including popular columnist Metin Toker, as well as profiled opposition politicians, such as Osman Bölükbaşı, the leader of the Republican Villagers Nation Party (CKMP), were arrested. On April 27, 1960, the parliamentary group of the DP, which held the majority in the parliament, passed a law to form a Committee of Inquest, which was authorized with the powers of a court. The committee, composed of DP deputies only, was tasked with inquires about the members of the opposition parties and the press.

== The committee ==
On May 27, 1960, a group of military officers staged a coup d'état. The revolting officers did not act in the traditional military hierarchy. The chief of general staff, commanders of the air and naval forces were not among the group, and the commander of the land forces General Cemal Gürsel joined the group only after the operation began. The number of generals in the group with 38 members was only five while the remaining officers were of lower ranks, such as colonel, major or even captain.

Below is the list of the committee members:

Name	Rank	Force
Cemal Gürsel	Army general	Land
Fahri Özdilek	Army general	Land
Cemal Madanoğlu	Lieutenant general	Land
Sıtkı Ulay	Brigadier general	Land
İrfan Baştuğ	Brigadier general	Land
Ekrem Acuner	Colonel	Land
Osman Köksal	Colonel	Land
Fikret Kuytak	Colonel	Land
Sami Küçük	Colonel	Land
Muzaffer Yurdakuler	Colonel	Land
Haydar Tunçkanat	Colonel	Air
Refet Aksoyoğlu	Lieutenant colonel	Land
Kadri Kaplan	Lieutenant colonel	Land
Suphi Karaman	Lieutenant colonel	Land
Sezai Okan	Lieutenant colonel	Land
Mucip Ataklı	Lieutenant colonel	Air
Mehmet Özgüneş	Major	Land
Vehbi Ersü	Major	Land
Suphi Gürsoytrak	Major	Land
Şükran Özkaya	Major	Land
Ahmet Yıldız	Major	Land
Selahattin Özgür	Lieutenant commander	Naval
Kamil Karavelioğlu	Captain	Land
Emanullah Çelebi	Captain	Air
Alparslan Türkeş	Colonel	Land
Orhan Kabibay	Lieutenant colonel	Land
Mustafa Kaplan	Lieutenant colonel	Land
Orhan Erkanlı	Major	Land
Muzaffer Karan	Major	Land
Şefik Soyuyüce	Major	Land
Fazıl Akkoyunlu	Major	Land
Dündar Taşer	Major	Land
Münir Köseoğlu	Lieutenant commander	Naval
Numan Esin	Captain	Land
İrfan Solmazer	Captain	Land
Muzaffer Özdağ	Captain	Land
Rıfat Baykal	Naval lieutenant	Naval
Ahmet Er	Captain	Gendarmerie

The chairman of the committee was Cemal Gürsel. He became also the prime minister in the 24th and 25th government of Turkey during the military regime.

Among other generals, Irfan Baştuğ died in a traffic accident on September 12, 1960 and Cemal Madanoğlu resigned from the committee on July 7, 1961, both during the military regime.

== The Fourteen ==
While Cemal Gürsel was trying to re-establish the civilian regime as soon as possible, fourteen members of the committee under the leadership of Colonel Alparslan Türkeş were planning to continue the military regime with the intention of making reforms. On September 13, 1960, they were expelled from the committee (Their names are marked by yellow color in the above list.). They were sent as diplomats to Turkish embassies abroad. Although they were later given pardon, they could never return to the committee. In later years, Alparslan Türkeş became the leader of the Republican Villagers Nation Party and renamed it to Nationalist Movement Party.

== Aftermath ==
Following the 1961 general election on October 15, Turkey returned to civilian rule. Cemal Gürsel was elected president. The other twenty-one members of the MBK became the permanent members of the Turkish senate. In 1968 five of them were expelled from the Senate. The rest lost their memberships in another coup in 1980.

== See also ==
- 1962 attempted coup in Turkey
