= Cevdet Sunay =

President of Turkey from 1966 to 1973

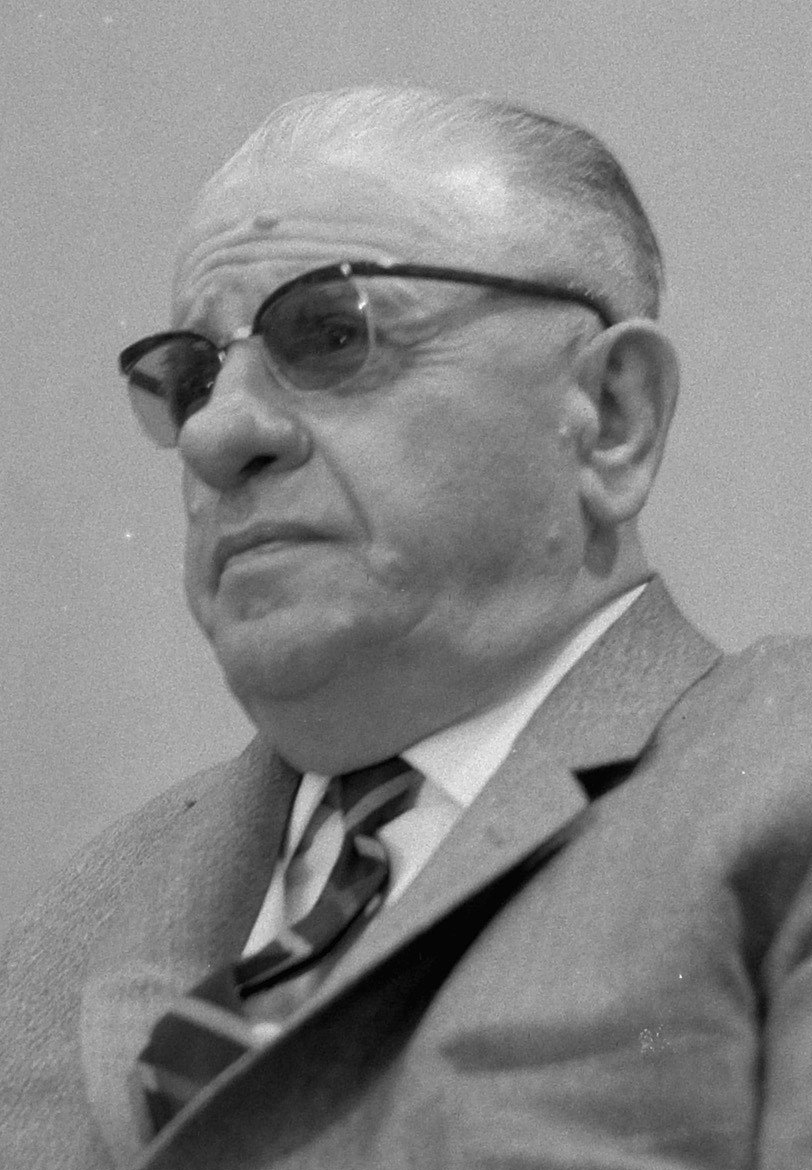
- Sunay in 1964

5th President of Turkey
- In office 28 March 1966 – 28 March 1973
- Prime Minister: Süleyman Demirel; Nihat Erim; Ferit Melen
- Preceded by: Cemal Gürsel
- Succeeded by: Fahri Korutürk; Tekin Arıburun (acting)

12th Chief of the General Staff of Turkey
- In office 4 August 1960 – 16 March 1966
- President: National Unity Committee; Cemal Gürsel
- Preceded by: Ragıp Gümüşpala
- Succeeded by: Cemal Tural

Commander of the Turkish Army
- In office 3 June 1960 – 2 August 1960
- Preceded by: Cemal Gürsel
- Succeeded by: Mehmet Muzaffer Alankuş

Personal details
- Born: 10 February 1899 Çaykara, Trabzon Vilayet, Ottoman Empire
- Died: 22 May 1982 (aged 83) Istanbul, Turkey
- Resting place: Cebeci Military Martyr's Cemetery (1982–1988); Turkish State Cemetery (since 1988)
- Party: Independent
- Spouse: Atıfet Sunay (m. 1929)
- Children: 3
- Education: Kuleli Military High School
- Alma mater: Turkish Military Academy; Army War Institute

Military service
- Allegiance: Ottoman Empire; Turkey
- Branch/service: Ottoman Army; Turkish Land Forces
- Rank: General
- Battles/wars: See list: World War I; Middle Eastern theatre; Palestine Front; Turkish War of Independence; Greco-Turkish War

Ahmet Cevdet Sunay (Note: Turkish: [ˈdʒevdet ˈsunaj]) (10 February 1899 – 22 May 1982) was a Turkish politician and military officer who served as the president of Turkey from 1966 to 1973.

== Early life and career ==
Sunay was born in 1899 in the village of Ataköy near Çaykara in Trabzon Vilayet, Ottoman Empire. After attending elementary school and middle school in Erzurum and Edirne, he graduated from Kuleli Military High School in Istanbul. During World War I, he fought in 1917 at the Palestine front and became a prisoner of war of the British in Egypt in 1918. After his release, he fought first on the southern front, then on the western front during the Turkish War of Independence.

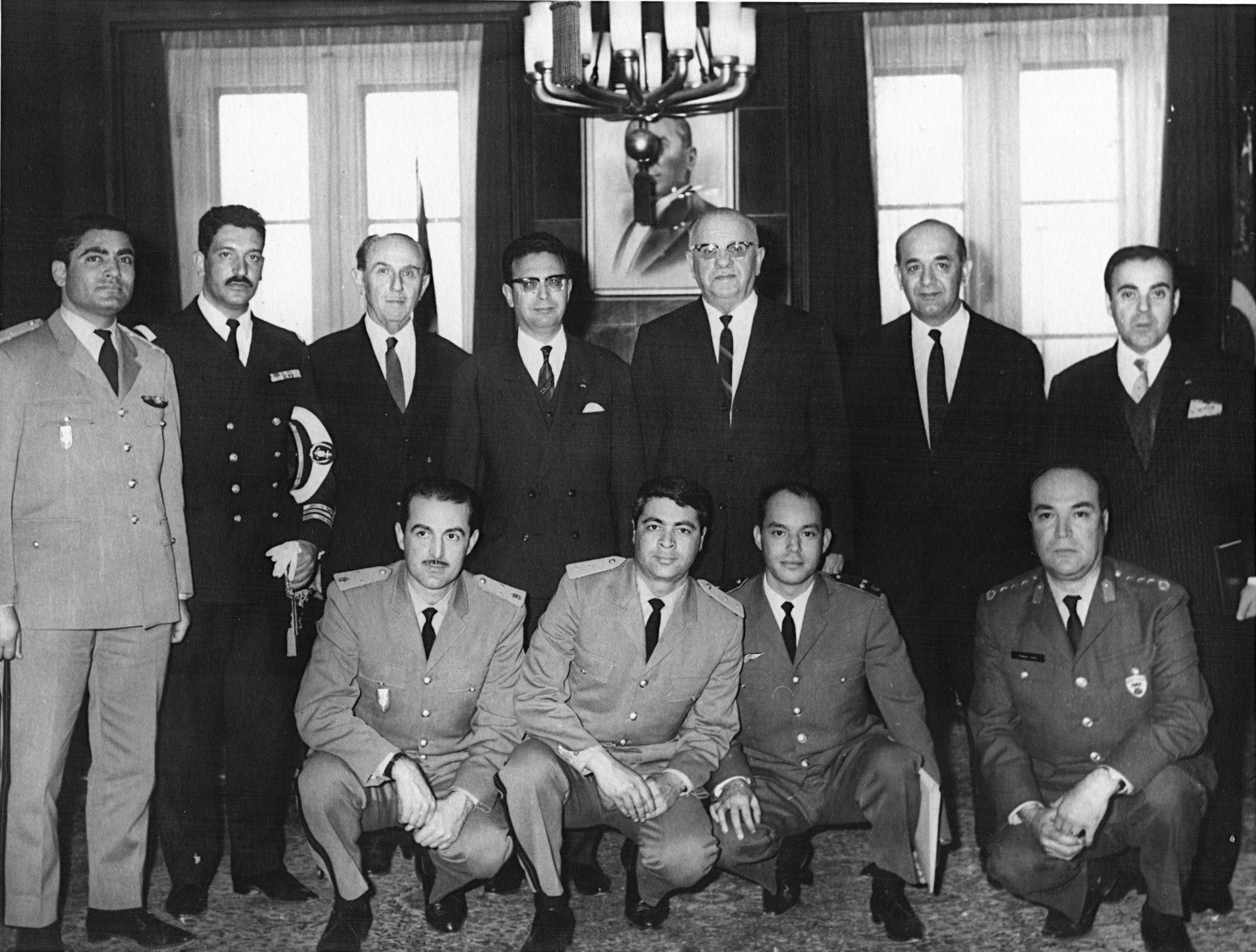
President Cevdet Sunay at Çankaya Palace on march 1967, with Tunisia's Minister of National Defense Ahmed Mestiri and a senior military delegation during an official state visit aimed at exploring bi-lateral military cooperation.

Sunay completed his military education in 1927, and graduated from the Staff College in 1930 as a staff officer. Rising through the ranks to become a general in 1949 and then a four-star general in 1959, he held important military posts. In 1960, he was appointed army chief and later the Chief of the General Staff. On 14 March 1966, he was appointed to the senate by Cemal Gürsel under his presidential contingency.

When Gürsel's presidency was terminated due to ill health in accordance with the constitution, Cevdet Sunay was elected 5th president by the Grand National Assembly of Turkey on 28 March 1966. He maintained his office despite increasing terrorist activity, student riots, and threatened coups. He served the constitutional term of seven years until 28 March 1973 and became then a permanent senator.

He was married to Atıfet in 1929. They had three sons, Atilla, Aysel and Argun Sunay.

== Presidency ==
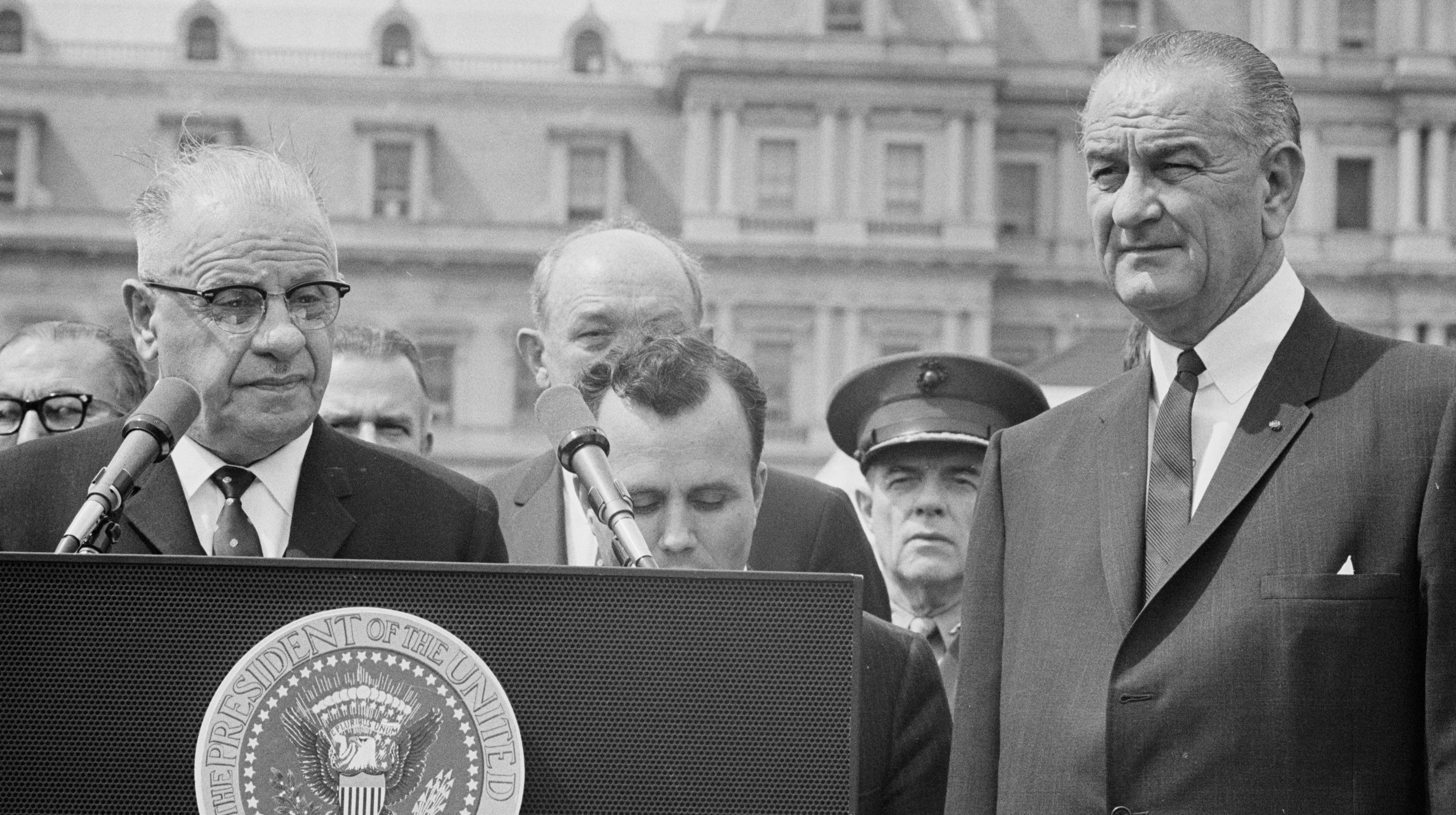
Cevdet Sunay speaking outside the White House next to Lyndon B. Johnson in 1967

Sunay was elected as the fifth president of the Turkish Republic by the Grand National Assembly of Turkey on 28 March 1966. His presidential service continued until 28 March 1973 where he had to go through troubled times. Between 1961 and 1965 Süleyman Demirel, Nihat Erim and Ferit Melen were the most prominent members in President Sunay’s administration. Cevdet Sunay resigned as president due to deteriorating health conditions.

== Death ==
Cevdet Sunay died of a heart attack on 22 May 1982 in Istanbul. His body was moved in August 1988 to a permanent burial place in the newly built Turkish State Cemetery in Ankara.

== Honours ==
National honours

- Turkey: Medal of Independence with Red Ribbon

Foreign honours

- Imperial State of Iran: Commemorative Medal of the 2,500th anniversary of the Persian Empire (1971)
- Finland: Grand Cross with Collar of the Order of the White Rose of Finland (1971)
- United Kingdom: Knight Commander of the Order of the Bath (KCB)

== Notes ==
Military offices
Preceded by Cemal Gürsel	Commander of the Turkish Army; 1960	Succeeded by Mehmet Muzaffer Alankuş
Preceded by Ragıp Gümüşpala	Chief of the General Staff of Turkey; 1960–1966	Succeeded by Cemal Tural
Political offices
Preceded by Cemal Gürsel	President of Turkey; 1966–1973	Succeeded by Fahri Korutürk
