= Cemal Gürsel =

President of Turkey from 1960 to 1966

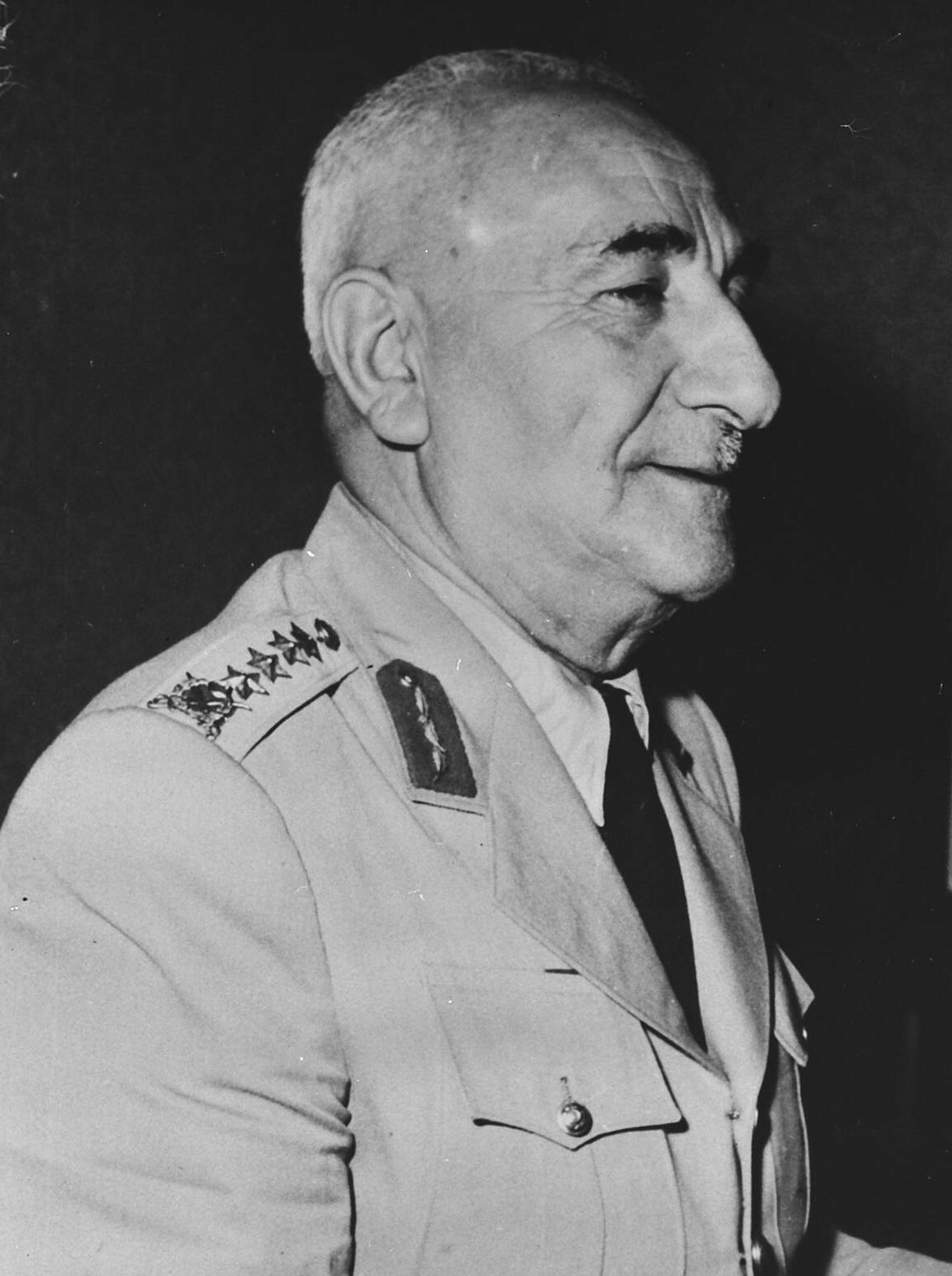
- Gürsel in 1960

4th President of Turkey
- In office 27 May 1960 – 28 March 1966 (Note: As Chairman of the National Unity Committee until 26 October 1961.) (Note: İbrahim Şevki Atasagun as acting President from 2 February 1966 while Gürsel officially remained in office.)
- Prime Minister: Himself; Fahrettin Özdilek; İsmet İnönü; Süleyman Demirel
- Preceded by: Celâl Bayar
- Succeeded by: Cevdet Sunay

10th Prime Minister of Turkey
- In office 27 May 1960 – 27 October 1961
- President: Himself
- Preceded by: Adnan Menderes
- Succeeded by: Fahrettin Özdilek

Commander of the Turkish Army
- In office 21 August 1958 – 2 June 1960
- Preceded by: Mustafa Rüştü Erdelhun
- Succeeded by: Cevdet Sunay

Personal details
- Born: 13 October 1895 Hınıs, Ottoman Empire
- Died: 14 September 1966 (aged 70) Ankara, Turkey
- Cause of death: Apoplexy
- Resting place: Anıtkabir (1966–1988); Turkish State Cemetery (since 1988)
- Party: Independent
- Spouse: Melahat Gürsel (m. 1927)
- Children: 1 (biological), 2 (adopted)
- Education: Kuleli Military High School
- Alma mater: Turkish Military Academy; Turkish Army War Institute
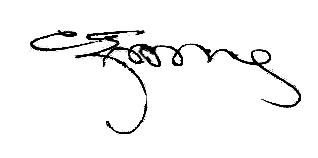
- Signature

Military service
- Allegiance: Ottoman Empire; Turkey (from 1922)
- Branch/service: Ottoman Army; Turkish Land Forces
- Rank: General
- Battles/wars: See list: World War I; Middle Eastern theatre; Gallipoli campaign; Sinai and Palestine Campaign; Turkish War of Independence; Greco-Turkish War; Second Battle of İnönü; Battle of Kütahya–Eskişehir; Battle of the Sakarya; Great Offensive

Cemal Gürsel (Note: Turkish: [dʒeˈmal ɟyɾˈsæl]) (13 October 1895 – 14 September 1966) was a Turkish military officer and politician who was the president of Turkey from 1960 to 1966 after taking power in a coup d'état.

== Early life ==
Gürsel was born in the town of Hınıs in the Erzurum vilayet as the son of an Ottoman Army officer, Abidin Bey. After elementary school in Ordu and military middle school in Erzincan, he graduated from the Kuleli military high school in Istanbul. Gürsel was in the Army for 45 years. During World War I, he participated in the Battle of Çanakkale in the Dardanelles, Gallipoli as a lieutenant with the First Battery of the 12th Artillery Regiment in 1915 and received the War Medal. He later fought at the Palestine and Syria fronts in 1917 and became a prisoner of war by the British while suffering malaria during his command of the 5th Battery of the 41st Regiment on 19 September 1918. Gürsel was kept as a prisoner of war in Egypt until 6 October 1920.

After his release, Gürsel returned to Anatolia to re-join Mustafa Kemal subsequent to Erzurum Congress and took part in all the western front campaigns in the Turkish War of Independence between 1920 and 1923. He was promoted for gallantry in the First Division excelling in the battles of Second Inönü, Eskişehir and Sakarya, and was later awarded the Medal of Independence by the first Parliament for his combat service in the Final Offensive.

Gürsel was married, in 1927, to Melahat, the daughter of the chief engineer on the Ottoman cruiser Hamidiye. From this marriage, a son Özdemir was born. The couple adopted two daughters named Hatice and Türkan.

== Military career ==
Gürsel attended the Turkish Military College and graduated in 1929 as a staff officer. He was promoted colonel in 1940. He was made a brigadier general in 1946 and made commander of the 65th Division. He was later the commander of the 12th Division, the 18th Corps commander, and commander of the 2nd Interior Tasks District. Made Lieutenant general in 1953, was general in 1957, being appointed Commander of 3rd Army. Service included chief of intelligence, and he was appointed as the Commander of Land Forces in 1958 when he was commanding an army.

== Head of state ==
A coup d'état organised and conducted by army officers at the rank of colonels and below took place without the participation or leadership of Gürsel on 27 May 1960 after continuing civilian and academia unrests throughout the country. It is rumored that four-star general Ragıp Gümüşpala, the Commander of the Third Army based in Eastern Anatolia, gave an ultimatum to the rebelling officers that if they did not have a general appointed as their head, the Third Army would attack to take over the capital and the administration of the country, thereby forcing the rebel group to find a senior officer over them. Because of his immense popularity among the public and military ranks, Gürsel was subsequently chosen by the revolutionaries overnight and brought into the chairmanship of the military coup and became, as of 2015, the only leader in the world put into power by a military takeover who had previously had no role in its planning or execution. He, while still in his pajamas, was escorted to Ankara in the military C-47 transport plane by a captain who was the youngest officer of the radical coup team who that by that time had already sent President Celâl Bayar, Prime Minister Adnan Menderes, Chief of General Staff Rüştü Erdelhun and some other members of the ruling Democratic Party to a military court on Yassıada in the Sea of Marmara, accusing them of violation of the constitution. The day after the coup Gürsel was declared the commander in chief, Head of state, Prime minister and Minister of Defense of the 24th government on 30 May 1960, in theory giving him more absolute powers than even Kemal Atatürk had ever had.

Gürsel freed 200 students and nine newsmen, and licensed 14 banned newspapers to start publishing again He appointed General Ragıp Gümüşpala, the commander of the Third Army, as the new Chief of the General Staff who, upon his retirement in two months, was succeeded by General Cevdet Sunay, and Gümüşpala was further directed by Gürsel to form the new Justice Party to bring together the former members of the Democratic Party. A simple and conservative sort, Gürsel became Turkey's most popular figure, forbade display of his picture alongside Atatürk's in government offices, rode about in an open Jeep touring rural communities, talking to the peasants almost as if they were his children (Time, 6 January 1961). He was successful with his personal interventions in reducing the number of execution verdicts from the Yassıada trials from 15 down to three. Gürsel's plea for forgiveness and attempts along with several other world leaders for the reversal of the execution sentences and for the release of Adnan Menderes and two other ministers were rejected by the Junta.

Gürsel granted a presidential pardon for the life sentences of the previous president Celal Bayar and the former chief of general staff Rüştü Erdelhun whose prior execution sentence was also revoked by the National Unity Committee upon Gürsel's appeals. He granted asylum to the political dissidents Ayatollah Khomeini of Iran.

== Illness ==
Because of a paralysis that started in early 1961 and progressed quickly in 1966, on 2 February Gürsel was flown to the Walter Reed Army Medical Center in Washington, D.C., on the private airplane "BlueBird" sent by US President Lyndon B. Johnson. One week later, he fell into a coma there after suffering a series of new paralytic strokes. The government decided his return to Turkey on 24 March. President Johnson travelled by helicopter from the White House to Andrews Air Force Base, Maryland, near Washington, D.C., to see Gürsel on his departure to home, In addition to issuing the following statement 'Our distinguished friend, President Cemal Gursel of Turkey, came to the United States on 2 February for medical treatment. There was hope that new therapeutic procedures only recently developed in this country would be useful in treating his illness of several years. We were initially encouraged by his progress at Walter Reed Hospital, only to be shocked by the news on 8 February that his health had suffered a grave new blow. Our best talent, coupled with the skill of the eminent Turkish doctors who accompanied the President, was exerted to the utmost in the hope that the President might return to his home in fully restored health. We are saddened that this hope was not to be realized. We have been deeply honored to have President Gürsel come to our country to seek medical treatment. As he returns to his homeland, our prayers go with him'. With a report of a medical committee by Gülhane Military Hospital in Ankara, the parliament ruled on 28 March 1966 that his presidency be terminated due to ill health in accordance with the constitution. He died of apoplexy at 6:45 pm on 14 September 1966 in Ankara. He left behind no directives or last will. He was laid to rest at the "Freedom Martyrs Memorial" section in the yard of the mausoleum of Atatürk. His body was transferred on 27 August 1988 to a permanent burial place in the newly built Turkish State Cemetery.

== See also ==
- 1962 attempted coup in Turkey

Military offices
Preceded by Necati Tacan	Commander of the Third Army; 1957–1958	Succeeded by Ragıp Gümüşpala
Preceded by Mustafa Rüştü Erdelhun	Commander of the Turkish Army; 1958–1960	Succeeded by Cevdet Sunay
Political offices
Preceded by Ethem Menderes	Minister of National Defense; 1960	Succeeded by Hüseyin Ataman
Preceded by Adnan Menderes	Prime Minister of Turkey; 1960–1961	Succeeded by Emin Fahrettin Özdilek
Preceded by Celal Bayar	President of Turkey; 1960–1966	Succeeded by Cevdet Sunay
