= 1960 Turkish coup d'état =

Military coup against Turkish Prime Minister Menderes

1960 Turkish coup d'etat
Date	27 May 1960
Location	Turkey
Result	Coup successful: Adnan Menderes (Prime Minister), Fatin Rüştü Zorlu (Turkish Foreign Minister), Hasan Polatkan (Minister of Finance) were executed; New constitution was declared; 27 May was declared Freedom and Constitution Day

Belligerents
National Unity Committee	23rd government of Turkey: Democrat Party

Commanders and leaders
Gen. Cemal Gürsel; Lt. Gen. Cemal Madanoğlu; Col. Alparslan Türkeş; Fahri Özdilek	Celâl Bayar; Rüştü Erdelhun; Adnan Menderes (executed); Hasan Polatkan (executed); Fatin Rüştü Zorlu (executed)

Units involved
38 Committee members	–

Casualties and losses
2 soldiers, 1 civilian	7 Democrat Party members

The 1960 Turkish coup d'état (Turkish: 27 Mayıs Darbesi), also known as the 27 May Revolution (Turkish: 27 Mayıs İhtilali or 27 Mayıs Devrimi), was the first coup d'état in the Republic of Turkey. It took place on 27 May 1960. The coup was staged by a group of 38 young Turkish military officers, acting outside the military chain of command. The officers were de facto led by Cemal Madanoğlu until the actual coup date. After a threat by Ragıp Gümüşpala that he would move to quell the coup unless it was led by someone with a higher military rank than himself, the officers brought in General Cemal Gürsel as their leader. The coup was carried out against the democratically elected government of the Democrat Party, and ultimately resulted in the execution of its prime minister, Adnan Menderes, alongside two of his ministers, Fatin Rüştü Zorlu and Hasan Polatkan.

== Background ==
The incident took place at a time of both socio-political turmoil and economic hardship, as US aid from the Truman doctrine and the Marshall Plan was running out and so Prime Minister Adnan Menderes planned to visit Moscow in the hope of establishing alternative lines of credit.

== Coup ==
Colonel Alparslan Türkeş was among the officers who led the coup. He was a member of the junta (National Unity Committee) and had been among the first 16 officers trained by the United States in 1948 to form a stay-behind counter-guerrilla. As such, he explicitly stated his anticommunism and his faith and allegiance to NATO and CENTO in his short address to nation, but he remained vague on the reasons of the coup. On the morning of 27 May, Türkeş declared the coup over radio, which ultimately announced "the end of one period in Turkish history, and usher in a new one":

The Great Turkish Nation: Starting at 3:00 am on the 27th of May, the Turkish armed forces have taken over administration throughout the entire country. This operation, thanks to the close cooperation of all our citizens and security forces, has succeeded without loss of life. Until further notice, a curfew has been imposed, exempt only to members of the armed forces. We request our citizens to facilitate the duty of our armed forces, and assist in reestablishing the nationally desired democratic regime.

— Alparslan Türkeş, Radio broadcast May, 27th 1960

In a press conference on the following day, Cemal Gürsel emphasized that the "purpose and the aim of the coup is to bring the country with all speed to a fair, clean and solid democracy.... I want to transfer power and the administration of the nation to the free choice of the people" However, a younger group within the junta around Türkeş supported a steadfast military leadership, an authoritarian rule similar as it was with the Committee of Union and Progress or during Mustafa Kemal Atatürk's regime. This group then attempted to discharge from their offices 147 University teachers. This then led to a reaction from the officers within the junta who demanded a return to democracy and a multiparty system, following which Türkeş and his group were sent abroad.

== Purge ==
The junta forced 235 generals and more than 3,000 other commissioned officers into retirement; purged more than 500 judges and public prosecutors and 1400 university faculty members and put the chief of the General Staff, the president, the prime minister and other members of the administration under arrest. Several hundred Kurdish Alevi notables were detained in a Camp in Sivas. 55, of which most were affiliated with the DP and several were Kurdish Members of the Grand National Assembly of Turkey were deported to western provinces. It followed by the appointment of the commander of the army General Cemal Gürsel, as the provisional head of state, prime minister and the minister of defense.

== Yassıada trials ==
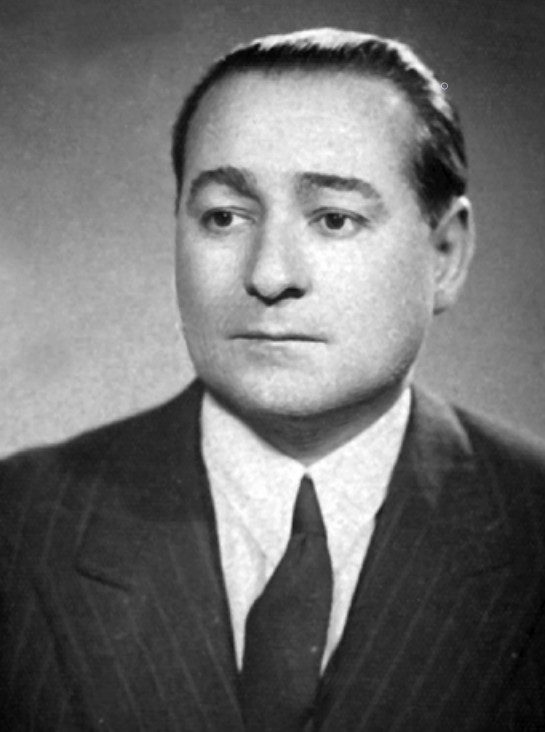
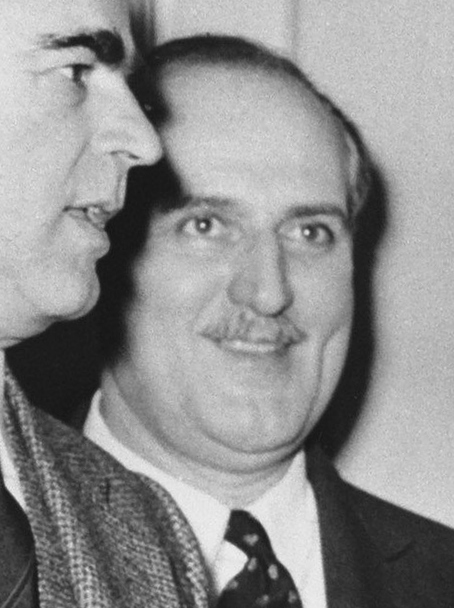
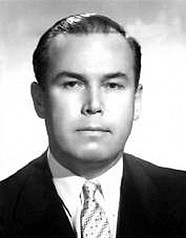
Members of the Turkish government who were hanged after the Yassıada trials

The Minister of the Interior, Namık Gedik, committed suicide while he was detained in the Turkish Military Academy. President Celal Bayar, prime minister Adnan Menderes and several other members of the administration were put on trial before a court appointed by the junta on the island Yassıada in the Sea of Marmara. The politicians were charged with high treason, misuse of public funds and abrogation of the constitution.

The tribunals ended with the execution of Minister of Foreign Affairs Fatin Rüştü Zorlu and Minister of Finance Hasan Polatkan on İmralı island on 16 September 1961, and Adnan Menderes on 17 September 1961. Celal Bayar was not hanged, but imprisoned in İmralı prison.

== Aftermath ==
A constitutional referendum was held on 9 July 1961. A new constitution was drawn up to replace the one from 1924. It was approved by 61.7% of voters, with an 81.0% turnout.

A month after the execution of Menderes and other members of the Turkish government, general elections were held on 15 October 1961. The administrative authority was returned to civilians, but the military continued to dominate the political scene until October 1965. İsmet İnönü held the office of Prime Minister for the third time from 1961 to 1965. Turkish Army Colonel Talat Aydemir organised two failed coups d'état in February 1962 and May 1963. In the first free elections after the coup, in 1965, Süleyman Demirel was elected and held the office until 1971, when he was removed by a military memorandum.

The government that was formed after the coup, although it did not last long in power, created a political atmosphere that led to one of the more distinct mass emergences of the left in Turkey's history. It is considered a revolution by the People's Liberation Party (HKP) as well as the Patriotic Party (VP).

== See also ==
- Freedom and Constitution Day
- Turkish Constitution of 1961
- Committee of Inquest
- Turkish coup d'état
