= List of Azerbaijanis in Turkey =

This is a list of notable Azerbaijani Turkish people which refers to people of full or partial Azerbaijani descent living in the Republic of Turkey.

== List ==
Number	Name	Image	Background
1	Ataol Behramoğlu		poet, translator and author
2	Cem Karaca		rock musician
3	Çağla Şikel		Miss Turkey (1997)
4	Kadi Burhan al-Din		poet, ruler
5	Nuray Hafiftaş		poet, ruler
6	Servet Tazegül		2012 Olympic gold medal winner
7	Servet Çetin		footballer
8	Sinan Şamil Sam		boxer
9	Süreyya Ağaoğlu		first female lawyer in Turkey
10	Tamer Karadağlı		actor
11	Haydar Hatemi		painter
12	Ramil Guliyev		sprinter
13	Ali bey Huseynzade		writer, thinker, philosopher, artist and doctor; creator of the Flag of Azerbaijan
13	Almas Ildyrym		poet
14	Yasin Karaca		footballer
15	Naghi Sheykhzamanli		political figure
16	Sinan Oğan		won a seat in the Turkish parliament in 2011 for Iğdır
17	Aghasi Mammadov		boxer
18	Ahmet Ağaoğlu		political figure
19	Vasıf Arzumanov		wrestler
20	Rasim Başak		professional basketball player
21	Nuri Berköz		general
22	Tuğba Ekinci		pop singer
23	Hafız Süleymanoğlu		weightlifter
24	Alihan Samedov		folk musician
25	Samin Baghtcheban		musician, composer, author and translator
26	Nesrin Javadzadeh		actress
27	Aref Ghafouri		illusionist
28	Kiznaz Türkeli	politician	
29	Süreyya Ağaoğlu		Writer, jurist, and the first female lawyer in Turkish history.
30	Tezer Taskıran		Writer, politician and enlightener.
31	Samet Ağaoğlu		Poet and politician.
32	Abbas Ali Çetin		Politician, lawyer and judge.
33	Elchin Aliyev		Wrestler, sportsman
34	Nuri Saryal		scientist, engineer
35	Yaşar Karadağ		politician
36	Adem Kılıççı		Boxer, old survivor's gamer

== See also ==
- Azerbaijanis in Turkey
- Azerbaijani diaspora
