= Azerbaijanis in Turkey =

Ethnic group

Türkiyə azərbaycanlıları

Total population
- 800,000-4,500,000 (Diaspora Committee of Azerbaijan)

Regions with significant populations
- mostly Northeast Anatolia region

Languages
- Azerbaijani · Turkish

Religion
- mostly Shia Islam (Twelver & Jafari), Sunni Islam

Azerbaijanis in Turkey are Turkish citizens and permanent residents of ethnic Azerbaijani background. According to some estimates, there are currently around 800,000 Twelver Shias in Turkey, however this figure may differ substantially from the real one. There are up to 4,500,000 Azerbaijanis who reside in Turkey, according to information provided by the Diaspora Committee of Azerbaijan, although the factual accuracy, methodology, and criteria used for this figure are disputed. (Note: "However, as of today, no fully reliable statistics exists. According to the non-official information provided by the Diaspora Committee of Azerbaijan, about 4,500,000 Azerbaijanis live in Turkey. It is not clear however what criteria have been used for the calculation, and how many generations of Azerbaijanis as well as which population categories are included in the statistics. Even OECD data are not always reliable.")

The Karapapakh or 'Terekeme' people are often considered a sub-ethnic group of Azerbaijanis of Sunni Muslim background. They are thought to be the largest ethnic groups in the cities of Ardahan, Kars and Iğdır

== History ==
Azerbaijanis first settled in what is now Turkey during the period of Safavi governance over Kars and neighbouring areas. Their numbers grew during the first half of the nineteenth century, when following the Russo-Persian War (1804–1813), the Russo-Persian War (1826–1828) and the respectively out coming Gulistan and Turkmenchay treaties between Persia and Russia, Persia was forced to cede sovereignty over the khanates of Karabakh (1813), Nakhchivan (1828) and Erivan (1828), among others to Russia, and the Treaty of Adrianople gave Christians and Muslims the right to choose a place of residence between Russia and Turkey. Similarly to those of the North Caucasus, large groups of local Muslim population refused to live within Russian boundaries and migrated to Turkey (or Iran) settling in its eastern regions, especially in the Şenkaya district of Erzurum and the Taşlıçay district of Ağrı. The Turkish dialect of Erzurum has been grammatically influenced by the Azerbaijani language. Phonemic analyses indicate that Azerbaijani-influenced dialects are spoken as far as Elâzığ and Van's Erciş district.

In 1813, a group of Azerbaijanis from Karabakh settled in today's Emirdağ district, in the northern part of the Afyon Province. Today their descendants live in the villages of Büyük Karabağ and Orta Karabağ and have recently reestablished cultural ties with their historical homeland through the Turkish International Cooperation and Development Agency. Despite having undergone major assimilation in their language and religious beliefs, they still identify themselves as Karabağlı and are viewed as a distinct group by the local population. A different branch of the same group settled in Iğdır. Caferoğlu argues that the Afyon group may have left Karabakh for Turkey much earlier, in 1578, fighting for the Ottoman Empire in the Second Ottoman–Safavid War.

In addition, in the early nineteenth century, several Sunni families from Shirvan, particularly from Agsu, settled in Amasya, where for a long time they were known as Şirvanlı. In 1894, a unique baroque-style mosque was built here by Şeyh Hacı Mahmut Efendi. The mosque has been known as the Şirvanlı Mosque or the Azerîler Mosque. The descendants of those migrants nowadays live in six villages of Amasya's Suluova and Merzifon districts and have preserved their Azerbaijani identity and culture. Another group of Azerbaijanis from Shaki relocated to Bursa in 1863.

The next wave of Azerbaijani immigration to eastern Turkey took place in 1918–1925, when many Muslim residents of then newly independent Armenia fled their homes, escaping massacres by armed bands of Armenian nationalists. In 1941, already 5,000 Azerbaijanis lived in 60 villages along the Turkish bank of the Arpaçay. They were followed by former members of the overthrown government of the Democratic Republic of Azerbaijan and their families, as well as many upper-class Azerbaijanis, who fled to Turkey in fear of persecution by the Bolsheviks and settled primarily in Istanbul, Bursa and Ankara. Together with other political immigrants from the Caucasus and led by members of the deposed democratic government of Azerbaijan such as Rasulzadeh, Khasmammadov and Sultanov, some of them engaged in anti-Soviet political propaganda and activities in Turkey in an attempt to restore the independence of the Bolshevik-occupied Caucasus states. The signing of Soviet-Turkish non-aggression pacts in 1925 and 1935 created obstacles in continuing this activity in the form of arrests and bans on the publishing of anti-Soviet periodicals. This forced some politically active members of the movement to relocate to Germany and Poland by the late 1930s.

After the failure of the USSR-created regional Azerbaijan People's Government in 1946, ethnic Azerbaijani political immigrants from Iran increased the numbers of Azerbaijanis in Turkey. By 1990, about 400,000 Azerbaijanis lived in a belt of land on the Turkish side of the Soviet border. Iranian Azerbaijanis have emigrated and resettled in large numbers in Istanbul, and many Iranian Azerbaijani students who came to study in Turkey have stayed there after the completion of their studies.

Finally, starting from the early 1990s tens of thousands of immigrants from the newly independent Azerbaijan have made their way to Turkey due to economic reasons, settling mostly in big cities. According to the Turkish Ministry of the Interior, between 2003 and 2013 alone over 15,000 immigrants from Azerbaijan received Turkish citizenship. In addition, as of 2019, there were 36,543 citizens of Azerbaijan residing in Turkey.

In general, the Azerbaijani population in Turkey is considered well-integrated into Turkish society, mainly due to cultural and linguistic affinities between Azerbaijanis and Turks. Nevertheless, differences still remain in the areas of religion (Azerbaijanis are mainly Shi'a, whereas Turks are mostly Sunni), dialect, and self-conception in terms of historical memory and ethnic/national consciousness. In 2011, Sinan Oğan, an ethnic Azerbaijani and a diaspora activist from Iğdır, won a seat in the Turkish parliament as a Nationalist Movement Party candidate. Following the June 2015 election, Kıznaz Türkeli from the Peoples' Democratic Party, another ethnic Azerbaijani, was elected to represent the same province.

== Notable people ==
- Adem Kılıççı, boxer
- Aghasi Mammadov, boxer
- Ali Özgündüz, former public attorney and politician
- Süreyya Ağaoğlu, first female lawyer in Turkish history
- Cem Karaca, musician (Azerbaijani father)
- Haydar Hatemi, Turkish-Iranian Azerbaijani artist
- Samin Baghtcheban, Turkish-Iranian Azerbaijani musician, composer, author and translator
- Elnara Kerimova, Azerbaijani and Turkish conductor and chorus master.
- Melahat Abbasova, Turkish actress and producer
- Sinan Şamil Sam, Turkish-German boxer
- Hafız Süleymanoğlu, Weightlifting, World and European Champion
- Rasim Başak, basketball player
- Servet Tazegül — 2012 Olympic gold medal winner
- Servet Çetin, football player
- Sinan Oğan, politician
- Tamer Karadağlı, Turkish actor
- Alihan Samedov, master player of instruments (balaban, clarinet, tutek, oboe, saxophone), chess master
- Mubariz Mansimov, businessman, billionaire, and founder of Palmali Group of Companies
- Telman Ismailov, businessman, billionaire, and founder of AST Group of Companies
- Samad bey Rafibeyli, Turkish army general
- Ahmet Ağaoğlu, Azerbaijani and Turkish publicist and journalist
- Nesrin Javadzadeh, actress
- Nuri Berköz, Lt.General, General Commander of Turkish Gendarmerie
- Nuri Saryal, scientist, engineer
- Aref Ghafouri, Illusionist
- Yaşar Karadağ, politician
- Yasin Karaca, football player

== See also ==
- Azerbaijan–Turkey relations
- Demographics of Turkey
- Minorities in Turkey
- Turks in Azerbaijan
- List of Azerbaijanis
