= Ehli Beyt Scholars Association =

The Ehli Beyt Scholars Association (Turkish: Ehlibeyt Alimleri Derneği, abbr. Ehla-Der) is the main Turkish Jaafari Shia organization founded on 31 May 2011 in Istanbul. Its present chairman is Kadir Akaras.

The Twelver Shia community represents 3% of the Muslim population in Turkey, more than three million members, most of whom are ethnic Azeris who live in the eastern provinces neighbouring to Azerbaijan, more particularly in the Iğdır and Kars provinces, and in Istanbul in neighbourhoods close to the airport (Halkalı, Bakırkoÿ) and on the Asian side to the East of Kadiköy (Kayışdağı). They have 70 mosques in Istanbul and some 300 throughout the country and receive no state funding for their mosques and imams as the Presidency of Religious Affairs (Diyanet) is exclusively Sunni.
