= Orfeon =

Orfeon or Orfeón (Spanish "choir") may refer to:

== Choirs ==
- Orfeon Académico de Coimbra, a Portuguese choir group
- Orfeon Chamber Choir, a Turkish choir group
- Orfeón Donostiarra, a Spanish Basque choir

== Record labels ==
- Orfeón (Mexican record label)
- Orfeon Records, a Turkish record label
