= Elnara Kerimova =

Azerbaijani-Turkish musician (born 1962)

Elnara Kerimova Elnarə Kərimova
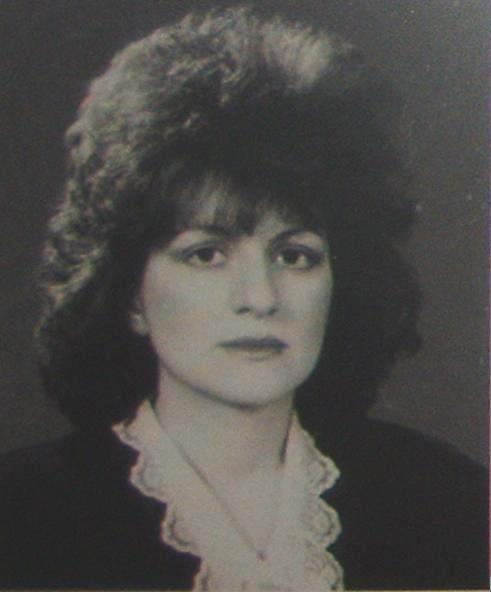

Background information
- Born: 1962 (age 62–63); Baku, Azerbaijan SSR
- Occupation(s): conductor and chorus master
- Education: Azerbaijan National Conservatory Music College

Elnara Nadir gizi Kerimova, also spelled Karimova (Azerbaijani: Elnarə Nadir qızı Kərimova; born 1962 in Baku) is an Azerbaijani and Turkish conductor and chorus master, People's Artiste of Azerbaijan (2018).

== Contributions ==
Born in Baku, Azerbaijan, Elnara Kerimova studied choir conducting at the Asaf Zeynally Music College and later at the Baku Academy of Music. While still receiving her professional training at the Zeynalli College she became a chorister for the Azerbaijan State Polyphonic Choir. She was promoted to chief conductor of the choir in 1988. Within the next four years, the orchestra guided by Kerimova toured Russia, Ukraine, Turkey, Estonia, Latvia, and Belarus.

In 1992, Kerimova was invited to Turkey by the Ministry of Culture to conduct the TRT Ankara Radio Polyphonic Choir. With this choir, she participated in various festivals and has given more than 300 concerts. Kerimova has been entrusted important positions at various educational institutions, such as Ankara State Conservatory and Bilkent University, and amateur choirs. She has taken the responsibility to develop and improve the choral music while also popularizing this genre throughout Turkey.

Starting from May 1999 Elnara Kerimova has been working as a conductor for the Orfeon Chamber Choir. With this choir, she won awards at festivals in England, Canada, and Austria and performed concerts in Belgium, Pakistan, Israel, Japan, and China.

In 2009, Kerimova worked on the choral scenes from Uzeyir Hajibeyov's opera Koroghlu as part of an international project presented by TURKSOY. In 2010, she established the Buta chamber choir at the initiative of the Ministry of Culture and Tourism of Azerbaijan. In 2015, she won a gold medal at the European Choir Games in Magdeburg, Germany, with the TURKSOY chamber choir.

In 2011, she was awarded the title of Honored Artiste of Azerbaijan, and in 2018, she received the title of People's Artiste Azerbaijan.
