= Türk Yurdu =

Turkish political magazine

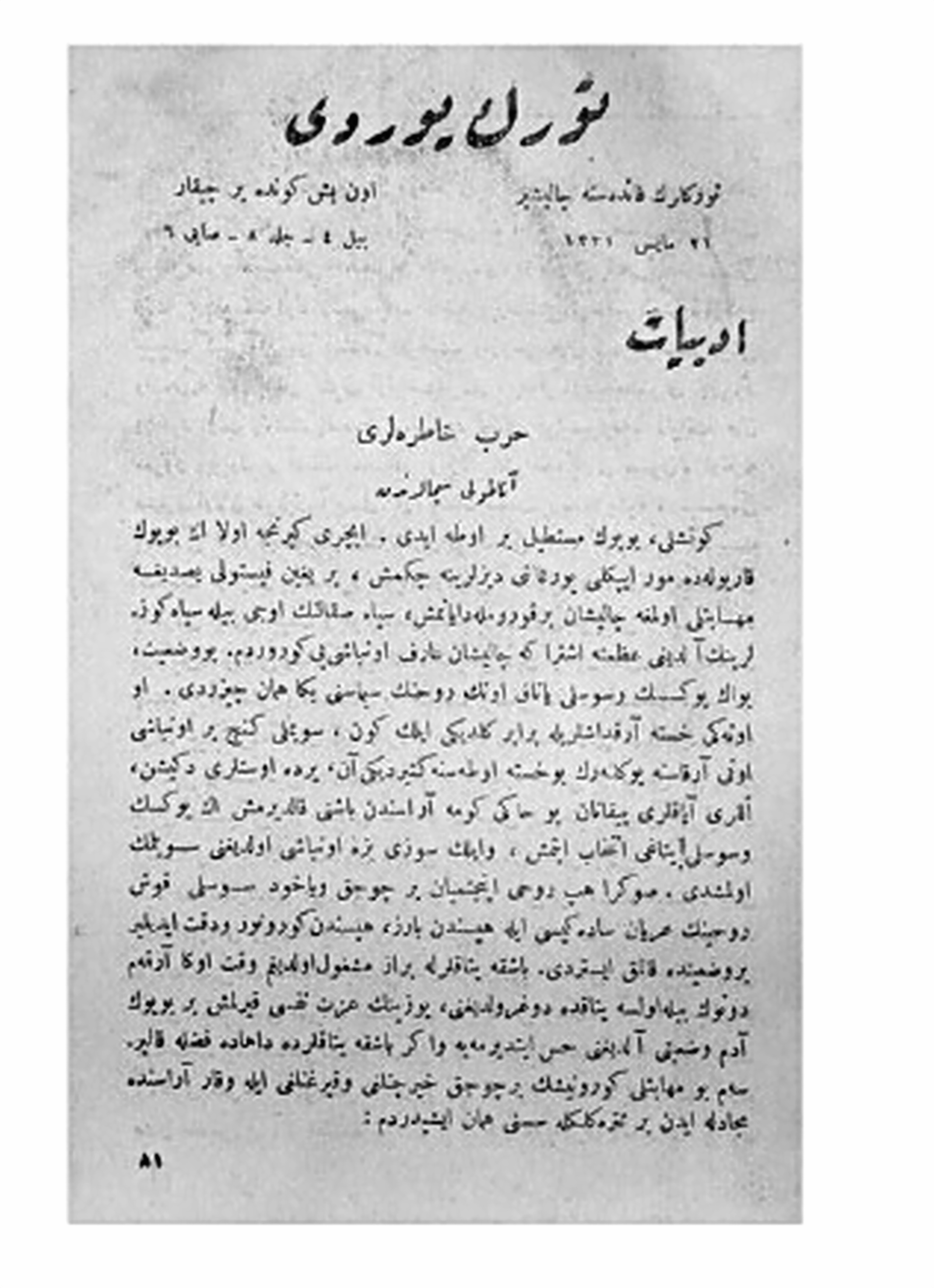
- a page from Türk Yurdu, 1915
- Frequency: Monthly
- Founder: Yusuf Akçura, Ahmet Ağaoğlu et al.
- Founded: 1911
- First issue: November 1911
- Country: Turkey
- Based in: Ankara
- Language: Turkish
- Website: https://www.turkyurdu.com.tr

Türk Yurdu is a monthly Turkish magazine that was first published on the 30 November 1911. It was an important magazine propagating Pan-Turkism. It was founded by Yusuf Akçura, Ahmet Ağaoğlu, Ali Hüseynzade. Ziya Gökalp said: "all Turkists... met and worked together in the Türk Yurdu and Türk Ocağı ambiance." The magazine was one of the early Turkish periodicals which featured articles on folklore.

Yusuf Akçura was editor of the magazine from 1911 to 1917. From 11 April 1913, a weekly named Halka Doğru was published in Istanbul as a supplement to the Türk Yurdu. Halka Doğru closed in April 1914, but its editor, Celal Sahir, began publishing another weekly supplement to the Türk Yurdu, the Türk Sözü, on 13 April 1914. In 1917, the management of the magazine passed to Celal Sahir, and in August 1918 Türk Yurdu was closed due to financial reasons. In 1924 it was relaunched in Ankara as an organ of the Turkish Hearths.

== Notable authors ==
Notable writers for Türk Yurdu include:

- Ömer Seyfeddin
- Ahmet Aĝaoĝlu
- Ziya Gökalp
- Mehmet Emin Yurdakul
- Ali Hüseyinzade
- Mehmed Fuad Köprülü
- Halide Edib
- İsmail Hakkı Baltacıoğlu (contributed to the magazine between 1914 and 1920)
- Hilmi Ziya Ülken
