= Between Two Empires =

Book by A. Holly Shissler about Ahmet Ağaoğlu

Between Two Empires: Ahmet Ağaoğlu and the New Turkey
- Author: A. Holly Shissler
- Language: English
- Publisher: I.B. Tauris
- Publication date: 2002

Between Two Empires: Ahmet Ağaoğlu and the New Turkey is a 2002 book about Ahmet Ağaoğlu by A. Holly Shissler, published by I.B. Tauris.

== Subject matter ==
The book is a case study of Ahmet Ağaoğlu, covering religion, society, nationality and their interactions. Sam Kaplan describes the book: "Between Two Empires is the story of an intellectual's struggle to reorganize social relations in the Muslim and Turkic world, first into a morally homogenous community, and later following World War 1, into politically exclusive nations—all the while upholding a liberal individualistic rapport to society."

== Reception ==
Kaplan praised the book as a case study but noted that as a republished dissertation, it would have benefited from further editing.

Kemal Karpat found some "blemishes" but praised the book's "wide theoretical scope, penetrating comparative analyses, and multifaceted qualities."

Feroz Ahmad wrote that Shissler accomplished her goal of providing an analysis of Ağaoğlu's intellectual development and called the book "a compelling account of a life that had a dramatic impact on two empires and a nation-state."

Michelangelo Guida noted minor errors in transcription of Turkish names, but ultimately suggested that the book was helpful in understanding Ağaoğlu as an important figure in the early years of the Republic of Turkey.
