= Hakimiyet-i Milliye =

Turkish newspaper

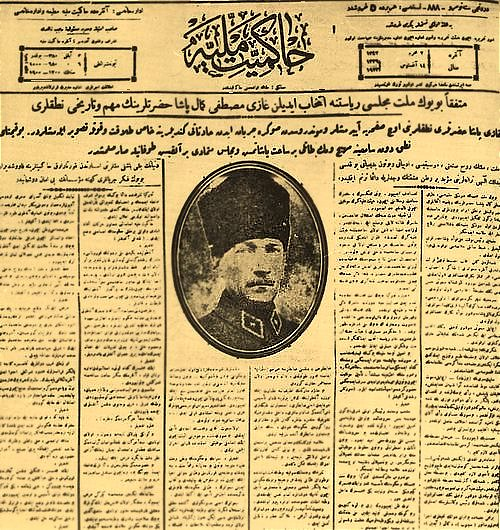

Hakimiyet-i Milliye (Turkish: National Sovereignty) was a Turkish newspaper established by Atatürk in 1920. Headquartered in Ankara, it functioned as the major newspaper of Turkish nationalist movement during the Turkish War of Independence.

The first editor was Ahmet Ağaoğlu. Atatürk published editorials in the newspaper. Falih Rıfkı Atay was among its regular contributors. It was renamed Ulus in 1934.
