= Iğdır (electoral district) =

Electoral district for the Grand National Assembly of Turkey

Coordinates: 37°50′N 34°45′E

- electoral district for the Grand National Assembly of Turkey
- Iğdır shown within Turkey
- Province: Iğdır
- Electorate: 119,655

Current electoral district
- Created: 1923
- Seats: 2
- MPs: List: Cantürk Alagöz AKP Yılmaz Hun DEM
- Turnout at last election: 77.92%
- Representation
- AK Party: 1 / 2
- DEM: 1 / 2

Iğdır is an electoral district of the Grand National Assembly of Turkey. It elects two members of parliament (deputies) to represent the province of the same name for a four-year term by the D'Hondt method, a party-list proportional representation system.

== Members ==
Population reviews of each electoral district are conducted before each general election, which can lead to certain districts being granted a smaller or greater number of parliamentary seats.

Iğdır has consistently returned two MPs since the 1999 parliamentary election. It is one of the only districts in which both Turkish nationalist and Kurdish nationalist parties have a significant electoral presence.

MPs for Iğdır, 1999 onwards
Election	1999 (21st Parliament)	2002 (22nd Parliament)	2007 (23rd Parliament)	2011 (24th Parliament)	June 2015 (25th Parliament)	November 2015 (26th Parliament)	2018 (27th Parliament)
MP	Ali Güner; MHP	Dursun Akdemir; Independent	Ali Güner; AK Party	Sinan Oğan; MHP	Mehmet Emin Adıyaman; HDP	Mehmet Emin Adıyaman; HDP	Habip Eksik; HDP
MP	Abbas Boyzel; Virtue	Yücel Artantaş; CHP	Pervin Buldan; Independent		Kıznaz Türkeli; HDP	Nurettin Aras; AK Party	Yaşar Karadağ; MHP

== General elections ==
=== 2011 ===
2011 general election: Iğdır
Party	Candidate	Votes	%	±%
MHP	1 elected ▲1: 1. Sinan Oğan ✓; 2. Gündüz Güneş ✗	27,554	34.09	▲18.93
Independent	1 elected 0: Pervin Buldan ✓	25,437	31.48	▼9.05
AK Party	None elected ▼1: 1. Yaşar Akkuş ✗; 2. Nurettin Aras ✗	22,860	28.29	▼0.63
CHP	None elected: 1. Ekber Taner ✗; 2. Behman Göğce ✗	1,374	1.70	▼6.66
Büyük Birlik	None elected: 1. Halide Demirel ✗; 2. Filiz Akın ✗	1,222	1.51	▲1.51
DSP	None elected: 1. Erkan Tutka ✗; 2. Tahir Kavri ✗	914	1.13	N/A
HAS Party	None elected: 1. Ayhan Kaya ✗; 2. Edip Emre Şeriati ✗	290	0.36	▲0.36
TKP	None elected: 1. Serkan Parıltı ✗; 2. Ödül Eda Çakıcıoğlu ✗	254	0.31	▼0.27
DP	None elected: 1. Abdullah Güngör ✗; 2. İhsan Çetin ✗	253	0.31	▼3.95
DYP	None elected: 1. İsmail Parlak ✗; 2. Erkan Deniz ✗	226	0.28	▲0.28
SAADET	None elected: 1. Nadir Akar ✗; 2. Sabri Doğru ✗	173	0.21	▼0.07
Nationalist Conservative	None elected: 1. Sadettin Koç ✗; 2. Cuma Uzun ✗	104	0.13	▲0.13
HEPAR	None elected: 1. Zehra Polat ✗; 2. Çağdaş Özerez ✗	78	0.10	▲0.10
MP	None elected: 1. Yasin Yılmaz ✗; 2. Seher Karaardıç ✗	53	0.07	▲0.07
Liberal Democrat	None elected: 1. Nurdan Alpsan ✗; 2. Sinan Dereci ✗	24	0.03	▼0.06
Labour	No candidates	0	0.00	0.00
Total votes		80,816	100.00	
Rejected ballots		1,611	1.96	▲0.97
Turnout		82,280	75.84	▲3.12
MHP gain from Independent Majority		2,117	2.47	▼9.03

=== June 2015 ===
Abbr.	Party	Votes	%
HDP	Peoples' Democratic Party	53,844	56.7%
MHP	Nationalist Movement Party	25,700	27.1%
AK Party	Justice and Development Party	10,293	10.8%
CHP	Republican People's Party	3,409	3.6%
	Other	1,663	1.8%
Total		94,909	
Turnout		83.20	
source: YSK

=== November 2015 ===
Abbr.	Party	Votes	%
HDP	Peoples' Democratic Party	48,975	52.6%
AK Party	Justice and Development Party	28,816	31%
MHP	Nationalist Movement Party	11,790	12.7%
CHP	Republican People's Party	1,620	1.7%
	Other	1,836	2%
Total		93,037	
Turnout		82.08	
source: YSK

=== 2018 ===
Abbr.	Party	Votes	%
HDP	Peoples' Democratic Party	41,057	45.1%
MHP	Nationalist Movement Party	21,885	24%
AK Party	Justice and Development Party	17,737	19.5%
IYI	Good Party	5,336	5.9%
CHP	Republican People's Party	2,141	2.3%
SP	Felicity Party	1,836	2%
	Other	1,123	1.2%
Total		91,115	
Turnout		77.97	
source: YSK

== Presidential elections ==
=== 2014 ===
2014 presidential election: Iğdır
Party	Candidate	Votes	%
HDP	Selahattin Demirtaş	30,281	42.94
Independent	Ekmeleddin İhsanoğlu	21,280	30.17
AK Party	Recep Tayyip Erdoğan	18,964	26.89
Total votes		70,525	100.00
Rejected ballots		910	1.27
Turnout		71,435	63.40
Selahattin Demirtaş win			
