= Ahmet Ağaoğlu =

Turkish politician (1869–1939)

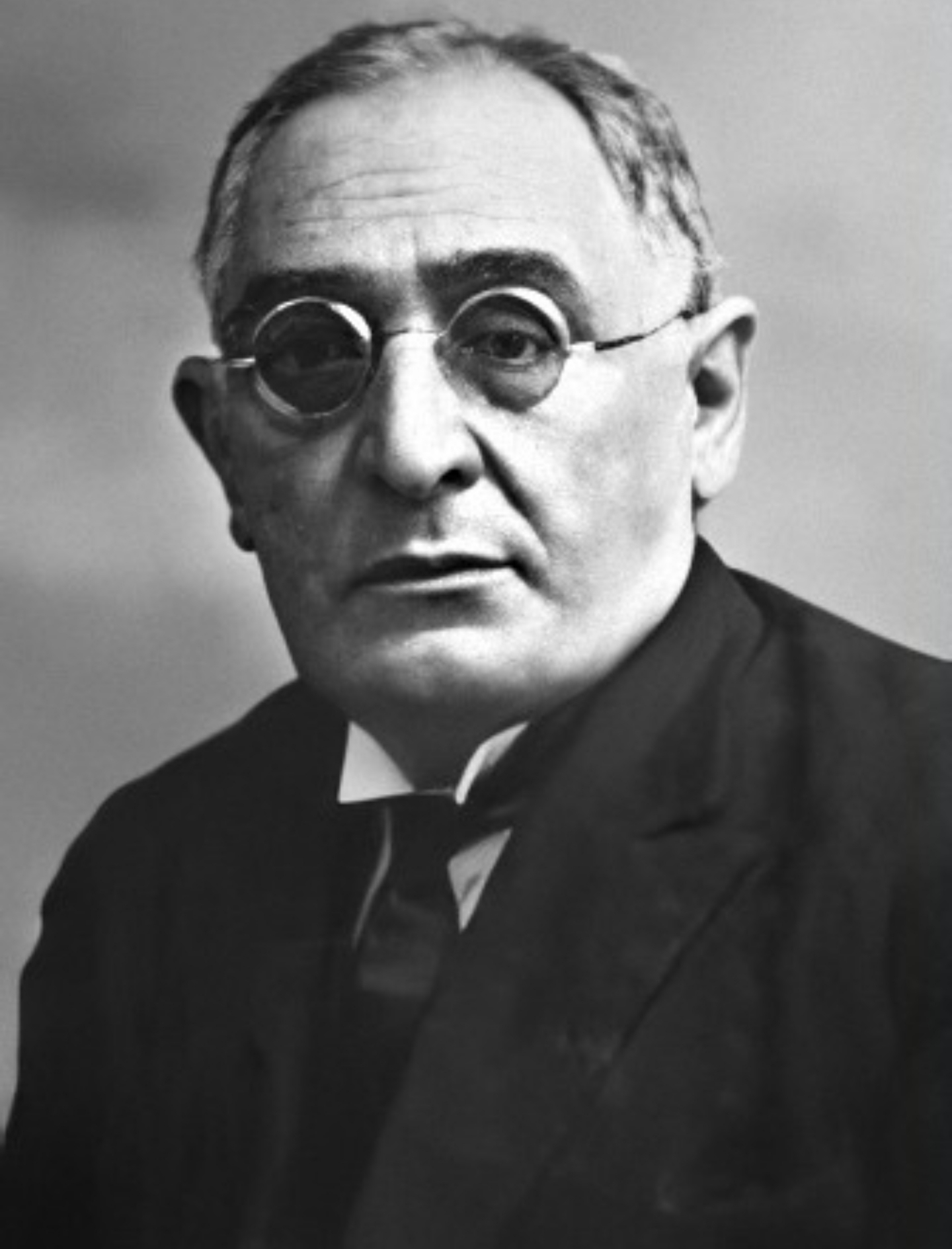
- Born: December 1869; Shusha, Shusha uezd, Elisabethpol Governorate, Russian Empire
- Died: 19 May 1939 (aged 69–70); Istanbul, Turkey
- Resting place: Feriköy Cemetery, Istanbul, Turkey
- Occupations: Journalist and politician
- Children: 5, including Samet, Süreyya and Tezer
- Relatives: Neriman Ağaoğlu (daughter-in-law)

Ahmet Ağaoğlu, also known as Ahmed Bey Aghaoghlu (Azerbaijani: Əhməd bəy Ağaoğlu; or Ahmed Akif Aghaoghlu (December 1869, Shusha – May 19, 1939, Istanbul) was a public and political figure of Azerbaijan and Turkey, thinker, publicist, educator, writer, Turkologist, and the founder of liberal Kemalism.

After studying in France, he returned and opened the first library and reading room in Shusha in 1896. In 1897, he moved to Baku at the invitation of H. Z. Taghiyev and wrote articles for the Kaspi newspaper. He also worked with A. Huseynzade as an editor for the Hayat newspaper and served as chief editor for Irshad, Taraqqi, Progres, Tercüman-ı Hakikat, Hakimiyet-i Milliye, and Akın newspapers.

In 1905, he secretly founded the Muslim Difai Party to fight against the Tsarist government and Dashnaks. After being persecuted by the Tsarist government, Ahmet Bey lived secretly in his friends' homes for months. To avoid arrest, he relocated to Istanbul at the end of 1908. As a prominent figure in the Turkish Hearths national movement, Ağaoğlu was elected president of a congress held by the movement. Later, he joined the Young Turks' Committee of Union and Progress. Alongside serving as the director of a library in Suleymaniye and an active contributor to the Türk Yurdu journal, he taught Turkic-Mongol history and Russian language at Istanbul University.

In 1918, he served as the political advisor to the commander of the Islamic Army of the Caucasus, which came to assist the Azerbaijan Democratic Republic. On December 26, 1918, he was elected as a member of the Parliament of the Azerbaijan Democratic Republic from the Zangezur district as a neutral representative. However, he later declined the membership. Aghaoghlu was also part of the delegation sent by the Republic to participate in the Paris Peace Conference. Upon reaching Istanbul, he was arrested along with other leaders of the Committee of Union and Progress by the British and exiled to the island of Malta.

After returning from exile, he led the Press Information Office in Ankara, served as the chief editor of the Hakimiyet-i Milliye newspaper, and, after being elected to the second and third terms of the Turkish Grand National Assembly, became Mustafa Kemal Atatürk's political advisor on foreign affairs.

On May 7, 2019, by Decision No. 211 of the Cabinet of Ministers of the Republic of Azerbaijan, Ahmet Ağaoğlu was included in the list of authors whose works are declared state property in Azerbaijan.

== Life ==
=== Early life ===
Ahmet Ağaoğlu was born in 1869 in the city of Shusha, Azerbaijan. His father, Mirza Hasan Bey, was from the Kurdlar clan of Karabakh. This tribe had migrated from Erzurum, which was predominantly inhabited by ethnic Azerbaijani Turks in the 18th century, to Ganja, and later settled in Karabakh. His father, Mirza Hasan Bey, was a wealthy cotton farmer. The title mirza granted to his father indicates that the family belonged to the intellectual class. His grandfather, Mirza Ibrahim, was one of the most renowned scholars of Shusha. He was a calligrapher and wrote poetry in the Turkish language. Additionally, his uncles were proficient in Turkish, as well as Persian, Arabic, and Russian. His mother, Taza Hanim, was the daughter of Rafi Bey from the Sarijali clan of Shusha and the sister of Zeynalabdin Bey Rafibeyov.

Raymond Kévorkian notes that Ağaoğlu was descended from a family of dönmes, Turkish-speaking Jews who had earlier converted to Islam.

== Education ==
=== Secondary education ===
Ahmet Ağaoğlu noted in his memoirs that his mother and uncle played a significant role in his education. His uncle, Mirza Mahammad, wanted Ahmet to become a mujtahid and hired teachers to teach him Persian and Arabic from the age of six. Initially, Agaoglu studied at a neighborhood school, but at his mother's initiative, he also secretly took Russian lessons. Despite being religious, his mother disliked clerics and mullahs. Agaoglu wrote that her views redirected his education from Najaf and Karbala to St. Petersburg and Paris.

In 1881, when a six-grade secondary school was opened in Shusha, the Karabakh governor gathered the local Muslim community at Khurshidbanu Natavan's house, urging them to enroll their children in the school. Ahmet's father promised the governor that he would send him to the Shusha Real School. Two of his teachers at this school—history teacher Shineyovski and mathematics teacher Palekarp—had a significant influence on him. Both were opponents of the Tsarist regime and promoted revolutionary ideas within the school. It was here that Agaoglu first encountered Western ideologies. In his memoirs, Ahmet Ağaoğlu wrote that the school was located in the Armenian neighborhood of the city, and among the 45 students, only five were Muslim. He falsely claimed that Armenian students were very hostile toward Turks, constantly harassing the Turkish pupils. Four of the Turkish students could not endure this environment and left the school, but Ahmet persevered and successfully completed his studies. He described these events in his memoirs as follows:

During the years of our education, it is impossible to put into words the suffering we endured from the Armenian children. During recess, we, the five Turkish children, considered it a great skill to quickly back ourselves against the wall. Hundreds of Armenian children would suddenly attack us; one would grab our hats and throw them, others would kick the Bukhara fur, worth four or five gold, rolling it across the ground. Some would grab the hems of our valuable coats, often made of camel wool, pulling and tearing them, removing their decorations. If we tried to resist, we would be crushed under punches, slaps, and kicks. Sometimes, they would fabricate an accusation against us, join forces as witnesses, and have us unjustly punished. Most of my companions could not endure it and left the school. Until the final grade, I was the only Turk who managed to persevere.

After completing the sixth grade of secondary school, Ahmet Ağaoğlu attended the seventh and final grades at Gymnasium No. 1 in Tiflis. According to his own writings, he was the only Turk at the Tiflis gymnasium. During his studies in Tiflis, he participated in secret meetings of the Narodnik Society at the insistence of his friends. These meetings left a profound impression on his thinking. After successfully graduating from the gymnasium in Tiflis, Agaoglu returned to Shusha with a distinction diploma and a prize of three hundred rubles. He spent the entire summer in the highlands with his uncle and then traveled to St. Petersburg to continue his education.

=== Higher education ===
==== Petersburg period ====
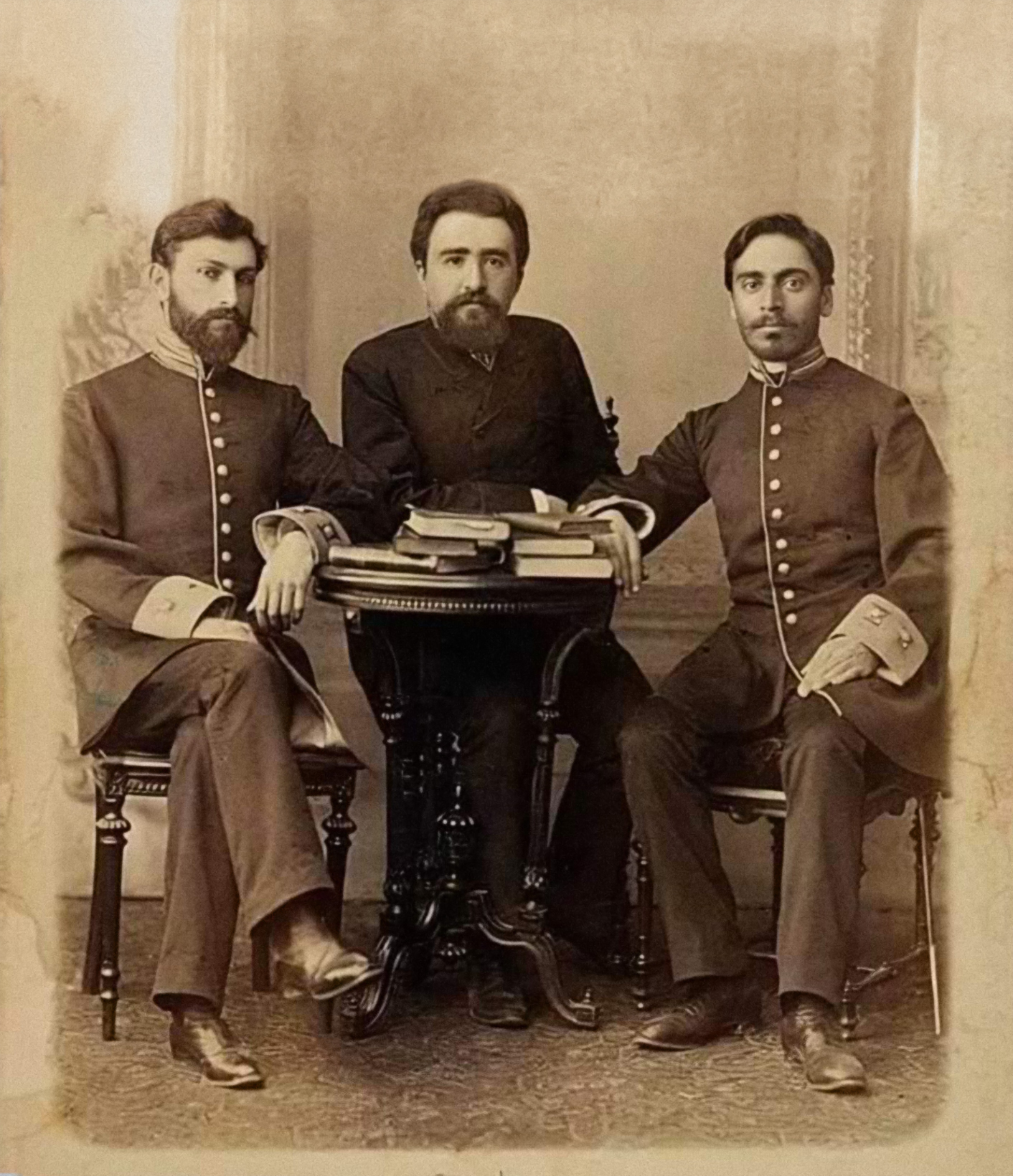
On the left is Ali bey Huseynzade, in the middle is Alimardan bey Topchubashov, on the right is Nasir bey Tahirov (St. Petersburg, 1887)

In August 1887, Agaoglu went to St. Petersburg to pursue higher education and rented a room in the home of a Christian family. The family was very surprised to learn that Agaoglu was Turkish, as until then, only Armenians and members of other Christian ethnicities had come to St. Petersburg for higher education. The family knew of no Turks pursuing education there, and Agaoglu understood their astonishment, given that Armenians and other Christians had pursued education before Turks.

The Caucasian youth Agaoglu met in St. Petersburg took him to the dormitory of the Caucasian Students' Union, where he discovered that there were four other Turks. Among them was Alimardan Topchubashov, who would later represent Azerbaijan in Paris, and Ali Bey Huseynzade, the grandson of a former Caucasian Sheikh ul-Islam. The other two Turkish students were studying civil engineering. Agaoglu successfully passed all his exams at the Technological Institute. However, during his final exam in algebra, he solved the problem outside the standard program. The professor, assuming Agaoglu was Jewish, refused to accept his answer despite its correctness. This incident deeply disappointed Agaoglu and fostered a strong sense of hatred toward Russians. He described those days in his memoirs as follows:

The injustice done to me burned me from within. The disappointment mixed with a blow to my pride was tormenting me. My anger was so intense that I was ready to drown all of Russia in a spoonful of water. From the Tsar to the nihilist, from professors at the university to the press and literature, from the language to the science—anyone or anything that carried the Russian name or the Russian scent, I harbored deep hatred, rage, and hostility toward.

No, no, I cannot stay here. I cannot live in St. Petersburg. I must leave. But where, and how?

I was only 19 years old. Ah, the boldness, the heat, the carefreeness, and the initiative that come with that age! A voice inside me screamed, 'Paris, Paris!' Yes, I will go to Paris. I will study there, graduate from its university, and in this way, I will take a burning revenge on the Russians, and at the same time, I will elevate my own sense of dignity to the highest level.

==== Paris period ====
On January 8, 1888, Ahmet Ağaoğlu arrived in Paris. During his train journey, a woman he met suggested that he stay at Hotel de Peterbourg, a place frequented by visitors from Russia. With no acquaintances in Paris and not knowing French, he headed to the hotel. However, it quickly became clear that the hotel expenses were high. An employee of the hotel introduced him to two Georgian students studying in Paris through mutual friends. The Georgian students helped him find a room to rent. After settling in a room rented from an elderly woman, he began learning French. However, after a while, he ran out of money and fell into debt. Later, with money sent from home, he paid off his debts and moved into a boarding house on Rue de Glacier. Here, he met two Iranians and three Egyptians. Following their advice, he started attending lectures at the College de France and the École des Hautes Études Pratiques. At the College de France, French philosopher and historian Ernest Renan delivered weekly lectures, while at the École des Hautes Études Pratiques, James Darmesteter gave lectures on The History of Eastern Peoples. Both figures played a significant role in shaping Ahmet Ağaoğlu's intellectual development. In the 1888–1889 academic year, he began studying law at the Sorbonne. However, his interests were not limited to law alone. He developed a fascination with the history of Eastern civilizations and religions and enrolled in the School of Oriental Languages. There, he took lessons from experts in Eastern languages, such as Charles Schefer and Barber de Meynard. Later, upon the advice of James Darmesteter, he joined the intellectual club organized by Juliette Adam, founder and editor of La Nouvelle Revue. This exclusive club gathered intellectuals in France who engaged in discussions on politics, science, history, and philosophy. Between 1891 and 1893, Ahmet Ağaoğlu published a series of articles titled Persian Society in La Nouvelle Revue. In 1892, he gave a lecture at the International Congress of Orientalists in London on Beliefs in Mazdakism in Shia Islam. The text of the lecture was later published in several Western languages at the expense of Cambridge University.

== Activity ==
Ahmet Ağaoğlu published his articles on social and political topics in French press outlets such as Journal de Débat, Revü Been, and Nouvye Revyü. The articles he wrote in France were sent to newspapers like Kavkaz and Sharki Rus.

After completing his education in France in 1894, Ahmet Ağaoğlu returned to Tiflis, where he taught French at a local gymnasium for two years. He continued his collaboration with Kavkaz newspaper during this time. In 1896, he returned to Shusha. There, he began teaching French at the Shusha Real School and opened the first library and reading room in the city. For this reason, the people of Shusha started calling him "Firəng Əhməd" (French Ahmet). However, after he left Shusha, the reading room and library ceased their activities.

Ahmet Ağaoğlu believed in the importance of newspaper publishing to spread his ideas. However, after the Kashkul newspaper was closed in 1891, the Caucasus Censorship Committee imposed a ban on printing newspapers in Azerbaijani. At the same time, 19 newspapers in Armenian and Georgian were operating within the Russian Empire. At the end of the 19th century, when Mohammad Shahtakhtinski tried to get permission to publish a newspaper in Azerbaijani, the head of the Russian Empire's Printing Department, Solovyov, told him, "I definitely cannot allow a newspaper to be printed in Azerbaijani. What need does your people have for a newspaper? Your intellectuals should read in Russian, and the simple Azerbaijanis should just let their sheep graze."

In 1896, Haji Zeynalabdin Taghiyev purchased the newspaper Kaspi and handed it over to the Azerbaijani intellectuals. The newspaper became a platform for the national intelligentsia, with articles written by prominent figures like Ali Mardan bey Topchubashov, Ali bey Huseynzadeh, Hasan bey Zardabi, and Firidun bey Kocherli. In 1897, at the invitation of Haji Zeynalabdin Taghiyev, Ahmet Ağaoğlu moved to Baku to work for Kaspi. After settling in Baku, his articles mostly addressed the issues of the Muslim society, focusing on women's problems. He believed that the path to national liberation lay through the cultural and educational advancement of society. He was one of the first intellectuals to call for equal rights for women in Azerbaijan, promoting the idea that women's freedom was a key factor in the struggle for liberation. His contributions to Kaspi led to the newspaper becoming more popular, with its circulation reaching up to 10,000 copies at certain times, a significant achievement for a daily newspaper. In his series of articles, Women in the Islamic World and Islam, Akhund and Hatif al-Ghayb, he criticized the religious establishment, particularly the imams and clerics, arguing that they had caused harm to Islam. The articles were not well received by religious leaders, and as a result, a fatwa was issued for his death. According to his son, Samet Ağaoğlu, he was confined to his home for six months, with police protection provided for his safety. It was only through Taghiyev's intervention that he was saved from this dangerous situation.

Ahmet Ağaoğlu considered the backwardness of women and the power of the clerics as the two main enemies and incurable wounds of the Muslim world. In his work Женщина по исламу и в исламе (Woman in the Islamic World), he stated that:

Only when a mother and woman possess free, independent thinking, can a Muslim woman purposefully fulfill her social functions; only under these conditions can she educate her children in character and will, and be capable of applying the feelings and thoughts necessary for public life.

In 1905, Ahmet Ağaoğlu was elected as a member of the Baku City Duma and served there until 1909. During this period, he contributed to the resolution of many of the city's problems. He was a member of the education commission and a member of the Board of Trustees of the Baku Commercial School.

After the Russian Tsar's decree on February 18, 1905, to improve the living conditions of the population and strengthen state-building, Azerbaijani intellectuals gathered on March 15, 1905, at Haji Zeynalabdin Tağıyev's house to discuss their proposals. They formed a delegation to convey the demands and proposals of Azerbaijani Turks to St. Petersburg. The delegation included Ahmet Ağaoğlu, Alimardan bey Topchubashov, and Ali bey Huseynzade. Upon arriving in St. Petersburg, Ağaoğlu published an article titled The Truths about the Baku Events in the Sankt-Peterburgskie Vedomosti newspaper.

On April 16, 1905, Ahmet Ağaoğlu, Ali bey Hüseynzade, and Alimardan bey Topchubashov sent a letter to the Governor-General of the Caucasus requesting the publication of the Azerbaijani-language newspaper Hayat. On April 22, they received a positive response to their request. On June 7, 1905, with the support of Haji Zeynalabdin Tağıyev, the first issue of the Hayat newspaper was published. After leaving Hayat, Ahmet Ağaoğlu founded the daily newspaper İrşad with the financial support of Isa bey Aşurbeyov. He led the newspaper from 1905 to 1908, and its circulation soon reached 3,000 copies. According to Tadeusz Svetokhovski, the newspaper addressed societal issues in a more radical manner compared to other newspapers published at the time. This is why the newspaper was banned by Sultan Abdulhamid II in the Ottoman Empire.

In 1905, after Illarion Vorontsov-Dashkov was appointed as the Viceroy of the Transcaucasus, he began a process to reconcile relations with the Armenians. With the backing of the governor, the Armenians proposed the relocation of the villages around Baku, which were located in the industrial region, arguing it was necessary to ensure the safety of the oil fields after a large fire broke out in the Baku oil fields in August 1905. The matter was even discussed by the Council of Ministers of the Russian Empire. To protect the interests of the local population, Ahmet Ağaoğlu and Alimardan bey Topchubashov traveled to St. Petersburg. As a result of their efforts, after 35 days of discussions, the relocation of the villages' populations was prevented.

In February 1906, a peace conference was held in Tiflis, initiated by Vorontsov-Dashkov in order to put an end to the Armenian-Muslim massacres. During the conference, Muslim representatives, including Ahmet Ağaoğlu, Alimardan bey Topchubashov, Adil khan Ziyadkhanov, and others, alleged that the Armenian Revolutionary Federation (Dashnaktsutyun) had been the initial organizer and executor of the massacres and terrorism committed in South Caucasus. They further alleged that the official government circles had turned a blind eye to the actions of this organization.

In his final speech, Ahmet Ağaoğlu said the following...

We say that if you really want peace, you must eliminate terror along with other initiatives. In response, we are told that we are talking about the Dashnaktsutyun. We never mentioned Dashnaktsutyun in our opinion. What we are saying is that terror should be stopped. However, in the minds of the Armenians, Dashnaktsutyun comes to mind. It seems that there is a connection between Dashnaktsutyun and this terror. But again, I repeat, we have nothing to do with Dashnaktsutyun. Nothing! Because the other day, Mr. [Alexander] Khatisov, in his eloquent and fluent speech, openly stated that Dashnaktsutyun serves the ideas and beliefs of Russia's high-ranking officials, generals, and even the Governor-General of the Caucasus, and that it has been organized for fifteen years, with its own army, treasury, and soldiers. When we, the Muslim representatives, heard this, we were astonished and amazed, and we thought to ourselves: now that this is the case, now that an armed party has been organized for fifteen years, and government officials are aware of it and not only tolerate it but also share its views, it is useless for us to expect this party to be removed by either the government or the Armenians. We should just take matters into our own hands. We also need to have perfect and armed parties. We too need to have our own Dashnaktsutyuns. A government that tolerates such activities on one side must also tolerate it on the other side, or else there will be chaos.

In August 1906, Ahmet Ağaoğlu came to Shusha and gathered Azerbaijani intellectuals to discuss the situation in the region. With his suggestion, the Difai Party was founded. Officially, the party was called the Caucasian General Muslim Defense Committee. The party's branches or commissions were established in almost all cities and districts of Azerbaijan and South Caucasus, even in Vladikavkaz. He personally participated in the creation of the party's district branches. For this purpose, he toured all of Karabakh and urged 'all Muslims to unite tightly around the party.' The organizers of the party also carried out propaganda among the Azerbaijani population in Dagestan. Due to his activities, Ahmet Ağaoğlu was persecuted and had to go into hiding for a while. He describes those days in his memoirs as follows:

I was among those severely persecuted. The situation reached a point where not only my own peace and security, but also that of my family, began to be jeopardized. In 1908, a revolution took place in Turkey. Some individuals I knew had come to power. At the same time, the Governor-General of the Caucasus, Count Vorontsov-Dashkov, seemed to be determined to arrest and exile me. As soon as I learned this, I immediately decided to flee, and by the end of 1908, I escaped to Istanbul.

Ağaoğlu was in turn accused by Armenians of having played a direct role in inciting Muslims to carry out massacres against Armenians in the 1905 disturbances.

=== Ottoman Empire ===
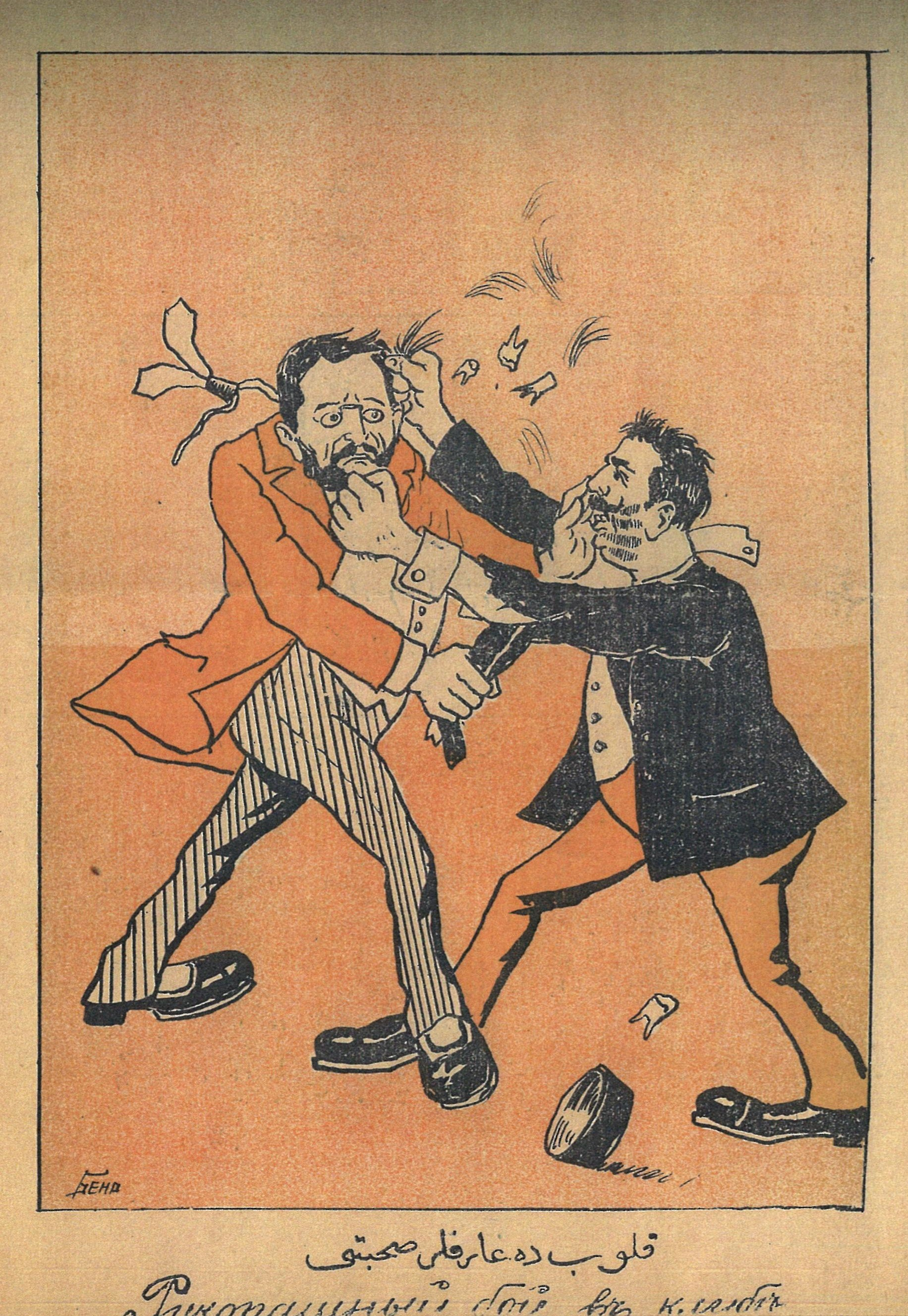
Zanbur magazine (No. 14, 1909) about the beating of Ahmet Ağaoğlu

After months of living secretly in the homes of his friends, due to persecution and the threat of arrest, in the middle of 1909, he had to move to Istanbul. In Istanbul, he worked as an inspector in the field of education and later became the director of the Süleymaniye Library. During his time as an inspector, he visited all of Istanbul's private, public primary, and secondary schools, and based on his observations, he prepared a report on the current situation and proposed reforms. He believed that solving the problems in education played a crucial role in the country's future. In October 1909, he began teaching Turkish-Mongolian history and Russian at the Istanbul University. During this period, Ahmet Ağaoğlu's Turkism ideology became the central focus of his activities. His university role wasn't limited to teaching; he was also actively involved in organizing and improving education. In 1911, he was elected the head of the reform commission for the Faculty of Philology and later became the dean of the faculty. After getting his affairs in order, he wrote a letter to his family, stating that he was considering staying in Turkey. His wife, Sitare Hanim, agreed to come to Turkey as well. In 1910, he moved his family to Istanbul.

After moving to Istanbul, Ahmet Ağaoğlu continued his journalistic activities and from 1909 onwards, he published a series of articles on topics such as Letters from Turkey and The National Question in Turkey in the Kaspi newspaper. In addition, he wrote articles for newspapers and journals in Istanbul such as Sırat-ı Müstakim, Sebilürreşad, Hikmet and Ateş'. He also collaborated with newspapers such as Suruş, published in Persian for the Iranian population, and Le Jeune Turc, published in French. In 1912, after the death of Ahmet Mithat, the founder of the Tercüman-ı Hakikat newspaper, he briefly took over the leadership of this weekly publication. In the same year, he was arrested twice for his articles but was soon released.

Ahmet Ağaoğlu initially became a member of the Turkish Society, founded by Yusuf Akçura. Later, in 1911, he became one of the six founders of the Türk Ocağı society. The aim of the society was to open a boarding school for Turkish children and to increase the intellectual level among Turks by publishing a newspaper. In September 1911, the society began publishing a journal called Türk Yurdu.He started writing articles for the journal. As a result of the journal's propaganda, Turkism ideas began to spread within the society. In 1911, 190 students from the Military Medical School addressed a letter to Akçura requesting the creation of a new organization. Later, with the participation of student representatives from the school and intellectuals like Akçura and Ağaoğlu, the Turk Ocakı organization was founded. He was among the founding members of the organization. Türk Yurdu and Türk Ocağı organizations began to gain recognition throughout Turkey. While the Türk Ocakı organization had 3,000 members in 1914, by 1920, their number had exceeded 30,000. Both organizations played a significant role in the Turkish War of Independence.

Due to his political activities, Ahmet Ağaoğlu became a member of the Central Committee of the 'Union and Progress' party, consisting of 12 people, in 1912. In 1914, he was elected as a deputy to the Ottoman Parliament from the Afyonkarahisar region.

Although Ahmet Ağaoğlu held high positions in the Ottoman state, he never forgot his homeland. In 1915, he actively participated in the establishment and activities of the Committee for the Protection of the Rights of Turkish-Tatar Muslims in Russia, based in Istanbul. In the same year, he represented Azerbaijan at the conference held in Lausanne, where the national minorities of Russia were discussed. During World War I, he was one of the signatories of the petition addressed to U.S. President Woodrow Wilson for the protection of the rights of Muslims in Russia.

=== In the Azerbaijan Democratic Republic ===
On May 28, 1918, Azerbaijan declared the Declaration of Independence. To save the people from physical annihilation, the newly established government requested military support from the Ottoman state based on Article IV of the Batumi Treaty signed between the Azerbaijan Democratic Republic and the Ottoman Empire on June 4, 1918. Following this, the Caucasian Islamic Army was formed under the command of Nuru Pasha. Ağaoğlu was sent to Azerbaijan along with the Caucasian Islamic Army as Nuru Pasha's political advisor. After the army reached Ganja, disagreements arose between Nuru Pasha and the existing Azerbaijani government, leading to the June crisis. A debate emerged between those supporting the establishment of a national government and the annexationists who advocated for Azerbaijan's unification with the Ottoman Empire. Ağaoğlu, as an annexationist, supported Azerbaijan's unification with the Ottoman state. He viewed the representation of Azerbaijani and Anatolian Turks, who were geographically, culturally, linguistically, and ethnically so close, as separate states as a form of division. Despite such tense circumstances, during his time in Ganja, Ahmet Ağaoğlu founded a newspaper called Türk Sözü. However, the newspaper only published two issues due to the army's movement to liberate Baku.

On December 26, 1918, Ağaoğlu was elected as a member of the Parliament of the Azerbaijan Democratic Republic from the Zangezur district as a neutral representative. Thus, he became both a representative of Qarahi̇sar-i Sahi̇b in the Ottoman Empire's Meclis-i Mebusan and a representative of Zangezur in the Parliament of the Azerbaijan Democratic Republic. At the fifth session of the Parliament of the Azerbaijan Democratic Republic, held on December 26, 1918, Ahmet Ağaoğlu emphasized the importance of introducing independence to internal forces before seeking recognition from foreign states. Therefore, he called for the establishment of a government capable of eliminating both internal and external enemies. Additionally, he demanded that everyone of eligible age, regardless of social class, should serve in the military. Highlighting the absence of delegations sent abroad to seek international recognition for the country, he stressed the urgency of this matter, stating:

Honorable gentlemen! The previous speaker, my esteemed colleague, delivered a heartfelt and passionate speech about the government, with which I agree in content. However, there is a difference between him and me: his enthusiasm burns brightly, while mine has dimmed; he is young, I am old. He has the right to dream a little in the clouds, but I am obliged to look at the ground. The independence of Azerbaijan, proclaimed in the government’s declaration, is the supreme goal for all of us. Every Azerbaijani who understands their dignity and ideals must embrace and pursue this cause. However, for this ideal not to perish and to transition from mere words to action, the first essential factor is the government itself. We must not forget that our country is surrounded by immense dangers. A storm of dark nights looms, and we are tossed like a piece of wood in the midst of this tempest. It is the government that can save us from this. To accomplish this, I want a resolute government. Yet, this piece of wood is not composed solely of us, so we cannot act thoughtlessly. That piece of wood also includes 3 million Azerbaijanis, their honor, women, and children. By saving them, we fulfill a great duty. I fully support the statement of the prime minister regarding the responsibilities he has taken upon himself. However, the government must also have a program. That program must steer this piece of wood, providing direction without looking left or right, and resolutely row it toward the shores of salvation.But what can the government's steering wheel and oars consist of? One is the program it establishes for itself, and the other, as revealed in the declaration, is the recognition of our independence. Before securing foreign recognition, we must ensure the approval of our government domestically. Therefore, our government must be one that can eliminate both internal and external enemies. Unfortunately, the government has not yet demonstrated its will. Regretfully, I must state with sorrow that within the government, tasks have been entrusted to individuals who were not fit for them. Therefore, I deem it necessary to undertake decisive measures to reform the government internally. I wish for the most deserving and prudent individuals to be appointed to key positions. Only through such means can misuse of authority be eradicated, and the government can make its presence felt in all regions. Additionally, the Prime Minister emphasized the necessity of organizing an army. Without this, the government cannot assert itself to anyone. Thus, I find it essential that everyone, regardless of class, be conscripted. No leniency should be shown to anyone, whether high or low. All those evading conscription or hiding must be thoroughly pursued and conscripted into the army, with strict punishments meted out to them. Otherwise, if a farmer’s child is taken while others are spared, they have every right to object. This is the kind of resolve and determination I expect from the government. Regarding foreign relations, once again, I must lament past shortcomings. Until now, necessary foreign measures have not been taken. For instance, we should have sent representatives to negotiate with our neighbors, including Armenia. The Armenian-Muslim relations and the reconciliation of all South Caucasian nations are among our greatest challenges and should be our primary duty. This task cannot be achieved by having representatives from both sides alone. However, we should have already introduced our independence to Europe, showing them that Azerbaijan is not just a geographic term but represents a nation living on this land. Until now, Azerbaijan has not asserted its existence to Europe. Two primary duties lie ahead. My esteemed colleague before me, with a somewhat idealistic perspective, spoke of democracy in grand terms. Alas! I believe achieving such results for those who do not assert themselves is nearly impossible. Recognition is contingent upon influence and connections. Unfortunately, it is regrettable to admit that we have not yet gained influence in Europe through well-executed propaganda. Our path to Europe remains closed; we are unaware of what is happening there. Yet, our destiny is tied to events in Europe. We must know what is happening in Europe and adapt our policies accordingly. The lack of couriers maintaining connections with Europe is another regret I must express. It is impossible to conduct politics by sitting at desks for five years, isolated from external developments. My purpose in highlighting all these past mistakes is to ensure they are not repeated in the future. I hope the government demonstrates full determination and pressure in implementing its declaration. I trust him despite the neutrals.

On December 28, 1918, the composition of the delegation formed by the Azerbaijan Democratic Republic to participate in the Paris Peace Conference was approved. Ağaoğlu was included in the delegation headed by Alimardan Bey Topchubashov. On January 9, 1919, Ağaoğlu and other members of the delegation departed from Baku to Tiflis by a special train. At the train station, the delegation was seen off by members of parliament and socio-political representatives led by Fatali Khan Khoyski. During the event, speeches were delivered by Mahammad Amin Rasulzade and Ahmad Bey Pepinov, while Ağaoğlu spoke on behalf of the delegation. The delegation arrived in Tiflis on January 11, 1919, and reached Batumi on January 14, 1919. In Batumi, Ağaoğlu observed injustices against the Muslim population, the disarmament of Turkish troops, and the general situation, which he later described in his book Memories of Armistice and Exile. He noted that the British established an administrative body consisting of representatives from different nationalities to govern the city. Despite Muslims constituting 80% of the population, the body included only two Muslims, alongside two Greeks and two Armenians. This was a clear instance of British discrimination against Batumi's Muslim population. At the January 19, 1919, session of the Azerbaijan Democratic Republic Parliament, the Credential Commission confirmed the validity of Ahmet Ağaoğlu's documents and intended to put his full membership to a vote. However, by that time, Ağaoğlu had already renounced his membership. The delegation departed from Batumi and arrived in Istanbul on January 21, 1919. Upon reaching the Bosphorus, the ship carrying delegations from Azerbaijan, Georgia, and Armenia was not allowed to disembark for eight hours. Later, the delegation was transported ashore in small boats and taken in open-top trucks to the British Embassy in the Beyoğlu district. After being made to wait there for several hours, they were finally admitted late at night for document verification. However, they were instructed to return to the embassy the following day. On January 22, the Azerbaijani delegation held a meeting at Topchubashov's residence, where they addressed organizational matters and assigned roles to its members. Upon Ağaoğlu's arrival in Istanbul, Armenian newspapers such as La Renaissance and Le Stamboul, published in French, launched attacks against him. They accused him of Pan-Turkism, Pan-Islamism, and complicity in the deaths of Armenians. Moreover, during the propaganda campaign conducted by Armenians in Europe and America against Azerbaijan, it was either argued that a state called Azerbaijan did not exist or that Azerbaijan was aligned with defeated Turkey, which had fought against the Entente powers. These efforts sought to spread biased information about Azerbaijan and its leaders. Ağaoğlu did not remain silent in the face of these accusations. He published a strong rebuttal article in the French-language newspaper Kurie de Turki in Istanbul, countering all allegations. However, by that time, it was already too late. Ağaoğlu had been placed on a list of individuals to be arrested as a supporter of the Committee of Union and Progress. He was portrayed as a leader of the Committee, a fiery advocate for its members in the Turkish Parliament and press, and an active opponent of the Allied Powers. All the actions and alleged wrongdoings of the Committee of Union and Progress, particularly those of the Talat-Enver cabinet, were attributed to Ağaoğlu. Subsequently, the British and French representatives occupying Istanbul announced that...

The Azerbaijani delegation should not take Ahmet bey Ağaoğlu with them. As a Turkish journalist and a member of the Turkish Parliament, he is an undesirable person who has consistently spoken and written against us.

Later, Topchubashov states in a letter to the Azerbaijani government that:

My statements regarding Ahmet bey's origin from Karabakh, his election as a member of the Azerbaijani Parliament, and his being considered an extremely necessary person for the Delegation could not dispel any doubts. The guarantee letter provided by General Thomson for Ahmet bey Ağaoğlu also played no role.

=== Malta exile ===
At the end of February, Ahmet Ağaoğlu contracted the Spanish flu, which delayed his arrest. For two weeks, he lay gravely ill with a fever of 40°C. During this time, İttihadists such as Ziya Gökalp and Huseyin Cahit were arrested. By mid-March, although his condition had improved, he was still bedridden. A few days later, two policemen arrived at his home, claiming they had information about a possible burglary and were there to protect the family. In reality, their purpose was to prevent Ağaoğlu from fully recovering and fleeing, and to arrest him. The next day, the officers arrested him. Despite a doctor's assessment that his imprisonment would be life-threatening and unsuitable for his condition, he was taken to the Eminonu Police Station. On March 19, 1919, he was transferred to Bekirağa division, a military prison where the Ottoman Empire held highly dangerous political prisoners. Shortly after their arrests, the Ottoman Minister of Education, Ali Kamal, eager to appease the British, ordered the dismissal of Ağaoğlu and Ziya Gökalp from their positions as lecturers at Istanbul University. This left Ağaoğlu's wife, Sitare Hanim, and their five children—the eldest only 17 years old—deprived of their sole stable income. While the Azerbaijani delegation was in Turkey, it provided financial assistance of 150 Turkish lira to Ağaoğlu's family, who were living in hardship. Additionally, during his imprisonment, friends such as Haydar Rifat bey and Ali bey Huseynzade offered constant moral support to his family.

Samet Ağaoğlu recalls a conversation between his mother and father as follows:

Once again, my mother and I were at Bekiragha. My mother said, "Ahmet, there’s a voice inside me. I’ve been thinking for days. These people are going to hand you over to the British!"

My father looked at his wife in surprise. "What do you mean, hand us over?"

My mother smiled. "They can’t do anything to you themselves. And they’re too scared to release you. That’s why they’ll hand you over to the British. It’s the easiest way for them."

My father’s angry voice still echoes in my ears: "You’ve lost your mind, Sitare. How can a state hand over its citizen to the enemy? What honor would that state have left? Being defeated is one thing, but dishonor is another! Get that idea out of your head. Whatever they’re going to do to us, they’ll do it here!"

My mother lowered her head. "You’ll see, Ahmet. But maybe, just maybe, it’s for the best."

Fifteen days after this event, on May 28, the British exiled Ahmed Bey along with other prominent Turkish figures to the island of Malta. Admiral Culthrop divided the 67 prisoners in the main group into three categories. The group consisting of 12 former government members, politicians, and public figures was classified as first-class. Ahmed Agaoglu and Ziya Gökalp were also part of this group, which included former grand viziers, ministers, and members of parliament, considered dangerous. They were all convicted of involvement with the Armenian genocide. The armored ship carrying the prisoners docked at the small island of Lemnos in the Aegean Sea on May 29. For reasons known only to the British, 12 prisoners, including Ahmed Bey, were disembarked there. They were placed in a detention camp where no prior preparations had been made for receiving prisoners. Those detained there were more commonly referred to by their numbers than their names. In all documents, Ahmed Agaoglu was recorded as prisoner number 2764. They were kept in an open area surrounded on all sides by barbed wire and guard towers. As there were no residential structures, they slept in large metal barrels. The members of the "first-class" group were only transferred to Malta after four months, in September 1919. During his exile, Agaoglu wrote articles criticizing the Ottoman government. In one of these writings, he stated:

Until now, history has not seen a state hand over its own children to its enemies with its own hands. The Ottoman state, like a cat, devours its own offspring. It is unprecedented in history for a state to deliver a cleric who has attained the rank of Sheikh-ul-Islam, its grand vizier, ministers, deputies, writers, and pashas to the hands of its enemies after imprisoning them for three or four months without trial! Such disgrace could only be committed by a wretched person like Sultan Mehmed VI!

Aghaoghlu, even in Malta, fearlessly, openly, and systematically confronted British officials with irrefutable arguments, not hesitating to criticize them. He repeatedly expressed his sharp objections to the British authorities' arbitrariness in written form. Asserting his right to freedom, he repeatedly sent letters to British officials with this demand. In one of these letters, he wrote:

I do not ask for mercy or pardon. I ask for justice. I accept in advance to be brought before a court and to abide by its decision. The British, with their global power, may crush many defenseless people like me. But what will this add to the glory of England? I do not say all this to beg for your mercy. No! I will never accept mercy or pardon. I seek justice!

Ahmet Ağaoğlu's right eye had been problematic since his youth, and due to not receiving proper treatment for a long time, he gradually lost his vision. While in exile, severe pain began in this eye. After some time, he started to notice that his left eye was also weakening. The doctor called in for treatment determined that the healthy eye was at risk and needed to be removed immediately, and for the operation, he requested fifty pounds sterling. This was an enormous sum for a prisoner who had no support. He turned to his colleague, Hüseyin Cahid Yalçın, who was considered one of the wealthier members of their group. After being exiled, Hüseyin Cahid had used his financial means to come to an agreement with the British, bringing his family to join him. He was also leading a relatively comfortable life in a villa, not much different from his former lifestyle in Istanbul, engaging in literary work and translating from Italian and English. Due to his different way of living, he did not seem to feel any remorse in front of his fellow prisoners. He even occasionally used the expression "He who pays the piper calls the tune!" Ahmet Ağaoğlu, finding himself in a desperate situation, approached Hüseyin Cahid, believing that as a colleague and an intellectual, his request would be met with sensitivity. As a former lawyer, he did not forget the conditions of the debt: "As soon as I get out of here, I will repay you at the first opportunity. If I die, my children will do so. If we both do not return, my children will pay your children the money." He tried to assure his colleague that he would not be at a loss. However, Hüseyin Cahid replied firmly without changing his demeanor, "No, Ahmet bey! In captivity, no one asks for or gives loans." Years later, in 1933, Hüseyin Cahid asked him for financial support to publish the Fikir Hareketleri journal. He who was also in financial need, sold the carpets from his home to provide financial aid to his former friend.

Ahmet Ağaoğlu was saved from a dire situation by Mehmet Esat Işık, an eye doctor with whom he had spent his youth in Paris, and one of the founders of the National Committee who opposed the Mudros Armistice, also exiled to Malta. Mehmet Esat had agreed to perform surgery if necessary medicines and medical tools were available. The British had obtained a paper from both the doctor and the patient, stating that they would not be responsible for the outcome of the operation. Mehmet Esat, who had established the first European-standard eye clinic in Istanbul, demonstrated true professionalism under difficult circumstances, saving him from the threat of blindness.

On April 6, the British High Commissioner in Istanbul, Sir H. Rumboldt, brought up the proposal to exchange 22 British war prisoners with the first group of 40 Maltese exiles. Six days later, official London agreed to the proposal. On April 13, instructions regarding the decision were sent to the governor of Malta. The plan was to bring the 37-member group (three had already been released and left the island individually) to an Italian port and free them there. Cami Bey, the representative of the Ankara government in Rome, also became involved in the discussions. Negotiations were initiated with the Italian Ministry of Foreign Affairs regarding where the exiles would be received. The British were reluctant to fulfill their obligation to return the Turkish prisoners, whom they had forcibly brought to Malta and held for nearly two years, back to Istanbul. Instead, they committed only to bringing them to the Italian shores. Many of those released had no resources to return to their homeland. They were able to leave the island only on April 30. The British warships Hibiscus and Chryssanthemum brought them to the port of Taranto on May 1. With the help of Cami Bey, the Ankara government's representative in Rome, Ahmet Ağaoğlu returned to Istanbul on May 28, 1921. At his home in Istanbul, he found a letter from Nariman Narimanov, the first chairman of the Soviet Azerbaijan People's Commissars. Narimanov invited him to Baku to take an important position in the council government he headed. In his response letter, written on June 5, 1921, he stated the following:

Dear and esteemed Mr. Narimanov,

I am very grateful and appreciative of the great respect you have shown to an old friend. However, three considerations prevent me from benefiting from this respect.

1. I do not agree the same ideological system that you represent. 2. I remain firm in my belief and conviction that the only hope for the salvation of the Turks lies within Ottoman Turkishness. 3. I consider it my moral duty to go to Ankara, which has freed me from captivity and restored my life and existence.

These three considerations prevent me from coming to my birthplace, Azerbaijan, and accepting the high position offered. I have no doubt that a person like you, who values clarity and truth above all else, will understand my position. Turkishness is an indivisible whole. The aim is to serve it. Wherever this service is rendered, it is sacred and blessed!

During his exile, Ahmet Ağaoğlu further improved his English, a language he had started learning 25 years earlier in Paris. At the same time, he was engaged in creative work. Due to strict censorship, he was cut off from journalistic activities. However, in return, he turned to philosophical research, and based on a comparative study of world religions and cultures, he completed his work Three Cultures during his exile. This work, which he later published in parts in the Türk Yurdu magazine after returning to Turkey, was significantly influenced by the environment in Malta.

=== Activities in Turkey ===
In Turkey, in order to promote the fight against the enemy, propaganda groups called Irshad were sent to various parts of Anatolia. Ahmet Ağaoğlu was offered to lead one of these groups, and he accepted the proposal. His group was to travel along the Çankırı-Kastamonu-İnebolu road, spreading propaganda among the population, and then continue on the Trabzon-Gümüşhane-Bayburt route to reach Kars. In Kars, a daily newspaper and a teachers' seminar were to be established. He was assigned to lead both the newspaper and the school. At the end of July 1921, he, along with two companions, left Ankara in a two-wheeled carriage and set off on their propaganda mission. Despite significant difficulties, over the course of four and a half months, they conducted active propaganda work in many cities and towns. At the end of 1921 and the beginning of 1922, Ağaoğlu accompanied Russian Ambassador S. Aralov from Batum to Ankara. Aralov wrote about this experience in his memoirs.

On October 29, 1921, while Ahmet Ağaoğlu was in Kars, he was appointed as the head of the Press and Information Directorate (Matbuat ve İstihbarat Umum Müdirliği) in Ankara. He was entrusted with leading almost all of the information policy of the Kemalist movement. In December 1921, he returned to Ankara and began leading the Anadolu Agency. Additionally, he served as the editor of the newspaper Hakimiyet-i Milliye. He wrote regularly for the newspaper, and later compiled these articles into a book titled İhtilal mi, inkilap mı (Is It a Revolution or a Reformation).

On July 22, 1923, he was elected as a member of the Grand National Assembly of Turkey (TBMM) from Kars with 158 votes. He began his parliamentary work on August 11, 1923. During his time in the TBMM, he was a member of several important parliamentary commissions, including those on International Relations and Constitutional Reforms. As a member of the Constitutional Commission, he played a significant role in the preparation and adoption of the new Turkish constitution in 1924. On August 2, 1927, he was elected as a member of the TBMM for a second time from Kars.

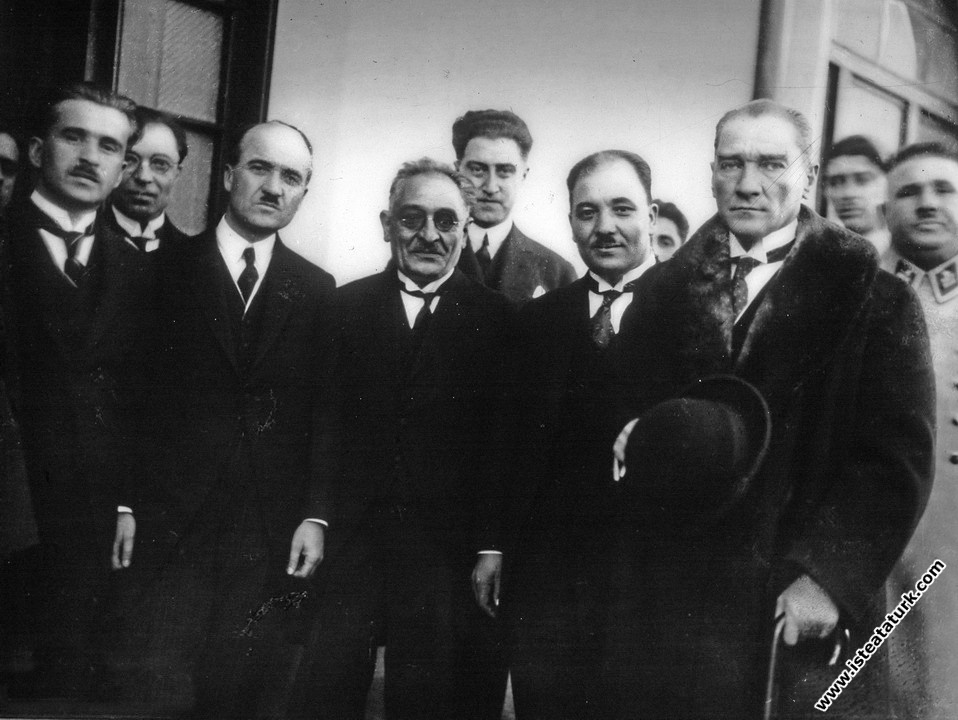
The inauguration of the new building of the Hakimiyet-i Milliye newspaper in Ankara, 1926. From right: Mustafa Kemal Atatürk, Mahmut Soydan, Ahmet Ağaoğlu, Yakub Kadri and Ziya Gevher Etili

On December 29, 1922, Ahmet Ağaoğlu, along with his colleagues, succeeded in restoring the activities of the Turkish Hearths (Türk Ocaqları) society, of which he was one of the founders. Starting from March 1923, the society's publication, the Türk Yurdu journal, resumed its operations. In 1924, during the first post-war congress of the Turkish Hearths, he was elected as a member of the organization's Central Committee.

In 1925, he began teaching at the Ankara Higher Law School, which he had helped establish. It is said that after the ceremonial opening of the school, where speeches were delivered by Atatürk and Mahmud Asad Bozkurt, who was the Minister of Justice at the time, he was entrusted with giving the first lecture. On February 13, 1926, members of the Turkish Grand National Assembly (TBMM) debated the issue of whether it was appropriate for Ahmet Ağaoğlu and Yusuf Kamal to receive salaries both as parliamentarians and as teachers. In response to the criticisms, Yusuf Kamal, along with him, declared that they were willing to teach future lawyers without any financial interest. His lectures from the 1925–1926 and 1926–1927 academic years were compiled and published in book form in Arabic script. However, with the country's switch to the Latin alphabet in 1928, the accessibility of these works to a larger audience was restricted. In 2012, these lectures were republished in the Latin alphabet. He continued to teach at the Ankara Higher Law School until 1930.

Alongside his activities in Turkey, Ahmet Ağaoğlu also helped his fellow countrymen. He provided financial support for the publication of the journal Yeni Kafkasya, which was printed by Mahammad Amin Rasulzade in Istanbul. This is confirmed by a coded letter he wrote on March 14, 1924, in which he mentioned sending 350 lira to Rasulzade for the journal's publication. Furthermore, when Mahammad Amin Rasulzade met with him in Istanbul, he asked for his help in finding work for Jeyhun Hajibeyli, who was considering moving from Paris to Istanbul.

Based on a letter he wrote on March 17, 1925, he successfully arranged for a monthly allowance of 75 lira for political émigrés, including Mahammad Amin Rasulzade, Khosrov bey Sultanov, and Abdulali bey Amircanov, through the Central Committee of the Turkish Hearths organization. Additionally, on his initiative, 130 branches of the Turkish Hearths across the country subscribed to Yeni Kafkasya, which helped rescue these Azerbaijani political émigrés from financial ruin. Due to these activities, he came under surveillance by Turkish intelligence agencies. In a report by military intelligence, there were concerns about the possibility that the 12,000 lira allocated by Atatürk for his trip to Izmir might be used to support émigrés of the Müsavat Party residing in the country. As a result, he tried to conceal his connections with Azerbaijani political émigrés and preferred to engage in covert correspondence.

As the new regime in Turkey strengthened, authoritarianism grew in the country's political, social, economic, and cultural spheres. However, he was unwilling to reconcile with this situation. In 1926, he sent a sharply critical report to Atatürk regarding the ruling Republican People's Party (Cumhuriyet Halk Fırkası). In this letter, he pointed to the decline in the party's reputation and the abuse of power by government officials, attributing these issues to the one-party rule in the country. He emphasized the necessity of transitioning to a multi-party system for the future development of democratic processes in the nation. Additionally, he opposed the practice of parliamentarians from the ruling party simultaneously holding leadership positions in various state-run companies. He wrote this report after being offered a position on the board of directors of the State Sugar Company. This marked another instance of his resistance to the concentration of power within the ruling elite, which he felt hindered both political accountability and economic development.

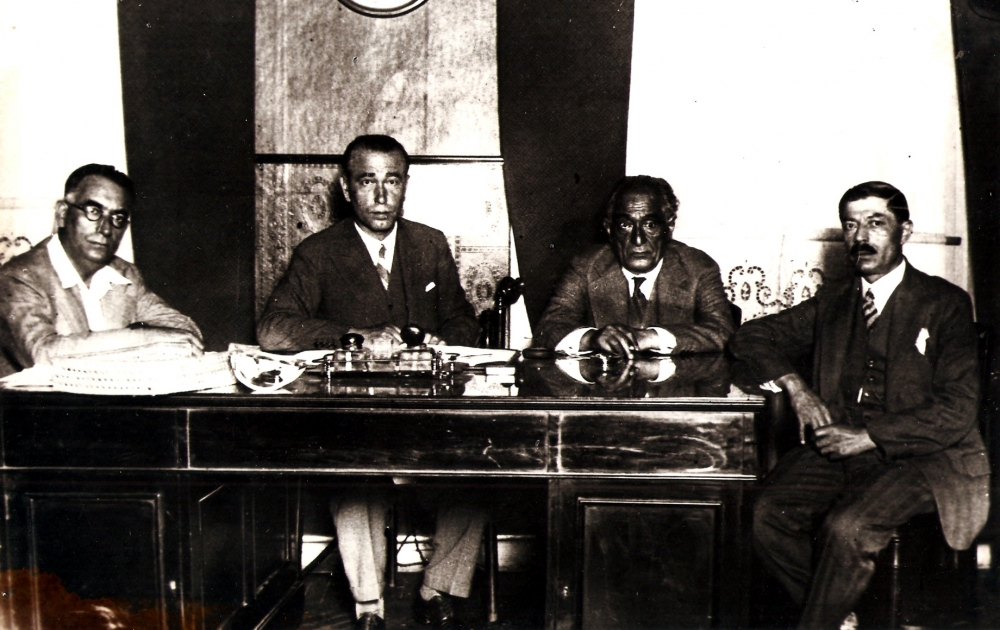
The founders of the Free Party (from left): Nuri Conker, Ali Fethi Okyar, Ahmet Ağaoğlu and Talat Sönmez

Atatürk, the founding leader of modern Turkey, aimed to organize and manage the country's open and covert opposition forces. He proposed to Fethi Okyar, Turkey's ambassador to Paris, to lead a newly created opposition party. This party, known as the Serbest Fırka (Free Party), was established with Atatürk's direct involvement. Ahmet Ağaoğlu, at Atatürk's request, joined the party alongside Atatürk's sister, Makbule Hanım. In August 1930, He authored and published the party's program and drafted its charter. The Free Party sought to provide a controlled platform for opposition and alternative ideas within the political system. However, the party faced challenges and ceased its activities after just 100 days, officially dissolving on November 17, 1930. After its dissolution, most members, including the party's leader Fethi Okyar, returned to the ruling Republican People's Party (Cumhuriyet Halk Fırkası). Fethi Okyar was later appointed as Turkey's ambassador to the United Kingdom in 1931. He was an exception. Prior to the party's dissolution, he had a personal meeting with Atatürk, during which he pledged that if the party were to disband, he would no longer engage in politics. Instead, he committed to focusing exclusively on educational and pedagogical endeavors. True to his word, he refrained from re-entering the political arena after the Free Party's closure.

Ahmet Ağaoğlu's alignment with the opposition was not forgiven by the government, leading to constant surveillance by authorities. In their home in Keçiören, plainclothes police officers were stationed outside the house 24 hours a day. They meticulously recorded the names of visitors and the license plates of their vehicles. According to Surayya Ağaoğlu's memoirs, during one cold winter day, he invited one of the policemen stationed outside into the house so he wouldn't suffer from the cold. From that moment on, the surveillance was conducted from inside the house. When the family later moved to Istanbul, his wife, Sitare Hanim, even suggested to the Minister of the Interior that the same policeman be sent to Istanbul to continue his duty, humorously highlighting the absurdity of the situation.

Ahmet Ağaoğlu decided to move from Ankara to Istanbul in 1932. After selling their house in Keçiören, he commissioned architect Sedat Çetintaş to build a new home in Istanbul. The house included a library and a circular room, a feature Ahmet Ağaoğlu specifically requested. Every Monday evening, he hosted intellectual gatherings in this circular room, engaging in discussions on social and cultural topics. After withdrawing from active politics, he dedicated himself to scholarly and historical research. He was the first to propose the idea that the Etruscans had Turkic roots, theorizing that they originated from the East and arrived in the Apennine Peninsula via Anatolia.

In 1933, he founded the newspaper Akın to promote liberal values in Turkish society. These values clashed with the country's prevailing one-party system, leading to government-backed press and state structures frequently targeting both him and his newspaper. The ongoing polemics occasionally led to lawsuits. In one of the court hearings, after receiving permission from the judge to speak, he delivered a remarkable statement.

With your permission, I would like to say a few words. It turns out that the person suing me was once my student. If I truly deserve to be punished, it should only be because, as a professor, I failed to properly teach my student the concepts of 'freedom of thought' and 'freedom of speech' as part of their constitutional rights.

The newspaper wins this trial. However, since the newspaper opposed the state's official propaganda, exposed the abuses of power, instances of bribery among the upper echelons of authority, and monopolies in various sectors of the economy, it was clear that it could not operate for long. Atatürk invites Ahmet Bey Ağaoğlu to a meal at the Dolmabahçe Palace. Later, he expresses his dissatisfaction with the critical articles published in the Akın newspaper. He then states that it is not possible for him to simultaneously be a professor at the state university and an editor at the newspaper, requesting him to cease the newspaper's publication. Ağaoğlu firmly responds that he will never voluntarily halt the publication of the newspaper. Atatürk, angered by this response, reminds him not to forget that he is a dependent. In reply, Ağaoğlu says to him:

This is not the first time I have heard these words addressed to me. However, by repeating these words tonight, you have driven a sword into the hearts of 60 million Turks.

After this incident, the Axın newspaper was shut down by the government in September 1933. In its final issue, published on September 24, the government-affiliated newspaper Hakimiyet-i Milliye was harshly criticized. Additionally, Ahmed Bey was stripped of his professorship under the guise of university reforms and was sent into retirement. For someone who was always active, this was a tragedy. In a letter to his friend Fethi Okyar regarding these events, he wrote:

I have been sent into retirement, and the doors to an active life have been closed to me. I am not writing this to complain to you but simply to unburden my heart by confiding in someone I sincerely love and trust. Complain? About what and why? You know me. I have reached the age of sixty-six. I examine my conscience and find nothing that would bring me shame... For me, the heaviest and most unbearable sorrow is being cast out of life and left bewildered, merely as an observer.

== Death and Burial ==
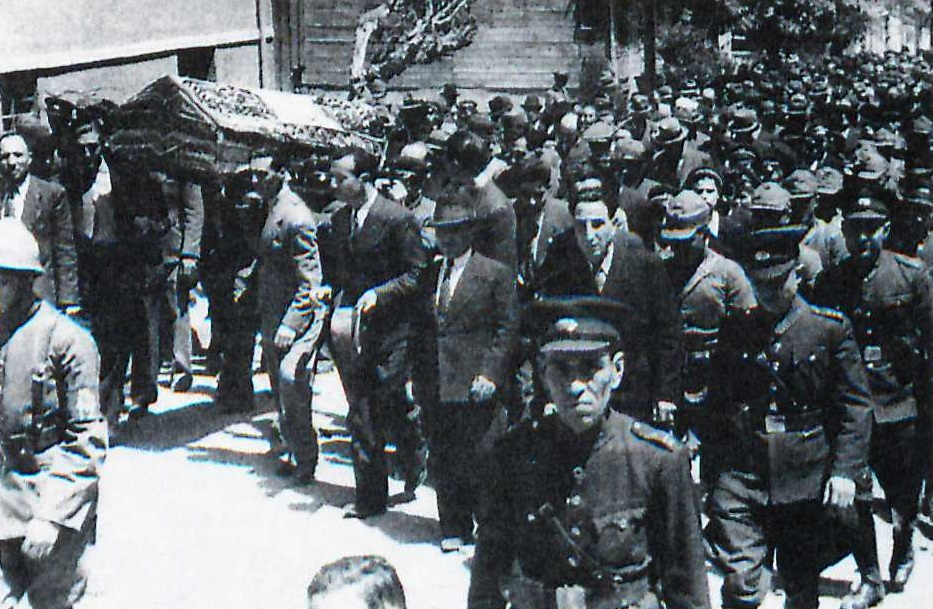
Photo taken at the funeral of Ahmet Ağaoğlu

In the last days of his life, when Ahmet Ağaoğlu was bedridden. He died on May 19, 1939, in Istanbul due to liver inflammation and heart failure. His funeral was brought from his house in Nişantaşı to the Teşvikiye Mosque. After the funeral prayer, he was buried next to his wife in the Feriköy cemetery. The farewell ceremony was attended by the governor, mayors, Lütfü Kırdar, Bolu MP Recep Peker, many MPs, representatives from the province, party and municipality, students and professors from universities, press workers, teachers and students from girls' schools, friends, and students he mentored. At his grave, Dr. Fethi Edib, Ismail Habib, and writer Peyami Safa delivered speeches, praising his contributions to science, Turkism, and the education of the younger generation. Wreaths were placed on his grave from various universities, Anadolu Agency, Galatasaray Sports Club, the press office, Ankara University's law faculty, and his friends. From May 19 to 22, 1939, all Turkish newspapers published reports, memories, and various details about the life of Ahmet Ağaoglu.

== Family ==
After returning to Shusha, Ahmet Ağaoğlu becomes a guest of Farrukh Bey Vezirov, with whom he studied in Petersburg. There, he meets Farrukh Bey's cousin, Sitare Hanim, a member of the famous Vazirov family, and falls in love with her. It is said that he goes against the customs of the time and proposes to her himself. This, however, displeases Sitare Hanim's mother, who refuses to give her daughter to him. Ahmet Bey and Sitare Hanim are able to marry only in 1902, after her mother's death. Their first child, Sürayya Ağaoglu, is born in Shusha in 1903. In 1909, the family moves to Istanbul to escape political persecution, and their hard times begin. After their baby son, Bashir, dies, and in 1918, when he arrives in Azerbaijan as an advisor to Nuru Pasha, their newly built house in Istanbul is burned down. After returning from Baku, he is arrested and exiled to Malta. Sitare Hanim remains alone with the large family in a foreign land. Despite the difficulties, Sitare Hanim does not let himy feel the hardships in the letters she sends him. To raise the children, she sells everything in the house, but does not inform him about the hardships.Sitare Hanim dies in 1933 at the age of 52. Ahmet Bey and Sitare Hanim had seven children. Vezir and Bashir died at a young age, while the remaining five children—Süreyya, Tezer (Tezekhanim), Abdurrahman, Samet, and Gultekin—received higher education and played significant roles in Turkey's social and political life.

Süreyya Ağaoglu was born in 1903 in Shusha. She was the first female student at the Faculty of Law at Istanbul University. After completing her education, she became the first female lawyer and legal expert in the East and the Turkish world. Süreyya Ağaoğlu actively participated in Turkey's political life and was one of the founders of the New Turkey Party, leading its Istanbul organization. She pioneered many firsts in Turkey's social and public life: she was a founder of the Turkish Women Lawyers Association, University Women's Association, Free Thought Dissemination Association, Soroptimist Istanbul Club, Turkish-American Universities Association, and Children's Friends Association, and led many of these associations. She represented Turkey at international events multiple times. She was a member of the International Lawyers Association (1952) and later became the second secretary of the Federation of Women Lawyers. In 1960, she was elected as the representative of the Women Lawyers Association at the UN Geneva Organization.

Ahmet Ağaoğlu's second daughter, Tezer Taşkıran, was born in 1907 in Baku. Although her real name was Tezekhanim, after moving to Turkey, she officially became known as Tezer. After completing her university education, Tezer worked as a philosophy teacher at both boys' and girls' high schools in Ankara. She became the first female teacher to teach at a boys' school. Later, she served as the principal of both the Ankara Girls' High School and Istanbul Girls' Teacher Training School. In 1944, she was elected as a member of the Turkish Grand National Assembly from Kastamonu, and in 1946 and 1950, she was elected from Kars. She is the author of hundreds of articles and 12 books.

Ahmet Ağaoğlu's eldest son, Abdurrahman Agaoglu, received higher engineering education in France and is recognized as one of the pioneers of modern electrical networks in Turkey.

Samet Ağaoğlu, the youngest son of Ahmet Ağaoğlu, was born in Baku in 1909. After completing his law degree in Ankara, he worked for a while in Strasbourg. Upon returning to Turkey, he served as a member of the Turkish Grand National Assembly from 1950 to 1960. After the Democratic Party's victory, he held significant positions in Prime Minister Adnan Menderes's government, including Deputy Prime Minister, Minister of Labor, and Minister of Industry.

Following the May 27, 1960 coup, Samet Ağaoğlu, like Menderes and other government members, was arrested and sentenced to life imprisonment. However, he was released in 1964 after receiving a general amnesty. In 1967, he visited his ancestral homeland, Azerbaijan. Upon his return, he wrote a book titled Soviet Russian Empire, based on his observations. He also authored several other books, including Strasbourg Memories, Freedom, Teacher Qafur, The Big Family, The Man in the Cell, The Death of the Donkey, Familiar Tracks, and My Friend Menderes.

His youngest child, Gultekin Agaoglu, became one of Turkey's renowned pediatricians.

== Hereditary ==
- In the cities of Baku, Shusha, Khojaly, Sheki, Ismailly, and Khankendi, one of the central streets is named after Ahmet Ağaoğlu.
- Parks named after Ahmet Ağaoğlu have been established in Baku city.
- The president of the Republic of Azerbaijan, Ilham Aliyev, signed a decree to celebrate the 150th anniversary of Ahmet Ağaoğlu.
- In 2018, many neglected graves of Azerbaijanis, including that of Ahmet Ağaoğlu, were restored in the Feriköy Cemetery. At the entrance of the cemetery, a monument was erected in memory of the founders of the Azerbaijan Democratic Republic on the 100th anniversary of its establishment. The monument features the official flags of Azerbaijan and Turkey and the phrase One nation, two states, along with the names of the founders of the Republic, including Ahmet Ağaoğlu.

== Liberal Kemalism ==
Liberal Kemalism is the combination of Kemalism, the founding ideology of the Republic of Turkey, and liberalism, which is based on freedom.

Liberal Kemalism emerged as a result of the liberal interpretation of Kemalist thought by Ahmet Ağaoğlu in the early years of the republic in Turkey. Ağaoğlu, on the one hand, defined himself as a Reformist and Kemalist, on the other hand he tried to develop an idea of Liberal Kemalism.

== Views ==
Ağaoğlu considered cultural and educational progress to be the major part for national liberation and viewed the emancipation of women as part of the struggle. Ağaoğlu was the first member of the Azeri national intelligentsia to raise his voice for the equal rights for women.

In his book Woman in the Islamic World, published in 1901, he claimed that "without women liberated, there can be no national progress".

== Publications ==
- Женщина по исламу и в исламе (Woman in the Islamic World; 1901, Tiflis)
- İslam, axund və hatifülqeyb (Islam, Akhund and Hatif al-Ghayb; 1902, Baku)
- Türk Teşkilat-ı Esasiyesi Şerhi (Commentary on the Turkish Constitution of 1924; 1925, Ankara)
- Hukuk-ı Esasiye Ders Notları (Lecture Notes of the Principles of Law; 1926-1927, Ankara)
- Üç Medeniyet (Three Civilizations; 1927, İstanbul)
- İngiltere ve Hindistan (England and India; 1929, İstanbul)
- Serbest İnsanlar Ülkesinde (In the Land of Free People; 1930, İstanbul)
- Hukuk Tarihi (History of Law; 1931-1932, İstanbul)
- Etrüsk medeniyeti ve bunların Roma medeniyeti üzerine tesiri (Etruscan Civilization and Their Influence on Roman Civilization; 1932, Ankara)
- Devlet ve Fert (State and Person; 1933, İstanbul)
- 1550 ile 1900 arasında İran (Iran between 1550 and 1900; 1934, Ankara)
- Ben Neyim (What's Me; 1939, İstanbul)
- İran ve İnkılabı (Iran and Its Revolution; 1941, Ankara)
- Gönülsüz Olmaz (Can't Be Unwillingly; 1941, Ankara)
- İhtilal mi, İnkılap mı (Is It a Revolution or a Reformation; 1942, Ankara)
- Serbest Fırka Hatıraları (Memories of the Free [Republican] Party; 1949, İstanbul)

== Literature ==
- Tadeusz Swietotochwksi: Russian Azerbaijan, 1905-1920. The Shaping of National Identity in a Muslim Community, New York 1985.
- François Georgeon: "Les débuts d'un intellectuel azerbaidjanais: Ahmed Ağaoğlu en France (1888-1894)", in Passé turco-tatar, présent soviétique: études offertes à Alexandre Bennigsen, Paris 1986.
- Audrey L. Altstadt: The Azerbaijani Turks. Power and Identity under Russian Rule, Stanford 1992.
- Adeeb Khalid: The Politics of Muslim Cultural Reform: Jadidism in Central Asia, Berkeley 1998.
- Charles Kurzman: Modernist Islam, 1840-1940. A Sourcebook, New York 2002.
- A. Holly Shissler: Between Two Empires: Ahmet Ağaoğlu and the New Turkey, London 2002.
- Ufuk Özcan. Ahmet Ağaoğlu ve Rol Değişikliği: Yüzyıl Dönümünde Batıcı Bir Aydın, İstanbul, 2010
- Ali Kalirad: Az jāmʻe-ye Īrānī tā mīhan-e Turkī: zendegīnāme-ye fekrī va siyāsī-ye Aḥmad Āqāyef (1869-1939) [in Persian], Tehran 2013.
- Ali Kalirad: "From Iranism to Pan-Turkism: A Less-known Page of Ahmet Ağaoğlu's Biography", Iran and the Caucasus, Volume 22, Issue 1 (2018), pp. 80–95.
