= Yaşar Karadağ =

Turkish educator and politician

Member of the Grand National Assembly
- In office 24 July 2018 – 3 June 2023
- Constituency: Iğdır (2018)

Personal details
- Born: 10 April 1976 (age 50) Aralık, Iğdır
- Party: Nationalist Movement Party
- Children: 3
- Education: Atatürk University

Yaşar Karadağ (born 10 April 1976) is a Turkish educator and politician of Azeri origin, who won a seat in the Turkish parliament in 2018 with the right-wing Nationalist Movement Party. Karadağ was voted into the top three best politicians from Eastern Anatolia. He lost his re-election bid.

== Education and career ==
Karadağ was born on 10 April 1976 in Iğdır, Turkey. He graduated from the department of Education at Atatürk University in 1997. He was a teacher for the Ministry of National Education and was a boardmember at a private school organisation in Iğdır. He is member of TURKPA.

== Personal life ==
He is married and has three children.
