= Tezer Taşkıran =

Turkish-Azerbaijani writer, politician and enlightener

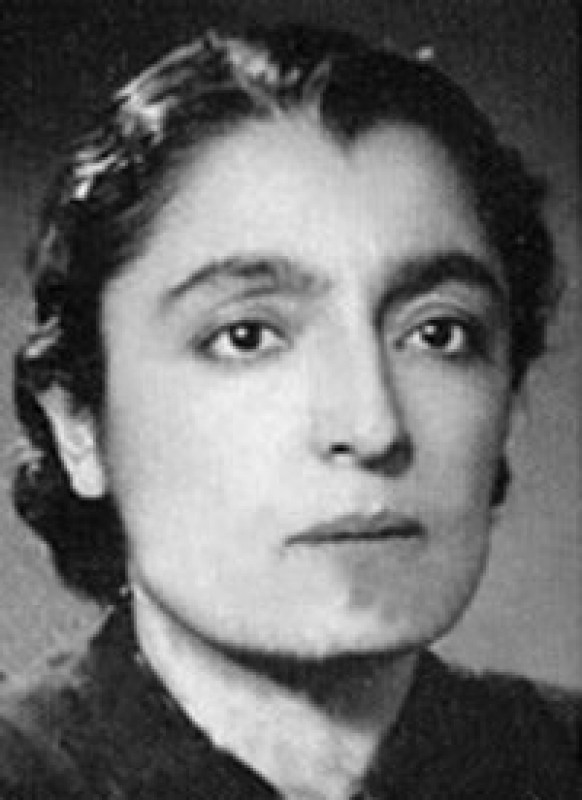

Member of the Grand National Assembly
- In office 8 March 1943 – 12 March 1954
- Constituency: Kastamonu (1943), Kars (1946, 1950)

Personal details
- Born: Tezekhanım Aghaoghlu; 1907 Shusha, Azerbaijan,
- Died: 4 May 1979 (aged 71–72) Istanbul
- Party: Republican People's Party (CHP)
- Spouse: Bekir Nimetullah Taşkıran
- Children: Suna Güler; Şevket Mete Taşkıran
- Parent: Ahmet Ağaoğlu (father)
- Relatives: Samet Ağaoğlu (brother), Süreyya Ağaoğlu (sister) Neriman Ağaoğlu (sister-in-law)
- Education: University of Istanbul
- Occupation: School teacher, politician

Tezer Taşkıran (Azerbaijani: Tezer Taşqıran, 1907 – 4 May 1979) was a Turkish–Azerbaijani writer, politician and teacher.

== Early life ==
She was born in 1907 in Shusha. Her father was Ahmet Ağaoğlu, a prominent Azerbaijani and later Turkish politician of the early 20th century, and her mother was Sitare khanım.

After the fall of the Azerbaijan Democratic Republic in 1920, the Ağaoğlus moved to Turkey where Tezer graduated from Faculty of Literature of Istanbul University in 1925.

She married surgeon Nimet Taşkıran in 1931 and traveled to Vienna; she returned to Turkey in 1933.

== Family ==
Her father Ahmet Ağaoğlu was a prominent Azerbaijani and naturalized Turkish politician, publicist and journalist. He was one of the founders of Pan-Turkism. Her sister Süreyya Ağaoğlu was a writer, jurist, and the first female lawyer in Turkish history. Her brother Samet Ağaoğlu was a poet and politician. Samet's wife, Neriman Ağaoğlu was also a politician.

== Career ==
After graduating from university, she worked as a teacher and became the first woman to be appointed director of a boys' school in Turkey. She became one of the founding members of the Helpers Association founded in 1928. She was the president of the Turkish University Women Association.

She was elected to the parliament from Kastamonu in 1943, and from Kars in 1946 and 1950.

== Works ==
- Logic, 1928
- Suri and Applied Logic, 1929
- Stuart Mill, 1931
- Principles of Turkish Ethics, 1934
- Dormitory Information, 1939
- The Citizen's Handbook, 1971
- Turkish Women's Rights on the 50th Anniversary of the Republic, 1973

== See also ==
- Abbas Ali Çetin
