= Samet Ağaoğlu =

Turkish–Azerbaijani writer and politician (1909–1982)

Minister of Trade
- In office 6 December 1954 – 8 February 1958
- Preceded by: Fethi Çelikbaş
- Succeeded by: İbrahim Sıtkı Yırcalı

Minister of Labor
- In office 11 November 1952 – 8 April 1953
- Preceded by: Nuri Özsarı
- Succeeded by: Hayrettin Erkmen

Deputy Prime Minister
- In office 5 June 1950 – 10 November 1952
- Preceded by: Nihat Erim
- Succeeded by: Fatin Rüştü Zorlu

Member of the Grand National Assembly
- In office 22 May 1950 – 27 May 1960
- Constituency: Manisa (1950, 1954, 1957)

Personal details
- Born: 1909 Baku, Russian Empire
- Died: 6 August 1982 (aged 72–73) Istanbul, Turkey
- Party: Democrat Party
- Relations: Süreyya Ağaoğlu (sister), Tezer Taşkıran (sister) Neriman Ağaoğlu (spouse)
- Parent: Ahmet Ağaoğlu (father)
- Education: Ankara University

Samet Ağaoğlu (1909 – 6 August 1982) was a Turkish–Azerbaijani writer and politician. He was the son of the famous Azerbaijani and naturalized Turkish politician, publicist and journalist Ahmet Agaoğlu.

== Early life ==
He was born in 1909 in Baku. His father was Ahmet Ağaoğlu, his mother was Sitare Hanım. The family was originally from Shusha.

After the fall of the Azerbaijan Democratic Republic in 1920, the Ağaoğlu family moved to Turkey.

Samet graduated from Ankara University, Law School in 1931. He later went to Strasbourg for his PhD, but returned because his father's financial situation was not well.

== Political career ==
He joined the Democratic Party when he began practicing law. He won the 1950, 1954 and 1957 elections and was elected to parliament from Manisa. He was a member of the IX, X, and XI Parliament of Turkey. Furthermore, he served as Deputy Prime Minister from 1950 to 1952, Minister of Labor from 1952 to 1953, and Minister of Commerce from 1954 to 1958. He was arrested during a military coup on May 27, 1960 and sentenced to life imprisonment. He was pardoned in 1964 while imprisoned in Yassiada. After that, he was not directly involved in politics.

== Literary career ==
Samet Ağaoğlu, who started writing in high school, published a magazine called "Hep Gençlik" with friends such as Behçet Kemal Çağlar and Ahmet Muhip Dıranas between 1929-1931.

He appeared with his first stories about his life in Strasbourg. Because of his political work, he published his books at long intervals, but he did not break with the literature until the end of his life. Samet Ağaoğlu, who also wrote many articles with political content, published his stories and essays in important magazines of the period such as Varlık, Yücel, and Çığır. He also used the signature of Samet Agayef in his writings.

He came to his homeland Azerbaijan in 1967 and dedicated a chapter of the book "Soviet Russian Empire" to Azerbaijan.

He died on 6 August 1982 in Istanbul.

=== Works ===
Stories:

- 1944 Strassburg Hatıraları
- 1950 Zürriyet
- 1953 Öğretmen Gafur
- 1957 Büyük Aile
- 1964 Hücredeki Adam
- 1965 Katırın Ölümü

Memories:

- 1940 Babamdan Hatıralar
- 1958 Babamın Arkadaşları
- 1965 Aşina Yüzler
- 1967 Arkadaşım Menderes
- 1972 Marmara'da Bir Ada
- 1973 Demokrat Parti'nin Doğuş ve Yıkılış Sebepleri-Bir Soru
- 1978 İlk Köşe
- 1992 Siyasi Günlük:Demokrat Partinin Kuruluşu

Review:

- 1944 Kuvayı Milliye Ruhu
- 1947 İki Parti Arasındaki Siyasi Farklar

Travel:

- 1967 Sovyet Rusya İmparatorluğu

== Family ==
His father Ahmet Agaoğlu was a prominent Azerbaijani and naturalized Turkish politician, publicist and journalist. He was one of the founders of Pan-Turkism. His sister Süreyya Ağaoğlu was a writer, jurist, and the first female lawyer in Turkish history. His sister Tezer Taşkıran was a writer, politician and teacher. She was one of Turkey's first women member of parliament. His wife Neriman Ağaoğlu was a politician too.
