= Hatif =

Arabic folklore

Hatif (Arabic: هَاتِف, lit. 'calling, shouting') is a voice that can be heard without one discovering the body that made it.

Al-Jahiz wrote that the Bedouin believed that important messages could be transmitted without a visible medium. The receiver would hear the message in realtime without seeing the speaker. Al-Masudi focused on the psychological backgrounds of this phenomenon, and explained the hatif as a hallucination caused by loneliness. However, according to al-Jahiz, belief in hatif was so widespread among the Bedouin, they were perplexed if people doubted their existence.

Such hatif was also attributed to jinn by pre-Islamic Arabs. This way, they talk to humans or avenge murder on a fellow jinn by driving the murderer insane.

Hatif doesn't necessarily come from humans or jinn, but also from ghosts, dwelling near graves to remind humans of their mortality or announce their death.

In modern Arabic, the term hatif is also used for a telephone, due to invisible communication.

== See also ==
- List of ghosts in Middle East folklore
