= Abbas Ali Çetin =

Turkish politician (1914–1975)

Member of the Grand National Assembly
- In office 22 May 1950 – 12 March 1954
- Constituency: Kars (1950)
- In office 22 October 1965 – 12 October 1969
- Constituency: Kars (1965)

Personal details
- Born: 1914 Yerevan, Elisabethpol Governorate, Russian Empire
- Died: 26 August 1975 (aged 67–68) Turkey
- Party: Republican People's Party; Democrat Party; Justice Party
- Children: 4
- Education: University of Ankara
- Occupation: Lawyer, Judge and Politician

Abbas Ali Çetin (Azerbaijani: Abbas Əli Çətin; Turkish: Abbas Ali Çetin; 1914– 26 August 1975) was a Turkish-Azerbaijani politician, lawyer and judge.

== Life ==
He was born in 1907 in Yerevan. His father was Abdulali, his mother was Gozal Hanım. During the First World War, after the Armenian attacks on Azerbaijanis in Yerevan, his family was forced to migrate to the Ottoman Empire. Abbas Ali Çetin graduated from Faculty of Law of Ankara University and worked in different state bodies as a lawyer and judge.

He was elected to the parliament from Kars in 1950 and 1965. He was a member of Republican People's Party, Democrat Party and Justice Party.

== Death ==
He died on 26 August 1975.

== See also ==
- Tezer Taşkıran
