= Süreyya Ağaoğlu =

Turkish-Azerbaijani writer, jurist, and the first female lawyer (1903-1989)

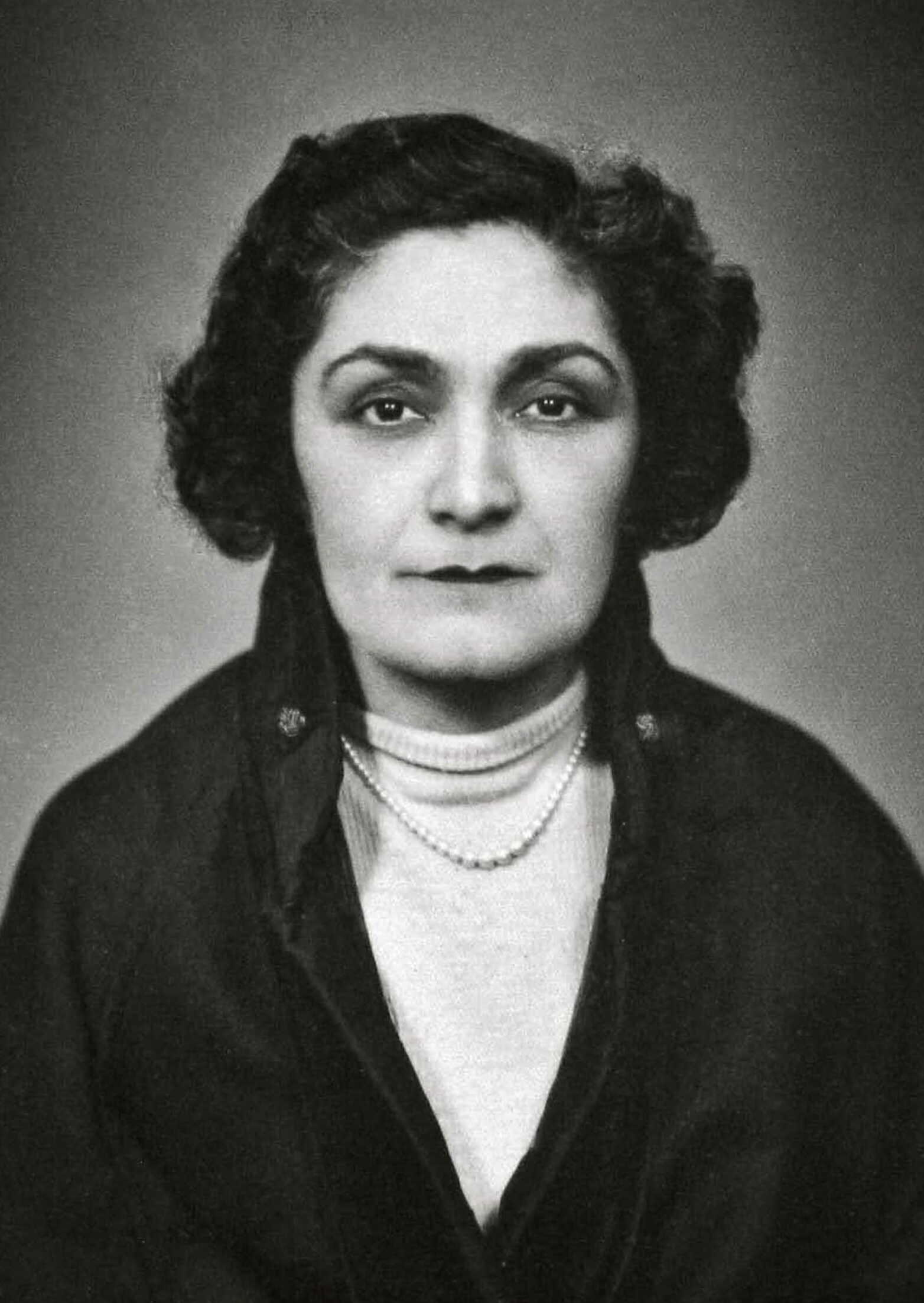
- Born: 1903
- Died: 29 December 1989 (aged 85–86)
- Occupation: writer, jurist, lawyer
- Notable works: What I Saw in London (Londra'da Gördüklerim) & One Life Has Passed Just Like This (Bir Hayat Böyle Geçti)
- Relatives: Ahmet Ağaoğlu - Father Samet Ağaoğlu - Brother

Süreyya Ağaoğlu (1903 – 29 December 1989) was a Turkish-Azerbaijani writer, jurist, and the first female lawyer in Turkish history.

== Early life and education ==
Ağaoğlu was the daughter of Ahmet Ağaoğlu, a prominent Azerbaijani and later Turkish politician of the early 20th century. After the fall of the Azerbaijan Democratic Republic in 1920, the Ağaoğlus moved to Turkey where Süreyya enrolled in the Faculty of Law at Istanbul University.

== Career ==
After graduation Ağaoğlu worked as a lawyer from 1927 to her death in 1989. In 1928, she took the free lawyer license and became Turkey's first female lawyer. For her initiative, Istanbul Bar Association was elected a member of the International Bar Association. From 1946 to 1960, she was the only female board member of this union. After the 1960 Turkish coup d'état she became his brother's lawyer. At that time, he entered politics as a member of the newly formed New Turkey Party and became the party's leader.

At one point she worked as an assistant to Professor Schwartz and Türkan Rado. She is the author of books What I Saw in London (Londra'da Gördüklerim) and One Life Has Passed Just Like This (Bir Hayat Böyle Geçti), where she discussed many legal issues and wrote biographical information about her father. She was one of the contributors to the women's magazine Kadın Gazetesi.

== Personal life ==
She married German lawyer Werner Taschenbreker in 1950 and divorced in the 1960s. They had no children.

== Family ==
Her father Ahmet Ağaoğlu was a prominent Azerbaijani and naturalized Turkish politician, publicist and journalist. He was one of the founders of Pan-Turkism. Her sister Tezer Taşkıran was a writer, politician and teacher. Her brother Samet Ağaoğlu was a poet and politician.

== Death ==
Süreyya Ağaoğlu died of a cerebral haemorrhage in 1989.
