= Kıznaz Türkeli =

Turkish politician

Member of the Grand National Assembly
- In office 7 June 2015 – 1 November 2015
- Constituency: Iğdır (June 2015)

Personal details
- Born: Iğdır, Turkey
- Party: Peoples' Democratic Party

Kıznaz Türkeli is a Turkish politician of Azerbaijani origin, who won a seat in the Turkish parliament in June 2015 with the Peoples' Democratic Party from electoral district of Iğdır.
