= Orfeon Chamber Choir =

Orfeon (Turkish: Orfeon Oda Korosu) is a chamber choir established in 1994 in Turkey. Its founders are amateur choristers from different professions, who had previously sung in various polyphonic choirs and participated in national/international festivals and competitions.

The Orfeon Chamber Choir aims to present performances of distinguished products of choir music from different periods and regions. Another goal is to promote polyphonic choir music in different regions of Turkey. The Choir also includes the works of Turkish composers in their international concert programs so as to familiarize audiences all over the world with Turkish choral music.

The multilingual repertoire of Orfeon Chamber Choir ranges from works of medieval times and the Renaissance, to those of Classical and Romantic periods as well as contemporary products, including compositions by the Turkish Five and the following generations of Turkish composers. The early period of European religious music, pre-romantic to romantic German choir music, modern French and Hungarian choir music, and the works of those Turkish composers who have made use of motifs from Turkish folk music make up the basic repertoire of Orfeon Chamber Choir.

Their first album appeared in 2002 and the second one titled '10' in celebration of their 10th anniversary was released in February 2005 by DMC.
