= List of ministers of justice of Turkey =

The following is a list of former ministers of justice of Turkey.

#	Minister	Term start	Term end	Party
Government of the Grand National Assembly (1920–1923)
1	Celalettin Arif	3 May 1920	30 March 1921	IP
2	Yusuf Kemal Tengirşenk	30 March 1921	19 May 1921	IP
3	Refik Şevket İnce	19 May 1921	9 July 1922	IP
4	Ahmet Rifat Çalık	12 July 1922	4 August 1923	IP
5	Mehmet Seyit Bey	14 August 1923	27 October 1923	IP
Cabinet of Turkey (1923–present)
1	Mehmet Seyit Bey	30 October 1923	6 March 1924	CHP
2	Mustafa Necati Uğural	6 March 1924	22 October 1924	CHP
3	Mahmut Esat Bozkurt	22 October 1924	27 September 1930	CHP
4	Yusuf Kemal Tengirşenk	27 September 1930	23 May 1933	CHP
5	Şükrü Saracoğlu	23 May 1933	11 November 1938	CHP
6	Hilmi Uran	11 November 1938	3 January 1939	CHP
7	Tevfik Fikret Sılay	3 January 1939	26 May 1939	CHP
8	Ali Fethi Okyar	26 May 1939	12 March 1940	CHP
9	Hasan Safyettin Menemencioğlu	12 March 1940	9 March 1943	CHP
10	Ali Rıza Türel	9 March 1943	6 April 1946	CHP
11	Mümtaz Ökmen	6 April 1946	10 September 1947	CHP
12	Şinasi Devrin	10 September 1947	10 June 1948	CHP
13	Fuat Sirmen	10 June 1948	13 January 1949	CHP
14	Ali Rıza Erten	13 January 1949	16 January 1949	CHP
15	Fuat Sirmen	16 January 1949	22 May 1950	CHP
16	Halil Özyörük	22 May 1950	9 March 1951	DP
17	Rüknettin Nasuhioğlu	9 March 1951	10 November 1952	DP
18	Osman Şevki Çiçekdağ	10 November 1952	9 December 1955	DP
19	Hüseyin Avni Göktürk	9 December 1952	25 November 1957	DP
20	Esat Budakoğlu	25 November 1957	3 April 1960	DP
21	Celal Yardımcı	3 April 1960	27 May 1960	DP
22	Abdullah Pulat Gözübüyük	30 May 1960	27 August 1960	M
23	Mustafa Amil Artus	27 August 1960	5 January 1961	M
24	Ekrem Tüzemen	5 January 1961	17 August 1961	M
25	Kemal Türkoğlu	17 August 1961	20 November 1961	M
26	Kemal Sahir Kurutluoğlu	20 November 1961	25 June 1962	CHP
27	Abdülhak Kemal Yörük	25 June 1962	25 December 1963	CKMP
28	Mehmet Sedat Çumralı	25 December 1962	15 December 1964	CHP
29	Sırrı Atalay	15 December 1964	20 February 1965	CHP
30	İrfan Baran	20 February 1965	31 July 1965	CKMP
31	İhsan Köknel	31 July 1965	27 October 1965	AP
32	Hasan Dinçer	27 October 1965	1 August 1969	AP
33	Hidayet Aydıner	1 August 1969	3 November 1969	AP
34	Yusuf Ziya Önder	3 November 1969	26 March 1971	AP
35	İsmail Hakkı Arar	26 March 1971	11 December 1971	CHP
36	Suat Bilge	11 December 1971	22 May 1972	IP
37	Hasan Fehmi Alpaslan	22 May 1972	15 April 1973	CHP
38	Mehmet Hayri Mumcuoğlu	15 April 1973	26 January 1974	CHP
39	Şevket Kazan	26 January 1974	17 November 1974	MSP
40	Mehmet Hayri Mumcuoğlu	17 November 1974	31 March 1975	CHP
41	İsmail Müftüoğlu	31 March 1975	11 April 1977	MSP
42	Zeyyat Baykara	11 April 1977	21 June 1977	IP
43	Selçuk Erverdi	21 June 1977	21 July 1977	CHP
44	Necmettin Cevheri	21 July 1977	5 January 1978	AP
45	Mehmet Can	5 January 1978	12 November 1979	CHP
46	Ömer Ucuzal	12 November 1979	12 September 1980	AP
47	Cevdet Menteş	12 September 1980	8 February 1983	M
48	Rıfat Bayazıt	8 February 1983	13 May 1983	M
49	Mustafa Kazım Akdoğan	21 May 1983	13 December 1983	M
50	Mehmet Necat Eldem	13 December 1983	17 October 1986	ANAP
51	Mahmut Oltan Sungurlu	17 October 1986	16 September 1987	ANAP
52	Halil Ertem	16 September 1987	21 December 1987	NP
53	Mahmut Oltan Sungurlu	21 December 1987	26 June 1988	ANAP
54	Mehmet Topaç	26 June 1988	30 March 1989	ANAP
55	Mahmut Oltan Sungurlu	30 March 1989	23 June 1991	ANAP
56	Şakir Şeker	23 June 1991	29 August 1991	ANAP
57	Suat Bilge	29 August 1991	20 November 1991	NP
58	Mehmet Seyfi Oktay	20 November 1991	27 July 1994	SHP
59	Mehmet Moğultay	27 July 1994	5 October 1995	SHP
60	Bekir Sami Daçe	5 October 1995	31 October 1995	DYP
61	Firuz Çilingiroğlu	31 October 1995	6 March 1996	NP
62	Mehmet Ağar	6 March 1996	28 June 1996	DYP
63	Şevket Kazan	28 June 1996	30 June 1997	RP
64	Mahmut Oltan Sungurlu	30 June 1997	4 August 1998	ANAP
65	Hasan Denizkurdu	4 August 1998	11 January 1999	ANAP
66	Selçuk Öztek	11 January 1999	28 May 1999	NP
67	Hikmet Sami Türk	28 May 1999	5 August 2002	DSP
68	Aysel Çelikel	5 August 2002	18 November 2002	NP
69	Cemil Çiçek	18 November 2002	8 May 2007	AKP
70	Fahri Kasırga	8 May 2007	29 August 2007	NP
71	Mehmet Ali Şahin	29 August 2007	1 May 2009	AKP
72	Sadullah Ergin	1 May 2009	8 March 2011	AKP
73	Ahmet Kahraman	8 March 2011	6 July 2011	NP
74	Sadullah Ergin	6 July 2011	25 December 2013	AKP
75	Bekir Bozdağ	25 December 2013	6 March 2015	AKP
76	Kenan İpek	7 March 2015	24 November 2015	NP
77	Bekir Bozdağ	24 November 2015	19 July 2017	AKP
78	Abdulhamit Gül	19 July 2017	28 January 2022	AKP
79	Bekir Bozdağ	28 January 2022	4 June 2023	AKP
80	Yılmaz Tunç	4 June 2023	11 February 2026	AKP
81	Akın Gürlek	11 February 2026	Incumbent	

Legend:

- AKP: Justice and Development Party
- ANAP: Motherland Party
- AP: Justice Party
- CHP: Republican People's Party
- CKMP: Republican Villagers Nation Party
- DP: Democrat Party
- DSP: Democratic Left Party
- DYP: True Path Party
- IP: Independent politician
- M: Military after coup d'état
- NP: Non-parisan (Civil servant)
- RP: Welfare Party
- SHP: Social Democratic Populist Party
