= Güvenç =

Güvenç may refer to:

== People with the given name ==
- Güvenç Kurtar (born 1950), Turkish football manager
- Guwanç Nurmuhammedow (born 1976), judoka from Turkmenistan

== People with the surname ==
- Bahar Güvenç (born 1997), Turkish footballer
- Celalettin Güvenç (born 1959), Turkish politician
- Cenk Güvenç (born 1991), Turkish footballer
- Emrullah Güvenç (born 1987), Turkish footballer
- Gizem Güvenç (born 2002), Turkish female swimmer
- Günay Güvenç (born 1991), Turkish footballer
- Serdal Güvenç (born 1984), Turkish footballer
- Sıtkı Güvenç (1961–2023), Turkish politician
- Tuğba Güvenç (born 1994), Turkish middle-distance runner
- Ziya Burhanettin Güvenç, professor of Physics at Çankaya University, Turkey

== Places ==
- Güvenç, Karaisalı, a village in Karaisalı district of Adana Province, Turkey
- Güvenç, Kazan, a village in Kazan district of Ankara Province, Turkey
