= Bekir Bozdağ =

Turkish politician (born 1965)

Bekir Bozdağ MP
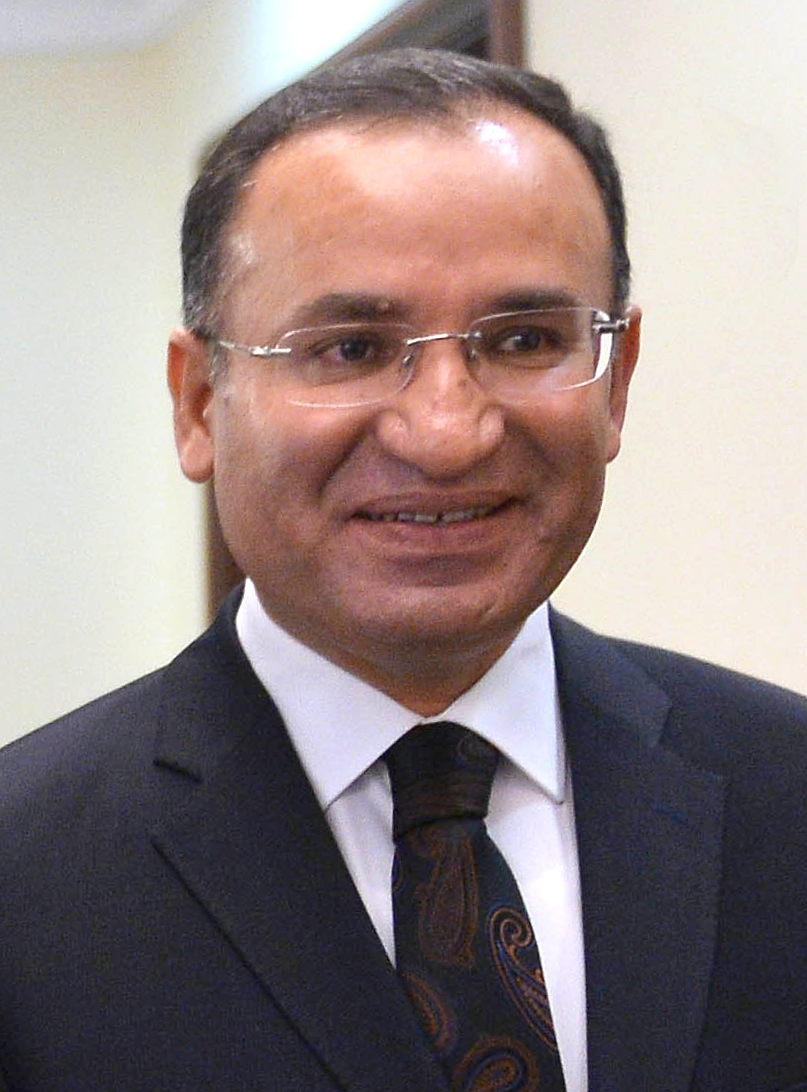

Deputy Speaker of the Grand National Assembly
- Incumbent
- Assumed office 14 June 2023
- Speaker: Numan Kurtulmuş
- Serving with: Gülizar Biçer Karaca; Celal Adan; Sırrı Süreyya Önder
- Preceded by: Süreyya Sadi Bilgiç

Minister of Justice
- In office 29 January 2022 – 4 June 2023
- President: Recep Tayyip Erdoğan
- Preceded by: Abdulhamit Gül
- Succeeded by: Yılmaz Tunç
- In office 24 November 2015 – 19 July 2017
- Prime Minister: Ahmet Davutoğlu; Binali Yıldırım
- Deputy: Bilal Uçar
- Preceded by: Kenan İpek
- Succeeded by: Abdulhamit Gül
- In office 26 December 2013 – 7 March 2015
- Prime Minister: Recep Tayyip Erdoğan; Ahmet Davutoğlu
- Deputy: Veysi Kaynak
- Preceded by: Sadullah Ergin
- Succeeded by: Kenan İpek

Deputy Prime Minister of Turkey
- In office 19 July 2017 – 9 July 2018
- Prime Minister: Binali Yıldırım
- Serving with: Recep Akdağ; Mehmet Şimşek; Hakan Çavuşoğlu; Fikri Işık
- Preceded by: Numan Kurtulmuş
- Succeeded by: Office abolished
- In office 6 July 2011 – 25 December 2013
- Prime Minister: Recep Tayyip Erdoğan
- Serving with: Bülent Arınç; Ali Babacan; Beşir Atalay
- Preceded by: Hayati Yazıcı
- Succeeded by: Emrullah İşler

President of the Supreme Board of Judges and Prosecutors
- Incumbent
- Assumed office 24 November 2015
- Preceded by: Kenan İpek
- In office 26 December 2013 – 7 March 2015
- Preceded by: Sadullah Ergin
- Succeeded by: Kenan İpek

Member of the Grand National Assembly
- Incumbent
- Assumed office 4 June 2023
- Constituency: Şanlıurfa (2023)
- In office 17 November 2015 – 29 January 2022
- Constituency: Yozgat (Nov 2015, 2018)
- In office 14 November 2002 – 23 April 2015
- Constituency: Yozgat (2002, 2007, 2011)

Personal details
- Born: 1 April 1965 (age 61) Akdağmadeni, Yozgat, Turkey
- Party: Justice and Development Party (AKP)
- Children: 3
- Education: Theology
- Alma mater: Uludağ University, Selçuk University
- Occupation: Politician, theologian, Lawyer

Bekir Bozdağ (born 1 April 1965) is a Turkish lawyer and politician of Kurdish origin of the Justice and Development Party (AKP). He served as Deputy Prime Minister from 2011 to 2013 and from 2017 to 2018. and as Minister of Justice on three occasions 2013-2015, 2015-2017 and 2022-2023. He was elected Deputy speaker of the Grand National Assembly of Turkey in June 2023 and resigned the post on October 2026, citing health problems; He remains member of parliament for Şanlıurfa.

His first two terms as Justice Minister covered the 17-25 December 2013 corruption investigation and for the second term, the state of emergency that followed the July 2016 coup attempt. Opposition figures and press freedom groups the judiciary's conduct and the protection of social media posts during that period. Bozdağ defended judicial independence and disputed some of the claims.

== Early life and education ==
He was born on 1 April 1965 in Akdağmadeni in Yozgat Province, Turkey. He studied Theology at Uludağ University in Bursa, where he also completed a master's degree in the history of religions, and then graduated from the law faculty of Selçuk University in Konya. He worked for a time in the public sector before practising as a lawyer.

In 2017 President Recep Tayyip Erdoğan said that, despite being from Yozgat, Bozdağ was of Kurdish origin.

== Political career ==
=== Early career ===
Bozdağ began his career in the Virtue Party. He stood as its candidate for Mayor of Akdağmadeni in 1999 and served as a deputy chair of its Yozgat provincial organisation from 1999 to 2001.

=== Parliament and first term as Deputy Prime Minister (2002–2013) ===
Bozdağ was elected to the Grand National assembly for Yozgat in the 2002, 2007 and 2011 elections. He sat on the Justice Committee and was appointed Deputy Prime Minister in the third Erdoğan cabinet on 6 July, 2011 serving until 25 December 2013.

=== Minister of Justice and Deputy Prime Minister (2013–2018) ===
Bozdağ became Minister of Justice on 26 December 2013, in the cabinet reshuffle that followed the corruption investigation of 17-25 December. He held the post until March 2015, and again From November 2015to July 2017, when he returned as Deputy Prime Minister in the cabinet of Binali Yıldırım. The Deputy Prime Minister's post was abolished in July 2018 when Turkey moved to a presidential system.

=== Constitution Committee and party roles (2018–2022) ===
He was reelected for Yozgat in 2018. Back in parliament he chaired the Constitution Committee and served as deputy chairman of the AKP.

=== Third term as Minister of Justice (2022–2023) ===
On 28 January 2022 president Erdoğan appointed him Minister of Justice for the third time, after Abdulhamit Gül resigned. The official gazette gave no reason for Gül's departure. Bianet reported that Gül's departure followed his public objection to the leaking of surveillance camera footage of Istanbul mayor Ekrem İmamoğlu, which pro government media had used to attack the Mayor, and that the objection was seen as implicitly aimed at Interion Minister Süleyman Soylu. Bozdağ left the post after the 2023 election and was succeeded by Yilmaz Tunc.

=== Deputy Speaker (2023–2026) ===
Bozdağ was elected for parliament for Şanlıurfa in the 2023 election and became a deputy speaker of the Grand National Assembly in June 2023. On 6 October 2026 he submitted his resignation to the speaker's office, citing health problems, while keeping his parliamentary seat. No official statement gave details on his condition. the AKP group chose a replacement on 7 October 2026 Erdoğan announced that Tokat MP Yusuf Beyazıt would take the vacated post.

== Personal life ==
He is married with three children.

Political offices
Preceded by Cemil Çiçek; Bülent Arınç; Ali Babacan	Deputy Prime Minister of Turkey; 6 July 2011 – 25 December 2013; With: Beşir Atalay; Ali Babacan; Bülent Arınç	Succeeded by Emrullah İşler; Bülent Arınç; Ali Babacan
Preceded by Sadullah Ergin	Minister of Justice; 26 December 2013 – 19 July 2017	Succeeded by Abdulhamit Gül
Preceded by Nurettin Canikli; Mehmet Şimşek; Numan Kurtulmuş; Tuğrul Türkeş; Veysi Kaynak	Deputy Prime Minister of Turkey; 19 July 2017 – 9 July 2018; With: Mehmet Şimşek; Fikri Işık; Recep Akdağ; Hakan Çavuşoğlu	Succeeded by Office abolished
Preceded by Abdulhamit Gül	Minister of Justice; 29 January 2022 – 4 June 2023	Succeeded by Yılmaz Tunç
