= T24 (newspaper) =

Turkish news website

- Bağımsız İnternet Gazetesi "Independent Internet Newspaper"
- Type: online newspaper
- Owner: Tempo24 Basın Yayın Prodüksiyon Ltd. Şti.
- Editor-in-chief: Doğan Akın (2009–)
- Founded: September 1, 2009; 17 years ago
- Political alignment: Neutrality (self-proclaimed), Liberal (commentators)
- Language: Turkish
- Headquarters: Istanbul
- Website: t24.com.tr

T24 is a Turkish online newspaper.

It sees itself as neutral, while commentators describe it as liberal-leaning.

== History ==
T24 was launched on 1 September 2009, initially staffed with former Tempo24 employees.

On 29 December 2012, T24 started their YouTube channel and uploaded their first video on 12 April 2013. In 2013, author and columnist Hasan Cemal joined T24. In September 2013, T24 announced "T24 Okur Fonu" their crowdfunding venture that planned to collect funds from its readers. In September 2013, led by Hasan Cemal, Doğan Akın, Yavuz Baydar, Yasemin Çongar, Andrew Finkel, Hazal Özvarış and Murat Sabuncu, T24 staff established Punto24, a self-proclaimed "independent press platform".

On 14 January 2015, T24 published an entire instalment of Charlie Hebdo, which included cartoons depicting the Prophet Muhammad, following the 2015 Charlie Hebdo shooting. In February 2015, T24 started their online literary criticism initiative Kitap Kültür Kritik 24 (K24). Between 30 October and 13 November 2015, Nazlı Ilıcak published her columns as a "guest columnist" at T24.

In March 2016, columnist and literary critic Murat Belge joined T24.

Following his departure from Doğan Media Group in September 2018, Mehmet Y. Yılmaz joined T24. On 19 October 2018, T24 announced the arrival of Yılmaz. On 23 October 2018, following the cancellation of her contract with CNN Türk, co-administrator Şirin Payzın joined T24. On 25 November 2018, a new periodical feature was introduced, "Şirin Payzın'la Ne Oluyor?", hosted by Şirin Payzın and first aired on T24's YouTube channel. On 17 December 2018, T24 publicised their weekly electronic outlook T24 Pazar, which was to be online-published every Sunday.

In 2020 chief editor Doğan Akın, one of the founders of the website, was prosecuted for "Support to a Terrorist Organization without having affiliation", as reporting the news based on tweets posted by Fuat Avni, an anonymous Twitter account, which caused number of detentions of alleged persons affiliated FETÖ (formerly referred as "Gülen Movement" until colloquially known 17-25 December Operations taken place). Akın was acquitted on 2 July 2020.

On 17 May 2020, T24 announced the arrival of senior journalist and politician and writer Altan Öymen.

On September 30, 2026, a court in Istanbul ordered the blocking of the website and its social media accounts for allegedly spreading "LGBTQ propaganda". Opposition leader Özgür Özel criticised the block as against freedom of information.

== Controversies ==
In June 2013, T24 columnist Alper Görmüş, who formerly worked at Nokta, Taraf and Yeni Aktüel, accused the Gezi Park protestors of being "pro-coup d'état" in his T24 column.

Chief editor Doğan Akın, a former Doğan Media Group employee before joining T24, was accused by Zekeriya Say in 2019, a columnist at Yeni Akit newspaper, of a conflict of interest due to his allegedly neutrality-periling relations with 3rd parties, alleged misuse of his connections in order to obtain funding for the newspaper.
