= Bilal Uçar =

Turkish politician (born 1969)

Bilal Uçar MP

Member of the Grand National Assembly
- In office 12 June 2011 – 1 November 2015
- Constituency: Denizli (2011, Jun 2015)

Deputy Minister of Justice
- Incumbent
- Assumed office 29 May 2016
- Minister: Bekir Bozdağ
- In office 7 January 2016 – 24 May 2016
- Minister: Bekir Bozdağ
- Preceded by: Veysi Kaynak

Personal details
- Born: 6 January 1969 (age 57) Acıpayam, Denizli, Turkey
- Party: Justice and Development Party (AKP)
- Children: 3
- Education: İstanbul University Faculty of Law

Bilal Uçar (born 6 January 1969) is a Turkish politician who has been Deputy Minister of Justice since January 2016. He served as a Member of Parliament for Denizli from Justice and Development Party (AKP) between 2011 and 2015.
