= Sadullah Ergin =

Turkish politician (born 1964)

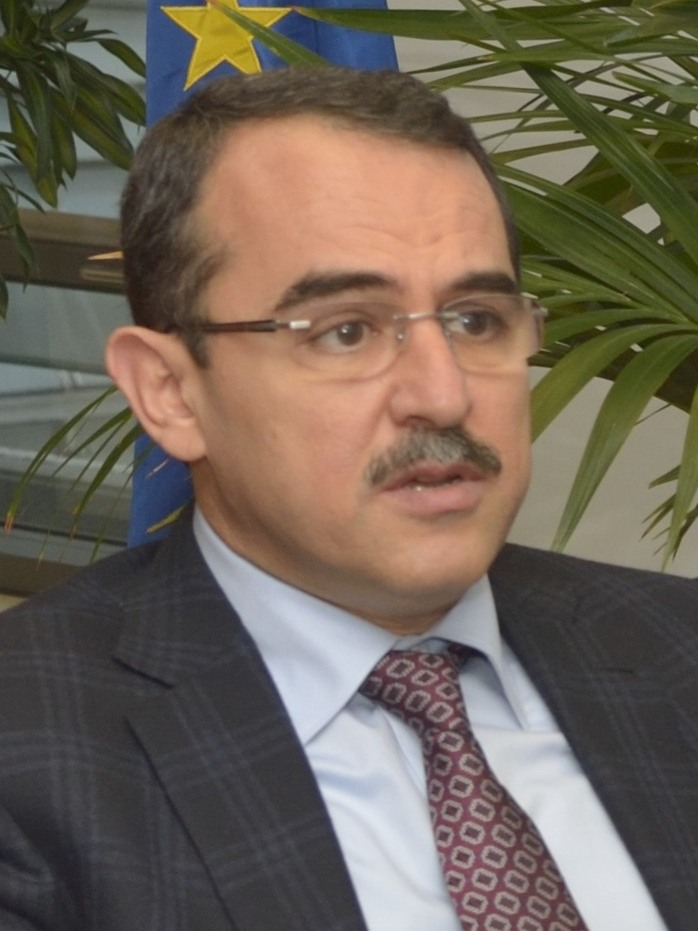

Member of the Grand National Assembly of Turkey
- Incumbent
- Assumed office 2 June 2023
- In office 14 November 2002 – 23 April 2015

Minister of Justice of Turkey
- In office 6 July 2011 – 25 December 2013
- Prime Minister: Recep Tayyip Erdoğan
- Preceded by: Ahmet Kahraman
- Succeeded by: Bekir Bozdağ
- In office 1 May 2009 – 8 March 2011
- Prime Minister: Recep Tayyip Erdoğan
- Preceded by: Mehmet Ali Şahin
- Succeeded by: Ahmet Kahraman

Personal details
- Born: 6 July 1964 (age 62) Antakya, Hatay, Turkey
- Party: Justice and Development Party (2001–2020); Democracy and Progress Party (2020–present); New Path (from 2025)

Sadullah Ergin (born 6 July 1964) is a Turkish politician.

Born to Mehmet İsmet Ergin and Hatice Ergin in Antakya. He completed his primary and secondary education there and then studied at the Uludağ University Economics and Social Sciences Faculty in Bursa for one year. He continued his studies at the Ankara University Faculty of Law, graduating in 1987. Following the completion of his military service, he served as a lawyer for the Regional Directorate for Foundations of Hatay for five years. He resigned in 1995 and began to work as a self-employed lawyer. He has been at the management position of several association and societies.

Ergin is a founding member of the ruling Justice and Development Party (AKP). Beginning 3 November 2002, he was member of the Turkish parliament for three terms from Hatay Province representing the Justice and Development Party. On 1 May 2009, Ergin became the Minister of Justice in the second cabinet of Erdoğan.

On 25 December 2013, amidst the 2013 corruption scandal in Turkey, Prime Minister Erdogan replaced him as Minister of Justice in a government reshuffle. The reason given for his departure was that he had decided to stand as a candidate in Hatay Province in the March 2014 local elections.

He was elected in the 2023 Turkish parliamentary election.

Ergin is one of the founding members of Ali Babacan's Democracy and Progress Party.

Ergin is married, has four children, and speaks English.

Political offices
Preceded by Mehmet Ali Şahin	Minister of Justice; 1 May 2009 – 25 December 2013	Succeeded by Bekir Bozdağ
