= Kenan İpek =

Minister of Justice
- In office 7 March 2015 – 17 November 2015
- Prime Minister: Ahmet Davutoğlu
- Deputy: Veysi Kaynak
- Preceded by: Bekir Bozdağ
- Succeeded by: Bekir Bozdağ

President of the Supreme Board of Judges and Prosecutors
- In office 7 March 2015 – 24 November 2015
- Preceded by: Bekir Bozdağ
- Succeeded by: Bekir Bozdağ

Undersecretary to the Ministry of Justice
- In office 1 January 2014 – 7 March 2015
- Minister: Bekir Bozdağ
- Preceded by: Birol Erdem

Personal details
- Born: Kenan İpek; 5 October 1959 (age 66) Rize, Turkey
- Party: Independent (de jure)
- Education: Law, Istanbul University
- Occupation: Prosecutor, Judge, Politician
- Cabinet: 62nd, 63rd
- Website: Government website

Kenan İpek (born 5 October 1959) is a Turkish legal prosecutor and judge who served as the Minister of Justice of Turkey from 7 March to 17 November 2015. Having previously served as the Undersecretary to the Justice Ministry, İpek succeeded the Justice and Development Party minister Bekir Bozdağ as the Minister of Justice in accordance to Article 114 of the Turkish Constitution three months before the June 2015 general election. He is, formally, of no political affiliation, and concurrently served as the President of the Supreme Board of Judges and Prosecutors during his time as Minister.

== Early life and career ==
Born in Rize in 1959, İpek graduated from the Istanbul University Faculty of Law in 1982. In 1983, he applied to join the judiciary in Istanbul and subsequently served in numerous roles as a Prosecutor. On 12 November 1997, he joined the Ministry of Justice, becoming the Prisons Manager on 6 October 2003 and as a senior advisor to the Ministry on 26 August 2008. He served in this position until 31 December 2013, becoming the Undersecretary to the Minister on 1 January 2014.

== Minister of Justice ==
With the Constitution requiring that the serving partisan Minister should vacate his position to his or her Undersecretary at least three months before a general election, İpek took over from Bekir Bozdağ as Minister of Justice on 7 March 2015 and is due to serve until a new government is formed after the election. As the Minister of Justice, İpek concurrently serves as the President of the Supreme Board of Judges and Prosecutors. The other ministers who replaced partisan ministers due to the constitutional requirement were Sebahattin Öztürk, who replaced Efkan Ala as the Minister of the Interior and Feridun Bilgin, replacing Lütfi Elvan as the Transport, Maritime and Communications Minister.

=== Judicial suspension controversy ===
In late April, the Supreme board of Judges and Prosecutors (HSYK), of which İpek serves as the President, suspended the judges who ordered the release of imprisoned Samanyolu TV broadcaster Hidayet Karaca and 70 other police officers. The individuals were being held due to alleged links with the anti-government Gülen movement led by exiled Fethullah Gülen, with Karaca being accused of establishing an armed terrorist organisation. In a statement, İpek claimed that the judges who ordered their release did so illegally from an illegal court and suspended them indefinitely while also accusing them of being followers of Fethullah Gülen. He further stated that attempts to destabilise the social order and the employment of illegal methods to do so would be curbed. President Recep Tayyip Erdoğan also openly supported their suspension, while opposition commentators accused the government of undermining the rule of law and the independence of the Judiciary.

In May, the HSYK expelled and suspended indefinitely four judges and a prosecutor involved in the investigation of the 2013 government corruption scandal.

== See also ==
- 62nd Government of Turkey
- 2013 corruption scandal in Turkey
- Supreme Board of Judges and Prosecutors
