= Mümtaz Ökmen =

Turkish lawyer, civil servant, and politician

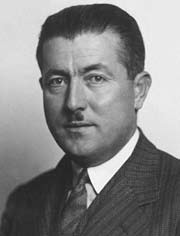

Minister of Commerce
- In office November 12, 1940 – July 9, 1942
- Prime Minister: Refik Saydam
- Preceded by: Nazmi Topçuoğlu
- Succeeded by: Behçet Uz

Minister of Justice
- In office April 6, 1946 – September 19, 1946
- Prime Minister: Recep Peker, Hasan Saka
- Preceded by: Ali Rıza Türel
- Succeeded by: Şinası Devrin

Deputy Prime Minister of Turkey
- In office September 19, 1946 – September 10, 1947
- Prime Minister: Hasan Saka
- Preceded by: (newly established)
- Succeeded by: Faik Ahmet Barutçu

Personal details
- Born: 1896
- Died: 1961 (aged 64–65)
- Party: Republican People's Party (CHP)
- Children: 2
- Education: Istanbul University

Mümtaz Ökmen (1895 – 28 May 1961) was a Turkish former lawyer, civil servant and politician.

== Biography ==
After graduating from the law school of Istanbul University, he served as court clerk, assisstan judge and attorney. He also served in Ziraat Bankası (Agricultural Bank of Turkey). Beginning on 8 February 1935, he served in the Turkish parliament for four terms up to 14 May 1950 (5, 6, 7th and 8th Parliament of Turkey) as a representative of the Republican People's Party (CHP). In the 12th government of Turkey (Saydam government) he was the Minister of Commerce between 26 November 1940- 9 July 1942. In the 14th government of Turkey (2nd Saracoğlu government), he was briefly the Minister of Justice from 6 April 1946 to 7 August. In the next government (Peker government), he continued as the Minister of Justice and was appointed as the newly established vice prime minister between 19 September 1946 and 10 September 1947.

He was married and father of two. His son Lacin Okten was a prominent businessman in automobile industry.

Political offices
Preceded by Nazmi Topçuoğlu	Minister of Commerce; 26 Nov 1940-9 July 1942	Succeeded by Behçet Uz
Preceded by Ali Rıza Türel	Minister of Justice; 6 April 1946-19 Sep. 1946	Succeeded by Şinası Devrin
Preceded by (Office established)	Vice Prime Minister of Turkey; 19 Sep. 1946 – 10 Sep. 1947	Succeeded by Faik Ahmet Barutçu
