= Veysi Kaynak =

Turkish politician (born 1962)

Veysi Kaynak MP
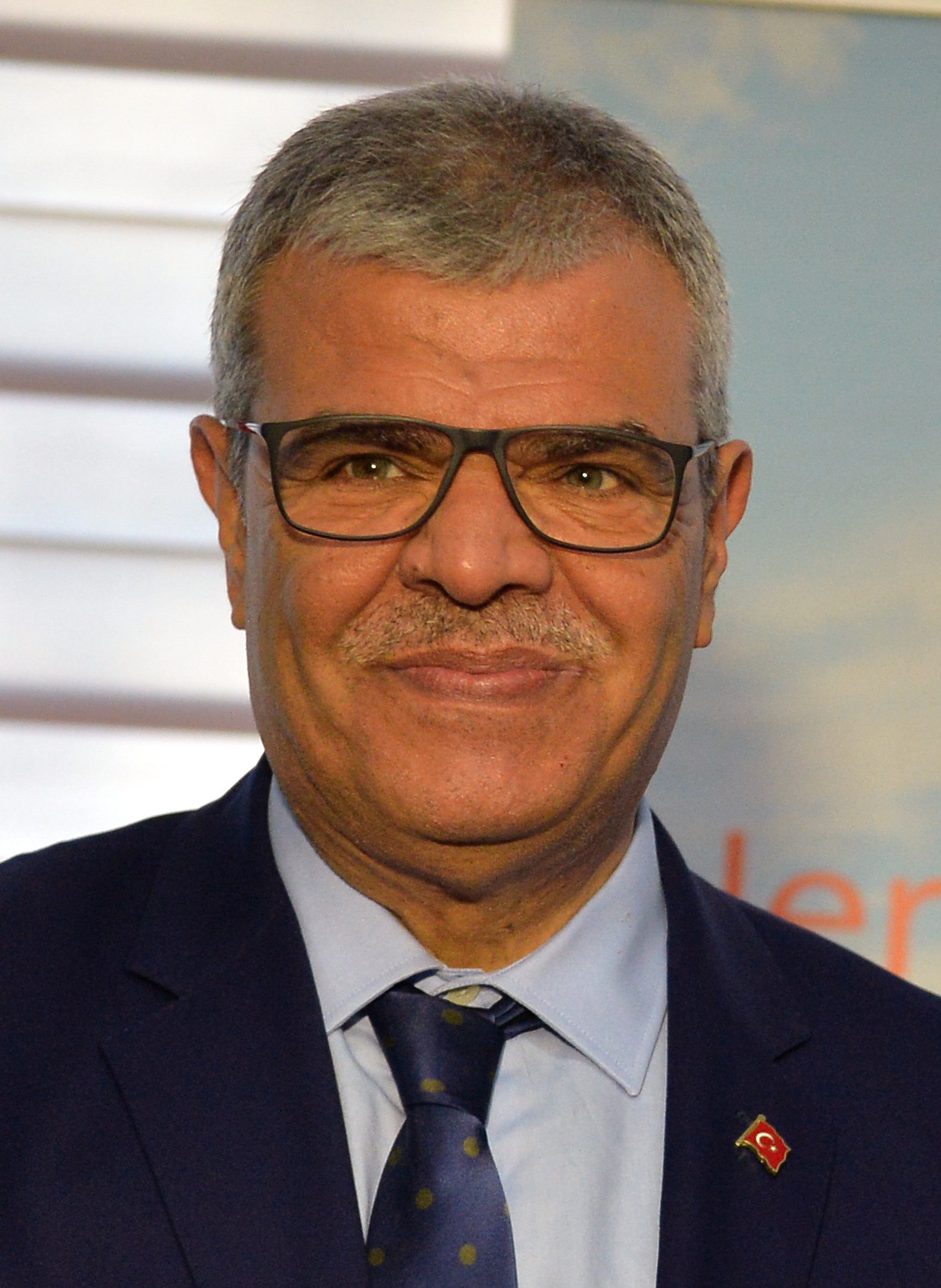

Deputy Prime Minister of Turkey
- In office 24 May 2016 – 19 July 2017
- Prime Minister: Binali Yıldırım
- Serving with: Nurettin Canikli; Mehmet Şimşek; Numan Kurtulmuş; Tuğrul Türkeş
- Preceded by: Lütfi Elvan
- Succeeded by: Fikri Işık

Member of the Grand National Assembly
- Incumbent
- Assumed office 7 June 2015
- Constituency: Kahramanmaraş (Jun 2015, Nov 2015)
- In office 22 July 2007 – 12 June 2011
- Constituency: Kahramanmaraş (2007)

Deputy Minister of Justice
- In office 7 November 2011 – 10 February 2015
- Preceded by: Position established
- Succeeded by: Bilal Uçar

Mayor of Kahramanmaraş
- In office January 1999 – April 1999
- Preceded by: Ali Sezal
- Succeeded by: Hanefi Mahçiçek

Personal details
- Born: 1 January 1962 (age 64) Kahramanmaraş, Turkey
- Party: Justice and Development Party (AKP) (2002-present); Welfare Party (RP) (1987-2002)
- Education: Istanbul University

Veysi Kaynak (born 1 January 1962) is a Turkish politician from the Justice and Development Party (AKP) who currently serves as a Deputy Prime Minister of Turkey in the government of Binali Yıldırım since 24 May 2016. He is a Member of Parliament Kahramanmaraş since the June 2015 general election, having previously served from 2007 to 2011.

Kaynak was active in local politics for numerous years before becoming an MP, serving as a municipal councillor, President of the Municipal Council, President of the Budgetary Commission and Deputy Mayor at the Municipality of Kahramanmaraş. He later served as the mayor of Kahramanmaraş briefly in 1999 before being elected as an MP in the 2007 general election. In 2011, he was appointed as the Deputy Minister of Justice and served until 2015. He is still a Deputy President of the International Anti-Corruption Academy (IACA).

== Early life and career ==
Veysi Kaynak was born on 1 January 1962 in Kahramanmaraş. He graduated from Kahramanmaraş Imam Hatip school in 1981 and graduated from Istanbul University Faculty of Law in 1985. He worked as a freelance lawyer following graduation and served as an executive board member in the private sector. In 1987, he became the Provincial Secretary of the Welfare Party Kahramanmaraş Branch.

== Early political career ==
=== Kahramanmaraş local politics ===
As a member of the Islamist Welfare Party, Kaynak served as a Kahramanmaraş Municipal Councillor between 1989 and 1999. During his two terms as councillor, to which he was first elected in the 1989 local elections and re-elected in the 1994 local elections, he also served as Deputy Mayor, Interim Mayor, President of the Municipal Council and President of the Budgetary Commission. From January to April 1999, he served as the mayor of Kahramanmaraş.

In 2001, he was the founding Deputy President of the Justice and Development Party in Kahramanmaraş and also the President of Political and Legal Affairs. From 2002 to 2007, he was the Provincial President of the AKP's Kahramanmaraş branch before resigning to contest a seat in the Grand National Assembly of Turkey in the forthcoming general election.

=== Parliamentary career ===
Kaynak was elected as a Member of Parliament for Kahramanmaraş in the 2007 general election. He was later made the President of a commission investigating the helicopter crash that killed the leader of the Great Union Party (BBP), Muhsin Yazıcıoğlu along with five others shortly before the 2009 local elections. He also served as the President of the Turkey-Bahrain Inter-parliamentary Friendship Group.

Kaynak became an MP for a second time in the June 2015 general election, again being elected from Kahramanmaraş. He was re-elected in the November 2015 snap general election, becoming a member of the Parliamentary Justice Commission and the Deputy Chairman of the Parliamentary Security and Intelligence Commission. Between his two non-consecutive terms as an MP, he served as the Deputy Minister of Justice from 2011 to 2015.

== Deputy Prime Minister ==
Following the announced resignation of Prime Minister Ahmet Davutoğlu on 5 May 2016 as the leader of the AKP, an Extraordinary Congress was held to elect his successor on 22 May 2016. Binali Yıldırım was the only candidate and was appointed Prime Minister of Turkey two days later on 24 May 2016, with Kaynak becoming one of the five Deputy Prime Ministers of Turkey along with Nurettin Canikli, Mehmet Şimşek, Numan Kurtulmuş and Tuğrul Türkeş in Yıldırım's government.

== Controversies ==
In 2010, Veysi Kaynak was caught committing ballot fraud by attempting to present marked ballot papers belonging to MPs not in the Parliamentary chamber during the voting procedures concerning International Agreements in Parliament. Having observed that the low number of AKP MPs present could endanger the vote, Kaynak hid large numbers of ballot papers in his bag and presented them during voting to guarantee the vote in the government's favour.

In 2010, Kaynak caused controversy after he submitted a proposed bill that would lift prison sentences from office-holders that had committed bribery and used their powers for personal gain.

== See also ==
- Pelican files
