= Yılmaz Tunç =

Turkish politician

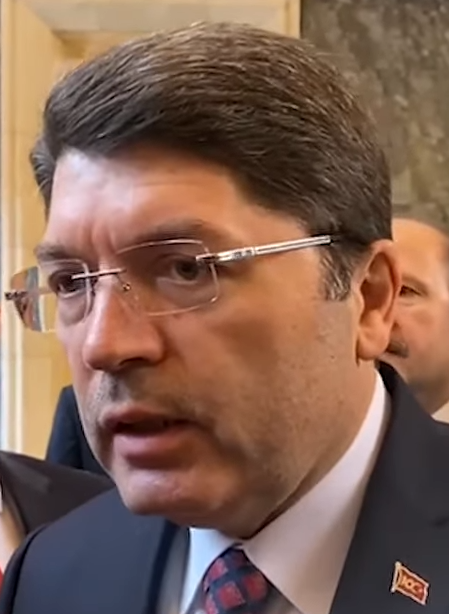
- Tunç in 2023

Minister of Justice
- In office 4 June 2023 – 11 February 2026
- President: Recep Tayyip Erdoğan
- Preceded by: Bekir Bozdağ
- Succeeded by: Akın Gürlek

Member of the Grand National Assembly of Turkey
- In office 23 July 2007 – 14 May 2023
- Constituency: Bartın (2007, 2011, June 2015, November 2015, 2018)

Personal details
- Born: Yılmaz Tunç; 1 February 1971 (age 55) Ulukaya, Ulus, Turkey
- Education: Istanbul University (LLB, LLM)

Yılmaz Tunç (born 1 February 1971) is a Turkish politician, and has been the Minister of Justice in the 67th cabinet of Turkey until 11 February 2026. He served in the Grand National Assembly of Turkey as a lawmaker in the past.

== Early life and education ==
Yılmaz Tunç was born in Ulukaya of the Ulus district in the province of Bartın. He attended primary school in the village and graduated from high school in Kastamonu. Following he studied law at the University of Istanbul from which he graduated in 1995. He then did his military service in western Turkey.

== Political career ==
Tunç became the vice-president Pendik branch of the Virtue Party in 1998 and a member of the municipal councilor of Pendik in 1999. In 2001 he became the founding chairman of the Pendik branch of the Justice and Development Party (AK Party). In the general elections of 2011, June 2015, the snap elections of November 2015 and 2018 he was elected to the Grand National Assembly of Turkey representing Bartin for the AK Party.

=== Minister of Justice ===
In June 2023, he was announced as Minister of Justice in the cabinet of Recep Tayyip Erdogan. As such he announced plans to introduce a cap on rent hikes of 25%.

In 2026, Tunç was succeeded by Akın Gürlek.

Political offices
Preceded by Bekir Bozdağ	Minister of Justice; 2023–2026	Succeeded by Akın Gürlek
