= Turhan Tayan =

Turkish politician

Minister of National Defense
- In office 28 June 1996 – 30 June 1997'
- President: Süleyman Demirel
- Preceded by: Necmettin Erbakan
- Succeeded by: Oltan Sungurlu

Minister of National Education
- In office 5 October 1995 – 28 June 1996
- President: Süleyman Demirel
- Preceded by: Nevzat Ayaz
- Succeeded by: Mehmet Sağlam

Personal details
- Born: 19 October 1943 (age 82) Bursa, Turkey

Turhan Tayan (born 19 October 1943) is a Turkish politician and lawyer.

After his graduation from the Istanbul University Faculty of Law, he was a freelance lawyer and journalist. Provincial Assembly and Provincial Council memberships, XIX. And XX. He was deputy of the Bursa Parliament.
