= Hasan Basri Güzeloğlu =

Turkish politician (born 1964)

Mayor of Kocaeli
- Incumbent
- Assumed office 1 October 2014
- Preceded by: Ercan Topaca

Mayor of Mersin
- In office 2 June 2010 – 27 September 2014
- Preceded by: Hüseyin Aksoy
- Succeeded by: Özdemir Çakacak

Mayor of Samsun
- In office 18 May 2006 – 2 June 2010
- Preceded by: Mustafa Demir
- Succeeded by: Hüseyin Aksoy

Mayor of Karaman
- In office 20 September 2004 – 13 May 2006
- Preceded by: İsmet Metin
- Succeeded by: Fatih Şahin

Mayor of Gümüşhane
- In office 1 February 2003 – 10 September 2004
- Preceded by: Gazi Şimşek
- Succeeded by: Veyrsel Dalmaz

Personal details
- Born: September 22, 1964 (age 61) Ankara, Turkey

Hasan Basri Güzeloğlu (born 22 September 1964) is a Turkish politician and the incumbent Governor of Kocaeli.

== Early life ==
Güzeloğlu was born on 22 September 1964 in Ankara, the capital of Republic of Turkey. He was educated at different schools of Turkey and attended Faculty of Political Science, Ankara University for higher education.
