= Fuat Avni =

Anonymous Twitter blogger and whistleblower

- Occupation: Microblogger
- Years active: 2014–2016
- Known for: Claims and predictions about Turkish politics on Twitter

Fuat Avni was an anonymous Twitter phenomenon, mostly known for tweets and leaks concerning the ruling Justice and Development Party in Turkey. The account tweeted its first tweet on in 2014, as sources differ about the exact date, some say 18 April while other claim 18 February, and its last tweet on 20 July 2016, shortly after the failed coup attempt of 15 July 2016. At its peak the account had been followed by as many as 3 million people, A March 2021 snapshot recorded 2.0 million followers on the account's the current handle.

== Credibility and reception ==
Fuat Avni became one of the most closely watched accounts in Turkish politics, with the account's tips frequently preceding real government raids and personnel changes. Greg Barton, an expert on Turkish politics at Monash University, told VICE News that Fuat Avni's consistent credibility has established him as a reliable source of information. The account's most explosive claim, made after the 15 July 2016 coup attempt, alleged that President Recep Tayyip Erdoğan had plotted terrorist style attacks on Turkish civilians to frame his opponents.

== Claims on its identity ==
As of May 2016, the identity of the account's operator or operators was unknown, though the Turkish government and various commentators speculated about several possibilities. Different people were accused of or claimed to be behind the account though none of these claims were proven at the time.

Turkish journalist and former police officer, Emre Uslu was one such figure reputedly named in press reports, President Erdoğan himself publicly challenged the account in February 2015, telling its operator "If you have the courage, don't use an alias," after a court had ordered Fuat Avni's Twitter and Facebook accounts blocked. Uslu rejected the claim that he was Fuat Avni.

== Legal action and arrests ==
Due to legal actions, the account name changed twice moving between @fuatavni, @fuatavnifuat and @fuatavni_f. In January 2015, Twitter complied with a Turkish court order, to block the account's tweets within the country, after a series of leaks, including tip-offs police raids on media outlets.

On 20 July 2016, computer engineer Akif Mustafa Koçyiğit was arrested in İstanbul along with other 9 engineers as part of the 2016 purges following the coup d'état attempt. They were charged with providing information to Fuat Avni. On 24 July, Muhammed Sait Kuloğlu and Yetkin Yıldız were also arrested.

== Trial and convictions ==
On 18 January 2021, the Ankara 22nd High Criminal Court sentenced Mustafa Koçyiğit, a former Prime Ministry official and Bülent Günay, a former intelligence official, to life imprisonment plus an additional 25 years each, after finding them guilty of "violating the constitutional order" and of "disclosing state secrets and spying" in connection with operating the Fuat Avni account. Seven further defendants received sentences ranging from 13-16 years and eight others received sentences of 7 to 10 years. Turkish authorities alleged the account had been set up by the Gülen movement, which the government refers to as the Fethullah Terrorist Organisation (FETÖ).

== Contents of its claims ==
It claimed to provide information from undisclosed government talks concerning the 2013 corruption scandal, irregularities during elections, secret operations with the government and Cemaat. The account generally referred to Recep Tayyip Erdoğan as "BB" (Turkish for PM), "Tiran" (tyrant), "Başçalan" (a pun on PM, meaning Prime Thief), "Yezid" (Yazid I, the second Umayyad Caliph, regarded by some scholars as a tyrant), "Faşist" (fascist) or Narsist (narcissist). They used Bediüzzaman's iconic "Korkma, titre" phrase ("Don't be afraid, shiver") occasionally.

=== Important claims ===
Some of their claims had been realized a few days or week later.

Claim date	Claims	Tweet	State
8 September 2015	Seizing of Kaynak Holding		On 18 November 2015 Kaynak Holding was seized.
28 August 2015	Seizing of İpek Holding and operations against Doğan Holding		On 27–28 October 2015 Koza İpek Holding was seized.
24 July 2015	Operations on education facilities claimed to have close ties with the Gülen movement		Occurred.
19 April 2016	Replacing Davutoğlu with Yıldırım as Prime Minister		On 5 May 2016, PM Davutoğlu announced his retirement as Prime Minister. Yıldırım became PM on 24 May 2016.
17 July 2016	2016 coup d'état is a self-coup planned by Erdoğan		The claim was made after the failed coup.

== Accounts ==
Due to legal actions, the account name has changed twice.

Date	Account
18 February 2014 – 5 August 2014 (active)	@fuatavni
5 August 2014 – 21 January 2015	@fuatavnifuat
21 January 2015–today (active)	@fuatavni_f

== See also ==
- Pelican files
- Government of Turkey
