= Mahmut Oltan Sungurlu =

Turkish politician

Minister of National Defense
- In office 6 March 1996 – 28 June 1996
- Prime Minister: Mesut Yılmaz
- Preceded by: Vefa Tanır
- Succeeded by: Turhan Tayan

Minister of Justice
- In office 30 June 1997 – 4 August 1998
- Prime Minister: Mesut Yılmaz
- Preceded by: Şevket Kazan
- Succeeded by: Hasan Denizkurdu

Minister of Justice
- In office 31 March 1989 – 24 June 1991
- Prime Minister: Yıldırım Akbulut
- Preceded by: Mehmet Topaç
- Succeeded by: Şakir Şeker

Minister of Justice
- In office 21 December 1987 – 26 June 1988
- Prime Minister: Turgut Özal
- Preceded by: Halil Ertem
- Succeeded by: Mehmet Topaç

Minister of Justice
- In office 17 October 1986 – 15 September 1987
- Prime Minister: Turgut Özal
- Preceded by: Necat Eldem
- Succeeded by: Halil Ertem

Member of the Grand National Assembly of Turkey
- In office 24 November 1983 – 25 March 1999
- Constituency: Gümüşhane (1983, 1987, 1991, 1995)

Personal details
- Born: 1936 (age 89–90) Gümüşhane, Turkey
- Party: Motherland Party (1983–1999)
- Education: Bursa Erkek Lisesi; Istanbul University Faculty of Law

Mahmut Oltan Sungurlu (or alternatively written as Oltan Sungurlu; born 1936, Gümüşhane), is a former Turkish politician. He served as the Minister of National Defense between March 1996 and June 1996.

== Early life ==
Sungurlu was born in 1936 in the Gümüşhane district in Gümüşhane Province, eastern Turkey. Sungurlu continued his secondary education in Bursa High School. He was educated in law at the Istanbul University.

== Professional career ==
After university, Oltan Sungurlu started to work as a lawyer in 1963. He established the Gümüşhane Motherland Party provincial organization in 1983 and was elected as a deputy of Gümüşhane. He served in the Court of Accounts and National Defense Budget Commissions in the Parliament. He became the Minister of Justice in October 1986. He was elected four times as a deputy of Gümüşhane in 1983, 1987, 1991 and 1995.

He served as the chairman of the Board of Trustees of Istanbul Şehir University, founded by the Science and Arts Foundation (BİSAV). He is married and has one child.
