= Hasan Cemal =

Turkish journalist columnist and writer (born 1944)

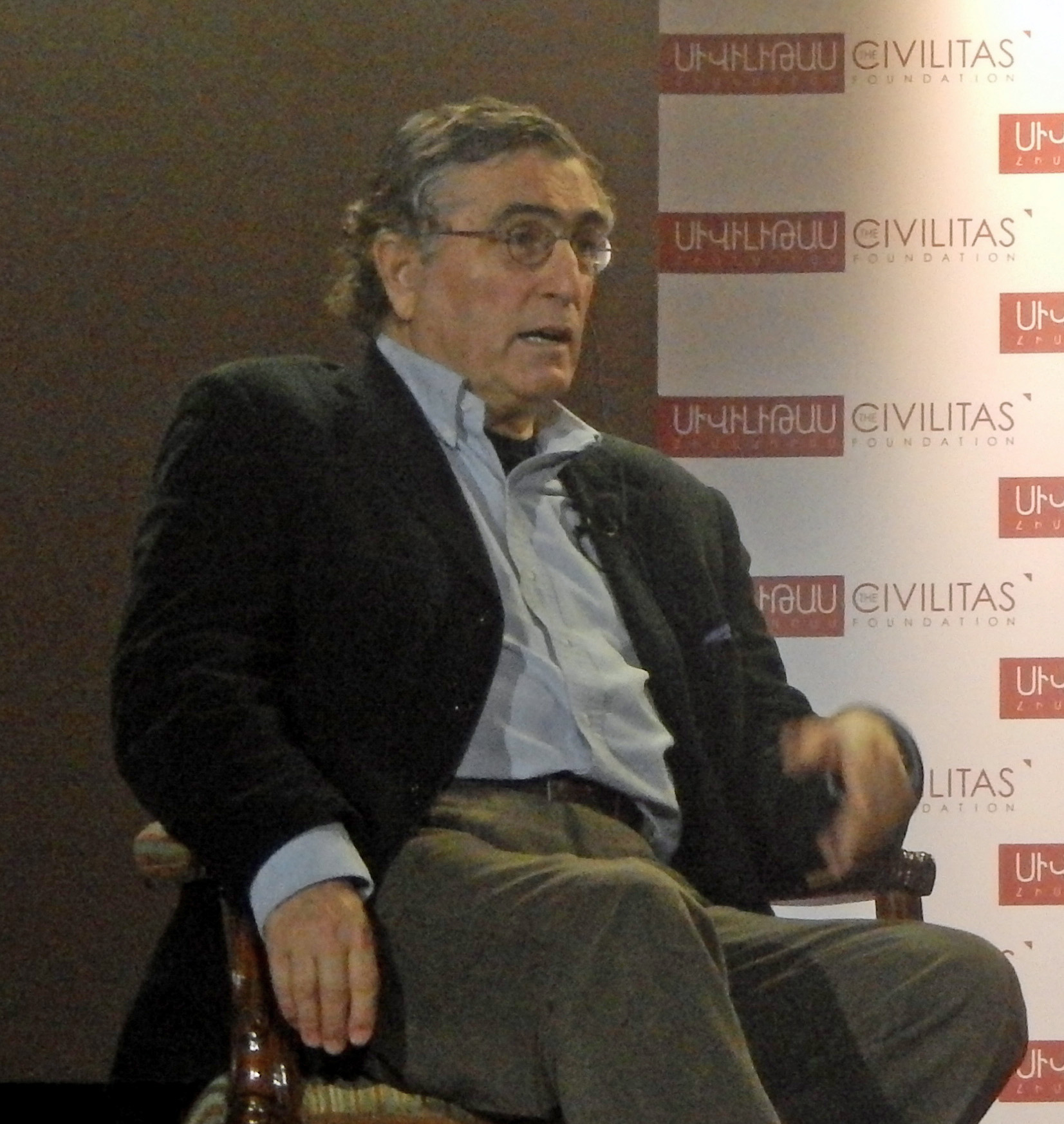
- Born: 1944 (age 81–82); Istanbul, Turkey
- Education: Ankara University
- Occupations: Journalist, writer

Hasan Cemal (born 1944) is a Turkish journalist and writer. He was the editor of Cumhuriyet from 1981 to 1992, and of Sabah from 1992 to 1998. In 2013 he resigned from the Milliyet newspaper after Prime Minister Recep Tayyip Erdoğan had criticised his article supporting Milliyet's publication of minutes of a parliamentary visit to Abdullah Öcalan, and Milliyet suspended him and refused to publish his returning column.

Cemal is the grandson of Djemal Pasha, one of the "Three Pashas" who led the Ottoman Empire during World War I. He is known for acknowledging and apologizing for the Armenian genocide, which was perpetrated in part by his grandfather and his colleagues. His 2012 book on the subject (written in response to the 2007 assassination of his friend Hrant Dink) is titled 1915: Ermeni Soykırımı (English: 1915: Armenian Genocide).

== Early life and education ==
Hasan Cemal was born in 1944 in Istanbul, Turkey. His mother had Georgian and Circassian ancestry. In 1965, Cemal graduated from the Faculty of Political Science, Ankara University with a Political Science Degree.

== Career ==
Cemal began working for the weekly Hakkı Devrim in 1969 and soon thereafter, he became an Ankara representative of the Cumhuriyet newspaper. In 1981, he was appointed chief editor of Cumhuriyet newspaper. He resigned in January 1992 in a dispute over editorial policy: "I tried to widen the spectrum, to keep the balance. But they (old-guard intellectuals) always resisted, calling us plotters, tools of big business and the United States". He became the editor of the Sabah newspaper in May 1992, remaining in the position until 1998. From 1998 he worked for Milliyet.

During the heightened tensions between the Kurdistan Workers' Party (PKK) and the Turkish government, Hasan Cemal would be noted for conducting interviews with notable PKK leaders such as Abdullah Öcalan and Murat Karayilan. In 2013 the Milliyet newspaper he wrote for suspended him for two weeks after Prime Minister Recep Tayyip Erdoğan had criticised his article supporting Milliyet's publication of minutes of a parliamentary visit to Öcalan. When Milliyet then refused to publish his returning column, he resigned. In 2018, he received a suspended sentence to a prison term of more than 3 months for his documentation of the withdrawal of the PKK in 2013.

He then started writing on the independent news website T24 in 2013. He was awarded the Nieman Foundation for Journalism Louis Lyons Award for Conscience and Integrity in Journalism in 2015. A column he published on 12 August 2015 harshly criticising President Erdoğan, titled "The Responsibility for the Bloodshed Lies on the Sultan at the Palace" led him to be prosecuted for insulting the President. The prosecutor demanded a prison sentence of 4 years and 8 months for Cemal.

== Armenian Genocide ==
According to Dennis Papazian of the University of Michigan's Armenian Research Center, in the 1980s, Hasan Cemal supported the Turkish government's position denying the Armenian Genocide. After some Turkish diplomats were assassinated by the armed Armenian ASALA group, he however began an inquiry and eventually changed his mind. Following a trip to Armenia, where he visited the Armenian Genocide memorial, Hasan Cemal published a book entitled 1915: The Armenian Genocide. The book became a bestseller in Turkey. Cemal remarked in his book, "To deny the Genocide would mean to be an accomplice in this crime against humanity."

The book highlights Cemal's "personal transformation" and his experiences in Armenia. While Cemal was in Armenia, he had an opportunity to meet and have lunch with Armen Gevorkyan, the grandson of Artashes Gevorgyan, the man who assassinated his grandfather Djemal Pasha in 1922.

Cemal eventually apologized to all Armenians for the Armenian genocide for his grandfather's part in it. Cemal also has insisted that the Turkish government should also apologize to the Armenians for the Armenian genocide.

== Works ==
Some of Hasan Cemal's works include:

- 1915: Ermeni Soykırımı (English: 1915: Armenian Genocide; 2012)
  - English edition translated by Liz Erçevik Amado and Irazca Geray, published by the Hrant Dink Foundation and the Gomidas Institute, 2015 (978-6056448-88-1).
- Barışa Emanet Olun (English: Be One with Peace; 2011)
- Türkiye'nin Asker Sorunu (English: Turkey's Military Problem; 2010)
- Cumhuriyet'i Çok Sevmiştim (English: I Really Liked Cumhuriyet; 2005)
- Kürtler (English: Kurds; 2004)
- Kimse Kızmasın, Kendimi Yazdım (English: Don't Be Mad, I Wrote Myself; 1999)
- Özal Hikayesi (English: The Story of Özal; 1989)
- Tarihi Yaşarken Yakalamak (English: To Catch History Alive; 1987)
- Demokrasi Korkusu (English: Fear of Democracy; 1986)
- Tank Sesiyle Uyanmak (English: Waking Up to the Sound of Tanks; 1986)

== Awards ==
Some of Hasan Cemal's awards include:

- The Fıkra Award from the Doruktakiler ve Gazeteciler Cemiyeti (1989)
- Sedat Simavi Award for Journalist of the Year (1986)

== See also ==
- List of visitors to Tsitsernakaberd
