= Sefer Aycan =

Turkish academic and politician

- Born: March 16, 1963 (age 62); Kahramanmaraş, Turkey
- Education: Gazi University
- Years active: 1986–present
- Known for: Public Health
- Medical career
- Profession: Doctor
- Institutions: Gazi University; University of Michigan
- Sub-specialties: Public Health
- Research: Health Economics, Epidemiology, Health Management

Sefer Aycan (born March 16, 1963) is a Turkish doctor of public health, politician, academic, and ex-Undersecretary of the Turkish Health Ministry.

== Early life and education ==
Aycan was born in Kahramanmaraş, completing his primary and secondary education in Kahramanmaraş Province.

== Personal life ==
He married with Zehra Aycan (teacher at Yıldırım Beyazıt University graduated from Gazi University) in 1991. They have two(Çağrı and Gökalp) children.

== Education and career ==
- 1989 Gazi University Faculty of Medicine Public Health Master of Science (M.S.)
- 1990 Gazi University Faculty of Medicine Public Health Lecturer
- 1995 Gazi University Faculty of Medicine Public Health Assistant Professor
- 1997 Gazi University Faculty of Medicine Public Health Associate Professor
- 1999 - 2001 Health Ministry of Turkey Primary Health Care General Manager
- 2001 - 2002 Health Ministry of Turkey Undersecretary
- 2004 Gazi University Faculty of Medicine Public Health Professor
- 2009 Gazi University Faculty of Medicine Public Health Head of Division

== Political career ==
Aycan was selected from Kahramanmaraş as a Member of Turkish Parliament (representative of MHP) in the June 2015 Turkish general election.
