= Abdulhamit Gül =

Turkish politician (born 1977)

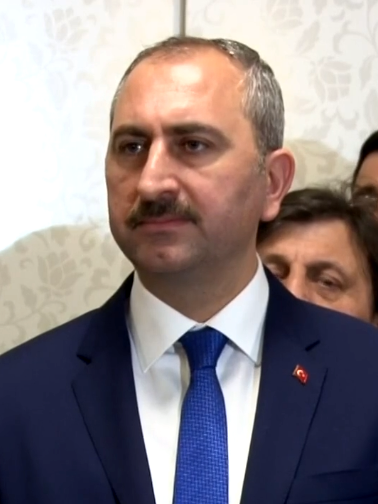

Minister of Justice
- In office 19 July 2017 – 29 January 2022
- President: Recep Tayyip Erdoğan
- Prime Minister: Binali Yıldırım (2017–18)
- Preceded by: Bekir Bozdağ
- Succeeded by: Bekir Bozdağ

General Secretary of the Justice and Development Party
- In office 13 September 2015 – 20 July 2017
- Preceded by: Haluk İpek
- Succeeded by: Fatih Şahin

Member of the Grand National Assembly
- Incumbent
- Assumed office 2 June 2023
- Constituency: Gaziantep (2023)
- In office 23 June 2015 – 10 July 2018
- Constituency: Gaziantep (June 2015, Nov 2015, 2018)

Personal details
- Born: 12 March 1977 (age 49) Nizip, Gaziantep, Turkey
- Party: Welfare Party (1996–1998); Virtue Party (1998–2001); Felicity Party (2001–2010); People's Voice Party (2010–2012); Justice and Development Party (2012–present)
- Spouse: İlknur Gül
- Children: 3

Abdulhamit Gül (Turkish: Abdülhamit Gül; born 12 March 1977) is a Turkish politician who served as Minister of Justice from 2017-2022. A member of the Justice and Development Party (AKP), he has represented Gaziantep in the Grand National Assembly of Turkey since 2023, having previously held the seat between 2015-2018, and served as the AKP's General Secretary from 2015-2017. As justice minister, he oversaw the 2019 Judicial Reform Strategy Document and the 2021 Human Rights Action Plan, two flagship legal-reform initiatives of the Erdoğan government; His tenure also coincided with the Council of Europe's 2021 decision to open infringement proceedings against Turkey over its non-compliance with a European Court of Human Rights ruling in the case of Osman Kavala.

was previously the General Secretary of the Justice and Development Party. He was re-elected at the 2023 Turkish parliamentary election in Gaziantep.

He is not related with Abdullah Gül.

== Early life and education ==
Gül was born to working-class parents in Nizip on 12 March 1977. His father is originally from Artvin. His mother was the daughter of an Islamic scholar born in Çermik and mentored by Said Nursî. She knew Kurdish. Gül attended a local high school, showing political interest from a young age. He completed his higher education at Ankara University.

== Early political career ==
He was a member of board in the Ankara Youth Community of the Virtue Party (FP) and the Welfare Party (RP). He was head of the National Youth Foundation from 1999 to 2001. Between 2001 and 2003, he was the vice chairman of FP. From 2003 to 2010, he sat on FP's General Administration Board. From November 2010 to 22 September 2012, he served on the Founders' Board of People's Voice Party (HSP).

After HSP merged into the AKP, he was chosen as a member of the party's Official Decision and Administration Committee on 30 September 2012, at the 4th Ordinary Congress of AKP. He was elected to parliament as a deputy for Gaziantep in the general election of June 2015. He served as General Secretary of AKP from 13 September 2015, until being replaced by Fatih Şahin on 20 July 2017.

=== Minister of Justice (2017–2022) ===
Gül was appointed Minister of Justice on 19 July 2017, succeeding Bekir Bozdağ.

=== Judicial Reform Strategy Document and Human Rights Action Plan ===
In May 2019, the government unveiled the Judicial Reform Strategy Document, prepared by Gül's ministry, setting out nine goals and a large number of associate targets aimed at strengthening judicial independence, freedom of expression, and access to justice, and explicitly framed as part of Turkey's EU accession process. A follow-up Human Rights Action Plan, covering 2021-2023 was announced in March 2021. Speaking at the 2021 December meeting of Council of Europe justice ministers in Vienna, Gül described the two documents as the government's central policy instruments for judicial reform.

=== Council of Europe infringement proceedings ===
Gül's tenure coincided with a prolong dispute between Turkey and the Council of Europe over the imprisonment of civil society figure Osman Kavala. After the European Court of human Rights ruled that Kavala's continued detention violated the European Convention on Human Rights and Turkey did not release him, the Council of Europe's Committee Ministers opened infringement proceedings against Turkey in December 2021, a rarely used mechanism that can ultimately lead to a member state's suspension.

Turkish officials, including Gül, rejected the criticism; at the same December 2021 Venice meeting, Foreign Minister Mevlüt Çavuşoğlu said Turkey had complied with the ECtHR ruling on Kavala but that he remained imprisoned in connection with separate proceedings, and argued the Turkey was being scrutinized more harshly than other Council of Europe members with unimplemented ECtHR judgments.

Political offices
Preceded by Bekir Bozdağ	Minister of Justice; 19 July 2017 – 29 January 2022	Succeeded by Bekir Bozdağ
