= Faik Ahmet Barutçu =

Turkish politician (1894–1959)

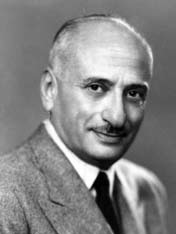
- Faik Ahmet Barutçu

Vice Prime minister
- In office September 10, 1947 – January 16, 1949
- Prime Minister: Hasan Saka
- Preceded by: Mümtaz Ökmen
- Succeeded by: Nihat Erim

Personal details
- Born: 1894 Trabzon, Trebizond vilayet, Ottoman Empire
- Died: 1959 (aged 62–63)
- Party: Progressive Republican Party; Republican People's Party (CHP)
- Education: Istanbul University Faculty of Law

Faik Ahmet Barutçu (1894–1959) was a Turkish politician.

== Biography ==
Born in Trabzon during the Ottoman era, he studied law in Istanbul University. In 1918 he returned to Trabzon to publish the newspaper İstikbal which was a supporter of Turkish War of Independence. After the Republic was proclaimed on 29 October 1923, he joined the Progressive Republican Party .

On 26 March 1939, he was elected as a Republican People's Party (CHP) MP from Trabzon Electoral District. In 16th and the 17th government of Turkey between 10 September 1947– 16 January 1949 (1st and 2nd Hasan Saka governments) he was the Vice Prime Minister. On 14 May 1950 his party was defeated in the elections, but he kept his seat in the parliament. CHP became the main opposition party and Barutçu became the vice speaker of the CHP parliamentary group. In 1954-1947 term (10th parliament of Turkey) he lost his seat in the parliament. After the next elections he returned to parliament. He died on 14 March 1959 in Ankara.
