= Celalettin Güvenç =

Turkish politician (born 1959)

Celalettin Güvenç (born 1 January 1959) is a Turkish politician from the Justice and Development Party who has been a member of the Grand National Assembly of Turkey since 2015. He represents the electorate of Kahramanmaraş.

== Personal life ==
His younger brother Sıtkı Güvenç, who was MP for Kahramanmaraş from 2011 to 2015, died from his injuries sustained in the 2023 Turkey–Syria earthquake.

== See also ==
- 26th Parliament of Turkey
- 27th Parliament of Turkey
