= Ziya Burhanettin Güvenç =

Ziya Burhanettin Güvenç is professor of physics. Güvenç graduated from Department of Physics of Ankara University in 1981 and he finished his master's degree at the Ankara University in 1984, too. He completed his doctorate degree at University of California and he began to work at METU. Güvenç became a professor in 2001. In 2011, he was elected The rector of the year by Educators Association of Volunteer Organizations of Turkey.
