= Emrullah Güvenç =

Turkish footballer

Personal information
- Full name: Emrullah Güvenç
- Date of birth: 27 January 1987 (age 39)
- Place of birth: Genk, Belgium
- Height: 1.65 m (5 ft 5 in)
- Position: Midfielder

Senior career*
| Years | Team | Apps | (Gls) |
| 2004–2008 | Fortuna Sittard | 75 | (9) |
| 2009–2011 | FC Oss | 74 | (17) |
| 2011–2012 | Kartalspor | 0 | (0) |
| 2012–2013 | Helmond Sport | 48 | (24) |
| 2013–2015 | Antwerp | 65 | (26) |
| 2015–2017 | MVV | 54 | (9) |
| 2017–2018 | Sporting Hasselt | | |
| Total | | 316 | (85) |

International career
| 2005 | Turkey U19 | 2 | (0) |
- * Club domestic league appearances and goals

Emrullah Güvenç (born 27 January 1987) is a former professional footballer. He has represented Turkey at under-19 level. His older brother Serdal Güvenç is also a professional football player.

== Career ==
Güvenç made his debut in the Dutch Eerste Divisie (D2) with Fortuna Sittard in 2004. Since then, he played over 170 games and scored more than 40 times. Because of his strong performance during the first period of season 2012–13 season, in which he scored 9 goals in 10 appearances, Güvenç was given the nickname "Superturk" by the Belgian press.

After having played for Sporting Hasselt for one season, Güvenç joined amateur club FC Anadol in June 2018.

== Personal life ==
After his professional career, Güvenç began owning a restaurant in his hometown Genk together with his wife, Tuba Gedik.
