= Fatih Şahin =

Turkish politician (born 1979)

General Secretary of the Justice and Development Party
- Incumbent
- Assumed office 20 July 2017
- Preceded by: Abdulhamit Gül

Personal details
- Born: 20 April 1979 (age 46) Ankara, Turkey
- Party: Justice and Development Party
- Spouse: Elif Şahin
- Children: 2

Fatih Şahin (born 20 April 1979) is a Turkish politician, lawyer, and General Secretary of the Justice and Development Party (Turkish: AK Parti), serving since 20 July 2017.

== Personal life ==
He is fluent in English and Arabic. He is married and has two children.
