= Serdal Güvenç =

Turkish footballer

Personal information
- Full name: Serdal Güvenç
- Date of birth: 20 May 1984 (age 42)
- Place of birth: Maaseik, Belgium
- Height: 1.78 m (5 ft 10 in)
- Position: Defender

Team information
- Current team: Raków Częstochowa (assistant)

Youth career
- Maasmechelen
- Lommel United

Senior career*
Years	Team	Apps	(Gls)
2002–2004	Patro Maasmechelen	25	(0)
2004–2005	Lommel United	3	(0)
2005–2007	Fortuna Sittard	27	(0)
2008	Kırşehirspor	12	(0)
2008–2009	Akhisar Belediyespor	1	(0)
2009–2011	FC Oss	37	(2)
2011–2012	Verbroedering Geel-Meerhout	10	(0)
2012–2014	Lutlommel VV		
2014–2016	KESK Leopoldsburg		
2016–2017	KVK Wellen		
2018–2023	KFC Anadol		

Managerial career
- 2022–2023: Sint-Truiden (youth)
- 2023–2024: Sint-Truiden U21
- * Club domestic league appearances and goals

Serdal Güvenç (born 20 May 1984) is a Turkish professional football coach and former player who played as a defender. He currently works as an assistant coach at Ekstraklasa club Raków Częstochowa. He is the older brother of fellow footballer Emrullah Güvenç.
