= Yetkin Yıldız =

Turkish journalist

- Occupation: Journalist
- Known for: Editor of the news website Aktifhaber; Imprisoned journalist in Turkey

Yetkin Yıldız is a Turkish journalist who was the editor of the news website Aktifhaber. A court in Istanbul sentenced Yıldız to seven years and six months in prison for alleged membership in a terrorist organisation.

Yıldız was originally arrested on 22 July 2016 as part of an investigation into the anonymous Twitter account Fuat Avni, which claimed to be run by a government insider leaking information on the ruling Justice and Development Party (AKP). On 24 July 2016, a court in Istanbul ordered Yıldız to be detained pending trial on charges of being a member of an alleged Gülenist terrorist organisation. He was sentenced to seven years and six months, convicted of belonging to the Gülenist organisation that Turkey's government accused of orchestrating the failed July 2016 coup d'état. Yıldız was sentenced in March 2018 along with a number of other journalists accused of belonging to Gülen's network. Other journalists charged in the same case included Ahmet Memiş, Ali Akkuş, Muhammed Sait Kuloğlu, Mustafa Erkan Acar, Oğuz Usluer, Ufuk Şanlı, Cuma Ulus, Mutlu Çölgeçen, Ünal Tanık, Seyid Kılıç, and Davut Aydın.

Following this first conviction, Yıldız was further accused of slander by Justice and Development Party (AKP) Bursa MP Efkan Ala. Yıldız appeared in court via the video-conference system SEGBIS. Yıldız's lawyers rejected the accusations of defamation and requested a copy of the official court proceedings. The court adjourned and set the date for the next hearing on 17 December 2019.
