= Pelican files =

Turkish political documents leaked in 2016

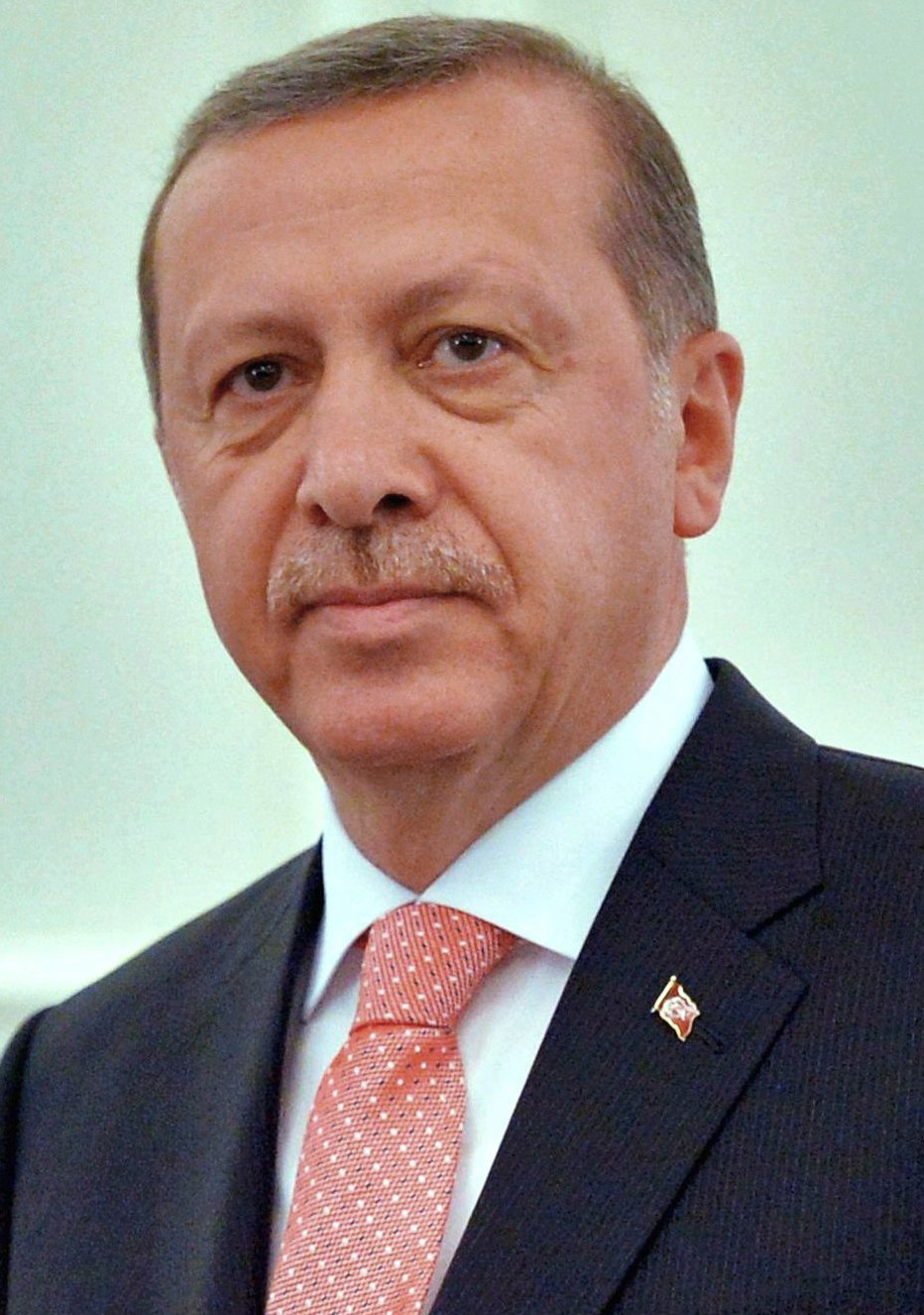
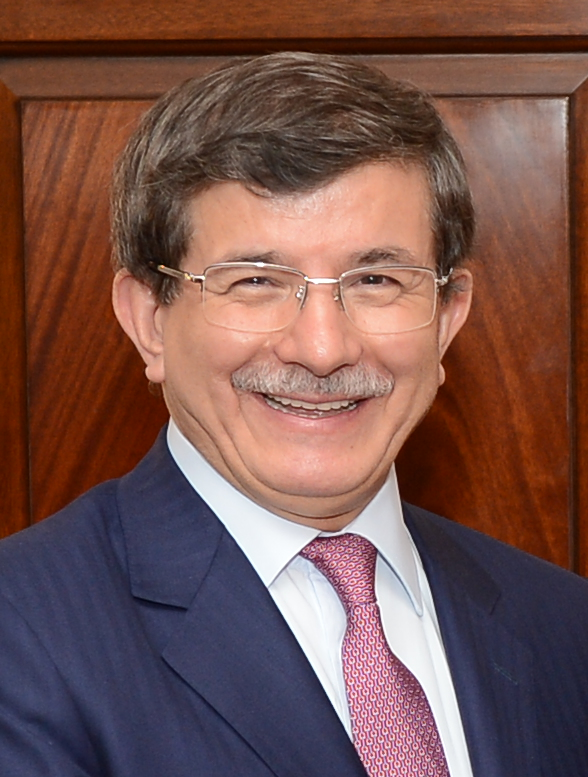
President Recep Tayyip Erdoğan (left) and Prime Minister Ahmet Davutoğlu (right)

The Pelican files (Turkish: Pelikan dosyası) also called the "Pelican Brief" were an anonymous blog published on WordPress on 1 May, 2016. It listed 27 alleged instances of Ahmet Davutoğlu, then prime minister of Turkey, disobeying or undermining President Recep Tayyip Erdoğan since both took office on 28 August, 2014. The name is taken from to John Grisham's novel The Pelican Brief and its 1993 film adaptation. The blog was written from the standpoint of a hard line Erdoğan loyalist. Its author or authors were never publicly identified and the presidency denied any involvement.

The blog appeared days after the AKP's Central Decision Board (MKYK) stripped Davutoğlu of power to appoint provincial party chairs. On 5 May Davutoğlu announced that he would not stand for re-election as party leader and on 22 May Binali Yıldırım, the sole candidate, was elected to succeed him and was authorised by Erdoğan to form a new government. Analysts have described the blog as a "detonator" of Davutoğlu's fall, while others argued that his removal had been decided before.

The publication and aim of the "memorandum" was predicted by blogger Fuat Avni. On 19 April 2016 he wrote that Erdoğan was planning a "coup against Davutoğlu" and that the "pelican" of "Berat and Serhat" (a reference to Erdoğan's son-in-law and his brother) was about to fly. It is described as a palace coup d'état in Turkish social media and other sources.

== Background ==
The Justice and Development Party (AKP), founded by the current President and former prime minister Recep Tayyip Erdoğan, has been in power ever since winning the 2002 general elections by a landslide. In the 2014 presidential election, Erdoğan ran as the AKP's candidate and was elected president with 51.79% of the vote, naming Davutoğlu as his successor as party leader and prime minister. Many commentators claimed that Davutoğlu would take a submissive approach as Prime Minister while Erdoğan continued pursuing his political agenda as president, including the establishment of an executive presidency that would boost his powers. The Pelican files released in April 2016 detailed disagreements between Erdoğan and Davutoğlu on several issues concerning both national and inner-party political developments.

== Items ==
The 27 items detailed in the Pelican files are listed below.

1. Erdoğan opposed and stopped the enacting of a 'transparency law', a piece of legislation that Davutoğlu had wanted to implement shortly after becoming prime minister.
2. Davutoğlu was allegedly in favour of the four former AKP government ministers, namely Egemen Bağış, Zafer Çağlayan, Muammer Güler and Erdoğan Bayraktar, being sent to the Supreme Court for their role in the 2013 government corruption scandal. AKP Members of Parliament later voted against the motion to send the four ministers to the Supreme Court after Erdoğan instructed them to block the motion.
3. Davutoğlu was responsible for the parliamentary candidacy of Hakan Fidan, Undersecretary of the National Intelligence Organisation (Turkish: Milli istihbarat Teşkilatı abbreviated MİT) for the June 2015 general election, which was overturned by Erdoğan and resulted in Fidan being re-instated as MİT Undersecretary after he withdrew his candidacy.
4. Davutoğlu allowed the Dolmabahçe Statement, a result of negotiations during the Solution process with Kurdish rebels, to be released in public. Following public criticism by Erdoğan, an important section of the Statement which established an 'Oversight Committee' was abandoned, followed shortly after by the entire solution process altogether.
5. Davutoğlu supported Deputy Prime Minister Bülent Arınç, who publicly criticised Erdoğan over interfering with the Dolmabahçe Statement.
6. Relations also allegedly soured due to Davutoğlu giving press statements and interviews to media and news outlets that had been known for criticising Erdoğan.
7. Tensions between the two politicians after the June elections rose after Davutoğlu claimed that the people had rejected Erdoğan's call for an executive presidency.
8. It was alleged that Davutoğlu supported Nationalist Movement Party (Turkish: Milliyetçi Hareket partisi abbreviated MHP) leader Devlet Bahçeli after the June 2015 election resulted in a hung parliament, who had claimed that the MHP's precondition for a coalition agreement with the AKP would be for Erdoğan's family (and in particular his son, Bilal Erdoğan) to go on trial for alleged corruption.
9. A general disagreement between Davutoğlu and Erdoğan over whether the AKP should have pushed for a coalition agreement or early elections after the inconclusive June 2015 vote was also included in the files.
10. Davutoğlu was accused of establishing his own media network, including a newspaper, that would be supportive of him.
11. Davutoğlu was also accused of censoring some pro-Erdoğan media material.
12. It emerged that the establishment of the pro-Davutoğlu news outlets would be financed by an undisclosed allowance paid to the Office of the Prime Minister directly from the national budget.
13. It was further alleged that Davutoğlu and Erdoğan had argued over who would stand for election to the AKP's Central Executive Decision Committee (MKYK) in the party's 5th Ordinary Congress in September 2015. Erdoğan supporter Binali Yıldırım had been collecting signatures for a potential leadership bid up until Davutoğlu backed down to Erdoğan's demands.
14. Disagreements over Davutoğlu's attempts to lift political immunities from prosecution, as well as his decision to consult the Peoples' Democratic Party (HDP) on the proposals resulted in tensions with Erdoğan to increase further.
15. Erdoğan allegedly strongly protested Davutoğlu for claiming that his government could restart the Solution process if the Kurdistan Workers' Party (PKK) reverted to the situation in 2013.
16. Furthermore, Davutoğlu was criticised for not opposing an AKP MP who claimed that 'everything would be alright if the Parallel state (Gülen Movement) reverted to its factory values.'
17. Davutoğlu allegedly did not voice criticism over European Parliament President Martin Schulz calling Erdoğan 'authoritarian' in response to Erdoğan's calls for a German video criticising him to be censored.
18. Similarly, Erdoğan blamed Davutoğlu for not speaking up for the Presidency when Schulz claimed that Davutoğlu, as prime minister, would be recognised as the official representative of the Turkish Government in negotiations with the European Union
19. The Presidency alleged that it was not consulted by Davutoğlu during the European migrant crisis negotiations for visa-free entry by Turkish nationals to the European Union. Davutoğlu was also accused of not criticising European media outlets that had voiced scepticism of Erdoğan.
20. Competition between Davutoğlu and Erdoğan had been reported over who would get to meet US President Barack Obama during an official visit to the United States
21. Davutoğlu allegedly attempted to recruit some of the AKP's most notorious social media trolls (known as 'AK Trolls') to support him against Erdoğan
22. Advisors and journalists close to Davutoğlu were accused of supporting the restarting of negotiations with the PKK.
23. Davutoğlu and Erdoğan allegedly disagreed on whether arrested journalists Can Dündar and Erdem Gül should be tried while in custody.
24. Davutoğlu invited Arınç to a 'public opening' rally in Manisa shortly before the June 2015 vote.
25. Davutoğlu's relations with Erdoğan further deteriorated after he visited the Taraf newspaper, known to be critical of Erdoğan
26. Erdoğan allegedly blocked some of Davutoğlu's preferred appointments to high-ranking bureaucratic positions.
27. Davutoğlu allegedly angered Erdoğan when he claimed that the 1,100 academics arrested for signing a resolution calling for peace in the south-east of Turkey should not have been taken into custody.

== Aftermath ==
The release of the Pelican files were seen as proof of several earlier media reports of growing rifts between Davutoğlu and Erdoğan, though the Presidency denied any involvement with its release. In early May, the AKP's Central Executive Decision Committee (MKYK) voted to revoke the leader's ability to appoint provincial and district party representatives and instead delegated that power to the MKYK as a whole. On 3 May, Davutoğlu gave a speech at an AKP parliamentary group meeting that was interpreted by the press as a 'resignation speech' due to its short length. Rumours emerged that Davutoğlu had submitted his resignation to the Presidency earlier.

On 4 May 2016, Davutoğlu met with Erdoğan at the Presidential Complex, a day earlier than the usual Thursday weekly meeting. The meeting lasted for 1 hour and 40 minutes, after which neither the Presidency nor the Prime Minister's Office made a statement, although the Presidency claimed that the meeting was 'routine'. Shortly after, it was declared that Davutoğlu would assemble the party MKYK before making a public speech at another parliamentary group meeting of AKP MPs. At the same time, it was reported that the party had taken the decision to call an Extraordinary Congress. Davutoğlu would not stand for re-election as party leader and commentators claimed that a pro-Erdoğan figure would become the AKP's next leader.

== See also ==
- Fuat Avni
