= Akın Gürlek =

Minister of Justice of the Republic of Turkey

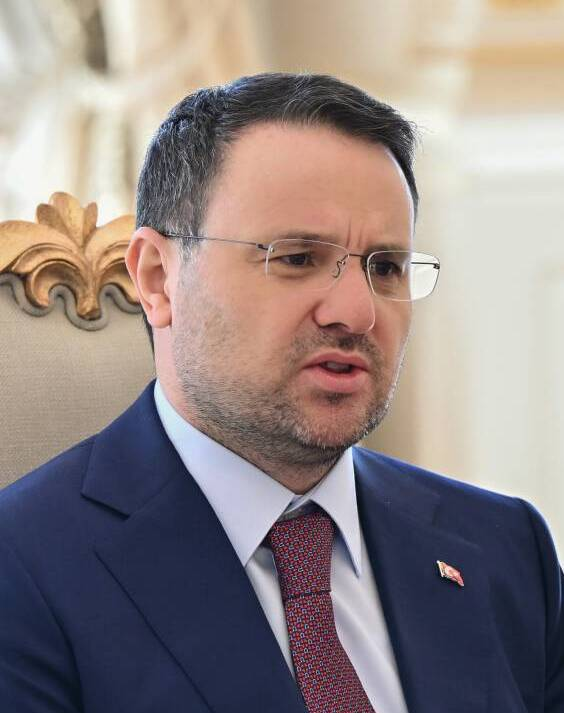
- Gürlek in 2026

Minister of Justice
- Incumbent
- Assumed office 11 February 2026
- President: Recep Tayyip Erdoğan
- Preceded by: Yılmaz Tunç

Personal details
- Born: 1982 (age 43–44) Nevşehir, Turkey

Akın Gürlek (born 1982, Nevşehir) is a Turkish jurist and politician serving as the Minister of Justice in the 67th cabinet of Turkey since 11 February 2026. Most recently he was the Chief Public prosecutor of Istanbul court, making him a controversial figure in regards to political trials.

== Life and career ==
He was born in Nevşehir in 1982. He graduated from Marmara University Faculty of Law in 2005.

Gürlek, who served as a judge in various regions of Turkey, was promoted to first-class judge in 2021. Gürlek made headlines in Turkey with the decisions he made while serving as president of the Istanbul 26th Heavy Penal Court, 37th Heavy Penal Court, and 14th Heavy Penal Court.

During his tenure as President of the Istanbul 26th Heavy Penal Court, Selahattin Demirtaş and Sırrı Süreyya Önder were tried for “terrorist organization propaganda,” with Demirtaş receiving a sentence of 4 years and 8 months and Önder receiving a sentence of 3 years and 6 months. This decision formed the basis for the political ban imposed on Demirtaş.

The prosecution appealed the release decision issued by the Istanbul 37th Heavy Penal Court in the ÇHD case, in which 20 lawyers, including Selçuk Kozağaçlı, were tried. The court panel was changed, and the newly appointed panel, chaired by Akın Gürlek, handed down prison sentences. Kozağaçlı was re-arrested.

Former Turkish Medical Association (TTB) president Şebnem Korur Fincancı was tried on charges of terrorist organization propaganda for signing the “We Will Not Be Complicit in This Crime” declaration. In the trial presided over by Akın Gürlek, president of the Istanbul 37th Heavy Penal Court, Fincancı was sentenced to 2 years and 6 months in prison.

During his tenure as President of the Istanbul 37th Heavy Penal Court, Canan Kaftancıoğlu was tried for some of her social media posts and sentenced to 9 years and 8 months in prison. With this decision, which did not include a suspension or postponement of the sentence, restrictions were placed on Kaftancıoğlu's ability to serve as a party executive.

The trial of the managers, writers, and employees of the Sözcü newspaper, who were prosecuted on charges of “knowingly and willingly aiding the organization without being part of FETÖ's hierarchical structure,” is another important case heard by the Istanbul 37th Heavy Penal Court, presided over by Akın Gürlek. In this case, journalists Necati Doğru and Emin Çölaşan were sentenced to 3 years, 6 months, and 15 days in prison. Other defendants received prison sentences of varying lengths.

During his tenure as president of the Istanbul 14th Heavy Penal Court, he failed to implement the Constitutional Court's ruling on the violation concerning Enis Berberoğlu. For this reason, he was criticized by Kemal Kılıçdaroğlu, then leader of the CHP, who compared him to “the new Zekeriya Öz.” Gürlek filed a 75,000 TRY damages lawsuit against Kılıçdaroğlu for these statements but lost the case.

After the MİT TIRs case, he declared Can Dündar, the former editor-in-chief of Cumhuriyet newspaper who had left the country, a “fugitive” and ordered the seizure of his real estate.

While still in the same position, he presided over the panel in the trial concerning the assassination of Hrant Dink. At the end of the trial, it was ruled that the murder was committed in line with FETÖ's objectives.

In April 2021, he was promoted to first-class judge by the Council of Judges and Prosecutors. Subsequently, on June 2, 2022, he was appointed Deputy Minister of Justice, replacing Uğurhan Kuş, who had been appointed to the Council of State.

Gürlek was appointed as Istanbul Chief Public Prosecutor by the Council of Judges and Prosecutors on October 2, 2024.

== Political career ==
=== Minister of Justice ===
Gürlek was appointed Minister of Justice by Presidential Decree No. 2026/51 dated February 11, 2026.

Political offices
Preceded by Yılmaz Tunç	Minister of Justice; 11 February 2026 – present	Incumbent
