= Sıtkı Güvenç =

Turkish politician (1961–2023)

Member of the Grand National Assembly of Turkey
- In office 2011–2015
- Constituency: Kahramanmaraş

Personal details
- Born: 1 November 1961
- Died: 9 February 2023 (aged 61)
- Party: Justice and Development
- Relations: Celalettin Güvenç (brother)

Sıtkı Güvenç (1 November 1961 – 9 February 2023) was a Turkish politician from the Justice and Development Party who was a member of the Grand National Assembly of Turkey from 2011 to 2015. He represented the electorate of Kahramanmaraş.

Güvenç died after being critically injured during the 2023 Turkey–Syria earthquake, three days after the quake.

== Personal life ==
His brother Celalettin Güvenç is also an MP from Kahramanmaraş.

== See also ==
- 24th Parliament of Turkey
