= Kahramanmaraş (electoral district) =

Electoral district for the Grand National Assembly of Turkey

Coordinates: 38°00′N 37°00′E

- electoral district for the Grand National Assembly of Turkey
- Kahramanmaraş shown within Turkey
- Province: Kahramanmaraş
- Electorate: 656,579

Current electoral district
- Created: 1923
- Seats: 8 Historical: 9 (1999–2002) 8 (1995–1999) 7 (1987–1995) 6 (1983–1987) 7 (1973–1983) 6 (1961–1973) 9 (1957–1961) 7 (1954–1957)
- MPs: List: Mehmet Sağlam AKP Nevzat Pakdil AKP Mahir Ünal AKP Yıldırım Mehmet Ramazanoğlu AKP Sevde Bayazıt Kaçar AKP Sıtkı Güvenç AKP Mesut Dedeoğlu MHP Durdu Özbolat CHP
- Turnout at last election: 86.72%
- Representation
- AK Party: 6 / 8
- MHP: 2 / 8

Kahramanmaraş is an electoral district of the Grand National Assembly of Turkey. It elects eight members of parliament (deputies) to represent the province of the same name for a four-year term by the D'Hondt method, a party-list proportional representation system.

== Members ==
Population reviews of each electoral district are conducted before each general election, which can lead to certain districts being granted a smaller or greater number of parliamentary seats. Kahramanmaraş's seat allocation has always been relatively consistent, hovering between six and nine MPs since 1954.

MPs for Kahramanmaraş, 1999 onwards
Seat	1999 (21st Parliament)	2002 (22nd Parliament)	2007 (23rd Parliament)	2011 (24th Parliament)	June 2015 (25th Parliament)
1	Mustafa Kamalak; FP	Nevzat Pakdil; AK Party			Nursel Reyhanlıoğlu; AK Party
2	Avni Doğan; FP	Avni Doğan; AK Party		Mahir Ünal; AK Party	
3	Ali Sezal; FP	Ali Sezal; AK Party	Cafer Tatlıbal; AK Party	Yıldırım Mehmet Ramazanoğlu; AK Party	Mehmet Uğur Dilipak; AK Party
4	Mehmet Sağlam; DYP	Hanefi Mahçiçek; AK Party	Mehmet Sağlam; AK Party		Veysi Kaynak; AK Party
5	Metin Kocabaş; DYP	Mehmet Ali Bulut; AK Party	Veysi Kaynak; AK Party	Sevde Bayazıt Kaçar; AK Party	
6	Edip Özbaş; MHP	Fatih Arıkan; AK Party		Sıtkı Güvenç; AK Party	Mehmet İlker Çitil; AK Party
7	Mehmet Kaya; MHP	Mehmet Parlakyiğit; CHP	Durdu Özbolat; CHP		Fahrettin Oğuz Tor; MHP
8	Nevzat Taner; MHP	Nevzat Taner; MHP	Nevzat Taner; MHP	Mesut Dedeoğlu; MHP	Sefer Aycan; MHP
9	Ali Doğan; Anavatan	No seat			

== General elections ==
=== 2011 ===
2011 general election: Kahramanmaraş
Party	Candidate	Votes	%	±%
AK Party	6 elected 0: 1. Mehmet Sağlam ✓; 2. Nevzat Pakdil ✓; 3. Mahir Ünal ✓; 4. Yıldırım Mehmet Ramazanoğlu ✓; 5. Sevde Bayazıt Kaçar ✓; 6. Sıtkı Güvenç ✓; 7. Hamdi Bülent Eken ✗; 8. İdris Tezcan ✗	391,986	69.57	▲1.57
MHP	1 elected 0: 1. Mesut Dedeoğlu ✓; 2. Fahrettin Oğuz Tor ✗; 3. Ejder Oruç ✗; 4. Şule Arıkan ✗; 5. Aydoğan Büyüköz ✗; 6. Kamil Koca ✗; 7. Hüseyin Cahit Gökşen ✗; 8. Necati Karatuluk ✗	73,151	12.98	▲0.59
CHP	1 elected 0: 1. Durdu Özbolat ✓; 2. Kemal Sağ ✗; 3. Duran Özdal ✗; 4. Murat Kapan ✗; 5. Yaşar Güngör ✗; 6. Ramazan Burhan ✗; 7. Türkan Özbek ✗; 8. Mehmet Okuç ✗	64,584	11.46	▲1.63
Büyük Birlik	None elected: 1. Remzi Çayır ✗; 2. Nedat Türk ✗; 3. Elife Özgül ✗; 4. Ali Alagöz ✗; 5. Musa Göztaş ✗; 6. Feridun Özdemir ✗; 7. Bülent Kaya ✗; 8. Fatma Kuşçu ✗	11,103	1.97	▲1.97
SAADET	None elected: 1. Cuma Tahiroğlu ✗; 2. Ömer Polat ✗; 3. Mehmet Tahir Gören ✗; 4. Emin Odabaşı ✗; 5. Sami Polat ✗; 6. Veli Kabaağaç ✗; 7. Ali Doruk ✗; 8. Talip Gülbay ✗	7,374	1.31	▼0.15
HAS Party	None elected: 1. Mustafa Kabalcı ✗; 2. Niyazi Güney ✗; 3. Ali Fahri Şirikçi ✗; 4. Fatih Polat ✗; 5. Abdullah Genç ✗; 6. Bünyamin Yumrukaya ✗; 7. Hacı İbrahim Pıçak ✗; 8. Kenan Akkurt ✗	5,239	0.93	▲0.93
Independent	None elected: Mustafa Mamaklı ✗	3,031	0.54	▼0.81
DP	None elected: 1. Ramazan Deveci ✗; 2. Zühtü Kazancı ✗; 3. Cahit Güçlü ✗; 4. Ali Demirci ✗; 5. Ali Ceyhan ✗; 6. Ejder Nafiz Özdemir ✗; 7. Güller Telek ✗; 8. Celal Bağcı ✗	2,941	0.52	▼3.90
DYP	None elected: 1. İdris Akkaya ✗; 2. İsmail Nacar ✗; 3. Mehmet Fatih Eken ✗; 4. Şaban Solak ✗; 5. Murat Erdoğan ✗; 6. Mehmet Ali Pekemen ✗; 7. Durdu Çağlar ✗; 8. İlhan Yıldız ✗	850	0.15	▲0.15
HEPAR	None elected: 1. Ahmet Gebel ✗; 2. Vedat Üçgöz ✗; 3. Hakan Torun ✗; 4. Harun Akkurt ✗; 5. İbrahim Bayazıt ✗; 6. Asuman Yılmaz ✗; 7. Gürkan Emlik ✗; 8. Abdulkadir Ceren ✗	769	0.14	▲0.14
DSP	None elected: 1. Salman Diliuz ✗; 2. Canan Palalı ✗; 3. Mesut Şahan ✗; 4. Mevlüt Öztütüncü ✗; 5. Muzaffer Yıldırım ✗; 6. Eyyüp Dalgın ✗; 7. Bülent Bulut ✗; 8. Hasan Sünbül ✗	629	0.11	N/A
Labour	None elected: 1. İbrahim Aksoy ✗; 2. Battal Bayar ✗; 3. Hidayet Kalınlıoğlu ✗; 4. Erol Akkuş ✗; 5. Ferhat Güzelgün ✗; 6. İbrahim Keleş ✗; 7. Erkan Seven ✗; 8. Hasan Biçiçi ✗	578	0.10	▲0.10
Nationalist Conservative	None elected: 1. Ali Akıl ✗; 2. Mehmet Bars ✗; 3. Şaban Küçükdağlı ✗; 4. Burhan Dağ ✗; 5. Abdullah Belibağlı ✗; 6. Mehmet Çelebi ✗; 7. Mustafa Kara ✗; 8. Vedat Dişbudak ✗	524	0.09	▲0.09
TKP	None elected: 1. Meliha Çiğdem Sarı ✗; 2. Sinem Bingöl ✗; 3. Hüseyin Özel ✗; 4. Samittin Arslan ✗; 5. Naciye Karaköçek ✗; 6. Emine Devrim Erdoğan ✗; 7. Pınar Bilici ✗; 8. Zübeyde Gülmez ✗	414	0.07	▼0.18
MP	None elected: 1. Sıddık Çakıroğlu ✗; 2. Mehmet Ali Kurtulan ✗; 3. Ahmet Yontucu ✗; 4. Muharrem Seyhan ✗; 5. Oktay Özdil ✗; 6. Ahmet Emrullah ✗; 7. Ülger İncearık ✗; 8. Belkıs Çetiner ✗	261	0.05	▲0.05
Liberal Democrat	No candidates	0	0.00	0.00
Total votes		563,434	100.00	
Rejected ballots		7,797	1.37	▲0.60
Turnout		569,385	86.72	▲4.22
AK Party hold Majority		318,835	56.77	▲1.16

=== June 2015 ===
Abbr.	Party	Votes	%
AKP	Justice and Development Party	352,949	61%
MHP	Nationalist Movement Party	115,291	19.9%
CHP	Republican People's Party	49,112	8.5%
HDP	Peoples' Democratic Party	29,749	5.1%
SP	Felicity Party	21,084	3.6%
	Other	10,007	1.7%
Total		578,192	
Turnout		84.79	
source: YSK

=== November 2015 ===
Abbr.	Party	Votes	%
AKP	Justice and Development Party	431,802	71.8%
MHP	Nationalist Movement Party	77,745	12.9%
CHP	Republican People's Party	57,309	9.5%
HDP	Peoples' Democratic Party	20,453	3.4%
SP	Felicity Party	3,840	0.6%
	Other	10,341	1.7%
Total		601,490	
Turnout		87.08	
source: YSK

=== 2018 ===
Abbr.	Party	Votes	%
AKP	Justice and Development Party	375,008	57.8%
MHP	Nationalist Movement Party	105,917	16.3%
IYI	Good Party	63,283	9.8%
CHP	Republican People's Party	61,433	9.5%
HDP	Peoples' Democratic Party	22,252	3.4%
SP	Felicity Party	9,848	1.5%
	Other	11,049	1.7%
Total		648,790	
Turnout		89.50	
source: YSK

== Presidential elections ==
=== 2014 ===
2014 presidential election: Kahramanmaraş
Party	Candidate	Votes	%
AK Party	Recep Tayyip Erdoğan	383,064	71.48
Independent	Ekmeleddin İhsanoğlu	129,801	24.22
HDP	Selahattin Demirtaş	23,009	4.29
Total votes		535,874	100.00
Rejected ballots		9,979	1.83
Turnout		545,853	79.54
Recep Tayyip Erdoğan win			
