= Bursa Uludağ University =

Public university located in Bursa, Turkey

Coordinates: 40.2189°N 28.8700°E

- Type: Public research university
- Established: 1975; 51 years ago
- Affiliations: EUA
- President: Prof. Dr. Ferudun YILMAZ
- Academic staff: 2305
- Students: 74,822
- Other students: 5,000 (International students from 124 countries)
- Location: Bursa, Turkey
- Campus: Suburban 3,954 acres (16.00 km^{2})
- Colors: Navy Turquoise
- Website: uludag.edu.tr

Bursa Uludağ University (Turkish: Bursa Uludağ Üniversitesi) is a public research university located in Bursa, Turkey. The university places a strong emphasis on research and education in the fields of international relations, medicine, engineering, natural and social sciences, and arts.

== Organisation ==
The university comprises 11 faculties, one undergraduate school, 12 vocational schools, one conservatoire, three institutes, 11 research centers, and six departments under the Presidency. During the 2017–2018 academic year, the university had an enrollment of 74,822 students.
