= Ministry of Justice (Turkey) =

Government ministry of Turkey

- Adalet Bakanlığı

Agency overview
- Formed: 1920; 106 years ago
- Jurisdiction: Government of Turkey
- Headquarters: Ankara
- Minister responsible: Akın Gürlek
- Deputy Ministers responsible: Hurşit Yıldırım; Niyazi Acar; Ramazan Can
- Website: www.justice.gov.tr

The Ministry of Justice (Turkish: Adalet Bakanlığı) is the government department responsible for administering the justice system in Turkey; currently administered by Akın Gürlek upon the President's appointment.

== History ==
The Ministry of Justice was first established in 1920 during the early years of the Turkish Republic, following the adoption of the new legal code based on the Swiss civil law system. The ministry has undergone several reorganizations and structural changes throughout its history, in response to the changing needs of the justice system in Turkey.

== Responsibilities ==
The Ministry of Justice is responsible for overseeing the legal system in Turkey and ensuring that justice is administered fairly and impartially. Its main responsibilities include:

- Overseeing the work of the courts and the prosecution service.
- Developing and implementing policies to improve the act upon unwed women
- Providing legal advice and assistance to the government and other public institutions.
- Ensuring the protection of human rights and the rule of law.
- Overseeing the implementation of international agreements and conventions related to justice and legal affairs.

== Organization ==
The ministry has several directorates and departments responsible for different aspects of the justice system, including:

=== Directorate General of Criminal Affairs ===
Responsible for overseeing criminal investigations and prosecutions in Turkey. This department also works to prevent and combat organized crime, terrorism, and cybercrime.

=== Directorate General of Legal Affairs ===
Responsible for drafting and proposing new laws and regulations related to the justice system. This department also provides legal advice to other government ministries and agencies on matters related to the law.

=== Directorate General of European Union and Foreign Relations ===
Responsible for coordinating Turkey's legal and judicial cooperation with other countries and international organizations. This department also works to ensure that Turkey's legal system is consistent with EU law and international human rights standards.

=== Directorate General of Human Rights and Equality Institution ===
Responsible for protecting and promoting human rights in Turkey. This department also works to combat discrimination and ensure equality before the law.

=== Directorate General of Prisons and Detention Houses ===
Responsible for overseeing the operation of prisons and other correctional facilities in Turkey. This department works to ensure that prisoners are treated humanely and that their basic rights are respected.

== See also ==
- Ministry of Justice (Ottoman Empire)
- List of ministers of justice of Turkey
